= St Leonards, Victoria =

St Leonards Victoria
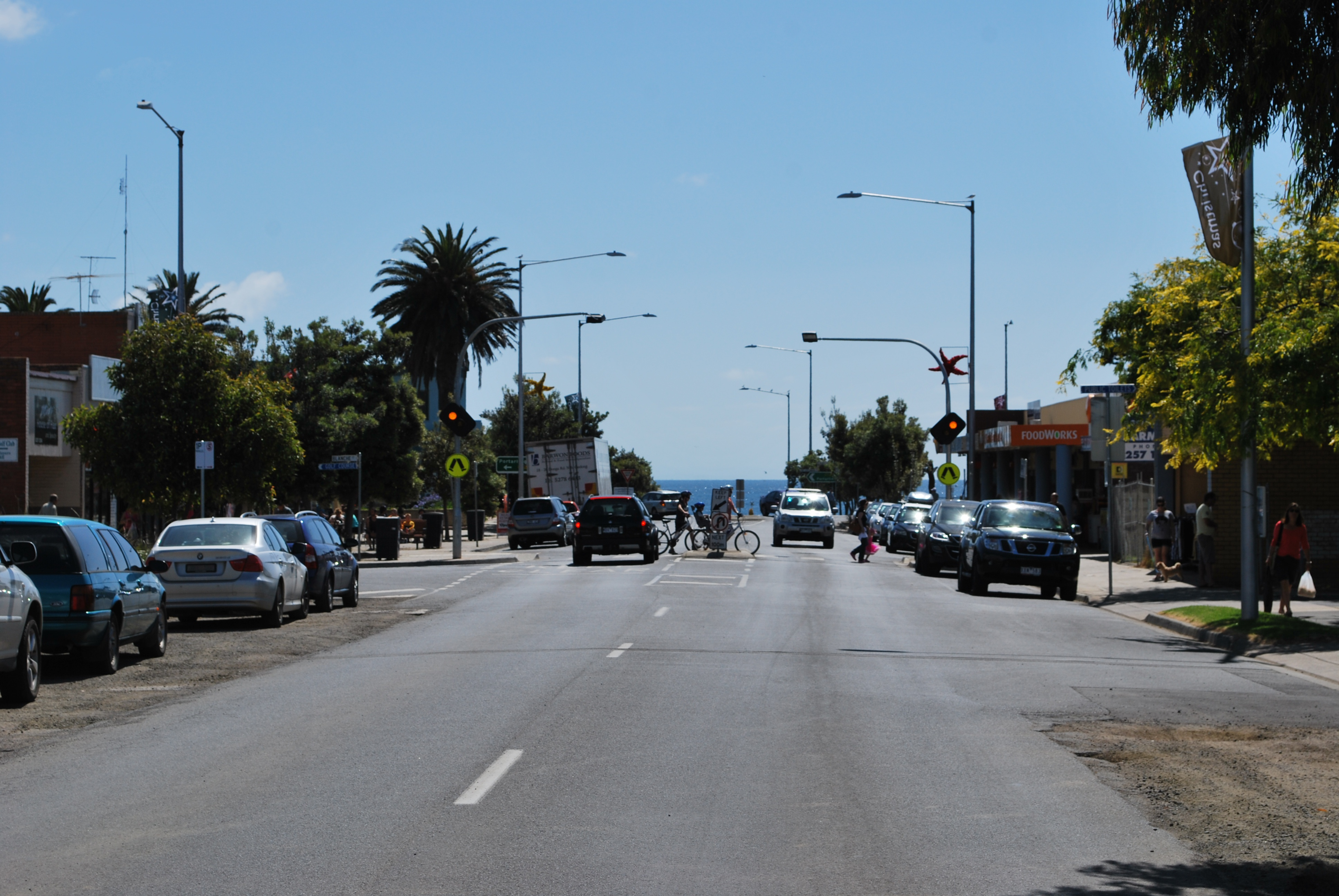
- Main street of St Leonards in 2010

- Coordinates: 38°10′S 144°43′E
- Population: 3,542 (2021 census)
- Established: 1855
- Postcode(s): 3223
- Location: 107 km (66 mi) SW of Melbourne; 33 km (21 mi) E of Geelong
- LGA(s): City of Greater Geelong
- State electorate(s): Bellarine
- Federal division(s): Corangamite
Localities around St Leonards:
Drysdale	Portarlington	Indented Head
Drysdale	St Leonards	Port Phillip
Mannerim	Swan Bay	Port Phillip

St Leonards is a coastal township on the Bellarine Peninsula, near Geelong, Victoria, Australia. It is situated 33 kilometres (21 mi) east of Geelong, at the eastern end of the Bellarine Peninsula, and north of Swan Bay.

St Leonards was a filming location for the Australian television series SeaChange. St Leonards is positioned centrally to many local wineries and eateries of the Bellarine Peninsula.

The town is surrounded by salt marsh wildlife reserves which provide habitat for hundreds of birds, including the critically endangered orange-bellied parrot of which there are less than 200 in the wild. Salt marshes are one of the most biologically productive habitats on the planet, rivalling tropical rainforests. In 2009, St. Leonards was nominated to have the cleanest beaches in Victoria.

St Leonards was given its name from St Leonards Station, a pastoral farm located in the region which was named after a town of the same name in Sussex, England.

== History ==
=== Early history ===
Before European settlement, the area around St Leonards was inhabited by the Bengalat balug clan of the Wathaurong tribe, part of the wider Kulin nation.

=== European Discovery and Early Settlement ===
In 1835, John Batman established a temporary encampment in St Leonards and first encountered the Bengalat balug clan of the Wathaurong tribe. This is where escaped convict William Buckley made contact with the Europeans for the first time after a period of 30 years, during which he had lived and interacted with the Wathaurong tribe.

=== Establishment ===
In the mid-1800s, Chinese immigrants became one of the earliest settlers in St Leonards, with many of them beginning as fishermen. Little is known of why they arrived, or why they left.

In 1855, St Leonards was established by George Ward Cole, to cater for the source of firewood for Melbourne. In the late 1850s, the pier was built by George Ward Cole to meet the demand for firewood in Melbourne. Cole began shipping timber from St Leonards to Melbourne for sale. By 1858, the town had a hotel, store, and fewer than 10 houses. The first hotel was established in 1858 and quickly became known as the town's social gathering place. The Post Office opened on 19 March 1860. In the early 1860s, pioneer settler William Bain McBeth attempted to establish a primary school. Around a decade later, St Leonards State School No. 866 opened in October 1874, on a half an acre block donated by George Ward Cole. By the late 1800s, Bay steamers would regularly deliver passengers for day trips or weekend stays.

=== Early to Mid Twentieth Century ===
In the early 1900s, Holden's Circus, founded by Adolphus Holden, would attract families to St Leonards over the summer months. They performed their acts through to the late 1930s.

In 1905, the original hotel was destroyed by fire, with the replacement structure in place until the 1950s. By 1910, the Coffee Palace was established by William and George Ward. In the same year, the original primary school building was replaced, which is today known as the current primary school library. In 1911, the Progress Association was formed.

The 1920s saw slight growth in the area, with the service of paddle steamers to nearby towns and the start of motorised transport. The area became a popular camping destination which remains to this day.

By late 1930s, the Coffee Palace became abandoned, and was eventually demolished. In the 1950s, the present hotel was built by Arthur Blanche.

=== Late 20th and Early 21st Centuries ===
St Leonards and the area gained exposure during the late 1990s, known as the Seachange phenomenon, due to the ABC TV series SeaChange being filmed in locations aross the Bellarine Peninsula, including St Leonards.

The 21st Century has seen rapid growth for St Leonards, from a population of 1,327 in the 2001 census to 3,542 in the 2021 census. Holiday makers and campers continue to bolster the seasonal population to over 10,000 during the summer period.

=== Heritage listed sites ===
St Leonards contains several Victorian Heritage Register listed sites, including:

- Coles Jetty
- St Leonards Primary School
- St Paul's Anglican Church

== Demographics ==
Population over time
1881	108
1947	96
1961	247
1971	469
1986	1,170
1991	1,206
2001	1,327
2011	2,001
2021	3,542

As of the 2021 census, 3,542 people resided in a total of 1,562 occupied dwellings. The median age of persons in St Leonards was 56, compared to the Victorian median of 38 years of age.

The population in 2021 has increased significantly compared to the 2011 census and 2016 census, where the population was 2,001 and 2,001 respectively.

During the summer period, St Leonards is a popular destination for holidaymakers, which can triple the population over the period.

== Places of Interest ==
St Leonards is home to good sailing waters, an Esplanade memorial recording the landfalls of Matthew Flinders in 1802 and John Batman in 1835, Edwards Point Wildlife Reserve, and bay and pier fishing.

It also maintains consistent calm waters as the town's location on the Bellarine Peninsula helps protect it from the bay's typical year round south west winds. Thus whilst large waves may be pounding on the east side of Port Phillip Bay due to strong south west winds, the water could be rather calm at St Leonards.

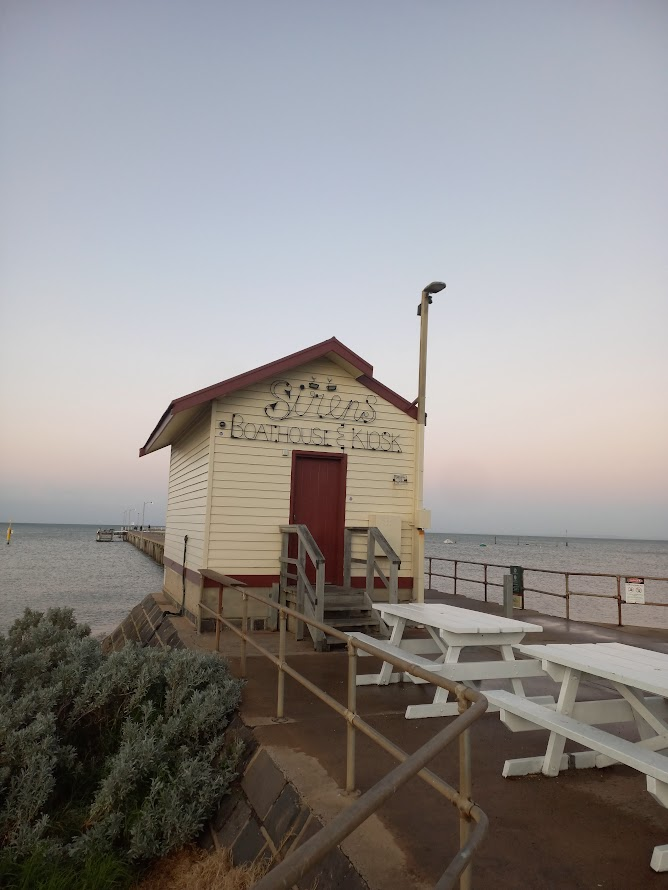
The old boathouse at St Leonards Pier

== Education ==
St Leonards has one primary school, known as St Leonards Primary School, which was established in 1874. The closest secondary schools are located in the nearby towns of Drysdale and Ocean Grove

== Parks ==
- Port Phillip Heads Marine National Park (Swan Bay section)
- Edwards Point Wildlife Reserve
- Duck Island
- Salt Lagoon State Nature Reserve
- St Leonards Lake Reserve

== Sport ==
St Leonards supports a range of sporting facilities and clubs, including:-

- Cricket - St Leonards Cricket Club
- Soccer - Bellarine Sharks AFC (2008 GRFA Division 3 League Champions)
- Tennis - St Leonards Tennis Club
- Lawn Bowls - St Leonards Bowling Club
- Golf - Golfers play at the course of the St Leonards Golf Club on Ibbotson Street (the golf club moved to new premises at Ibbotson Street in September 2011).
- Yachting - St Leonards Yacht Club

St Leonards formerly had an Australian Rules Football Team, the St. Leonards Football Club, nicknamed 'The Saints' between 1985-1994.

St Leonards also has Netball and Basketball Courts.
