= Swan Bay, Victoria =

Swan Bay
- Town
- Coordinates: 38°13′33″S 144°38′38″E
- Country: Australia
- State: Victoria
- LGA: City of Greater Geelong

Government
  - State electorate: Bellarine
  - Federal division: Corangamite

Population
  - Total: 59 (2016 census)
- Postcode: 3225
Localities around Swan Bay
Drysdale	St Leonards	St Leonards
Mannerim	Swan Bay	Port Phillip Bay
Point Lonsdale	Queenscliff	Swan Island

Swan Bay is a bounded rural coastal locality of the City of Greater Geelong between Queenscliff and St Leonards, Australia. It is bounded in the west by Portarlington-Queenscliff Road, in the north by Anderson Road, in the east by an offshore line across Swan Bay excluding Swan Island, and in the south by the coastline abutting Queenscliff.

Duck Island is included in the locality, within the Port Phillip Heads Marine National Park (Swan Bay section).

== See also ==
- Swan Bay, the geographic area
- Swan Bay and Port Phillip Bay Islands Important Bird Area
