= Swan Bay (disambiguation) =

Swan Bay may refer to:

- Swan Bay, New South Wales, a locality in New South Wales, Australia
- Swan Bay, Tasmania, a locality in Tasmania, Australia
- Swan Bay, Victoria, a locality in Victoria, Australia
- Swan Bay, a marine embayment in Victoria, Australia
