= Swan Bay and Port Phillip Bay Islands Important Bird Area =

Coordinates: 38°14′15″S 144°40′02″E

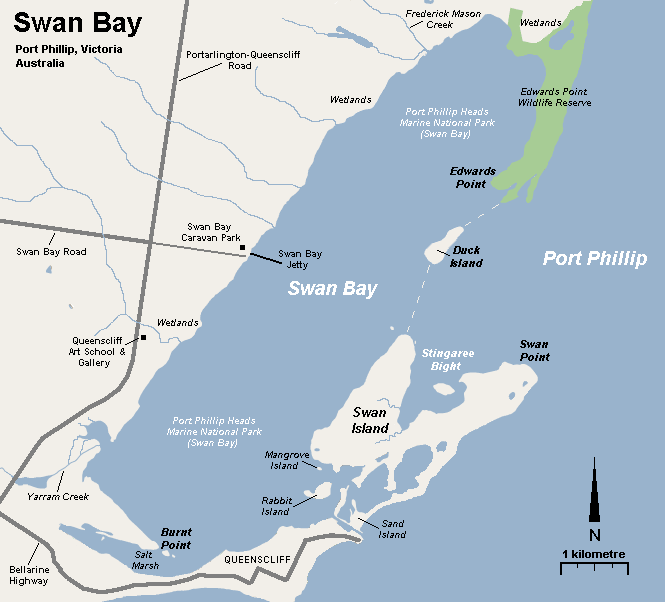
Map of Swan Bay showing the position of Edwards Point with Duck, Swan and Rabbit Islands

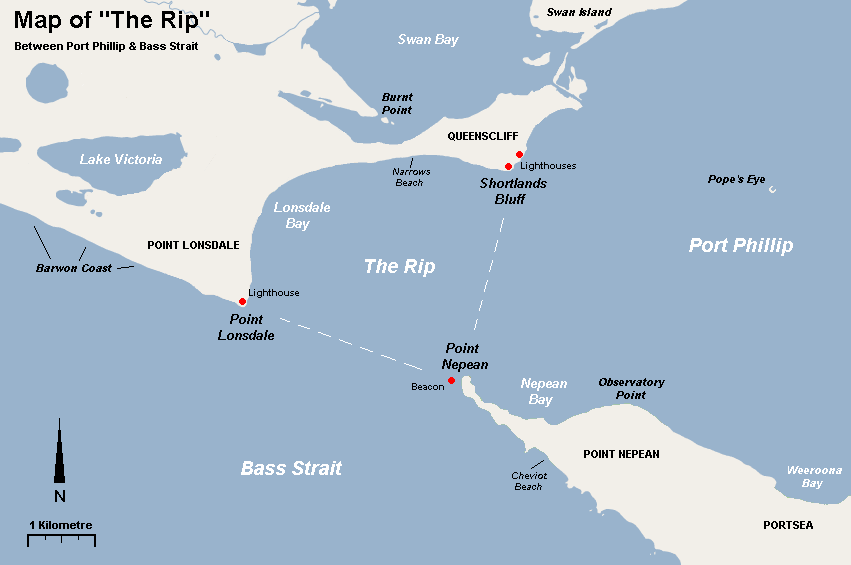
Map of the southern end of Swan Bay and the entrance to Port Phillip from Bass Strait (The Rip), showing the positions of Lake Victoria and Pope's Eye

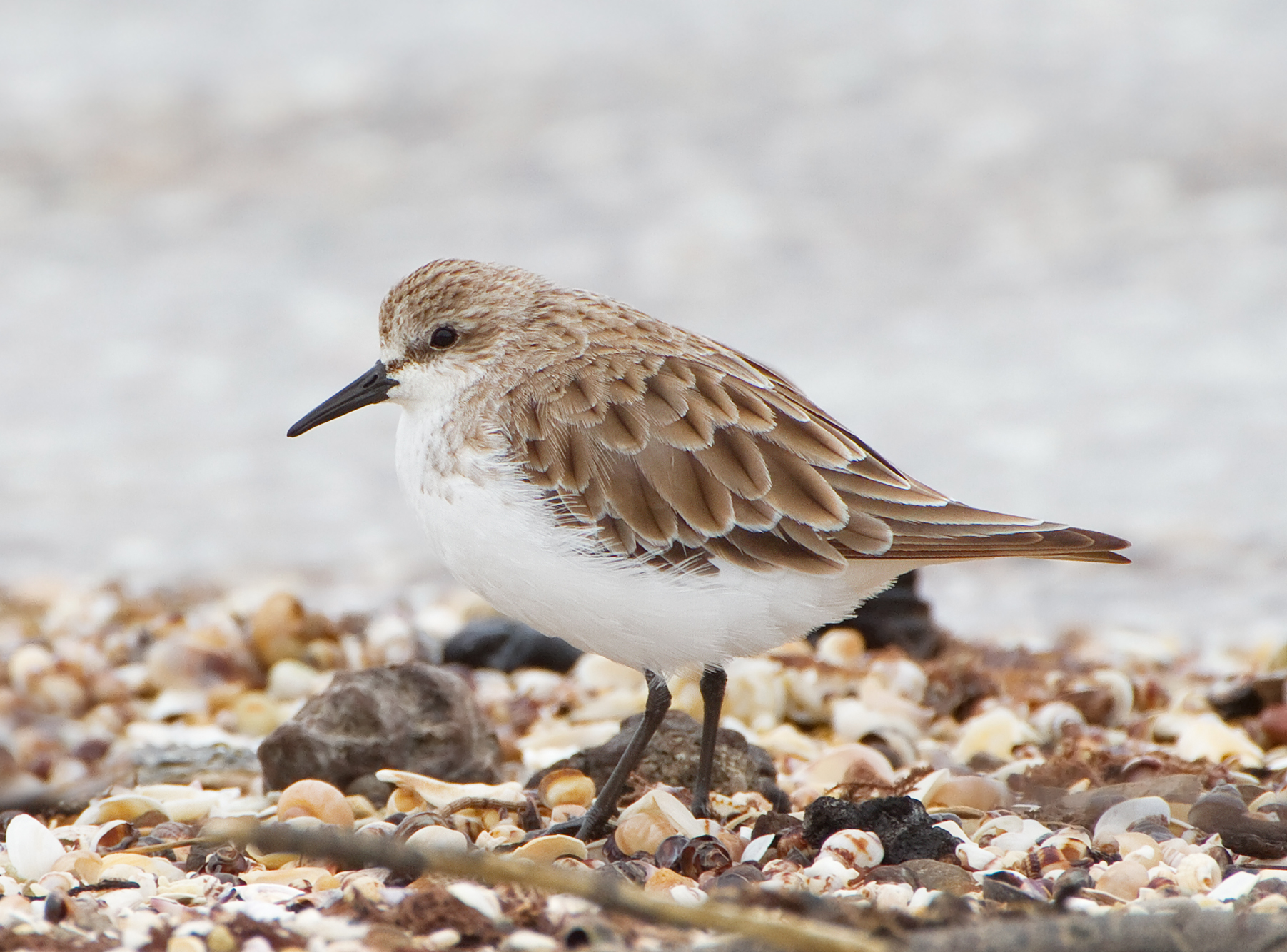
The area is important for red-necked stints...

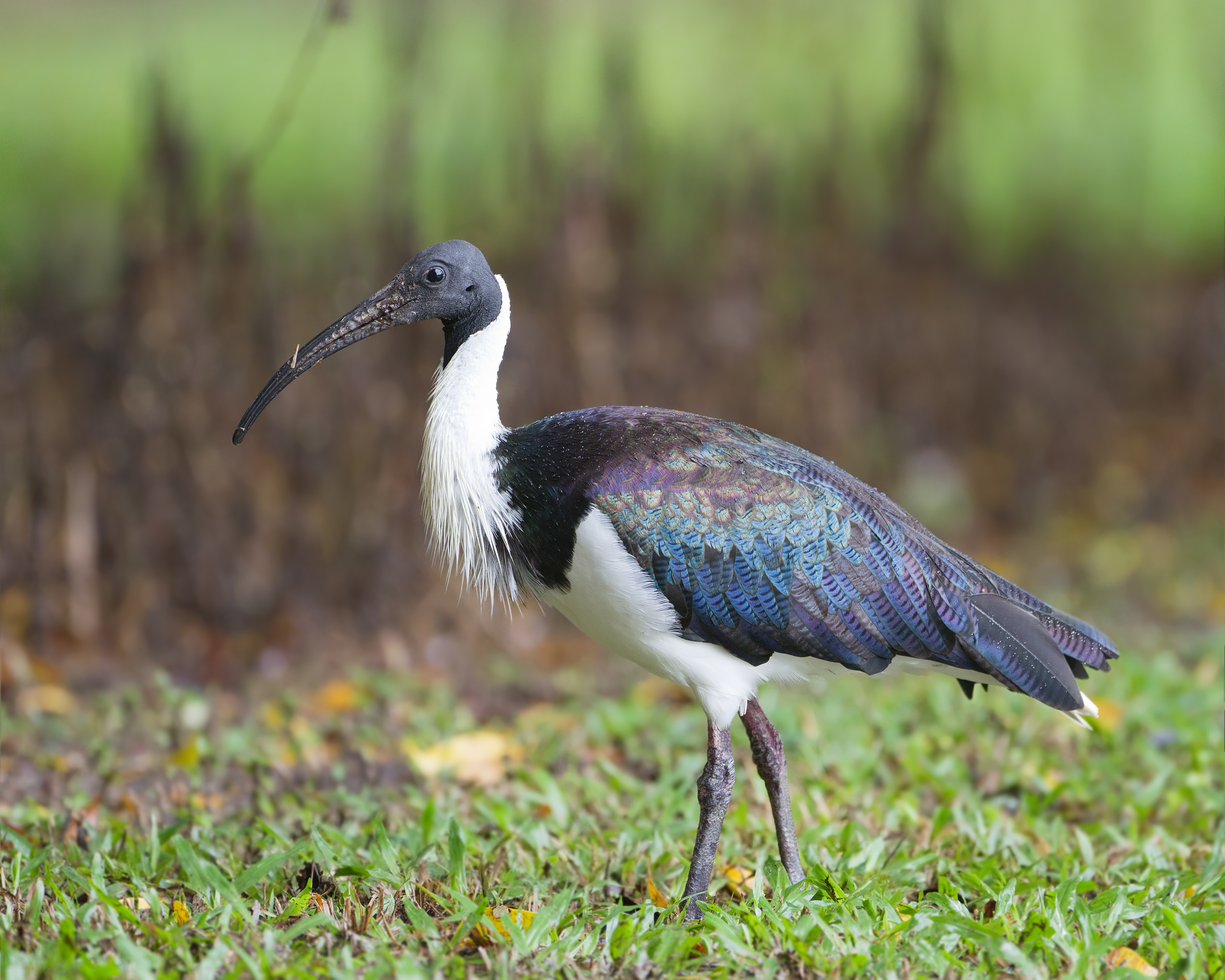
...and for straw-necked ibises.

The Swan Bay and Port Phillip Bay Islands Important Bird Area comprises a cluster of disparate sites centred at the eastern end of the Bellarine Peninsula, and the southern end of Port Phillip, in Victoria, south-eastern Australia. As well as providing core wintering habitat for orange-bellied parrots, it is important for waders, or shorebirds, and seabirds.

== Description ==
Sites included in the Important Bird Area (IBA) are:

Swan Bay area wetlands and barrier islands

- Portarlington sewage treatment works
- Swan Bay - 30 km^{2} marine embayment with intertidal flats fringed by saltmarsh
- Edwards Point - 4 km sandspit with coastal woodland, heathland and saltmarsh
- Duck Island - small sand and saltmarsh island
- Swan Island - 140 ha sand island, with coastal scrub and saltmarsh
- Rabbit Island - small saltmarsh island
- Freshwater Lake - small ephemeral lake, fringed by herbland
- Lake Victoria - 139 ha shallow saline lake with extensive mudflats bordered by saltmarsh and sedgeland

Port Phillip islands and structures

- Mud Islands - tight group of three low, sandy islands, with a total area of 50 ha, with shrubland, saltmarsh and mudflats
- Pope's Eye - small artificial island with timber platform and navigation beacon
- South Channel Island - small artificial island
- Wedge Light - timber platform with adjacent navigation beacon

Swan Bay and Mud Islands are within the Port Phillip Bay (Western Shoreline) and Bellarine Peninsula Ramsar Site. Swan Bay, Mud Islands and Pope's Eye are in the Port Phillip Heads Marine National Park.

== Birds ==
The group of sites has been identified as an IBA by BirdLife International because it supports significant numbers of critically endangered orange-bellied parrots and vulnerable fairy terns, and over 1% of the world populations of blue-billed ducks, chestnut teals, Australian white and straw-necked ibises, red-necked stints and silver gulls.

The IBA regularly supports over 20,000 waterbirds, including 4000 to 15,000 waders and over 10,000 nesting seabirds. The largest Victorian colonies of white-faced storm petrels comprise some 12,400 nesting burrows on Mud Islands and South Channel Island. Mud Islands also has important breeding colonies of Australian pelicans, silver gulls, greater crested and Caspian terns, and ibises. Australasian gannets nest on artificial structures such as Pope's Eye and Wedge Light. The waders move regularly between the various sites to feed and roost but rarely move to the other areas of Port Phillip, which are identified as separate IBAs.

== Other animals ==
The marine waters adjacent to the IBA contain populations of Australian fur seals and Burrunan dolphins. Australian sea lions are also present in the area. Coastal whales such as southern right and southern humpback entering the Port Phillip Bay may appear off the reserve as well.
