= St Leonards Salt Lagoon =

Lake in Australia

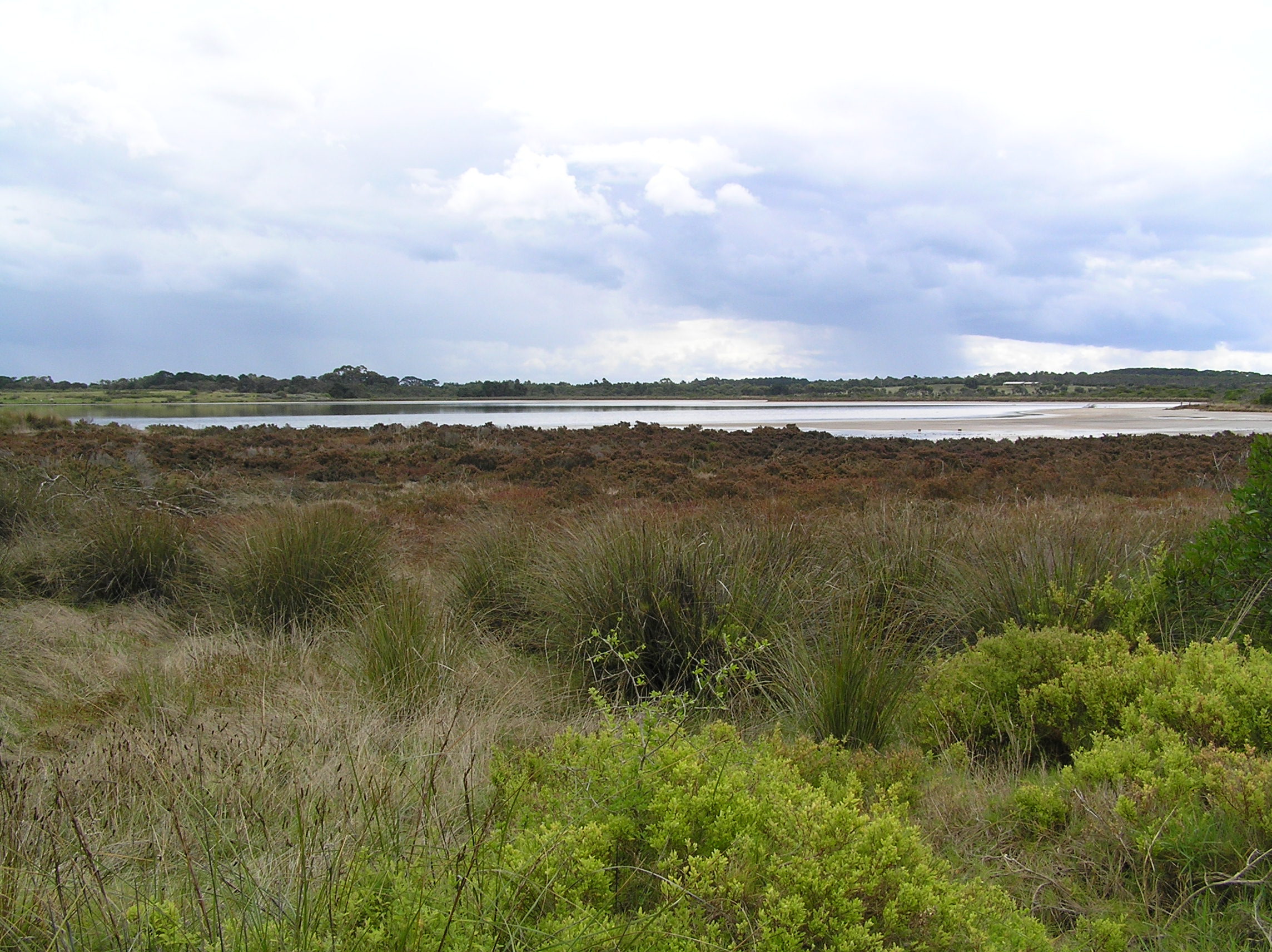
- View from south-east

- Location in Victoria
- Location: Bellarine Peninsula, Victoria
- Coordinates: 38°09′32″S 144°42′40″E
- Type: Hypersaline, ephemeral
- Catchment area: Local
- Basin countries: Australia
- Surface area: 50 hectares (120 acres)
- Surface elevation: 0 m (0 ft) AHD

St Leonards Salt Lagoon is a former marine embayment, isolated by coastal deposition from Port Phillip Bay, at St Leonards, Victoria, Australia. It now forms a shallow and hypersaline lake, of about 50 hectares (120 acres), which is often dry. It is a Victorian Nature Reserve.
