= Lake Victoria (Victoria) =

Lake in Victoria, Australia

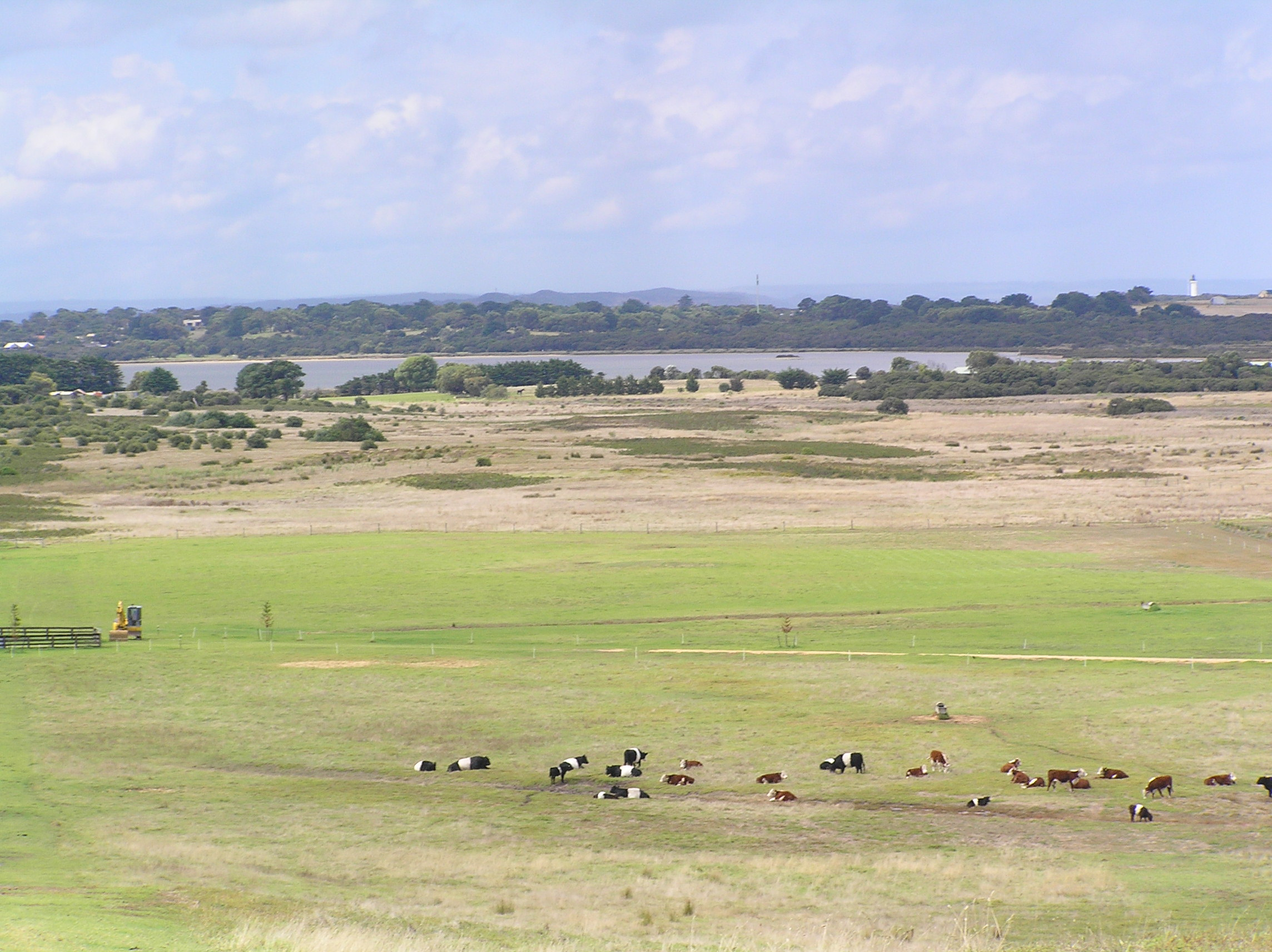
- View of lake from the west

- Location in Victoria
- Location: Bellarine Peninsula, Victoria
- Coordinates: 38°16′22″S 144°35′21″E
- Type: Saline
- Basin countries: Australia
- Surface area: 139 ha (340 acres)

Lake Victoria is a 139-hectare (340-acre) shallow saline lake on the Bellarine Peninsula, Victoria in Australia, close to the township of Point Lonsdale and part of the Lonsdale Lakes Nature Reserve administered by Parks Victoria.

== Location and features ==
The lake is separated from Bass Strait by a narrow strip of coastal dunes. It forms part of the Swan Bay wetland system of shallow marine areas and lagoons, and is an important wetland for waterbirds and waders.

The site is part of the Swan Bay and Port Phillip Bay Islands Important Bird Area, identified as such by BirdLife International. Birds of conservation significance for which the lake and its surrounds are important include the hooded plover, little egret and orange-bellied parrot. It sometimes holds internationally significant numbers of red-necked stints and banded stilts.

Plant communities consist of salt tolerant species typical of coastal dune woodland and saltmarsh in the region. Woodland and tall shrubland along the southern lakeshore mainly consist of Moonah Melaleuca lanceolata, a species that is listed as threatened in Victoria under the Flora and Fauna Guarantee Act.
