= Edwards Point (Victoria) =

Headland in Victoria, Australia

Coordinates: 38°13′S 144°41′E

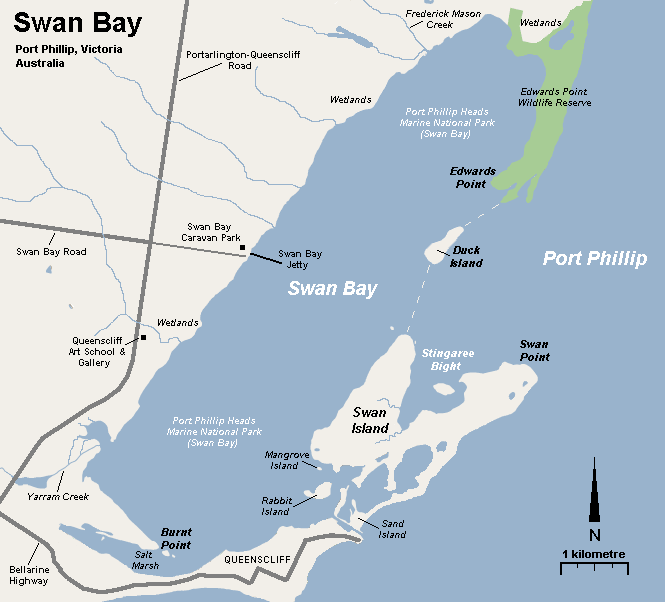
Map of Swan Bay with Edwards Point at the top right corner

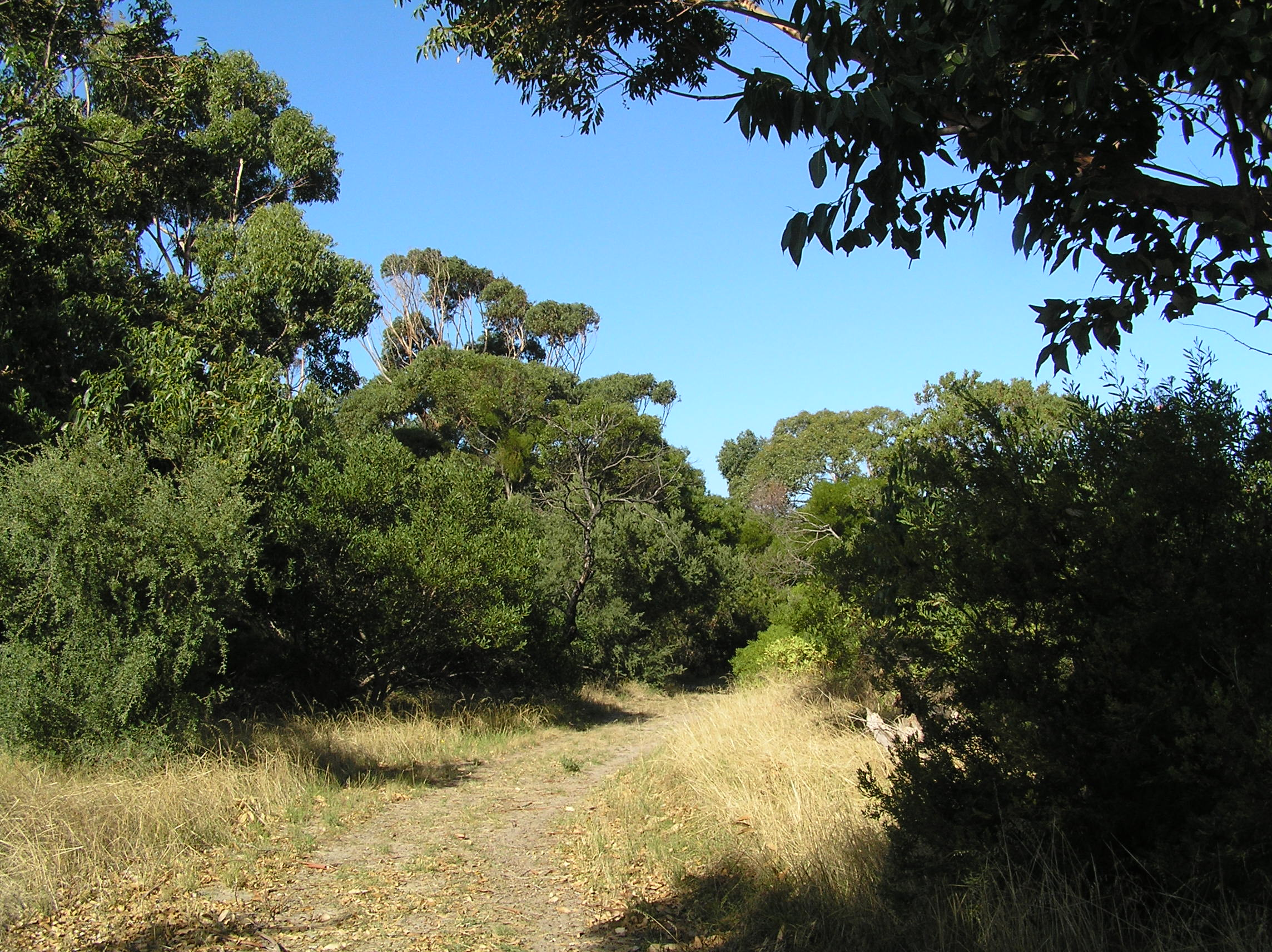
Woodland walking track in the reserve

Edwards Point is a 4 km long sand spit extending southwards between Swan Bay and Port Phillip Bay, at the eastern end of the Bellarine Peninsula, Victoria, Australia. It is about 115 km by road south-west of Melbourne and 40 km east of Geelong.

The township of St Leonards lies at its northern end. With Duck Island and Swan Island it forms the part-barrier that separates Swan Bay from Port Phillip.

== Edwards Point Wildlife Reserve ==
The spit is entirely included within the Edwards Point Wildlife Reserve, established in March 1971 to protect the vegetation communities and fauna of the area. These communities include the last remaining stand of coastal woodland on the Bellarine Peninsula, saltmarsh and beach. The adjacent Swan Bay contains extensive areas of intertidal mudflats that are important for waterbirds and migratory waders. The end of the spit is a high tide roost for waders.

The spit is part of the Swan Bay and Port Phillip Bay Islands Important Bird Area, identified as such by BirdLife International. Birds of conservation significance for which the area is known include the critically endangered orange-bellied parrot as well as the little tern, fairy tern, eastern curlew, Lewin's rail and white-bellied sea-eagle. It has also supported over 1% of the Australian population of four wader species: grey plover, Pacific golden plover, double-banded plover and eastern curlew.
