= Mud Islands =

Island in Port Phillip Bay, Victoria, Australia

- Location within Melbourne

Geography
- Location: Port Phillip
- Coordinates: 38°16′S 144°46′E

Administration
- Australia
- State: Victoria

The Mud Islands reserve is located within Port Phillip, about 90 km (56 mi) south-west of Melbourne, Australia, lying 10 km (6.2 mi) inside Port Phillip Heads, 7 km (4.3 mi) north of Portsea and 9 km (5.6 mi) east of Queenscliff. The land area of about 50 hectares (120 acres) is made up of three low-lying islands surrounding a shallow tidal 35-hectare (86-acre) lagoon connected to the sea by three narrow channels. The shapes and configuration of the islands change over the years due to movement of sand by tidal currents.

== History ==
Acting Lieutenant John Murray discovered the islands in February 1802 while surveying the Port Phillip shoreline. Murray's party observed numerous swans and pelicans on the islands, which prompted him to name the group "Swan Isles". At first sight, large guano deposits made the islands appear to be rocky outcrops, and Murray's inaccurate sketch of the islands demonstrates that they were not surveyed by his party. Over the next 140 years, the islands were periodically visited by individuals such as fishermen and guano-diggers, and Lieutenants T.M. Symonds and H.R. Henry of HMS Rattlesnake surveyed the islands in 1836 and renamed them Mud Islands. However, the first careful scientific study of the islands was not made until 1945.

=== Protection ===
In 1961, the Victorian Fisheries and Wildlife Department declared the islands a sanctuary for the white-faced storm petrel. In 1979, the area of the islands above high water was proclaimed a permanent reserve for the management of wildlife. It forms part of the Port Phillip Bay (Western Shoreline) and Bellarine Peninsula Ramsar Site, which was designated in, as a wetland of international importance, and it is also included on the Register of the National Estate. Since 2002 it has been, with the adjacent waters, part of the Port Phillip Heads Marine National Park.

== Environment ==
=== Flora ===
Within the reserve there are nine native vegetation communities. Seagrass meadows, sand dunes, mudflats and salt marshes support a diversity of life ranging from marine invertebrates to fish and birds. Wind and tide are gradually changing the shape of the islands, although they are partly stabilised by a salt marsh of austral sea-blite and beaded and shrubby glasswort. The dense coastal scrub on the northern island has disappeared, apparently as a result of overgrazing by rabbits. Today only a single specimen of coastal teatree (Leptospermum laevigatum) remains.

=== Fauna ===
The site is part of the Swan Bay and Port Phillip Bay Islands Important Bird Area, identified as such by BirdLife International. Some 70 species of birds have been recorded on the Islands, which form essential breeding, feeding and roosting areas for seabirds and waders, many of them migratory.

==== Seabirds ====
The isolation of the islands provides protection from predators and makes them an ideal sanctuary for breeding seabirds, notably the five and a half thousand white-faced storm-petrels which, during summer, lay their eggs in burrows in the loose sand of Middle Island. During the day they feed at sea on shrimps and small fish, returning at night to feed their chicks. Although there are fewer than at nearby South Channel Fort, nearly a quarter of the white-faced storm-petrels in Victoria breed on Mud Islands.

Silver gulls are even more numerous. During the second half of the 20th century the breeding population increased to about 100,000. Given a chance, gulls readily attack the eggs and young of other breeding seabirds. The impact is under study.

Other seabirds nesting on Mud Islands include nearly a thousand crested terns, one of the largest colonies in Victoria and the only one in Port Phillip. Also important to the islands are the dozen breeding pairs of Caspian terns and, in 1983 and 1986, several pairs of Australian pelicans. Little penguins and fairy terns have bred there in the past. The common tern also roosts in exceptionally large numbers and as many as 260 have been seen there at once.

==== Waders ====
The mud from which the islands get their name is excellent feeding habitat for migratory waders. More than 1% of the known Australian populations of four wader species, Pacific golden plover, grey plover, lesser sand plover and ruddy turnstone, spend the summer around Mud Islands. More than 5% of the Victorian populations of red knot, great knot, eastern curlew and bar-tailed godwit feed in Swan Bay to the west but roost on the islands at high tide. Two resident waders, the pied oystercatcher and the red-capped plover, regularly breed on undisturbed parts of the islands.

==== Other ====
Few land birds are permanently resident, although many species visit and may breed. Large numbers of straw-necked ibis and, to a lesser extent, Australian white ibis, nest and roost on the islands and fly daily to the mainland for feeding. Lewin's rail occasionally breeds in the salt marsh but is so shy that nesting is seldom recorded. Up to 100 rare orange-bellied parrots have been seen on the islands during winter when they migrate to the Australian mainland from Tasmania. Since the mid-20th century, however, numbers have declined, possibly because the increasing number of gulls has changed the chemistry of the soil and so the vegetation on which the parrots feed. Nevertheless, the islands are an important habitat for this endangered species. Bronze whaler sharks are known to breed around the islands.

== Access ==
The islands can only be reached by boat, the most convenient departure points being Queenscliff or Sorrento. Day visitors are permitted, but overnight camping is not. BirdLife Australia conduct regular tours to Mud Islands, usually in February and March. South Bay Eco Adventures also run guided walking tours of the islands. As the islands are surrounded by shallow waters, visitors need to be cautious when attempting a landing. Passengers must be ferried to shore by dinghy or else wade in. Visits need careful planning to avoid the boat being stranded at low tide.
