= Pope's Eye =

Uncompleted foundation for an island fort at Port Philip, Victoria, Australia

- Man–made bluestone boulders
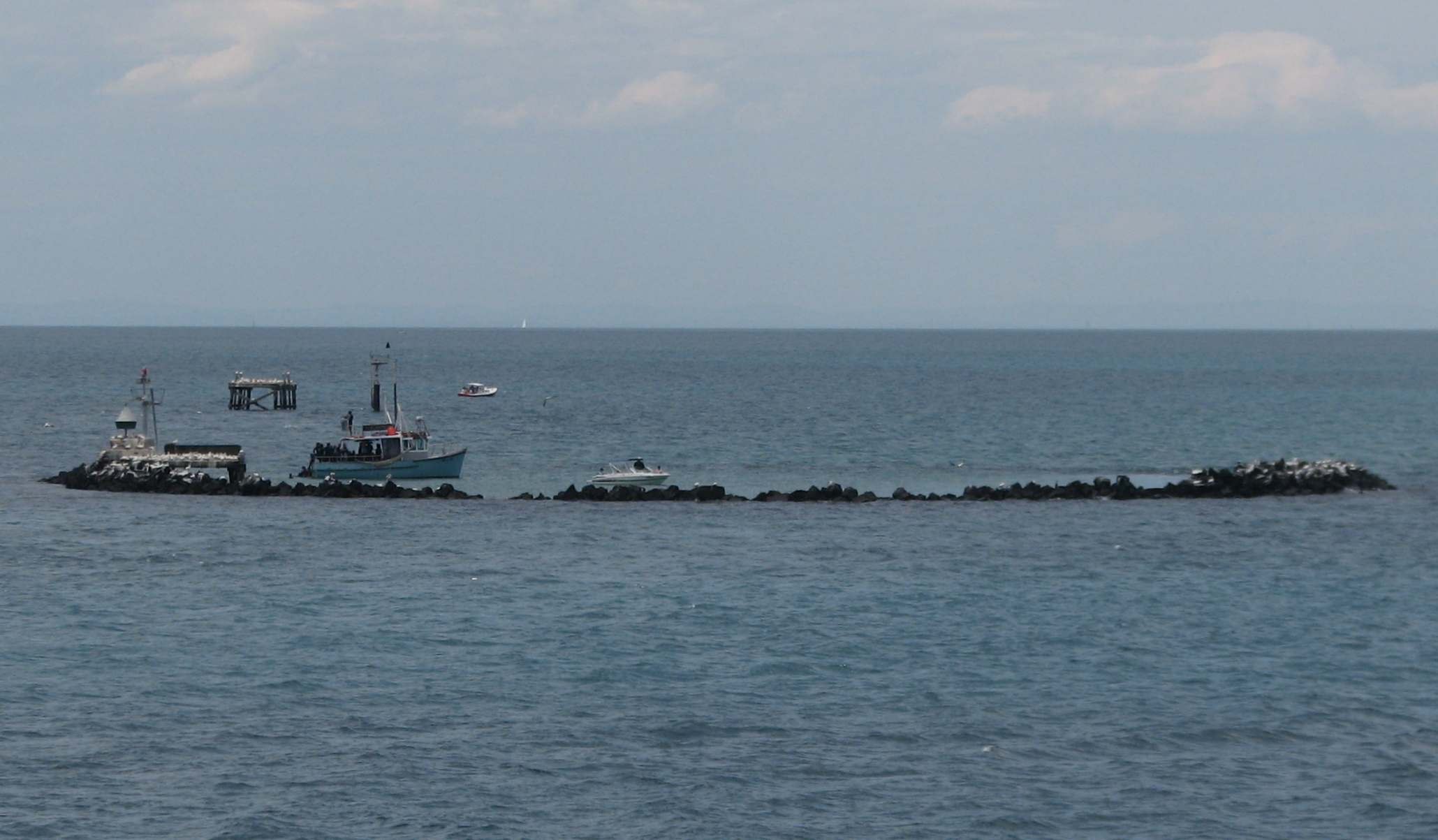

- Pope's Eye, located in Port Phillip, Victoria, Australia
- Coordinates: 38.277°S 144.699°E
- Location: Port Phillip, Victoria
- Operator: Parks Victoria

Area
  - Total: 4 hectares (9.9 acres)
- Elevation: descends 1.5–10 m (4 ft 11 in – 32 ft 10 in)
- Designation: Port Phillip Heads Marine National Park
- Website: Pope's Eye

Pope's Eye is the uncompleted foundation for an island fort intended to defend the entrance to Port Phillip in the state of Victoria, Australia. The undefined area of the fort, generally assessed at 4 hectares (9.9 acres), is one of six separate areas that comprise the Port Phillip Heads Marine National Park and is a popular site for divers.

== Features ==
The fort has been protected as a marine reserve since 1979 and is now part of the Port Phillip Heads Marine National Park. It is located about 7 kilometres (4.3 mi) inside Port Phillip Heads, 3 kilometres (1.9 mi) east of Queenscliff, 5 kilometres (3.1 mi) north of Portsea, and is less than 1 kilometre (0.62 mi) south-west of the former Chinaman's Hat. It is named after a naval midshipman and has no religious connotations.

Construction of Pope's Eye began in the 1880s, under the supervision of Sir William Jervois, by dumping bluestone boulders on a submerged 12-metre (39 ft) deep sandbank until they formed a horse-shoe shaped artificial reef, open to the north-east, just above high-water level. Construction ceased before completion as a fort because improvements in naval gunnery enabled the entrance to Port Phillip (The Rip) and the associated shipping channel to be protected by guns at the nearby Swan Island fort, as well as at Fort Queenscliff and Fort Nepean, making Pope's Eye redundant for military purposes. The reef now hosts a navigation beacon.

The inside of the 'eye' is only about 2 metres (6 ft 7 in) deep and is accessible to small boats as a sheltered anchorage. It is protected from strong currents and the whole structure is popular with snorkellers and scuba-divers.

=== Flora and fauna ===
The reef provides a rich habitat based on the underwater forest of marine algae, such as giant and leathery kelp, that sustains a rich fauna of fish and marine invertebrates, including sponges and soft corals. The site is part of the Swan Bay and Port Phillip Bay Islands Important Bird Area, identified as such by BirdLife International. Pope's Eye is an important breeding site for Australasian gannets, which nest on platforms constructed for them as well as on the rocks of the reef, which are also used for roosting by black-faced cormorants and for foraging by ruddy turnstones. The site is often visited by Australian fur seals and Burrunan (bottlenose) dolphins.

== See also ==
- Protected areas of Victoria
