= Portsea Hole =

Seafloor depression in Port Phillip, Victoria, Australia

- Blue hole
- Portsea Hole, located in Port Phillip, Victoria, Australia
- Coordinates: 38.3109°S 144.7111°E
- Location: Port Phillip, Victoria
- Operator: Parks Victoria

Area
  - Total: 10 hectares (25 acres)

Dimensions
  - Length: 400 metres (1,300 ft)
  - Width: 250 metres (820 ft)
- Elevation: descends 20–32 m (66–105 ft)
- Designation: Port Phillip Heads Marine National Park
- Website: Portsea Hole

The Portsea Hole is a depression in the seafloor of Port Phillip near Portsea in Victoria, Australia. The undefined area of the depression, generally assessed at 10 hectares (25 acres), is one of six separate areas that comprise the Port Phillip Heads Marine National Park and is a popular site for divers.

== Features ==
The Portsea Hole is a remnant section of the drowned valley of the Yarra River, descending sharply from the 12 metres (39 ft) depth of the surrounding seabed to 32 metres (105 ft), exposing changes in the strata of the limestone sides with depth. It is characterized by diverse and abundant fish assemblages as well as a rich benthic community of marine invertebrates, encrusting algae, sponges and soft corals.

The Portsea Hole in Port Phillip is about 500 metres (1,600 ft) from the Portsea Pier. To the north there is a vertical wall approximately 75 metres (246 ft) long. The wall has small overhangs which are home to plenty of marine life, including Blue Devil fish. The Portsea Hole is a popular boat dive site for recreational scuba diving activities.

== See also ==
- Protected areas of Victoria
