= Duck Island (Victoria) =

Island in Victoria, Australia

Coordinates: 38°13′S 144°41′E

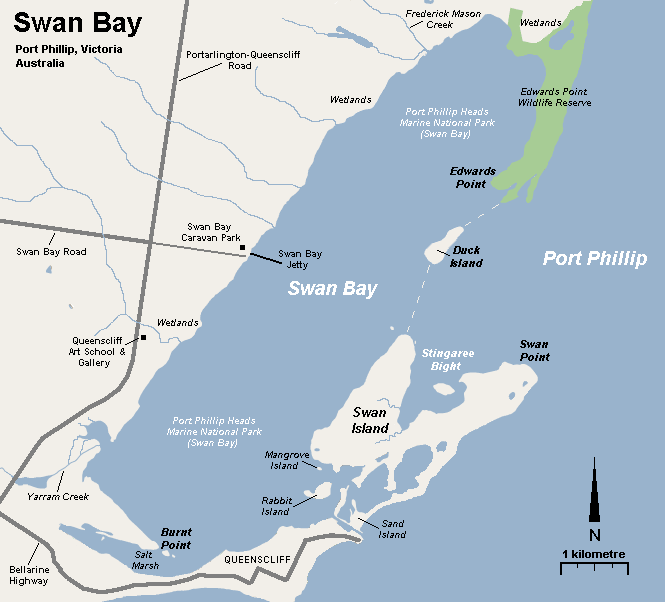
Map of Swan Bay with Duck Island located between Edwards Point and Swan Island

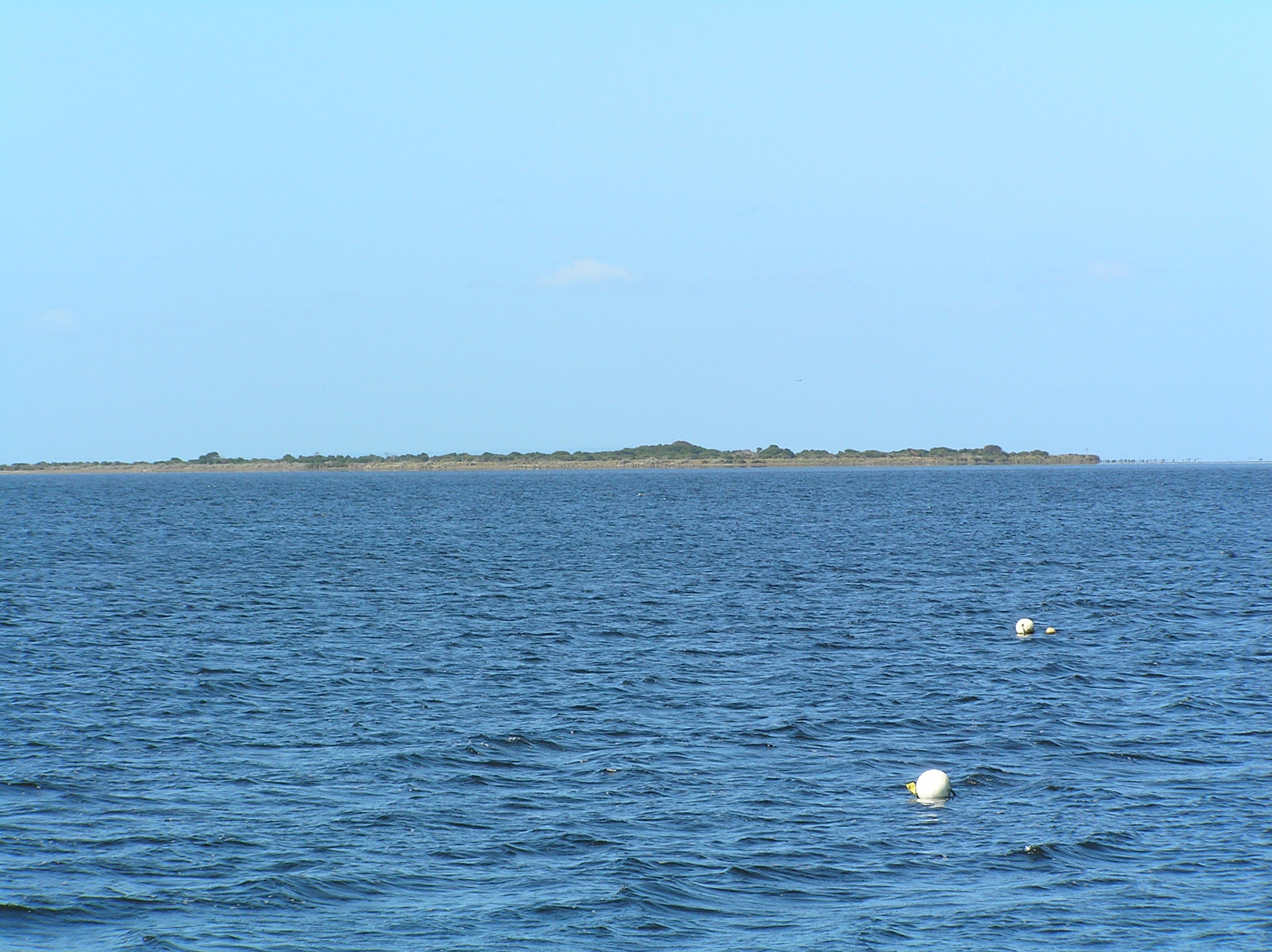
View of Duck Island from Swan Bay Jetty

Duck Island, a small barrier island, lies 1.5 km north of Swan Island and south of Edwards Point in the main entrance to Swan Bay from Port Phillip in southern Victoria, Australia. It is part of the Port Phillip Heads Marine National Park and the plants and animals on and around the island are protected, including the critically endangered orange-bellied parrot. The island is part of the Swan Bay and Port Phillip Bay Islands Important Bird Area, identified as such by BirdLife International.

== See also ==
- Swan Bay
