= Earl of Charlemont (ship) =

1849 passenger ship

Coordinates: 38°18′33.43″S 144°29′28.59″E

History

United Kingdom
- Name: Earl of Charlemont
- Namesake: James Caulfeild, 1st Earl of Charlemont
- Owner: Magee & Co.
- Port of registry: Liverpool
- Launched: 1849
- Fate: Wrecked, 18 June 1853

General characteristics
- Tonnage: 883 GRT
- Tons burthen: 878 tons bm
- Length: 147 ft 8 in (45.01 m)
- Beam: 30 ft 6 in (9.30 m)
- Depth: 22 ft 2 in (6.76 m)
- Sail plan: Full-rigged ship
- Capacity: Passengers & general cargo
- Crew: 15

The Earl of Charlemont was a medium-sized, 878-ton passenger ship, which was shipwrecked on a voyage to Australia.

== Ship history ==
The ship was built at Saint John, New Brunswick, Canada, in 1849.

It sailed from the Port of Liverpool on 13 March 1853 with 366 passengers plus crew, captained by William Gardner. The first port of call was to be Port Phillip, Victoria, before continuing to Sydney with the majority of the passengers.

After a passage of 97 days, the ship reached Cape Otway on 17 June, and set a course for Port Phillip some 56 miles (90 km) away. At 5.15 a.m. the next morning the ship struck a reef (later named Charlemont Reef) about 1 1/2 miles (2.4 km) from Point Flinders (now Barwon Heads). An attempt to launch the ship's boats failed in the heavy surf, so the main mast was cut down to lighten the ship, which then washed over the reef and grounded nearer shore. A passenger named Savage swam ashore with a light rope, and a hawser was stretched between the ship and the shore. Using a ship's boat, the passengers and crew were all safely ferried ashore by 8.30 p.m., apart from one elderly passenger named Thwaites, who died from a heart attack, and was buried on the headland.

The passengers were provided with shelter by a local settler, Mr. McVean, who alerted the authorities at Geelong. James Cowie, the mayor of Geelong, sent food and eight bullock drays to transport the women, children and infirm to Geelong, while the able-bodied followed on foot. The people of Geelong raised £1,000 to assist the passengers who had lost all their possessions.

A subsequent inquiry laid blame for the disaster on Captain Gardner, but a sailing directory published by the Admiralty in 1855 noted that the wreck of the Earl of Charlemont, and that of Sacramento two months earlier, were due to strong currents carrying the vessels inshore when hove to awaiting daylight.

In 1953, on the centenary of the wreck, a memorial service was held, attended by descendants of the survivors and, in November 1953, a cairn was erected overlooking the scene of the wreck.
