= Seachange (demography) =

Human migration from cities in favour of rural coastal communities

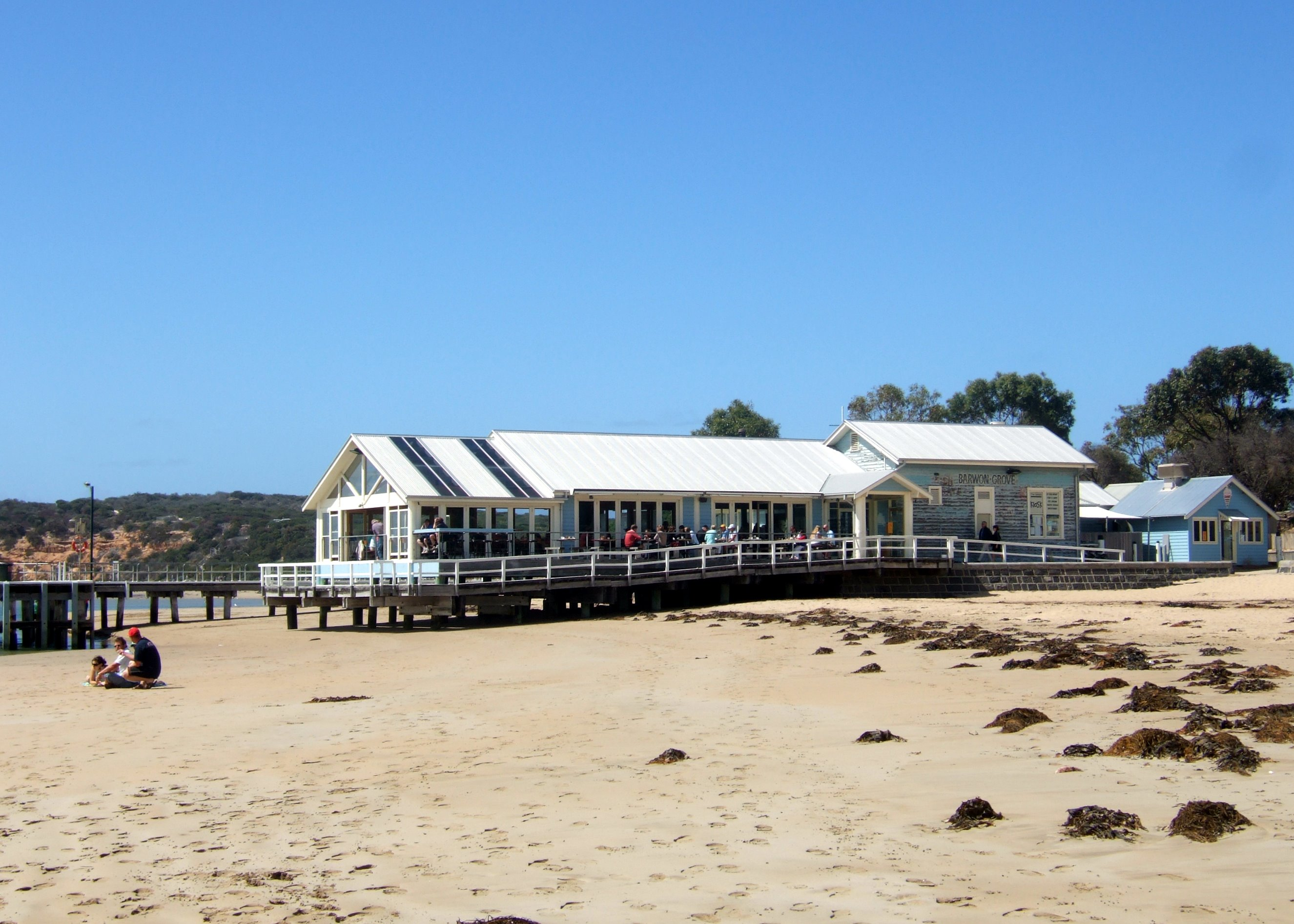
The boatshed in Barwon Heads used as a set in SeaChange was redeveloped into a restaurant.

In Australian culture, a seachange (or sea change) is a form of human migration where individuals abandon city living for a perceived easier life in rural coastal communities. This meaning originated in, or was popularised by, the ABC TV series SeaChange, about city-dwellers who have relocated to the coast. The series has been implicated in a rapid boom in tourism and real estate development in coastal areas, particularly in New South Wales.

A similar term, treechange, describes the movement of urban people to the countryside. The term "tree change" was coined by ABC Ballarat radio mornings presenter Steve Martin on his radio talk back show after his five question morning challenge.

== Etymology ==
The term sea change comes from Shakespeare's The Tempest, referring to a radical change in appearance or other physical characteristics brought about by long immersion in the ocean.

== SeaChange TV series ==
In the television series SeaChange, which originally ran 1998 to 2000, the main character Laura Gibson fulfils her escapist desire by leaving the city for a small seaside town after her career and family life in Melbourne falls apart. The series was one of the most popular programmes in Australia. The primary filming location was Barwon Heads on the Bellarine Peninsula.

== Who is shifting ==
People shifting to the coast have been characterised as:

- Free agent migrators
  - Include retirees
  - Majority are of working age, drawn to service the needs of retirees and tourists
  - Sub categories include pre-retirees, alternative lifestylers and internet business operators
- Forced relocating migrants
  - Principally people reliant on income support including unemployed, single parents and the disabled

== Effect ==
The rate of growth in rural coastal areas in 2008 was 60% higher than the national average. Almost six million people already resided in coastal areas outside the mainland capitals in 2008. In addition to people seeking a better lifestyle, the seachange phenomenon is driven by retiring baby boomers and people forced out of capital cities by high house prices.

In response to the influx of tourists and new residents to their jurisdictions, coastal councils from around Australia formed the National Sea Change Taskforce in 2004 to seek ways to ensure sustainable development in their communities. As at 2008 there are 68 member councils from around Australia collectively representing more than four million residents.

== See also ==
- Counterurbanization
