= Bellarine Peninsula =

Peninsula in Victoria, Australia

Coordinates: 38.212°S 144.527°E

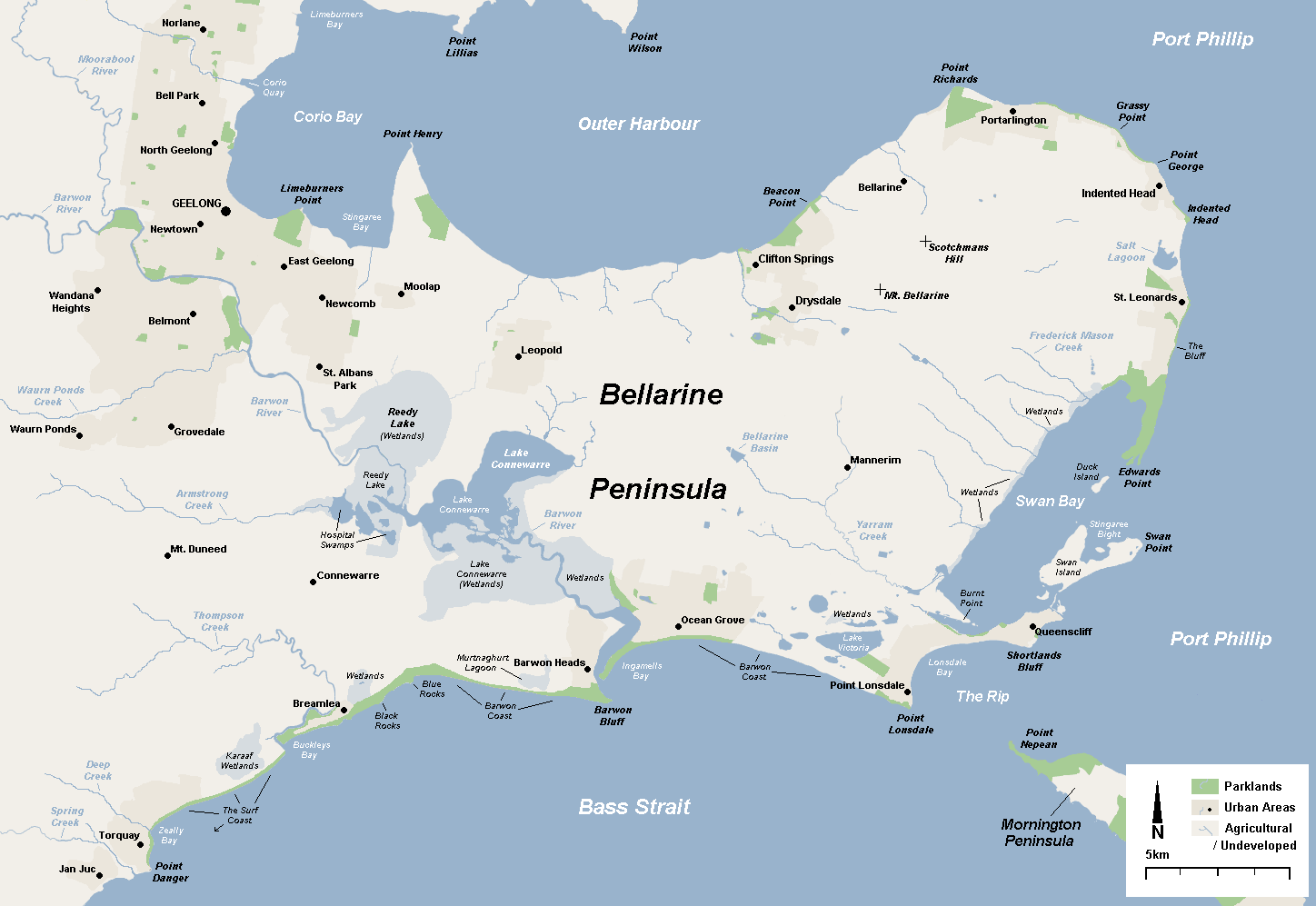
Map of the Bellarine Peninsula.

The Bellarine Peninsula (/ˌbɛləˈriːn/ bel-uh-REEN; Wadawurrung: Balla-wein or Biteyong) is a peninsula located south-west of Melbourne in Victoria, Australia, surrounded by Port Phillip, Corio Bay and Bass Strait. The peninsula, together with the Mornington Peninsula, separates Port Phillip Bay from Bass Strait. The peninsula itself was originally occupied by Indigenous Australian clans of the Wadawurrung nation, prior to European settlement in the early 19th century. Early European settlements were initially centred on wheat and grain agriculture, before the area became a popular tourist destination with most visitors arriving by paddle steamer on Port Phillip in the late 19th century.

Today, approximately 70,000 people live on the Bellarine, and this population doubles at peak periods during summer. The peninsula is a growing tourist region with a variety of beaches and seaside resorts and wineries; most of the peninsula is a part of the City of Greater Geelong.

== History ==
The area of Geelong and the Bellarine Peninsula was originally occupied by Indigenous Australian clans of the Wadawurrung nation, prior to European settlement in the early 19th century. This area was a favourite and extensive camping place for the Wadawurrung people. One Wadawurrung name for the area is 'Balla-wein' which refers to 'balla' meaning 'elbow' or 'reclining at the elbow'. The convict William Buckley escaped from the Sullivan Bay settlement in 1803, and lived among the Wadawurrung people for 32 years on the Bellarine Peninsula. In 1835, John Batman used Indented Head as his base camp, leaving behind several employees whilst he returned to Tasmania (then known as Van Diemen's Land) for more supplies and his family. In this same year, Buckley surrendered to the party led by John Helder Wedge and was later pardoned by Lieutenant-Governor Sir George Arthur, and subsequently given the position of interpreter to the natives.

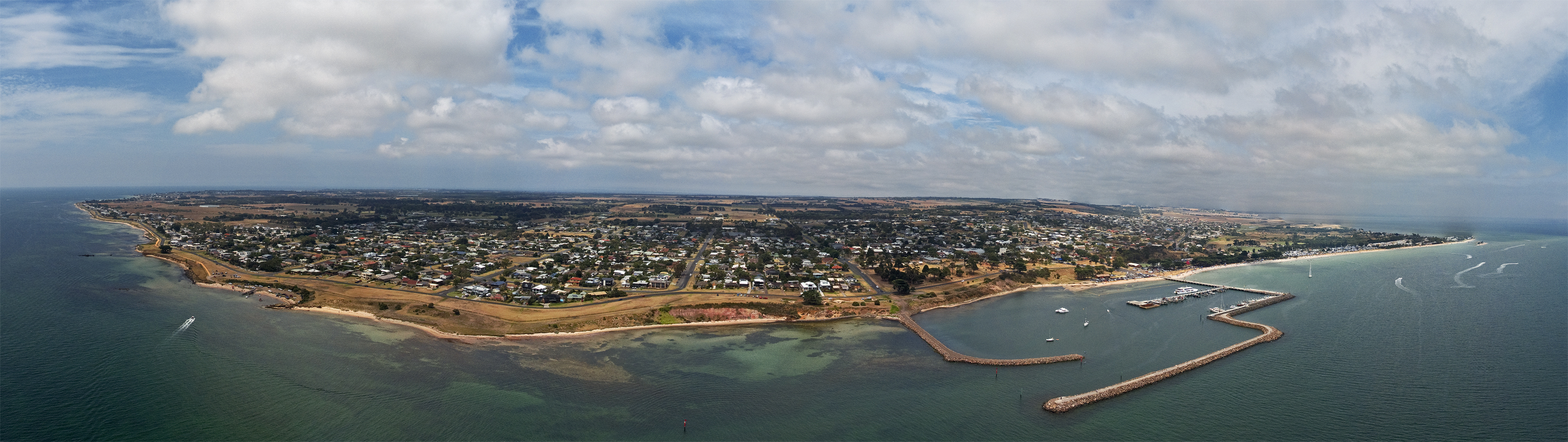
Portarlington from the air, 2018

By the 1850s, the peninsula was known as ‘the granary of the colony’ and Portarlington became a major player in the wheat industry. Transport was by sea on Port Phillip Bay due to the poor roads. By the 1870s, excursion traffic to the peninsula commenced, with tourists travelling from Melbourne by paddle steamers to enjoy fishing and swimming by the bay, with the coastal towns being major holiday resorts. In 1879, one of the first branch railways was built in Victoria, from South Geelong station to Drysdale and Queenscliff. Encouraging the growth in agricultural production and leading to the decline in the bay steamer traffic to towns along the way, the line did not close until 1976.

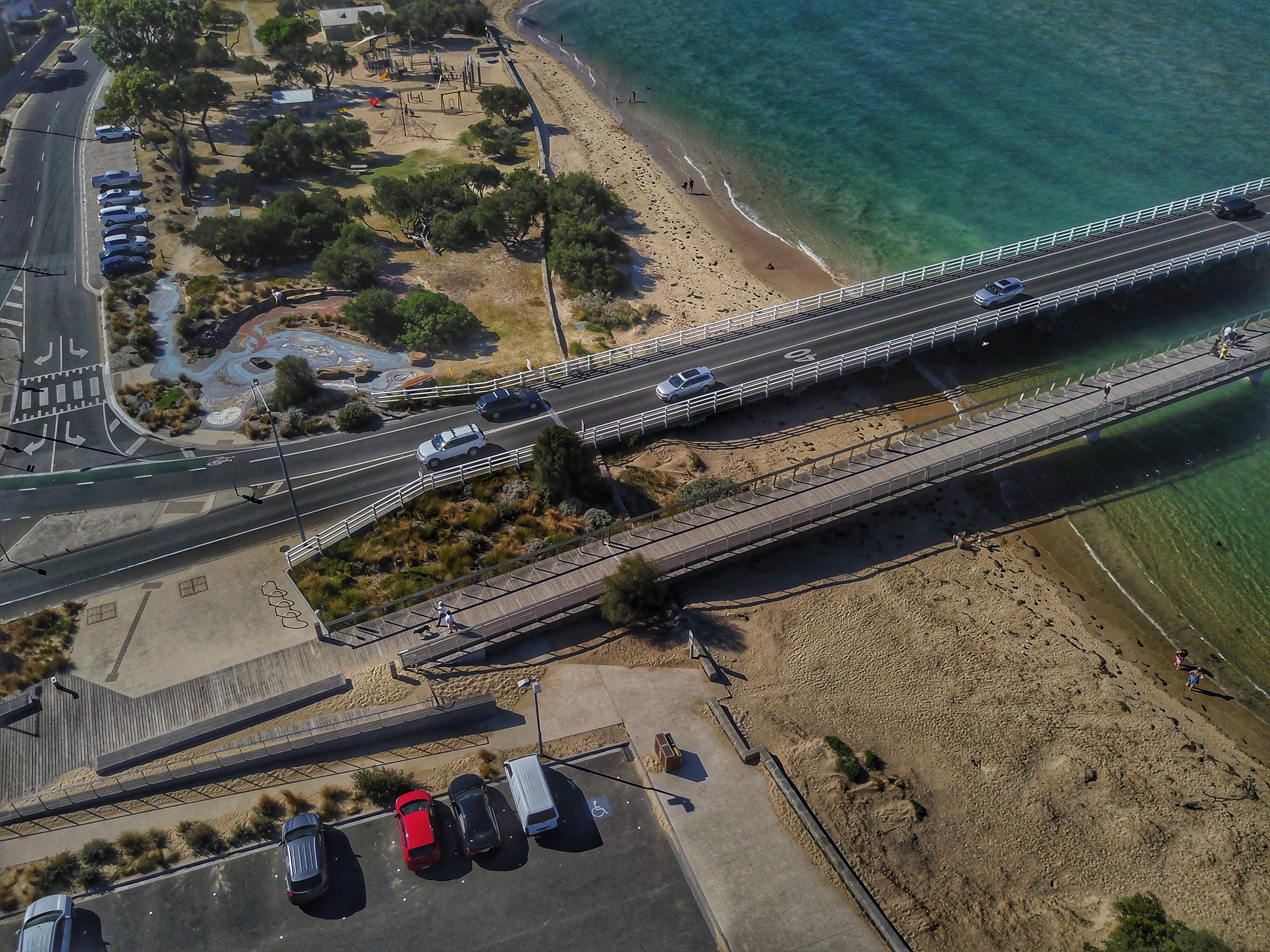
Aerial perspective of Barwon Heads Bridge

In recent years, with improved roads, the peninsula has become popular with people employed in Geelong, with population growth in towns such as Leopold, Drysdale and Ocean Grove. The Seachange demographic phenomenon has also led to increased growth. Ironically, the Australian TV series SeaChange was filmed at various locations on the peninsula, particularly at Barwon Heads, which helped promote tourism on the peninsula. The peninsula is showing signs of environmental consciousness and attitudes towards sustainability, much the same as the Mornington Peninsula.

== Geography ==
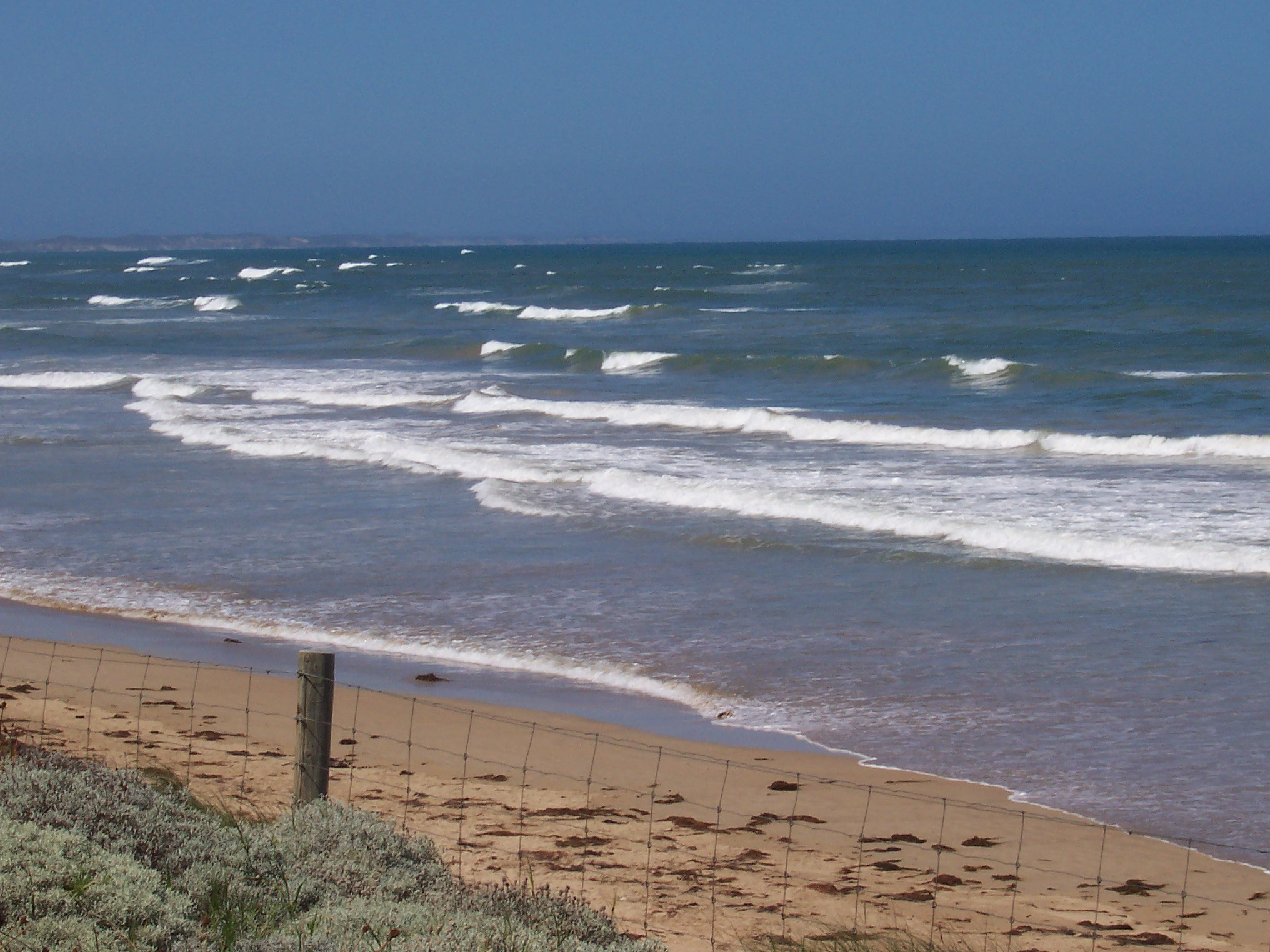
Ocean Grove beach on Bass Strait

The Bellarine Peninsula is a gently to moderately undulating landform that protrudes in an east and north-easterly direction into Port Phillip. The peninsula is generally considered to begin its protrusion between the town of Torquay and east of Geelong. It is surrounded by Corio Bay and the Outer Harbour to the north, Port Phillip to the north-east and east, The Rip to the south-east and Bass Strait to the south.

The peninsula's eastern regions host several bays and islands such as The Rip, Lonsdale Bay, Swan Bay, Swan Island, Rabbit Island and various other small islands. The central and north-eastern regions host a gently undulating topography with no major rivers, mountains or significant landforms. The most distinct feature in the western region of the peninsula is the Barwon River which flows through a series of large lakes and extensive wetlands before emptying into Bass Strait at Barwon Heads.

=== Geology ===
The uplifted block of the Bellarine Peninsula forms a very weakly dissected undulating plain of low elevation, less than 150m. Drainage from the remnant basalts of the Palaeogene Older Volcanics forms a vaguely radial pattern on the elevated plateau. A narrow strip of deeply weathered Cretaceous Otway Group rocks occurs in outcrop along the southern edge of the Curlewis Monocline, which forms the northern boundary of the peninsula. Landslides and narrow gullies have formed along the northern edge of the monocline. A sheet of marine sands of Late Neogene age covers the southern portion of the uplifted Bellarine block.

The majority of soils on the peninsula consist of grey-brown sedimentary sandy loams, overlaying medium to heavy textured clay. The Bellarine Hills are a significant variation with heavy black self mulching clay loams being well suited to intensive crop production. Mining of shell grit for glass making was an important industry on the shores of Swan Bay.

=== Flora and fauna ===
Much of the native vegetation throughout the peninsula has been cleared for agriculture, notable exceptions being areas of land around Swan Bay, parklands in Portarlington, coastal areas along the Barwon Coast and some small remnant pockets around the Barwon River lakes and wetlands, many of these last remaining areas are protected or included in parklands. The largest area of original native woodland vegetation remaining on the Peninsula lies in the 143 hectare Ocean Grove Nature Reserve.

The peninsula contains several significant wetlands, many of which form part of the Port Phillip Bay (Western Shoreline) and Bellarine Peninsula Ramsar Site and are of international significance for the protection of waterbirds and the critically endangered orange-bellied parrot. They are also recognised by BirdLife International in the Bellarine Wetlands and Swan Bay and Port Phillip Bay Islands Important Bird Areas.

Brushtail and Ringtail Possums (Wadawurrung: 'Walert' for Brushtail and 'Barnong' for Ringtail) are endemic to the region and live within the Townships, Swamp Wallabies also live in the Ocean Grove Nature Reserve.

Marine mammals visit here include whales (southern right and southern humpback), endemic Burrunan dolphins, Australian fur seals, and Australian sea lions.

== Demographics ==
The peninsula is covered by two local government areas with a population of approximately 70,000. 35 per cent of residents on the Bellarine are aged sixty years or older, which is significantly higher than the national average of 23 per cent.

The Borough of Queenscliffe, situated on the peninsula, is the last remaining borough left in Victoria, and was the only local government area not changed in the mass Victorian municipality reorganisation of 1993 enacted by then Liberal Premier Jeff Kennett. The remainder of the peninsula is part of the City of Greater Geelong, having been part of the Rural City of Bellarine before this time. The peninsula is also one of the parishes of the County of Grant, one of the Cadastral divisions of Australia.

== Shipwrecks ==
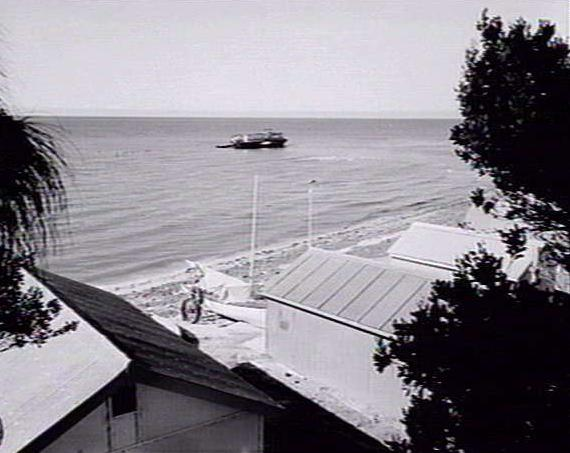
The wreck of the Ozone, offshore at Indented Head.

Some of the more significant and historical shipwrecks include;

- Earl of Charlemont - sunk off the coast of Barwon Heads in (1853)
- Mountain Maid - sunk off Swan Island after a collision with the SS Queen (1856)
- Ozone - scuttled off Indented Head (1925)
- HMAS J3 - scuttled in Swan Bay (1926)

== Transport ==
- Road: The Bellarine Highway is the major road link, running east from Geelong though the middle of the peninsula to Queenscliff. The Geelong-Portarlington Road is an important road link to the northern peninsula towns of Curlewis, Drysdale, Clifton Springs, and the newly built Drysdale Bypass continues on to St Leonards, Indented Head and Portarlington. Grubb Road runs north-south across the peninsula, linking Drysdale and Ocean Grove.
- Ferry: Port Phillip Ferries have run a twice-daily fast passenger service from Portarlington to Docklands since 2016. Searoad Ferries operates a roll on/roll off vehicle ferry service from Queenscliff on the Bellarine to Sorrento on the Mornington Peninsula and has done so since 1987.
- Bus: The Bellarine Transit System operated by McHarry's Buslines provides bus-based public transport to towns on the peninsula.
- Train: The Queenscliff railway is no longer operational for commuter services, however the Bellarine Railway operates tourist services between Drysdale and Queenscliff on the former Victorian Railways line. Alongside it runs the Bellarine Rail Trail, which continues into Geelong.
- Bicycle: The Bellarine Rail Trail runs from South Geelong station to Queenscliff and is a combination of sealed and well-made gravel surfaces. The distance is 32 km. There is much road cycling on the Bellarine, with some of the roads having dedicated bike lanes.

== Utilities ==
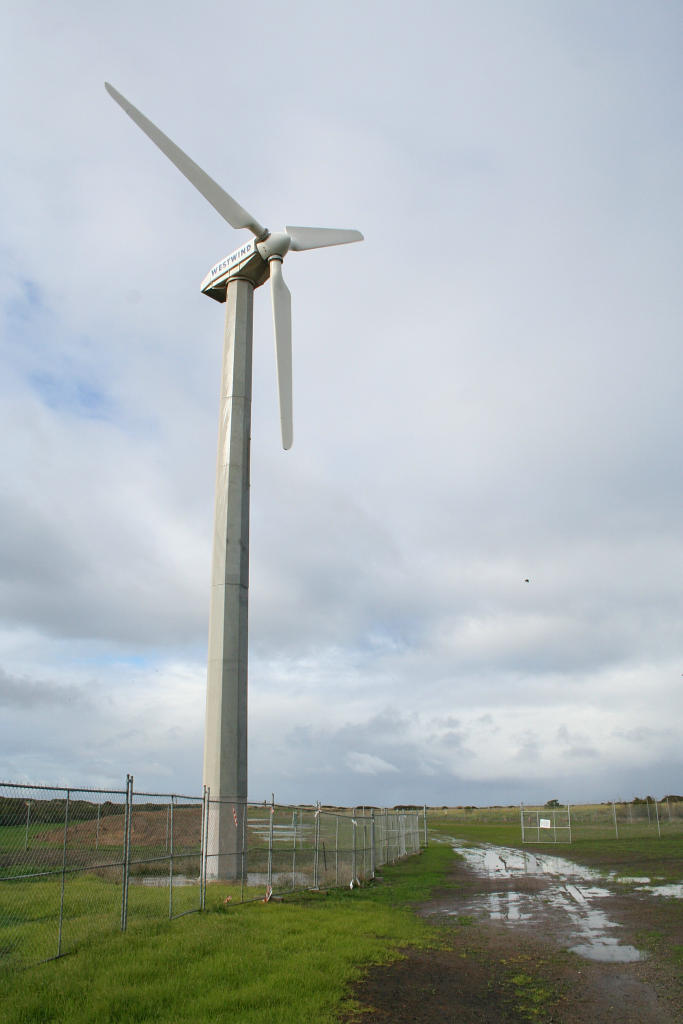
Wind generator at Breamlea, built 1987, photo taken in 2007

Black Rock on the southern coast (near Breamlea) is the location of the main ocean outfall for Geelong's sewage. Opened in 1915, initially the sewage was left untreated before being discharged into the ocean. A primary filtration system was installed in the 1970s, and in the 1980s the current plant was built with an upgraded filtration system, along with a 1.2 kilometre long ocean outfall. The plant was upgraded in 1997, with secondary filtration introduced, and a pipeline installed to transport recycled water to the flower farm at Torquay.

A 60 kW capacity wind generator is located on Black Rock Road in Breamlea. Erected in November 1987 by the then State Electricity Commission of Victoria and the Victorian Solar Energy Council (now Energy Victoria) as a demonstration, it was sold in 1994 to the Alternative Technology Association of Melbourne. Electricity production ceased at 1200hrs on 17 May 2003 due to an electrical generator burn-out, caused by moisture, salt, and electrical flash-over. The wind generator remains in place today intact.

== See also ==
- Edwards Point
- Lake Connewarre
  - Lake Connewarre State Wildlife Reserve
- Lake Victoria
- Swan Bay
- Swan Island
- William Buckley (convict)
- Fort Queenscliff
- Mornington Peninsula
