= Swan Island (Victoria) =

Coordinates: 38°15′00″S 144°40′45″E

- Town
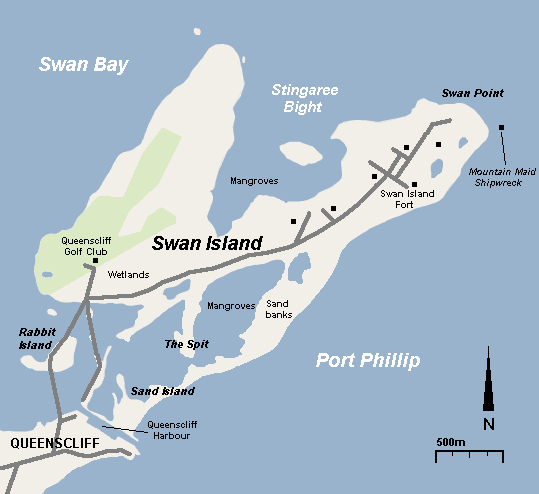
- Map of Swan Island
- Country: Australia
- State: Victoria
- LGA: Borough of Queenscliffe

Government
  - State electorate: Bellarine
  - Federal division: Corangamite

Area
  - Total: 1.40 km^{2} (0.54 sq mi)
- Postcode: 3225
Localities around Swan Island
Swan Bay	Port Phillip Bay	Port Phillip Bay
Swan Bay	Swan Island	Port Phillip Bay
Queenscliff	Queenscliff	Port Phillip Bay

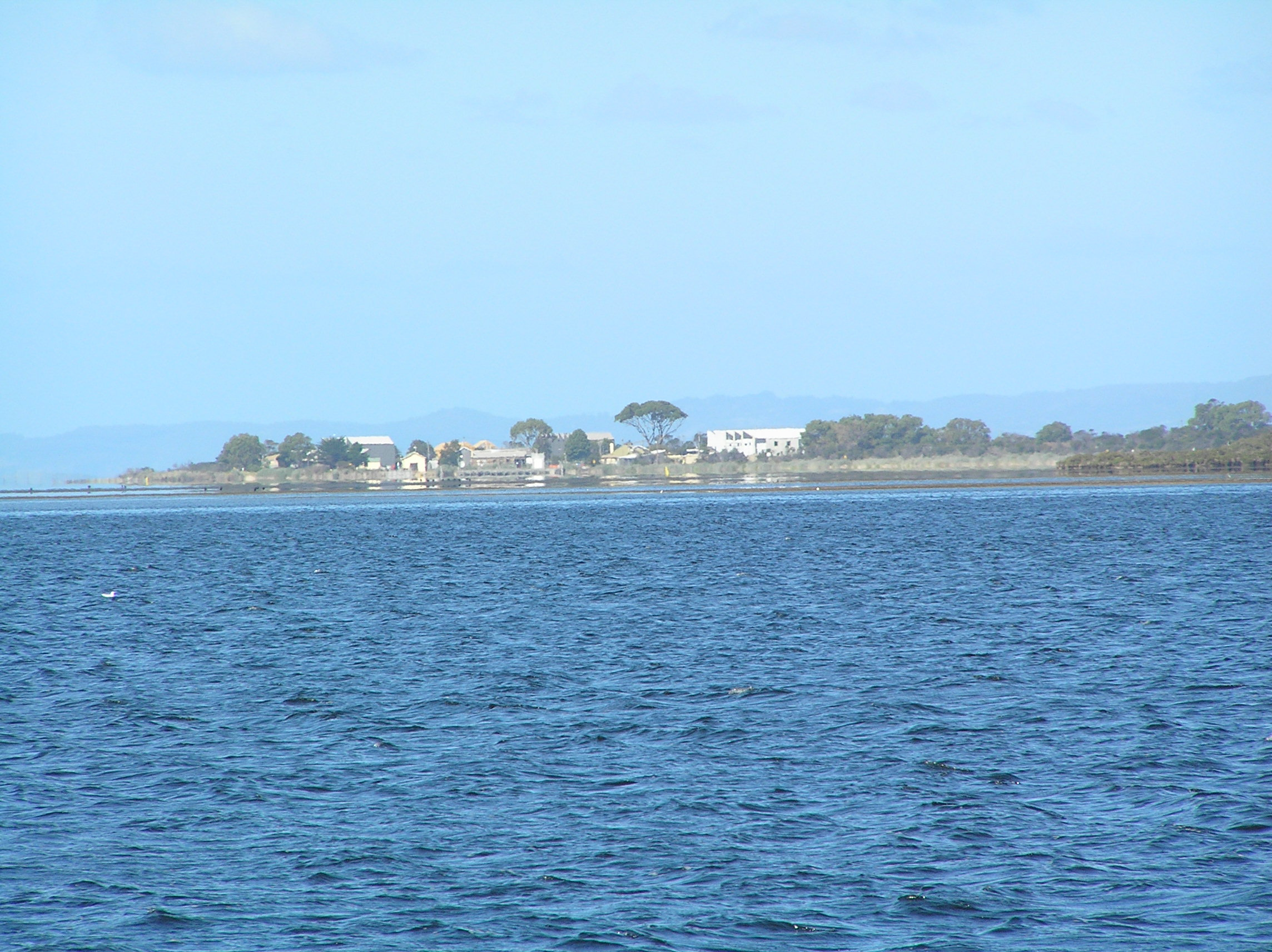
Swan Island, view from Swan Bay Jetty

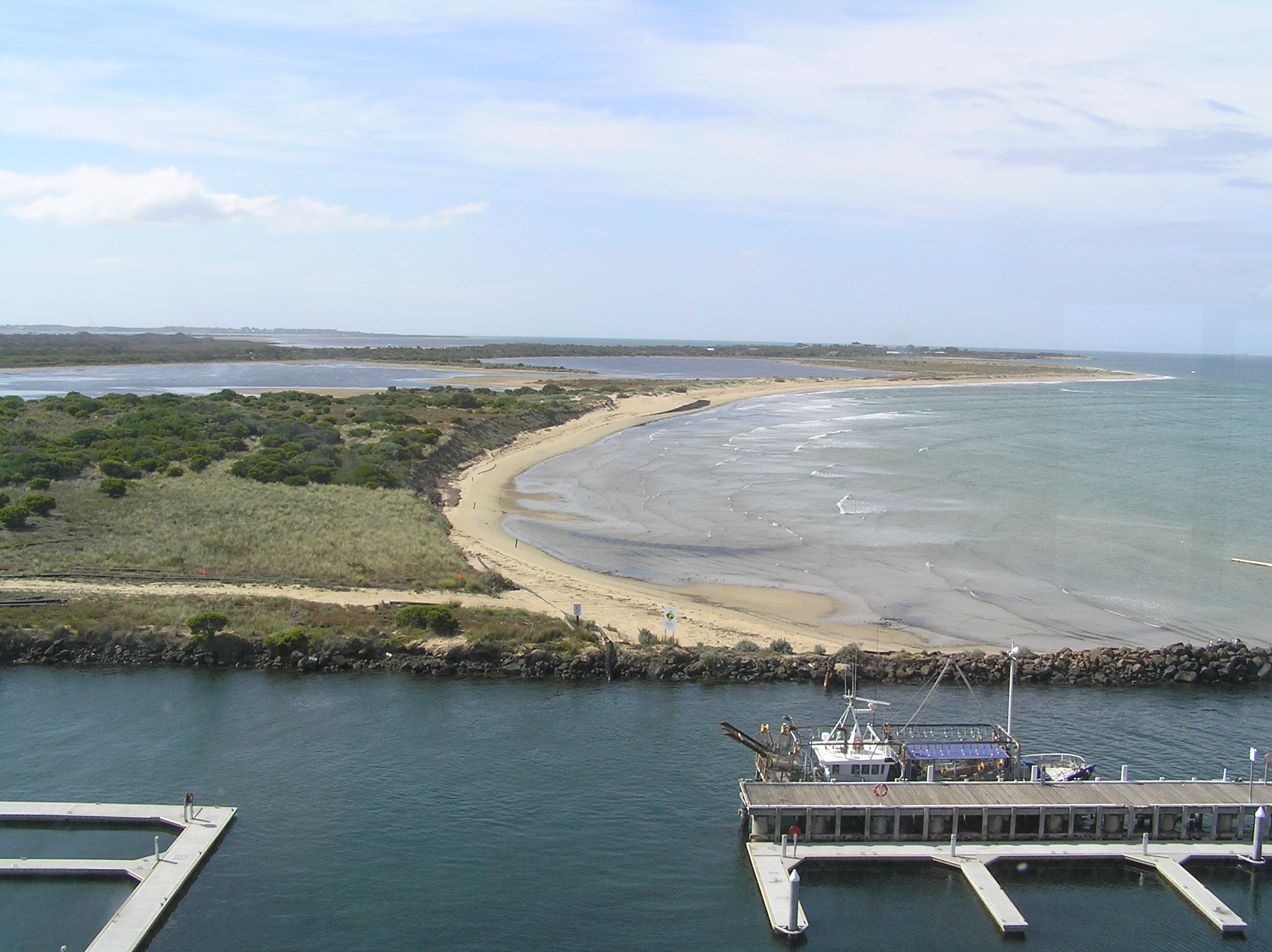
View across Queenscliff Harbour to Sand Island and Swan Island

Swan Island (Wathaurong: Woorang-a'look) is a 1.4 km^{2} sand barrier island which, with Duck Island and the Edwards Point spit, separate Swan Bay from Port Phillip in Victoria, Australia. It lies close to and north of the town of Queenscliff at the eastern end of the Bellarine Peninsula, and is an official bounded locality of the Borough of Queenscliffe.

== Description ==
=== Swan Island ===
Swan Island is home to the Queenscliff Golf Club on land leased from Defence, which occupies the western end of the island, and to the Department of Defence, which operates a training facility occupying the central and eastern parts of the island. It also serves as the land access point for the Queenscliff Cruising Yacht Club on Sand Island. It can be reached by a one-lane vehicular bridge and causeway from Queenscliff via the small saltmarsh-covered Rabbit Island. Access to both Swan and Sand Islands is restricted to members of the golf and yacht clubs, Defence Department personnel, or by permit, with the only road guarded by a security gate. The bay between the western and eastern lobes of the island is Stingaree Bight.

=== Sand Island ===
Swan Island now adjoins Sand Island, formed by the cutting of a channel between Port Phillip and Swan Bay to make the entrance to Queenscliff Harbour. The continual maintenance pumping of sand from the harbour's entrance channel to keep it navigable has resulted in longshore drift of sand north-eastwards to connect Sand Island with Swan Island and create two lagoons.

== Environment ==
Swan Island's natural vegetation includes areas of coastal scrub, relict patches of coastal woodland and extensive areas of saltmarsh. The island is part of the Swan Bay and Port Phillip Bay Islands Important Bird Area, identified as such by BirdLife International because of its importance for orange-bellied parrots, waders and seabirds. It is ornithologically notable for the critically endangered orange-bellied parrot, for which the saltmarsh serves as one of its few regular wintering sites. Sand Island contains saltmarsh-fringed lagoons bordered in the east by colonising shrubs and grasses on newly formed dunes; its accreting eastern beach, now connected to Swan Island, forms an important high tide roosting area for the migratory waders that feed on the Swan Bay mudflats at low tide, while the lagoons are much used by black swans and other waterbirds.

== History ==
The island was named by Acting Lieutenant John Murray when he entered Port Phillip in the ship Lady Nelson in February 1802.

Swan Island has a long history of military use, being part of the fortifications built to protect the entrance to Port Phillip Bay from a feared Russian invasion during the Crimean War in the 1850s. The fortifications of Swan Island were controlled by the fire command at Fort Queenscliff. During the First World War, the Navy used it as a depot for sea mines.

The island was linked to the Queenscliff railway station by a 3-foot gauge tramway for transport of goods for military purposes between 1886 and 1958.

=== Shipwrecks ===
The wooden cargo brig Mountain Maid sank off Swan Island in 1856 following a collision with another vessel. It is a well known dive wreck.

The J-class submarine HMAS J3 was scuttled off the north-east point of Swan Island in 1924 once its services were no longer required.

The Colonial Service torpedo boat HMVS Countess of Hopetoun's hull was scuttled here in 1925 after being stripped of valuable objects. Her bow protruded from the water afterwards, for an indeterminable amount of time.

=== Swan Island Training Area ===
Swan Island is owned by the Federal Government. In the past, portions were controlled by both the Department of Navy and the Department of Army. In 1961, when the Department of Navy vacated their portion, the Department of Army stated that their portion was leased to civil interests and that by mid-1961 they would control the entire facility.

The Army Reserve 1st Commando Regiment administers the Swan Island Army Detachment (SIAD) with its training activities classified. A former SIAD instructor reportedly said "It is more like a finishing school or a centre of learning for the non-gun stuff". On 9 April 2007, three Special Air Service Regiment soldiers from Perth completing a course on Swan Island were involved in a car accident after returning from a Queenscliff hotel and died.

In 2006, the Minister of Defence responded to a question in parliament regarding the Swan Island Training Area that "Swan Island is a Military Exercise Area. It provides a venue for naval training in the use of radar flares, facilities for Army Reserve training and a small demolitions range for Army use." "... some activities are classified."

Authors Brian Toohey and William Pinwill made claims, in their 1989 book titled Oyster: The Story of the Australian Secret Intelligence Service that the Australian Secret Intelligence Service (ASIS) acquired the Department of Navy portion in 1961 for a training facility, none of which have ever been substantiated. Years before publishing the book, in 1983, SIAD provided training to a covert action paramilitary ASIS program started that year, for ASIS officers and ASIS recruited civilian trainees, to establish a team to recover Australians held by terrorists overseas. The program became public on 30 November 1983 following an exercise at the Sheraton Hotel in Melbourne. A Royal Commission recommendation implemented abolished the Ministerial Directive permitting ASIS to undertake covert action.

In April 2004, with the passing of the Intelligence Services Act 2001, ASIS was permitted to be involved in paramilitary activities outside of Australia, including the passive use of weapons and self-defence techniques. It is presumed that ASIS is receiving training from SIAD in the use of weapons and self-defence techniques for its officers.

Anti-war protestors regularly protest at the training area, enter and are arrested by Victoria Police charged with Commonwealth trespass and plead guilty to the offence at court. In 2014, eight anti-war protestors trespassed into the training area then split up into pairs, with four detained by SIAD soldiers with claims by the protestors of heavy-handed tactics by the detaining soldiers who hooded, tied and stripped them, and four were detained by Victoria Police, all pleaded guilty to trespassing. An inquiry by Defence resulted in soldiers being counselled over the manner and measure of their response.

== See also ==
- Fort Monckton claimed to be the United Kingdom Secret Intelligence Service field operations training centre.
