= Port Phillip Heads Marine National Park =

Protected area in Victoria, Australia

- IUCN category II (national park)
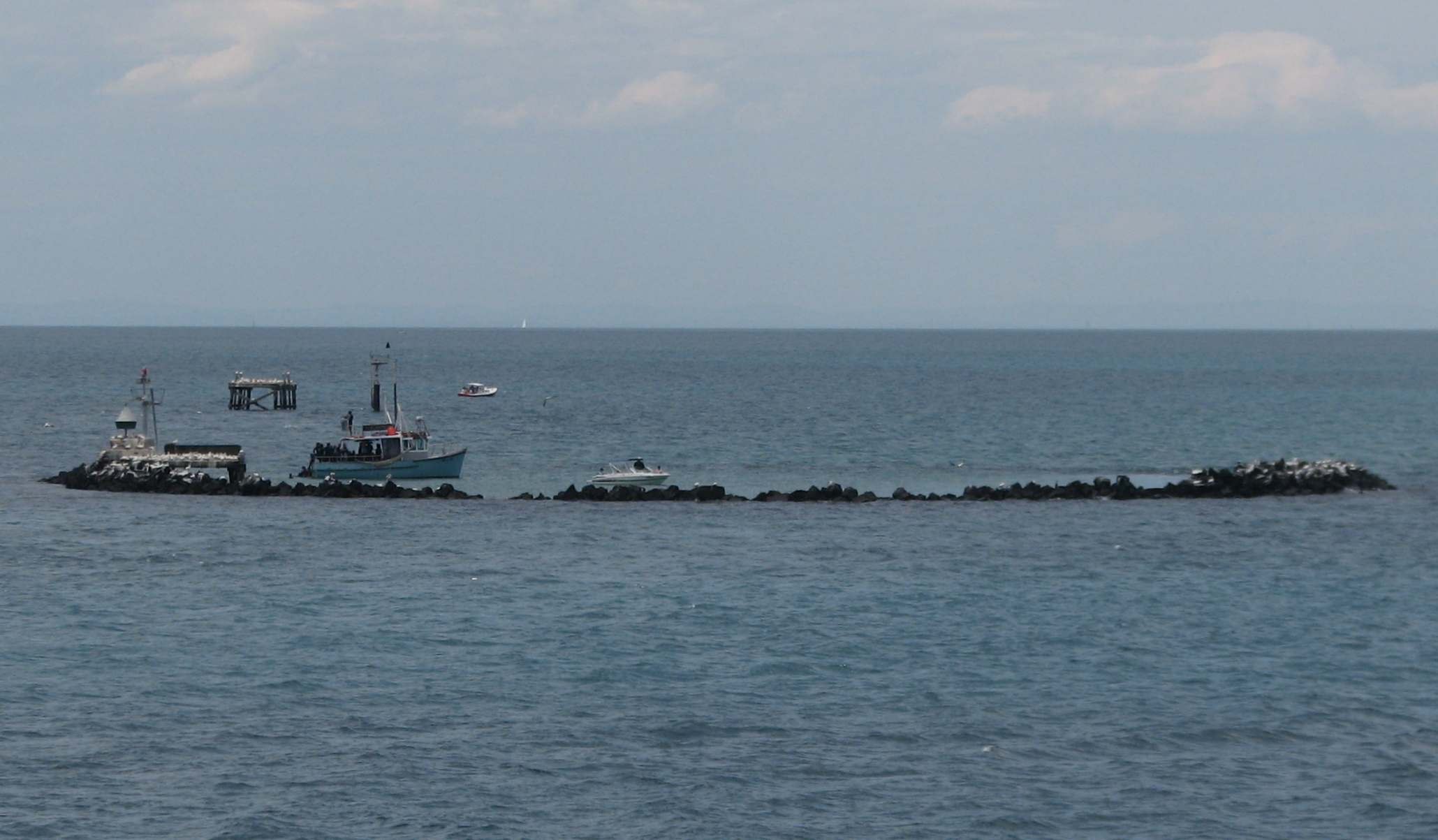
- Pope's Eye fort located within the marine park.

- Location within Victoria
- Location: Victoria
- Nearest city: Melbourne
- Coordinates: 38°16′45″S 144°42′55″E
- Area: 35.8 km^{2} (13.8 sq mi)
- Established: 16 November 2002
- Governing body: Parks Victoria
- Website: Official website

The Port Phillip Heads Marine National Park is a marine protected area located in the vicinity of the bay of Port Phillip, between the Bellarine and Mornington Peninsulas, in Victoria, Australia. The 3,580-hectare (8,800-acre) marine national park comprises six separate sites located approximately 60 kilometres (37 mi) south-west of Melbourne and stretches along 40 kilometres (25 mi) of coastline of Victoria.

== Location and features ==
The marine national park was created on 16 November 2002 and represents an expansion of, as well as giving stronger protection to, areas previously collectively termed the Harold Holt Marine Reserve system. The park is assigned the IUCN's Category II of the United Nations’ List of National Parks and Protected Areas, showing that the park is managed by Parks Victoria primarily for ecosystem protection and recreation.

The six sites in the marine national park are Mud Islands, Point Lonsdale, Point Nepean, Pope's Eye, Portsea Hole, and Swan Bay.

The closest towns to the areas include St Leonards, Queenscliff, Portsea and Point Lonsdale.

Habitats protected by the marine national park include seagrass meadows, kelp forests, intertidal and subtidal rocky reefs, sandy beaches and deeper marine environments. Animals protected include many species of waders, waterbirds and seabirds, as well as Australian fur seals, Burrunan dolphins, fish and a wide range of marine invertebrates. It also protects areas and items of historic, archaeological and cultural significance.

Additional and overlapping protection is given to some areas of the marine national park through the Ramsar Convention, which lists Swan Bay and Mud Islands as parts of the Port Phillip Bay (Western Shoreline) and Bellarine Peninsula Ramsar Site as wetlands of international importance.

=== Threats ===
A proposal to dredge mechanically the entrance to Port Phillip and sections of the main shipping channel to the Port of Melbourne, in order to facilitate access by larger ships, has the potential to cause extensive turbidity, the release of toxic sediments and mechanical damage to reefs, threatening benthic communities as well as affecting economic activities in the bay such as diving businesses and fishing.

== See also ==
- Protected areas of Victoria
