= Swan Bay =

Bay in Victoria, Australia

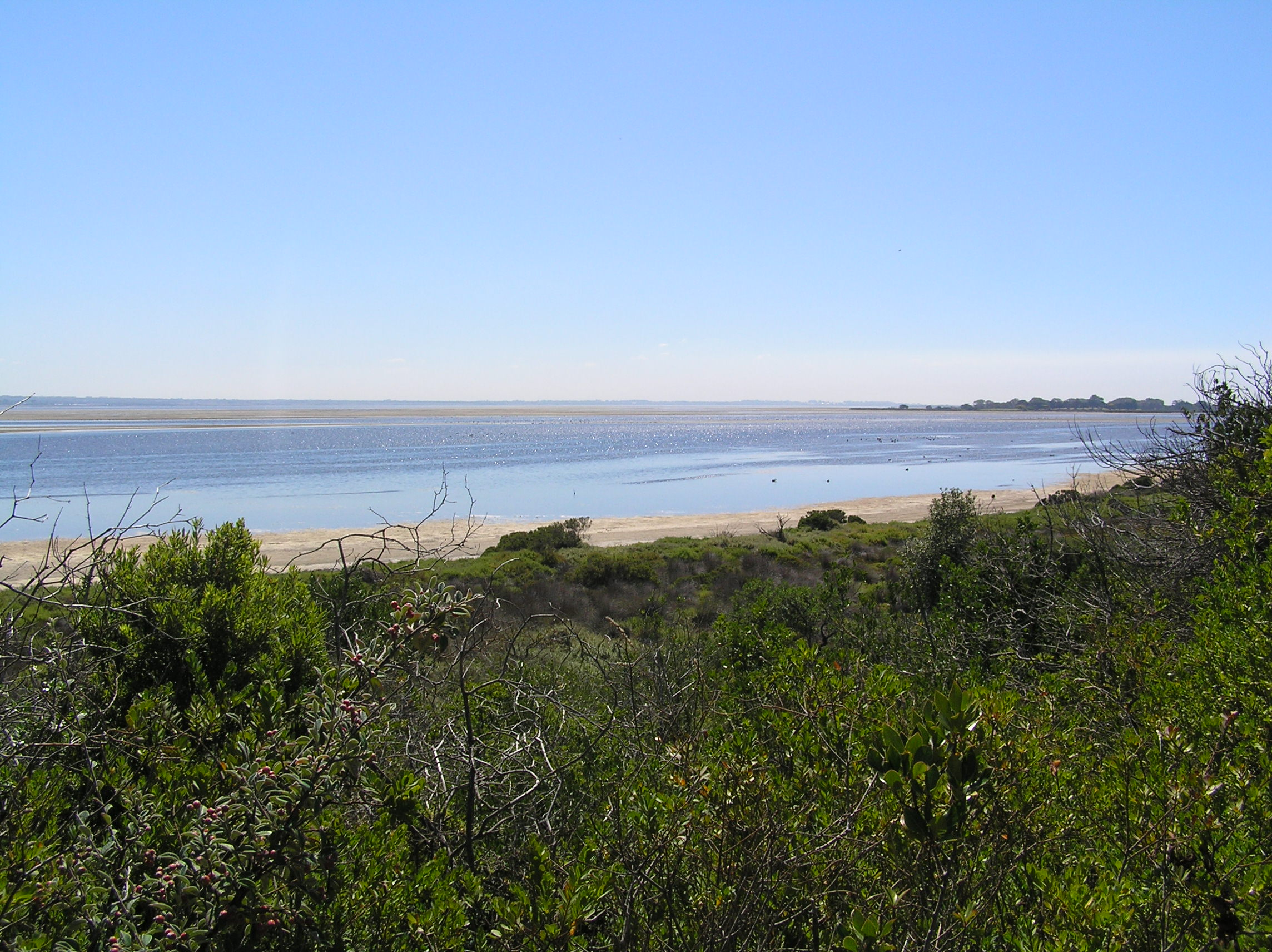
- Swan Bay at low tide, looking north from Queenscliff

- Location in Victoria

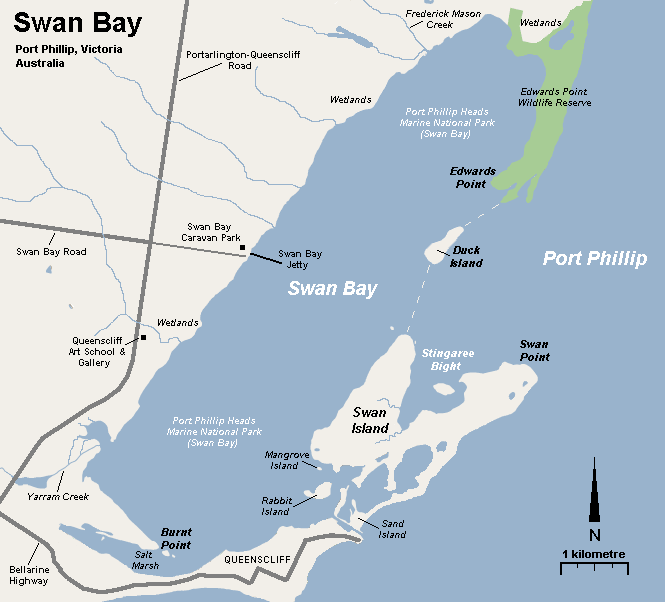
- Map of Swan Bay
- Location: Bellarine Peninsula, Victoria
- Coordinates: 38°13′43″S 144°39′12″E
- Type: Saline, Permanent, Natural
- Primary inflows: Yarram Creek, Frederick Mason Creek
- Primary outflows: Port Phillip
- Basin countries: Australia
- Surface area: 30 km^{2} (12 sq mi)
- Average depth: 2 m (6 ft 7 in)
- Max. depth: 5 m (16 ft)
- Islands: Duck, Mangrove, Rabbit, Sand, Stingaree, Swan, Tip
- Settlements: Queenscliff, St Leonards

The Swan Bay is a shallow, 30-square-kilometre (12 sq mi) marine embayment at the eastern end of the Bellarine Peninsula in Port Phillip, Victoria, Australia. The township of Queenscliff lies at its southern end, and St Leonards at its northern. It is partly separated from Port Phillip by Swan Island, Duck Island and Edwards Point. Most of the area is included in the Port Phillip Heads Marine National Park as well as being listed as a wetland of international importance under the Ramsar Convention as part of the Port Phillip Bay (Western Shoreline) and Bellarine Peninsula Ramsar Site. The bay is part of the Swan Bay and Port Phillip Bay Islands Important Bird Area, identified as such by BirdLife International because of its importance for orange-bellied parrots, waders and seabirds.

Matthew Flinders named the bay "Swan Ponds" after its black swans, up to 2,700 of which can be seen in summer and early autumn.

== Ecology ==
Swan Bay contains a variety of ecosystems that make it environmentally important for waterbirds and migratory waders. These include salt marsh, intertidal mudflats and vast seagrass beds on which, almost everything living in the bay relies on for food. Although much of the surrounding land is farmland, some remnant woodland survives in the adjoining Edwards Point Nature Reserve and Swan Bay itself. The bay has been recognised as having international importance and the Port Phillip Heads Marine National Park almost entirely occupies the bay.

Nearly 200 species of birds have been recorded in Swan bay. Birds of conservation significance for which the bay and its shore are internationally important include the critically endangered orange-bellied parrot as well as little tern, fairy tern, eastern curlew, Lewin's rail and white-bellied sea eagle. It also supports over 1% of the Australian population of four wader species: Grey plover, Pacific golden plover, double-banded plover and eastern curlew. Other birds found in the region include the Australian pelican, silver gull, royal spoonbill, Caspian and crested terns, white-fronted chat, sacred ibis, red-necked stint, little pied cormorant and pied oystercatcher. Some of these birds travel from as far away as Arctic Siberia and Alaska where they breed, to feed on the intertidal mudflats of Swan Bay.

== Geography ==
Swan Bay lies at the eastern end of the Bellarine Peninsula in Port Phillip. It is partly separated from Port Phillip by Swan Island, Duck Island and Edwards Point. Islands located within the bay include Mangrove Island, Rabbit Island, Sand Island, Stingaree Island and Tip Island.

== Recreation ==
Recreation in the bay mainly revolves around sightseeing activities such as sea kayaking, scuba diving, bird watching and various wildlife tours. Boating is limited in Swan Bay, particularly around Swan Island and in Stingaree Bight, there is a 5 knot speed limit and many areas of the bay become very shallow at low tide.

== Myths ==
There is supposedly a treasure hidden in a cave on the southern shoreline of Swan Bay. The myth revolves around the pirate Benito "Bloody Sword" Bonito, who raided the west coast of the Americas. His career began around 1818 but from there on sources differ. According to one legend his ship was boarded by a British man-of-war after Bonito exited Port Phillip after hiding a treasure in Swan Bay, apparently the so-called "Lost Loot of Lima", sometime in 1821. He was subsequently given a trial and hanged.
