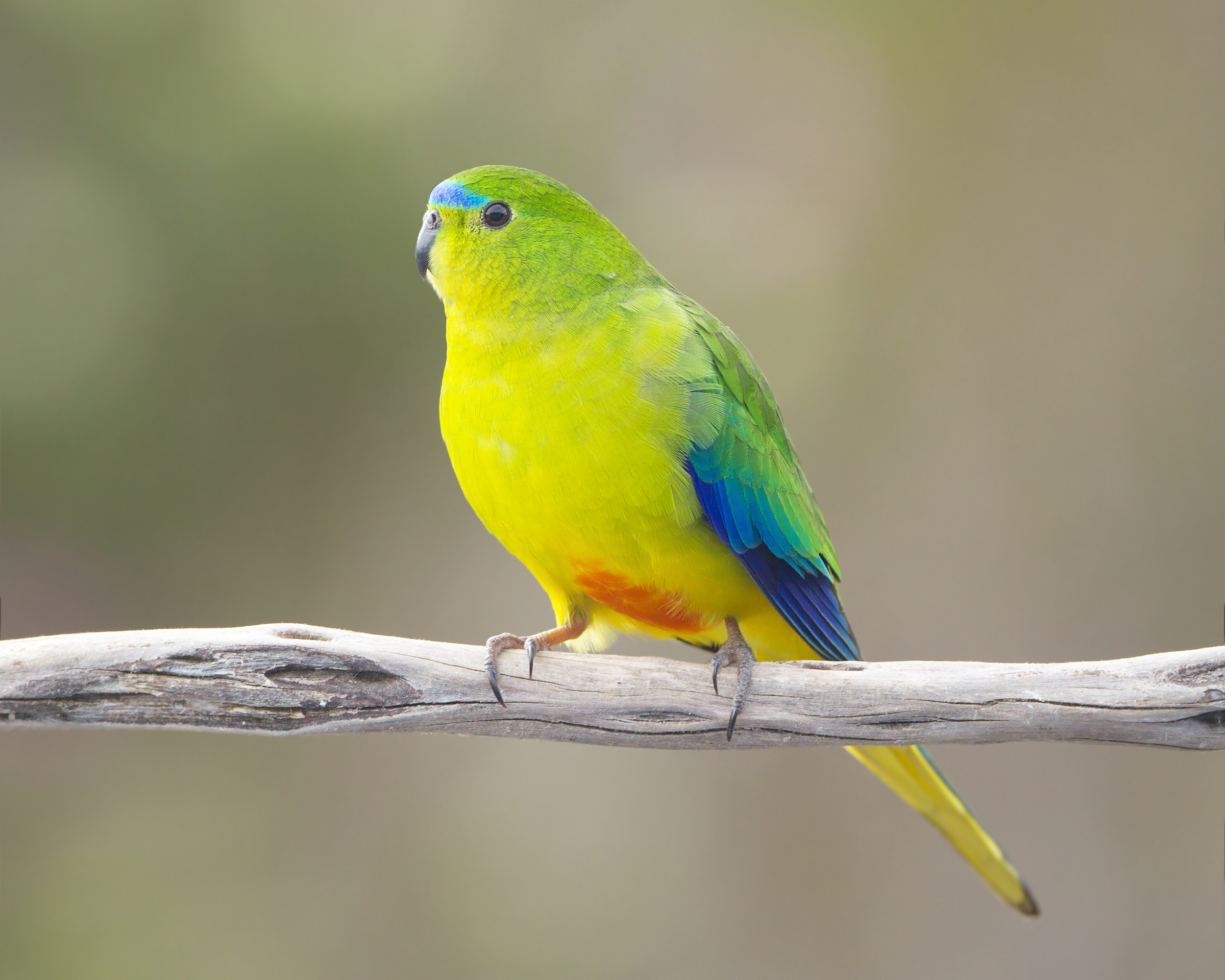
- Male in South West Tasmania

Conservation status
- Critically Endangered (IUCN 3.1)
- CITES Appendix I

Scientific classification
- Kingdom: Animalia
- Phylum: Chordata
- Class: Aves
- Order: Psittaciformes
- Family: Psittaculidae
- Genus: Neophema
- Species: N. chrysogaster

Binomial name
- Neophema chrysogaster (Latham, 1790)

Synonyms
- Euphema aurantia Gould, 1841; Nanodes gouldii Ewing, 1841; Psephotus chrysogaster mab Mathews, 1912; Neonanodes chrysogaster wallicus Mathews, 1924

= Orange-bellied parrot =

Species of bird

The orange-bellied parrot (Neophema chrysogaster) is a small parrot endemic to southern Australia, and one of only three species of parrot that migrate. It was described by John Latham in 1790. A small parrot around 20 cm (8 in) long, it exhibits sexual dimorphism. The adult male is distinguished by its bright grass-green upper parts, yellow underparts and orange belly patch. The adult female and juvenile are duller green in colour. All birds have a prominent two-toned blue frontal band and blue outer wing feathers.

The orange-bellied parrot breeds in Tasmania and winters on the coast of southern mainland Australia, foraging on saltmarsh species, beach or dune plants and a variety of exotic weed species. The diet consists of seeds and berries of small coastal grasses and shrubs. With a wild population of less than 100 birds, it is rated as a critically endangered species on the International Union for Conservation of Nature (IUCN)'s Red List. However, the species has slowly began to recover, having gone from a wild population of just 14 birds in early February 2017 to 91 birds in November 2025.

Orange-bellied parrots are being bred in a captive breeding program with parrots in Taroona, Tasmania, Healesville Sanctuary, Adelaide Zoo, Moonlit Sanctuary Wildlife Conservation Park and Priam Parrot Breeding Centre. The captive population consists of around 300 birds, with a target of 350 birds by 2016–17. Because of the decline in the wild population in recent years, an additional 21 birds from the wild population were captured in 2010–11 to improve the genetic diversity of the species' captive breeding program. Taken as a whole, the captive population, an example of ex situ conservation, is termed an "insurance population" against extinction.

== Taxonomy and naming ==
The orange-bellied parrot was first described by ornithologist John Latham as Psittacus chrysogaster in 1790, from a specimen (since lost) that had been collected from Adventure Bay in Tasmania in March 1773 on the second voyage of James Cook or in January 1777 on his third voyage, and subsequently been in Joseph Banks' collection. The species name was derived from the Ancient Greek words chrysos ("golden") and gaster ("belly"). John Gould described it in 1841 as Euphema aurantia, from an adult male specimen collected in southeast Tasmania that became the lectotype. The species name was the Latin adjective for "orange". Tasmanian clergyman Thomas James Ewing named it Nanodes gouldii, in honour of Gould, who he believed had discovered it. No subspecies are recognised.

Italian ornithologist Tommaso Salvadori erected the new genus Neophema in 1891, placing the orange-bellied parrot within it and giving it its current scientific name. One of six species of grass parrot in the genus Neophema, it is one of four classified in the subgenus Neonanodes. Analysis of mitochondrial DNA published in 2021 indicated the ancestor of the orange-bellied parrot diverged from a lineage giving rise to the elegant, blue-winged and rock parrots most likely between 2.35 and 3.48 million years ago.

"Orange-bellied parrot" has been designated the official name by the International Ornithologists' Union (IOC). Gould called it the orange-bellied grass parakeet. It has previously been known as the "orange-breasted parrot"—a name given to the orange-bellied parrot in 1926 by the Royal Australasian Ornithologists Union or RAOU (now Birdlife Australia) when the word "belly" was considered inelegant. Other names include yellow-bellied parrot, orange-bellied grass-parakeet, and trumped-up corella.

== Description ==
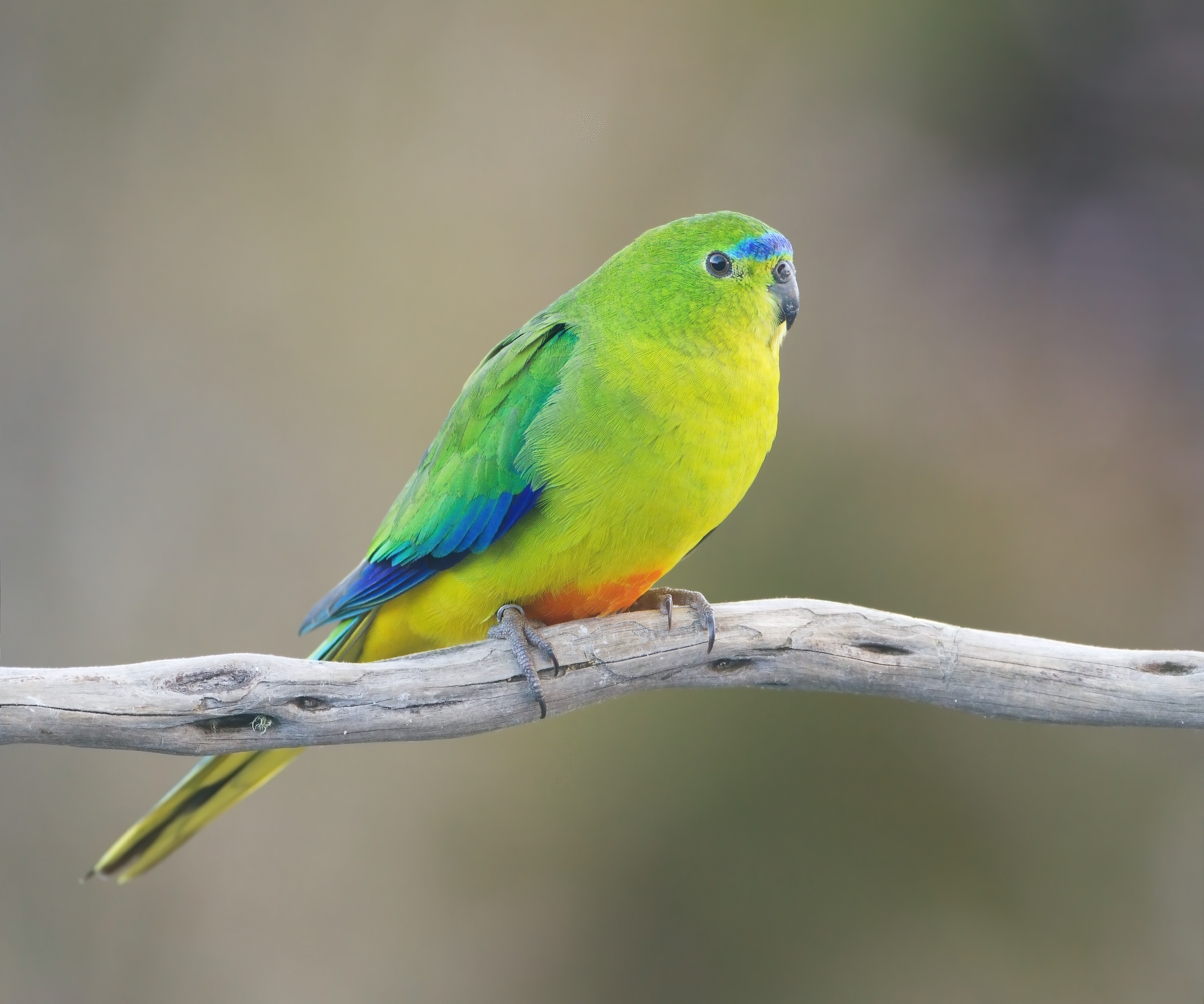
Female or male

The orange-bellied parrot is a small parrot around 20 cm (8 in) long; the adult male has bright green head, neck and upperparts, and yellow-green breast, abdomen and flanks. The feathers of the cheeks, neck and underparts are yellow-green with lime green tips and fringes, and hence appear more bright green when the bird has just moulted and more yellowish as the plumage wears. Feathers on the crown are bright green with darker green tips. It has a prominent, two-toned blue frontal band, with a lighter blue border both above and below the horizontal dark blue band. On the belly is an oval patch of orange around 2 cm in diameter. The undertail coverts are yellow to pale yellow. The uppertail is green-blue with yellow sides. The under wing-coverts and flight feathers are dark blue, with paler blue median wing-coverts. The upper mandible of the bill is blackish grey with a greyish, orange-brown or salmon-coloured base and cutting edge, while the lower mandible a brownish orange a grey-black tip. The cere is blackish grey with a pale brown tinge around the nostrils, the orbital eye-ring is light grey and the iris is dark brown. The legs and feet are dark grey with a red tinge between scales. The adult female has slightly duller shades of green plumage overall, with a paler blue frontal band. Its orange belly patch is about 30% smaller and less distinct. Moulting takes place in late winter and early spring. The juvenile is a duller green to yellow-olive colour overall, with a much less prominent blue frontal band above the eyes. It has a dull yellowish or orange bill, which darkens to brown by the time the bird is three months old.

The orange-bellied parrot most commonly utters a single-note buzzing sound that is repeated every one to three seconds as a contact call. This is generally made by orange-bellied parrots while flying, but also by birds seeing others in flight. The alarm call is a quickly repeated tzeet that has a buzzing quality. Individuals may make this call when flushed from cover. The gurgle-buzz call is made by birds acting as sentries at feeding areas, and is a mixture of an alarm call interspersed with chattering and hissing. When feeding, orange-bellied parrots may make soft low-pitched chitting sounds.

The blue-winged and elegant parrots can be mistaken for the orange-bellied parrot; however, their tinkling alarm calls and lighter olive-green upperparts distinguish them. Their blue frontal bands have only light blue border on one side. Blue-winged and female elegant parrots have yellow plumage behind and above the eye.

== Distribution and habitat ==
One of three migratory parrot species, (Note: The other two species are the blue-winged and swift parrots.) the orange-bellied parrot breeds solely in South West Tasmania, it nests in eucalypts bordering on button grass moors, generally within 30 km of the coast. The entire population migrates over Bass Strait to spend the winter on the coast of south-eastern Australia. On the way, they may stop (and occasionally overwinter on) King Island, particularly Lake Flannigan. The few mainland sites are estuaries and lagoons that contain their favoured salt marsh habitat and are generally within 3 km of the coast. These include sites in or close to Port Phillip such as Werribee Sewage Farm, the Spit Nature Conservation Reserve, the shores of Swan Bay, Swan Island, Lake Connewarre State Wildlife Reserve, Lake Victoria and Mud Islands, as well as French Island in Western Port.

In late 2017, there was a possible sighting at Canunda National Park in South Australia; the most recent confirmed sighting in the state being five years beforehand at Port MacDonnell. In July 2021, two individuals were recorded at Arthur River in northwestern Tasmania; it is unclear whether they had returned early from the mainland or did not migrate across the Bass Strait at all. They are commonly found in southern Australia.

== Behaviour ==
=== Breeding ===
In the wild, the orange-bellied parrot tends to be monogamous, though a bird will seek a new mate if its old one has died. However, males can mate with multiple females in captivity. Pairs can form on the mainland before migration or after arrival in Tasmania. The orange-bellied parrot is capable of breeding in its first year of life. The oldest known individual in the wild is known as blue/black F. At over nine years old, it is thought to have made 20 trips across Bass Strait.

Breeding is restricted to southwestern Tasmania, generally within 20 km (12 mi) of Melaleuca. The breeding season is November to February, with birds arriving at Melaleuca in early October, after which time they begin looking for suitable sites for nesting. They nest in hollows in mature trees—usually Smithton peppermint (Eucalyptus nitida) or sometimes swamp gum (E. ovata). The entrance is a 6–10 cm (2 1/2–4 in) wide hole in a broken branch or trunk, the hollow itself being up to 60 cm (24 in) deep. Since 1991, nest boxes have been built to increase the number of suitable nest sites. The female cleans out the hollow and lays the almost round white eggs on a layer of rotten wood. The clutch consists of 3 to 6 (average 4.5) eggs measuring 21.6 mm × 18.1 mm, with the eggs being laid at two day intervals. A pair will re-use a successful nesting site, with some sites used for up to six years. The female commonly remains in the nest for several days before laying.

The female incubates the eggs for 21–24 days. During this time, the male forages up to 3 km (1.9 mi) from the site. The eggs hatch 1–2 days apart, and the young are nidicolous and semi-altricial—that is, they are born helpless and blind and remain in the nest for an extended period. They are initially covered in off-white down. The female remains on the nest for another 10 days, still fed by the male, after which time they both feed the young. By two weeks of age, larger nestlings come to the mouth of the hollow to be fed. The young fledge at 4–5 weeks old.

=== Feeding ===
The orange-bellied parrot is found in pairs or small flocks, and generally remain on the ground or in low foliage searching for food. They alternate between feeding and resting quietly, beginning just before or after dawn and resting mid-morning. In the breeding season, males feed and forage constantly to supply their mates with food while incubating, and both parents do so to feed their young. Early in the breeding season, they prefer areas that were burnt 7 to 15 years previously, while by mid-breeding season, they seek out areas that are 3 to 5 years post fire. Their most important food plants are beaded glasswort (Salicornia quinqueflora) and shrubby glasswort (Tecticornia arbuscula). Other foods include the seeds of the coast fescue (Poa triodioides, syn. Austrofestuca littoralis), saltbush (Atriplex cinerea), Austral seablite (Suaeda australis) and sea heath (Frankenia pauciflora), as well as berries, such as those of Coprosma. They have also been reported eating kelp. The orange-bellied parrot generally roosts at night in trees or tall shrubs within 1 km (0.6 mi) of feeding locations.

== Conservation ==
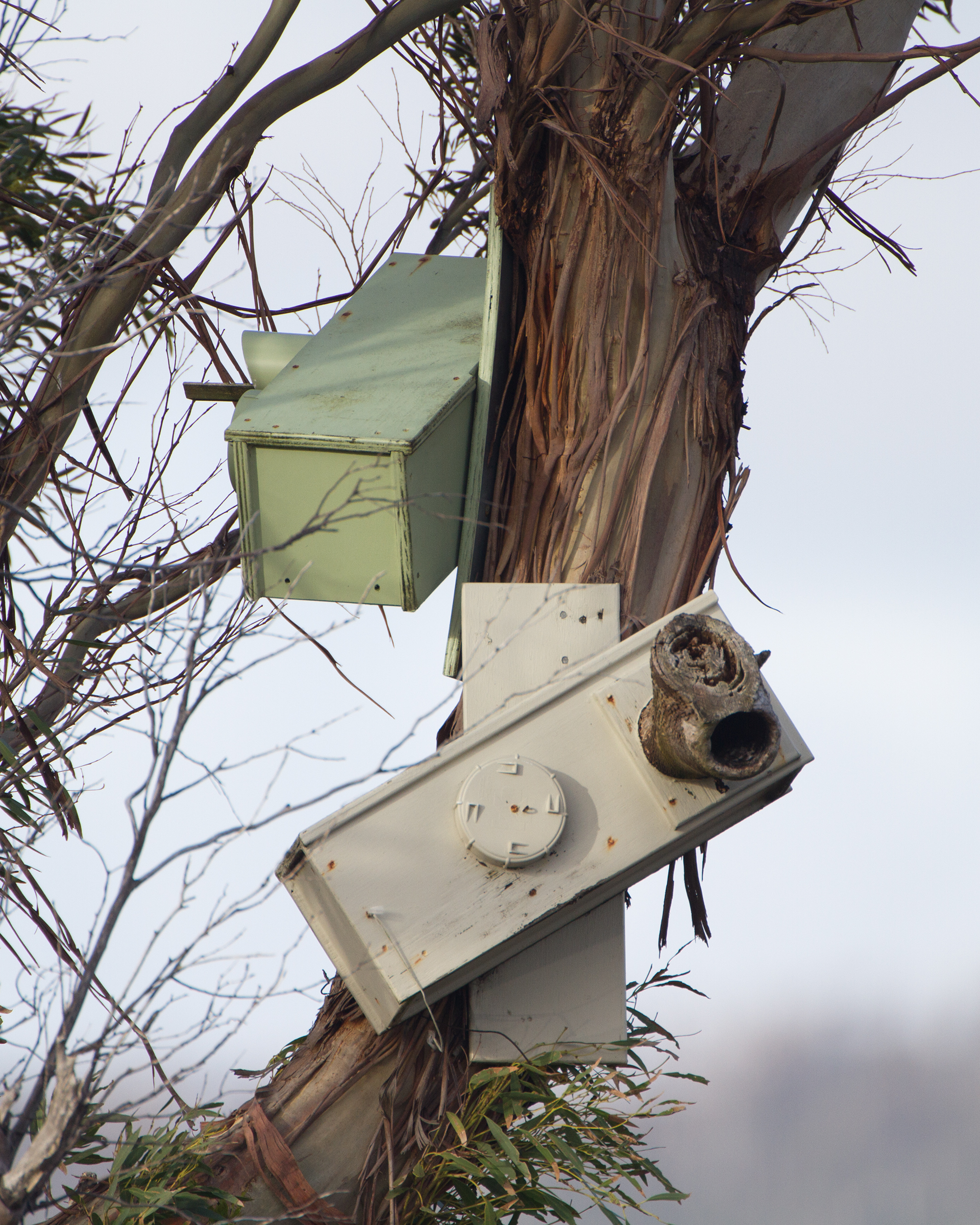
Nesting boxes intended for use by orange-bellied parrots in Melaleuca, South West Tasmania

The orange-bellied parrot was once much more widespread; it was found along the mainland coastline from Sydney to Adelaide outside the breeding season. Its range has shrunk with the loss and degradation of habitat. Around 1889, it had been recorded in various places around Sydney, including Malabar, Penshurst, Bankstown, Blacktown and Middle Head. A 1907 report of two birds caught in Riverstone might have been aviary escapees. In Victoria, it was a regular visitor to Port Fairy until 1967. In South Australia, it was reported as common in the Yorke Peninsula in the 1880s, and a rare visitor to the Fleurieu Peninsula before the 1940s.

A 2018 study ranked the bird second as the Australian bird most likely to go extinct.

As of 2021, the orange-bellied parrot is rated as critically endangered on the International Union for Conservation of Nature (IUCN)'s Red List of Endangered species. The 2016–17 breeding season saw the wild population drop to 16 confirmed individuals—13 males and 3 females. The 2019–2020 breeding season saw the wild population had recover to 118 individuals by April. By December 2021, 70 birds had returned to breed for the 2021–22 season, building on the previous year's total of 51 individuals.

By 2007, its status had been upgraded from endangered to critically endangered on the Commonwealth Environment Protection and Biodiversity Conservation Act 1999.

- The 2000 Action Plan for Australian Birds lists it as critically endangered (Garnett and Crowley 2000).
- In a report on threatened and extinct birds in Australia in 1992, it was listed as endangered (Garnett 1992).
- In a report on threatened birds in Australia in 1990, it was listed as endangered (Brouwer and Garnett 1990).

The orange-bellied parrot has been recorded from four states within Australia: Tasmania, Victoria, New South Wales and South Australia. Its conservation status varies from state to state within Australia. For example:

- The orange-bellied parrot is listed as threatened on the Victorian Flora and Fauna Guarantee Act (1988). Under this Act, an Action Statement for the recovery and future management of this species has been prepared.
- On the 2007 advisory list of threatened vertebrate fauna in Victoria, the orange-bellied parrot is listed as critically endangered.

=== Recovery program ===
In early 2011, 21 new 'founders' were collected from the wild to improve the captive flock's genetic diversity. These birds were shared among the three core institutions with previous orange-bellied parrot breeding experience (Taroona, Healesville Sanctuary and Adelaide Zoo) and were paired with existing captive birds to begin spreading new genes through the captive population.

In May 2011, media attention focussed on the 10 individuals transferred by aircraft from Tasmania to Healesville Sanctuary near Melbourne, which was described as a last-ditch effort to save the species from extinction. It is hoped that the new additions from the wild will improve the genetic diversity of the 80 birds at Healesville Sanctuary, which are all descended from three pairs. Captive populations in Hobart and Adelaide are also important to the aim of releasing captive bred birds back to the wild.

In July 2012, it was announced that 19 of 21 pairs with founders had produced eggs and that across all three institutions, 31 fledglings had been produced from these new pairs.

Captive breeding was expanded at the end of 2011 when Priam Australia Pty Ltd., a commercial parrot breeding centre in New South Wales, received five pairs of orange-bellied parrots.

In August 2012, a private zoo, Moonlit Sanctuary in Pearcedale, Victoria, received seven birds for display and possible breeding. The same month, another private zoo, Halls Gap Zoo in western Victoria, received five pairs of birds for breeding. In 2016 Moonlit Sanctuary opened a dedicated facility for 20 pairs, while Halls Gap had withdrawn from the program in the previous year. With three larger breeding facilities and two smaller groups of birds involved in the captive breeding program, it is hoped the captive population will increase quickly.

Carolyn Hogg and colleagues suggested that the low genetic diversity could be boosted by select breeding with a close relative. Of its three closest relatives, the blue-winged parrot is most similar in behaviour and habitat preferences, and hence is recommended for a captive trial of interspecific hybridization to improve genetic diversity.

=== Vaccination against H5 bird flu ===
In September 2026, the Tasmanian government announced a H5N1 avian influenza vaccination program among the captive population. Up to 350 captive birds are expected to be vaccinated, including young birds which were bred at Five Mile Beach Wildlife Management Facility and are expected to be released into the wild.

== Threats ==
The 2000 Action Plan for Australian Birds identifies the following potential threats to the orange-bellied parrot:

- Fragmentation and degradation of overwintering habitat
- Competition with introduced seed-eaters
- Abandonment of former breeding habitat due to altered fire regime and competition for hollows (with the introduced common starling)
- Random events due to the small size of the population
- Disorientation from brightly lit fishing boats (during the migrations across Bass Strait)
- Introduced predators
- Disease (such as psittacine circoviral disease)

Other identified potential threats include:

- Lack of safety in numbers for a small bird attractive to avian predators (Brouwer and Garnett 1990)
- Historically was trapped for aviculture (Garnett 1992)
- A stomach virus is threatening a breeding program for the critically endangered orange-bellied parrot.

In 2013, the Orange-bellied Parrot Recovery Team's Annual Report for 2012/13 (published October 2013) outlined the reasons for its decline and the threats to the orange-bellied parrot as follows:

...Current knowledge suggests that habitat loss and degradation, particularly in the non-breeding range, has caused the decline. Low breeding participation by females has been implicated in recent declines (2000–2010). The species is also at risk from climate change, and the small population size places the species at increased risk from factors such as loss of genetic diversity and inbreeding, stochastic environmental events, predators and competitors, disease, and barriers to migration and movement.

== Impact on industrial development ==
The orange-bellied parrot earned the wrath of Victorian premier Jeff Kennett in the 1990s. A proposed relocation of the Coode Island chemical storage facility to a location near Point Wilson, Victoria was jeopardised by the potential impacts upon orange-bellied parrot habitat. Mr Kennett described this species as a 'trumped-up corella'.

Orange-bellied parrots were considered in the impact assessment for the Woolnorth windfarm on Tasmania's north-west coast. The planning proposal was thoroughly assessed by both State and Commonwealth regulators (having been determined to be a controlled action under the EPBC Act).

Surveys and collision risk modeling were undertaken as well as a population viability analysis to assess the impact on the species. The wind-farm is not in the flight path of OBPs, but they do pass near by. In 2001, then Australian federal environment minister Robert Hill approved the wind-farm.

To date no orange-bellied parrots have been found to collide with the turbines. Monitoring continues today as well as measures to reduce OBPs coming near the wind-farm.

In 2006, the potential threats to the orange-bellied parrot were cited as the key reason for the Commonwealth Minister rejecting the proposal to build the Bald Hills Wind Farm in eastern Victoria. It was found there were no significant risks to the species, and the decision was reversed. The company was provided with approval to proceed (under certain conditions). The intense media scrutiny at this time placed the orange-bellied parrot temporarily into the spotlight. In the subsequent months additional funding was provided for the parrot's recovery, and its status under the Commonwealth Environment Protection and Biodiversity Conservation Act 1999 was raised from endangered to critically endangered.

== Aviculture ==
The orange-bellied parrot was first bred successfully in 1973 by South Australian aviculturist Fred Lewitska, after five years with no success. He repeated his success in 1974 before being directed to release the birds into the wild by authorities. He found that the species could be inactive in an aviary and was prone to obesity, like the related rock parrot. Victorian birdwatcher, artist and photographer Len Robinson bred orange-bellied parrots in suburban Melbourne between 1998 and 2006. He held four pairs for eight breeding seasons, fledging a total of 47.
