= List of places on the Victorian Heritage Register in Unincorporated areas =

This is a list of places on the Victorian Heritage Register in the Unincorporated areas in Victoria, Australia. The Victorian Heritage Register is maintained by the Heritage Council of Victoria.

The Victorian Heritage Register, as of 2021, lists the following five state-registered places within the Unincorporated areas:

Place name	Place #	Location	Suburb or Town	Co-ordinates	Built	State registered	Photo
Gabo Island Lightstation	H1843	Gabo Island		37.568612°S 149.916902°E	1859	18 November 1999	
South Channel Fort	H1502	Port Phillip Bay		38.306472°S 144.801806°E	1879	10 February 1988	
South Channel Pile Light	H1519	Port Phillip Bay		38.338611°S 144.818333°E	1874	20 August 1982	
Spargos Hut	H1609	Huts Walk	Hotham Heights	36.981915°S 147.162967°E	1928	1 November 1989	
West Channel Pile Light	H1518	Port Phillip Bay		38.192889°S 144.756583°E	1881	20 August 1982	
