= Port Phillip =

Bay in Victoria, Australia

- Port Phillip Bay
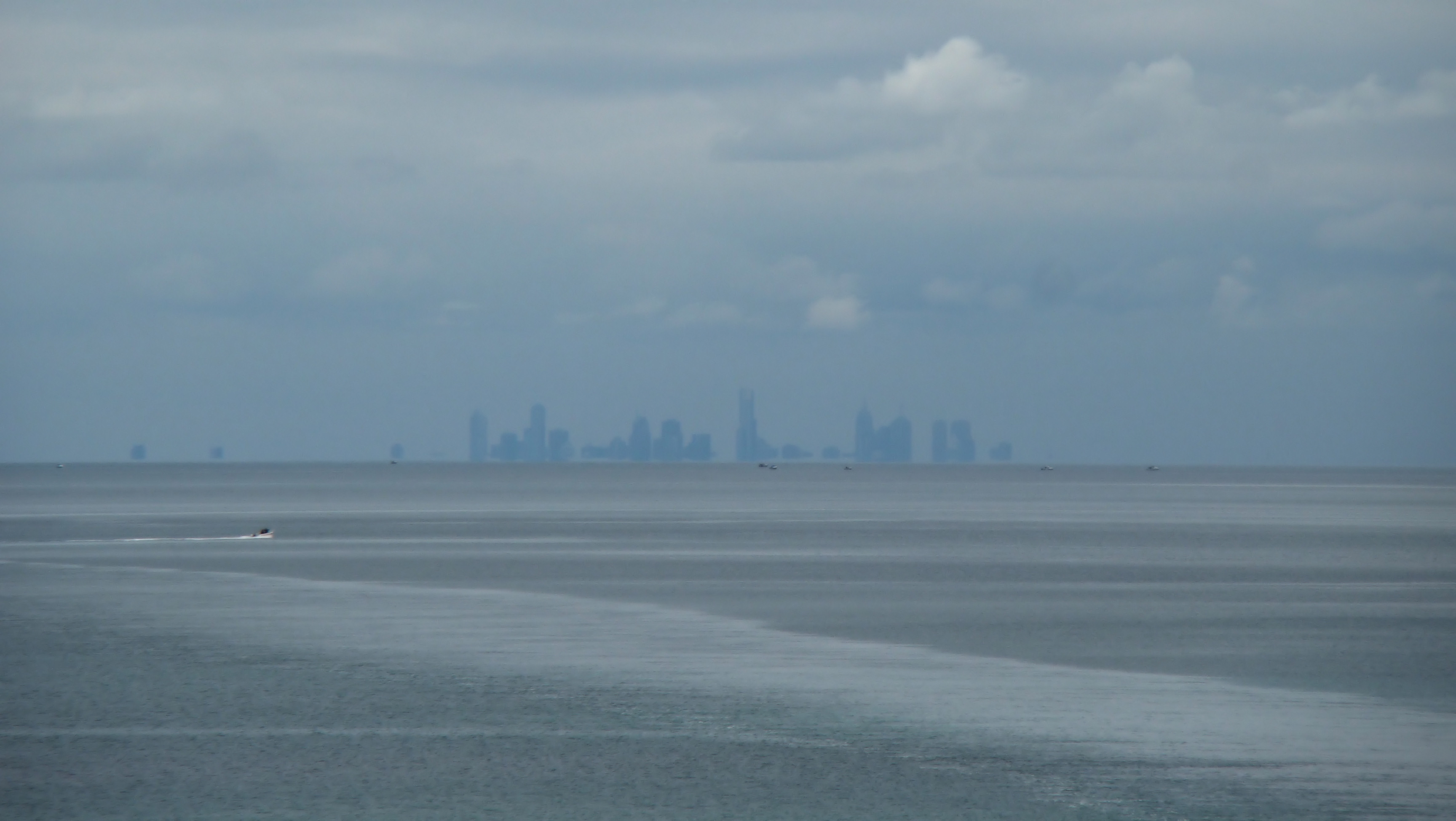
- The Melbourne skyline, seen across Port Phillip

- Location within Victoria

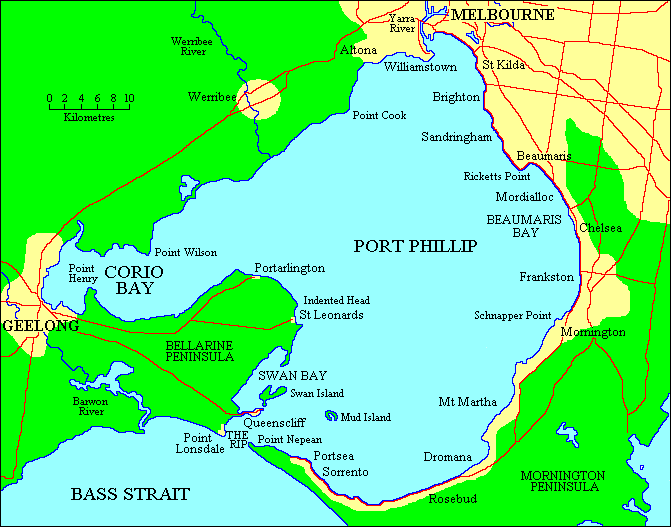
- Map of the Port Phillip area
- Coordinates: 38°09′S 144°52′E
- Type: Saline, Permanent, Natural
- Primary inflows: Yarra River, Patterson River, Werribee River, Little River, Kororoit Creek
- Primary outflows: Bass Strait
- Basin countries: Australia
- Surface area: 1,930 km^{2} (750 sq mi)
- Average depth: 8 m (26 ft)
- Max. depth: 24 m (79 ft)
- Water volume: 25 km^{3} (6.0 cu mi)
- Shore length^{1}: 264 km (164 mi)
- Surface elevation: 0 m (0 ft)
- Islands: Swan Island, Duck Island, Mud Islands
- Settlements: Melbourne, Geelong, Frankston, Mornington, Queenscliff, Sorrento
- ^{1} Shore length is not a well-defined measure.

Port Phillip (Kulin: Narm-Narm Naarm Woiwurrung Boonwurrung) or Port Phillip Bay is a horsehead-shaped enclosed bay on the central coast of southern Victoria, Australia. The bay opens into the Bass Strait via a short, narrow channel known as The Rip, and is completely surrounded by localities of Victoria's two largest cities — metropolitan Greater Melbourne in the bay's main eastern portion north of the Mornington Peninsula, and the city of Greater Geelong in the much smaller western portion (known as the Corio Bay) north of the Bellarine Peninsula. Geographically, the bay covers 1,930 km^{2} (750 mi^{2}) and the shore stretches roughly 264 km (164 mi), with the volume of water around 25 km^{3} (6.0 cu mi). Most of the bay is navigable, although it is extremely shallow for its size — the deepest portion is only 24 m (79 ft) and half the bay is shallower than 8 m (26 ft). Its waters and coast are home to seals, whales, dolphins, corals and many kinds of seabirds and migratory waders.

Before European settlement, the area around Port Phillip was divided between the territories of the Wathaurong (west), Wurundjeri (north) and Boonwurrung (south and east) people, all part of the indigenous Kulin nation. The first Europeans to enter the bay were the crews of HMS Lady Nelson, commanded by John Murray and, ten weeks later, HMS Investigator commanded by Matthew Flinders, in 1802. Subsequent expeditions into the bay took place in 1803 to establish the first settlement in Victoria, near Sorrento, but was abandoned in 1804. Thirty years later, settlers from Tasmania returned to establish Melbourne (now Victoria's capital city) at the mouth of the Yarra River in 1835, and Geelong at Corio Bay in 1838. Today, Port Phillip is the most densely populated catchment in Australia with an estimated 5.5 million people living around the bay; Melbourne's suburbs extend around much of the northern and eastern shorelines, and the city of Geelong sprawls around Corio Bay in the bay's western arm.

== History ==
=== Prehistory ===
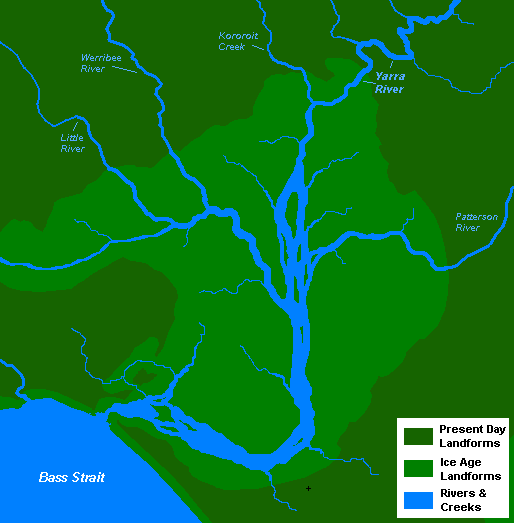
The course of the lower Yarra River around 10,000 years ago, after the end of the last Ice Age, prior to the creation of Port Phillip.

Port Phillip formed between the end of the last Ice Age around 8000 BCE and around 6000 BCE, when the sea-level rose to drown the vast river plains, wetlands and lakes at what was then the lower reaches of the Yarra River. The ancient Yarra and its tributaries (the other present-day rivers of the Port Phillip catchment) flowed down what is now the middle of the bay, formed a coastal lake in the southern reaches of the bay dammed by The Heads, and subsequently pouring out into a closed bay that formed over the western portion of the prehistoric Bassian Plain, which was later completely flooded and became Bass Strait.

The Aboriginal people inhabited the area long before the bay was formed, with evidence of occupation dating at least 40,000 years ago. Settler records indicate an oral history with at least 18,000 years of linearity when Boonwurrung Elder Ningerranarro spoke of his ancestors hunting kangaroo and possum where the Bay now lies. Large piles of semi-fossilised seashells known as middens can still be seen in places around the shoreline, marking the spots where Aboriginal people held feasts. They made a good living from the abundant sea-life, which included penguins and seals. In the cold season, they wore possum-skin cloaks and intricate feathered head-dresses.

A dry period combined with sand bar formation, may have dried the bay out as recently as between 800 BCE and 1000 CE.

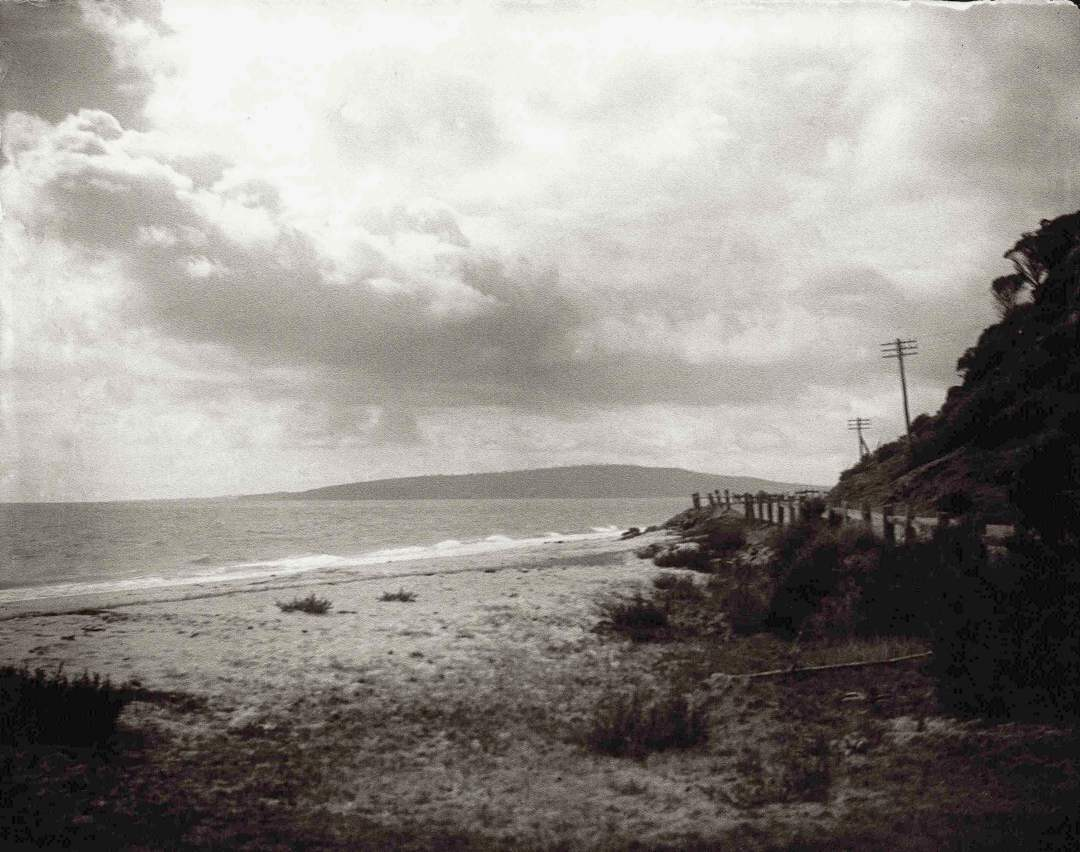
Anthony's Nose, Dromana, 1920

Seismicity has been observed around the bay continually since the 1800s with earlier earthquakes recorded in local newspaper reports. An earthquake that occurred in July 1885 was described in a newspaper.

"The earth-quake appears to have been confined to the southern portion of the colony, and principally to those places bordering on Bass's Straits and Port Phillip Bay. Telegrams to the Argus from Cowes, Flinders, Kangaroo Grounds, Mornington, Queenscliff, Eltham, Lilydale, Shoreham, and Cape Schanck, all mention the earthquake."

Anthonys Nose is an escarpment landform of Devonian granite on the Mornington Peninsula that is located where Arthurs Seat ends as the mountain falls steeply towards Port Phillip and is part of the Selwyn Fault.

=== European exploration ===
In 1800, Lieutenant James Grant was the first known European to pass through Bass Strait from west to east in HMS Lady Nelson. He was also the first to see, and crudely chart, the south coast from Cape Banks in South Australia to Wilsons Promontory in Victoria. Grant gave the name "Governor King's Bay" to the body of water between Cape Otway and Wilsons Promontory, but did not venture in and discover Port Phillip.

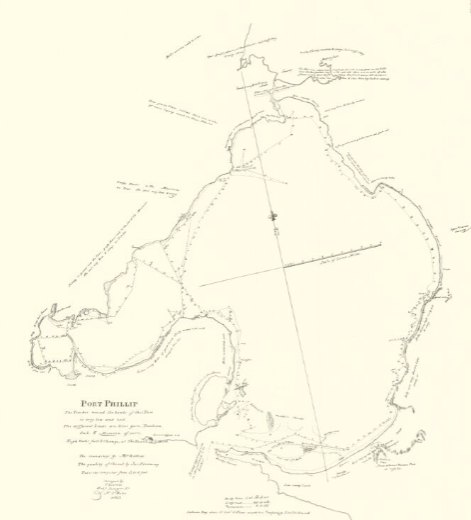
1803 map by Charles Grimes of Port Phillip

The first Europeans to find and enter Port Phillip, were the crew of the Lady Nelson, commanded by John Murray, which entered the bay on 15 February 1802. The bay was then known as Narm-Narm by the people of the Kulin tribe, and Murray called the bay Port King after the Governor of New South Wales, Philip Gidley King. On 4 September 1805, King formally renamed it Port Phillip, in honour of his predecessor Arthur Phillip. Murray chose to base the Lady Nelson off what is now known as Sorrento Beach.

During this voyage, Murray records in his journal his first encounter with local Aboriginal peoples. This initially friendly encounter started with trading, eating, and gifting, and was suddenly interrupted by a violent ambush by a large group of Aboriginal people.

"They were all clothed in opossum skins and in each basket a certain quantity of gum was found. ... if we may judge from the number of their fires and other marks this part of the country is not thin of inhabitants. Their spears are of various kinds and all of them more dangerous than any I have yet seen."

The crew in response shot at the Aboriginal people, and continued to shoot at them as they fled, inflicting likely mortal wounds on two of the Aboriginal people. Watching from the boat, Murray ordered grapeshot and round shot to be fired from the carronades aboard the ship at the fleeing Aboriginal people. Murray said

"Thus did this treachery and unprovoked attack meet with its just punishment and at the same time taught us a useful lesson to be more cautious in future."

After exploring the southern part of the bay, Murray formally took possession of the area on 8 March 1802 for King George III of Great Britain in a small ceremony at a place now known as the Point King Foreshore Reserve in Sorrento. A few days later Murray sailed out of the heads and returned to Sydney.

About ten weeks after Murray, Matthew Flinders in HMS Investigator also found and entered the bay, unaware Murray had been there. The official history of Nicholas Baudin's explorations in Le Géographe claimed they too had sighted the entrance at that time (30 March 1802) but this is almost certainly a later embellishment or error, being absent from the ship's logs and Baudin's own accounts. As a result of Murray's and Flinders' reports, King sent Lieutenant Charles Robbins in HMS Cumberland to explore Port Phillip fully. This surveying party, which included Charles Grimes, produced a mostly complete chart of Port Phillip including the mouth of the Yarra River, which they visited on 2 February 1803. Robbins found Aboriginal habitations and groups of Aboriginal people at Tootgarook, Carrum Carrum, on the banks of the Yarra and at Geelong.

=== British settlement ===
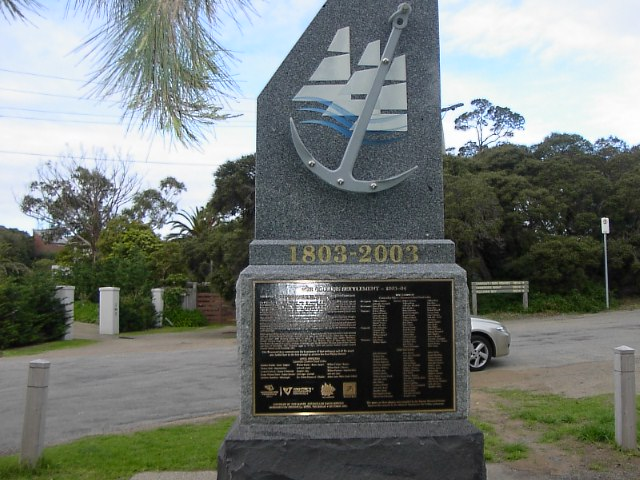
The memorial at Sorrento marking the site of the first British settlement on Port Phillip in 1803

King decided to place a convict settlement at Port Phillip, mainly to stake a claim to southern Australia ahead of the French. On 10 October 1803 a convoy of two ships HMS Calcutta and Ocean led by Captain David Collins carrying 402 people (5 Government officials, 9 officers of marines, 2 drummers, and 39 privates, 5 soldiers' wives and a child, and 307 convicts with 17 convicts' wives and 7 children) entered Port Phillip. After some investigation it was decided to establish the settlement at a spot known as Sullivan Bay, very close to where Sorrento now exists. The expedition landed at Sullivan Bay on 17 October 1803, and the first of the "orders" issued by Collins bears that date. On 25 October, the King's birthday, the British flag was hoisted over the tiny settlement and a little salvo of musketry celebrated the royal occasion.

On 25 November the first white child was born in Victoria and was baptised on Christmas Day, receiving the name of William James Hobart Thorne. The first marriage took place on 28 November, when a free woman, Hannah Harvey was wedded to convict Richard Garrett. Small exploratory groups from this settlement surveyed a land route to Western Port and also sailed to the northwest shore of Port Phillip. On this latter journey, a large group of about 200 Aboriginal people came to meet the Britishers with "hostile intentions", and "with the application of fire-arms absolutely necessary to repel them", several Aboriginal people were shot. Lack of fresh water and good timber led this first British attempt at settlement in the region later known as Victoria to be abandoned on 27 January 1804. When Collins left Port Phillip, the Calcutta proceeded to Sydney, and the Ocean to Risdon Cove in Tasmania, where they arrived on 15 February 1804. Prior to abandonment, a group of convicts including William Buckley, escaped from the settlement. Buckley took up residence in a cave near Point Lonsdale on the western side of the bay's entrance, The Rip, and later lived with an Aboriginal Australian group for many years, being given up for dead.

Port Phillip was then left mostly undisturbed until 1835, when settlers from Tasmania led by John Batman and John Pascoe Fawkner (who had been at the Sorrento settlement as a child) established Melbourne on the lower reaches of the Yarra. John Batman encountered William Buckley who then became an important translator in negotiations with the local Aboriginal tribesmen. In 1838 Geelong was founded, and became the main port serving the growing wool industry of the Western District. For a time Geelong rivalled Melbourne as the leading settlement on the bay, but the Gold Rush which began in 1851 gave Melbourne a decisive edge as the largest town in Victoria.

=== Growth and development of Melbourne ===
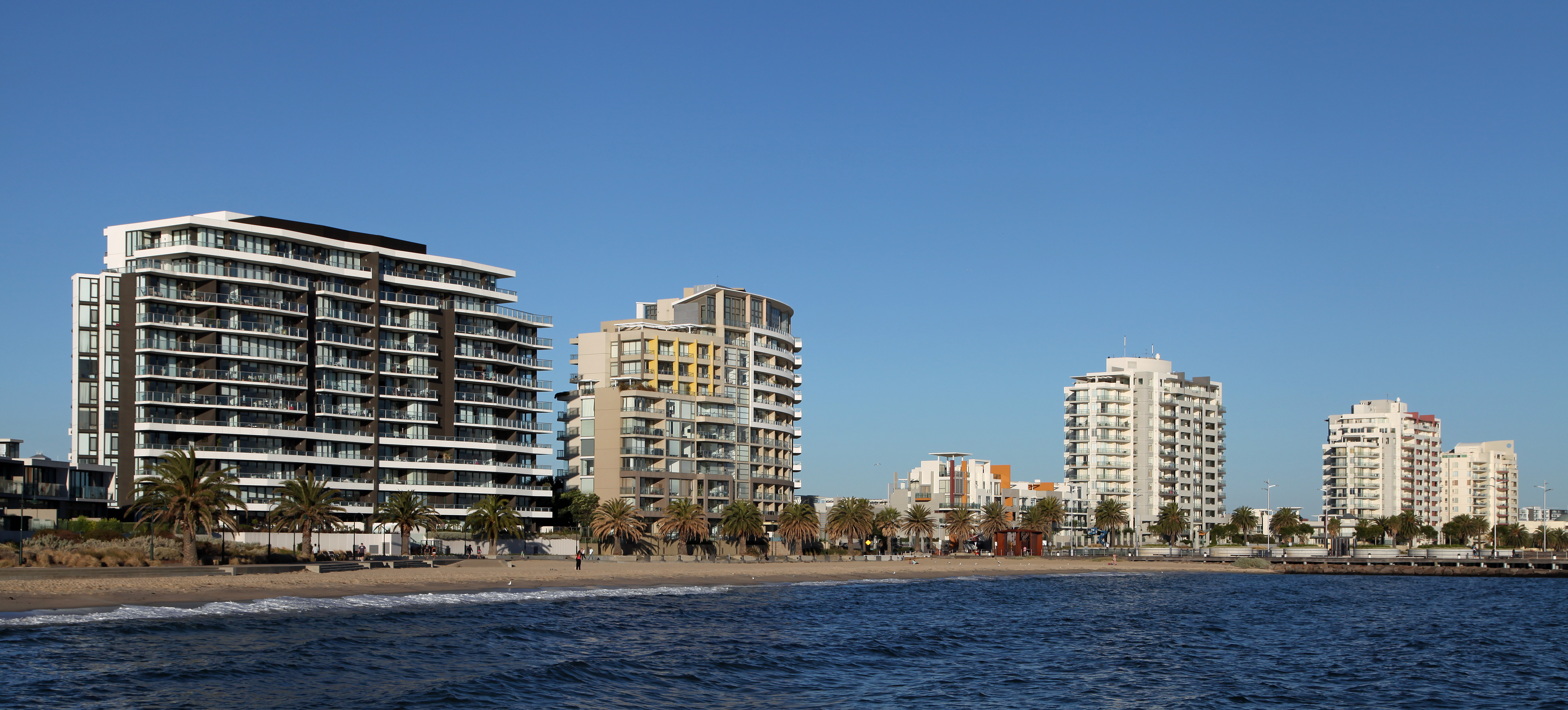
Beacon Cove beach and apartments in Port Melbourne

As Melbourne prospered, its wealthy classes discovered the recreational uses of Port Phillip. Bayside suburbs such as St Kilda and Brighton were established on the east shore of the bay. Later, resorts further south such as Sorrento and Portsea became popular. The more swampy western shores of the bay were not so favoured, and have been used mainly for non-residential purposes such as agriculture, the Point Cook Royal Australian Air Force base and the Werribee Sewage Farm, and significant nature reserves. In recent decades the population along the western side of the bay has grown more rapidly.

In the 21st century, property along the Port Phillip coastline continues to be highly sought after. Port Phillip continues to be extensively used for recreational pursuits such as swimming, cycling, boating, and fishing. The bay also features a number of historical walks and fauna reserves. The traditional land owners of the area have also been acknowledged at a number of sites.

== Geography ==
Port Phillip lies in southern Victoria, separated from Bass Strait by the Bellarine Peninsula to the southwest and Mornington Peninsula to the southeast. It is the largest bay in Victoria and one of the largest inland bays in Australia. The narrow entrance to the bay, called the Rip, between Point Lonsdale and Point Nepean, features strong tidal streams made turbulent by the uneven contours of the seabed. The best time for small craft to enter the Rip is at slack water. Large ships require expert local guidance to enter and exit, provided by the Port Phillip maritime pilots. Work has begun to deepen the channel entrance, to allow newer, larger container ships to access Melbourne's docks.

The eastern side of the bay is characterised by sandy beaches extending from St Kilda, Sandringham, Beaumaris, Carrum, and down the Mornington Peninsula to Frankston, Safety Beach/Dromana and Rye to Portsea. Longshore drift carries sand from south to north during winter and from north to south during summer. Cliff erosion control has often resulted in sand starvation, necessitating offshore dredging to replenish the beach. On the western side of the bay there is a greater variety of beach types, including both sandy and sandstone rock beaches, seen at Queenscliff, St Leonards, Indented Head, Portarlington, Altona and Geelong's Eastern Beach. Numerous sandbanks and shoals occur in the southern section of the bay, and parts of the South Channel require occasional maintenance dredging.

=== Climate ===
The region has an oceanic climate (Köppen Cfb) with warm summers possessing occasional very hot days due to northerly winds and mild winters. Annual rainfall, which is evenly distributed over the year, shows considerable variation due to the Otway Ranges to the southwest: the northwestern shore of the bay is the driest part of southern Victoria and almost approaches a semi-arid climate (BSk) with a mean annual rainfall as low as 425 millimetres (17 in) (comparable to Nhill or Numurkah), whilst the eastern shores less shielded by the Otways receive as much as 850 millimetres (33 in). Summer temperatures average around 25 °C (77 °F) during the day and 14 °C (57 °F) at night, but occasional northerly winds can push temperatures over 40 °C (104 °F), whilst in winter a typical day will range from 6 °C (43 °F) to 14 °C (57 °F).

Port Phillip is often warmer than the surrounding oceans and/or the land mass, particularly in spring and autumn; this can set up a "bay-effect rain", similar to the "lake effect snow" seen in colder climates, where showers are intensified leeward of the bay (particularly in Melbourne's eastern suburbs).

=== Beaches ===
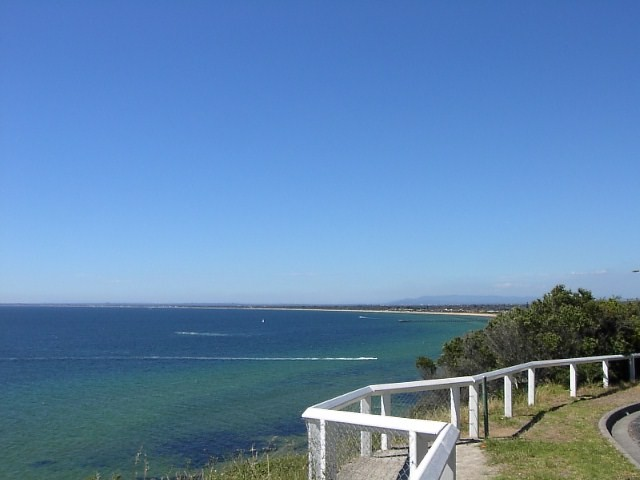
Port Phillip as seen from Frankston on the eastern shore of the bay

Port Phillip hosts many beaches, most of which are flat, shallow and long, with very small breaks making swimming quite safe. This attracts many tourists, mostly families, to the beaches of Port Phillip during the summer months and school holidays. Water sports such as body boarding and surfing are difficult or impossible, except in extreme weather conditions. However, stand up paddle boarding (SUP), kite surfing and wind surfing are very popular. Most sandy beaches are located on the bay's northern, eastern and southern shorelines, while the western shorelines host a few sandy beaches, there mostly exists a greater variety of beaches, swampy wetlands and mangroves. The occasional pebble beach and rocky cliffs can also be found, mostly in the southern reaches.

- Major beaches include: St. Kilda Beach, Brighton Beach, Sandringham Beach, Dromana Beach

=== Rivers and creeks ===
- Rivers: Yarra River, Maribyrnong River, Patterson River, Little River, Werribee River.
- Creeks: Elwood Canal, Mordialloc Creek, Kananook Creek, Sweetwater Creek, Balcombe Creek, Chinamans Creek, Cowies Creek, Hovells Creek, Kororoit Creek.

=== Islands ===
Due to its shallow depth, several artificial islands and forts have been built; however, despite the depth, it only hosts a few true islands. Many sandy, muddy banks and shallows exist in its southern reaches, such as Mud Islands, but most islands are located in the marshy shallows of Swan Bay. Some of the bay's major islands include:

- Swan Island
- Mud Islands
- Duck Island
- South Channel Fort (artificial)
- Pope's Eye (artificial)

=== Surrounding mountains and hills ===
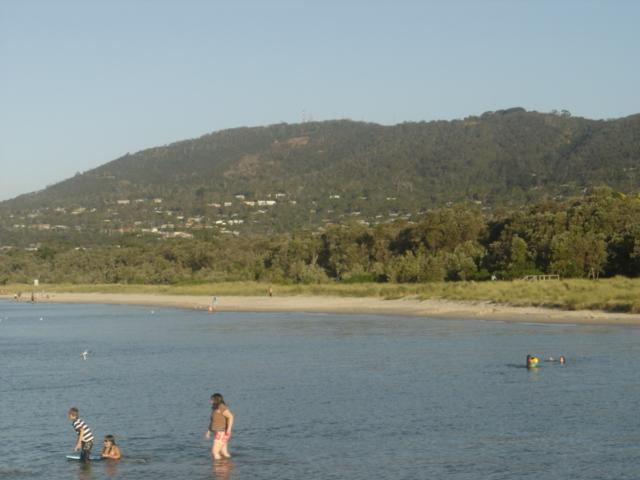
Arthurs Seat (305 m high) and Dromana Bay in southern Port Phillip

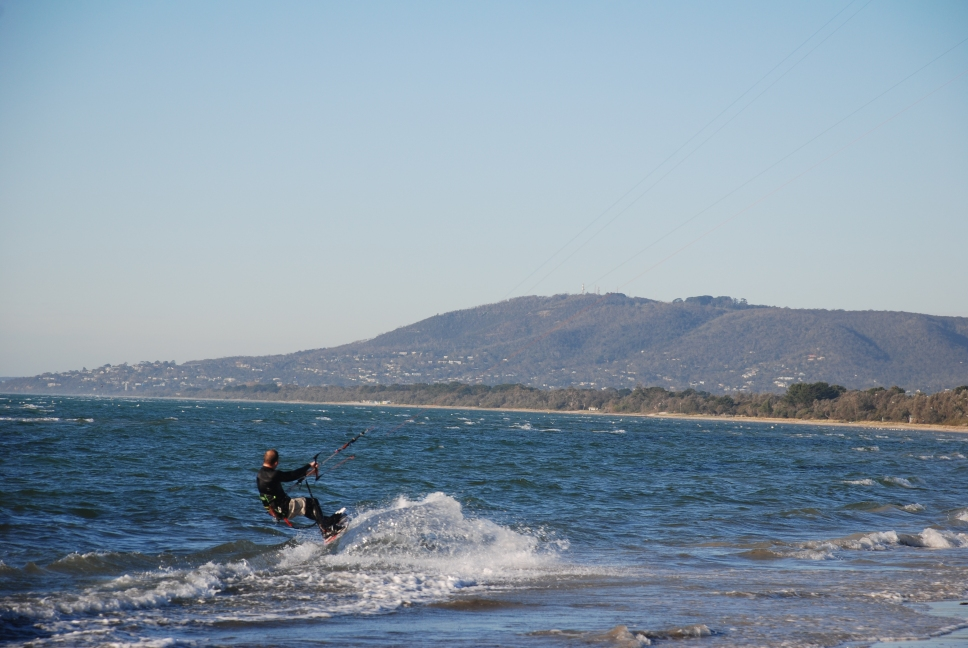
Kitesurfing at Rye with Arthurs Seat in the background

- Arthurs Seat 314 m
- Mount Martha 160 m
- Mount Eliza
- Olivers Hill
- Flinders Peak (You Yangs) 364 m

=== Surrounding lakes ===
- Albert Park Lake
- Cherry Lake
- Lake Borrie
- Lake Carramar, Lake Illawong and Lake Legana of Patterson Lakes
- Lake Connewarre
- Lake Victoria
- RAAF Lake
- Sanctuary Lakes (artificial)
- Salt Lagoon

== Ecology ==
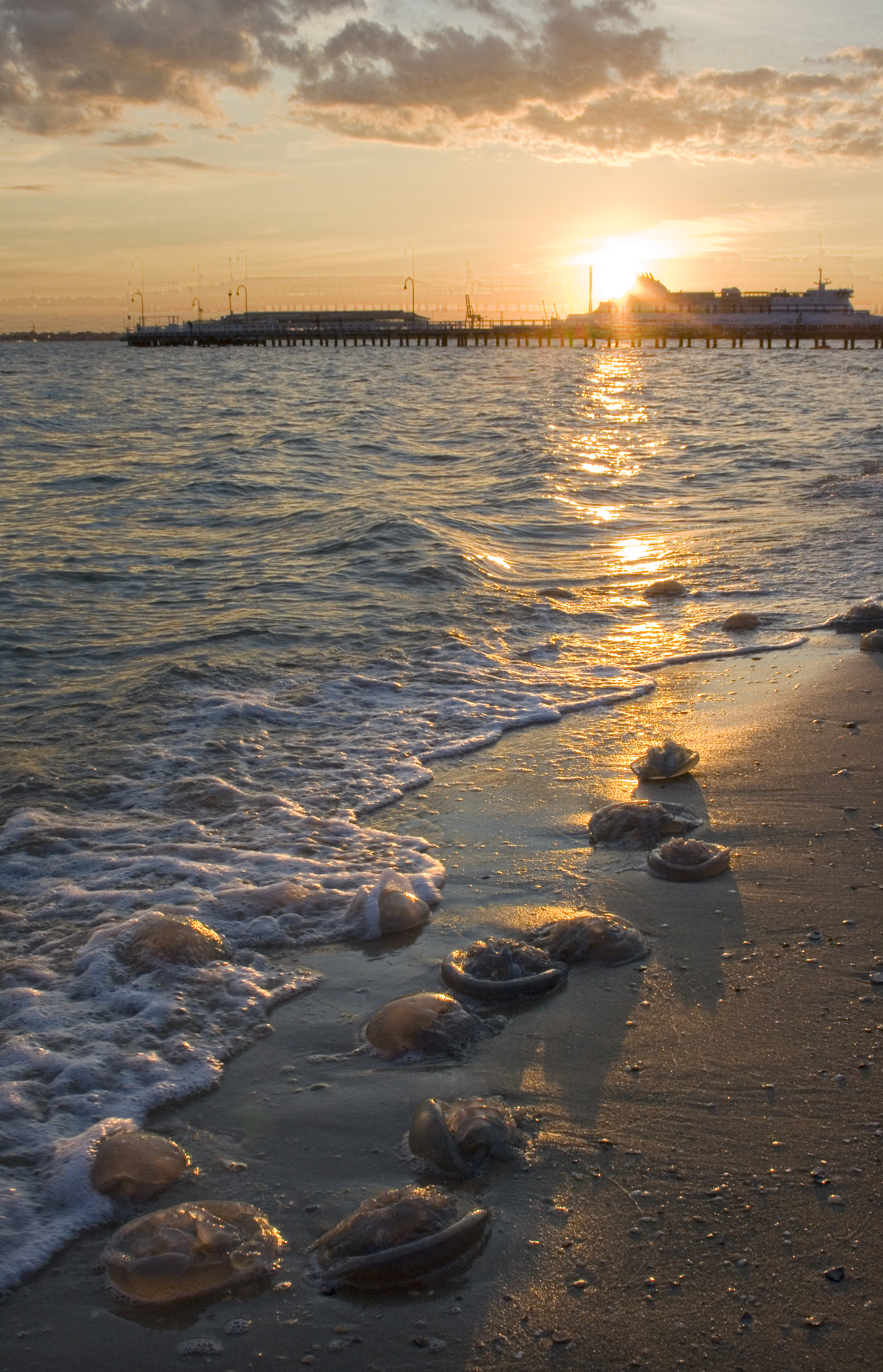
Jellyfish washed up on Port Melbourne beach

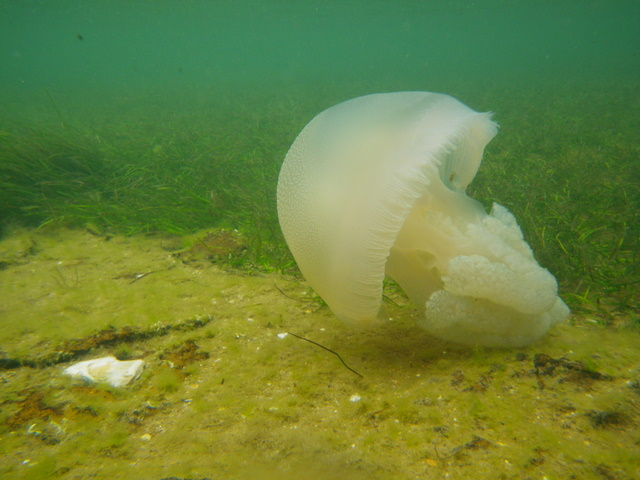
Blue blubber jellyfish in Port Phillip

Jellyfish are a familiar sight in Port Phillip, and its waters are home to species such as Australian fur seals, bottlenose dolphins, common dolphins, humpback whales, and southern right whales. Many other cetacean species may also migrate off the areas. The smooth toadfish is one of the most common fishes in muddy areas. The bay has many endemic species including the bluedevil fish and fantastic sponge walls on the Lonsdale wall in the heads of the bay. It also hosts breeding colonies of Australian fur seals. Occasionally, Australian sea lions, New Zealand fur seals, subantarctic fur seals, and leopard seals may come into the bay as well. Certain individual southern elephant seals may frequent the bay as well.

Swan Bay, adjacent to Queenscliff, is an important feeding ground for waterbirds and migratory waders. The Mud Islands, off Sorrento, are an important breeding habitat for white-faced storm petrels, silver gulls, Australian pelicans and Pacific gulls. Salt marshes in the northwestern sections of the bay, such as that in the Werribee Sewage Farm and the adjacent Spit Nature Conservation Reserve, are within the Port Phillip Bay (Western Shoreline) and Bellarine Peninsula Ramsar Site, listed as wetlands of international importance under the Ramsar Convention, and the critically endangered orange-bellied parrot is found at three wintering sites with saltmarsh habitat around Port Phillip and the Bellarine Peninsula. A variety of seabirds, such as Australasian gannets, nest on artificial structures in the bay.

Port Phillip contains 3 Marine Sanctuaries managed by Parks Victoria to protect and conserve the bay's biodiversity, ecological processes and the natural and heritage features.

Port Phillip's marine water quality is monitored by the Environment Protection Authority of Victoria and was fluctuating between Good to Very Good across the bay in 2021-2022.

=== Original flora and fauna ===
In 1906, George Gordon McCrae wrote two letters to a local schoolmaster at Dromana, Mr G.H. Rogers. His subject was his earliest recollections of an idyllic boyhood spent at Arthur's Seat Run, location of the historic McCrae Homestead on the southern shore of the bay, part of the Mornington Peninsula. In the letters he described in detail the natural history of the area in the 1840s, and the species he particularly remembered 60 years later. In 1939, Charles Daley read an article before the Royal Historical Society of Victoria based on these letters, which was published in its journal in 1940 the year after a large bushfire in January 1939 hastened the disappearance of much of the original surviving wildlife from the area. The names of the species reflect the titles given to them by the original European settlers of the bay.

The animals he observed as a young boy were "immense droves of kangaroos, brush kangaroos or wallaby, paddy-melon, bandicoots (two varieties), great opossum (two varieties), ring tail, flying squirrel, flying mouse, dingoes or wild dogs in the gullies, that were caught in box traps with sliding doors, porcupine ant eater or echidna that were at the back of Arthur's Seat mountain, the great iguana, tree lizard- 5 feet, python, and the rock or sleeping lizard."

The trees were coast banksia, honey suckle, and grass trees "with crowns for thatching". The gum of Xanthorrhoea australis was used for carriage varnish.

In the waters of the bay he described "scallop shells which were used as an oil lamp with a bulrush wick, banks of cockles covered with birds, grey and white gulls, a 13-16 lb size schnapper ground off Mt Martha Point, mutton fish or venus ear- bait, coatfish, parrot fish, leather jackets, flathead, dog fish, sting rays, shark tailed rays, and pig fish that he thought to be "very old".

On the beaches could be sighted pelicans, penguins, grey and grey white gull, called "bungan" by aborigines (the Bunurong Mayone-bulluk clan), small white and lavender gull, pied oyster catchers, terns, cormorants, the little sandpiper, and musk ducks.

In the swamps (which have since been filled in) were "The Nankeen bird with one long white feather behind the ear, The rail, The bittern, The snipe and jack snipe, Several ducks- wood duck, black duck, Teal, Spoonbill, Black swan Geese, Cranes, Blue and white coots, Water hens, Kingfishers here and there and swamp or ground parrot with the barred tail feathers."

In the scrub by the waterholes were "honey eaters, warblers, red coat robins, emu wren with 2 long feathers in tail, Laughing jack ass- everywhere, butcher bird, also known as shrike or whistling jackass, Quail where coverage good in bottom of scrub, turkey at Boneo and the big swamp off the property."

On the flats were found spur wing plovers, minas, and leatherheads.

In timbers near the flats were "many varieties of parrots, Lorry, Rosella, Blue mountain or honeysuckle parrot, Sulphur –crested white cockatoo, Black cockatoo of two kinds, Grey cockatoo with scarlet crest and Corella or cockatoo parrot."

Among the cherry trees in the garden at the homestead were "bronzewing pigeon and satin birds, love birds and honeyeating parakeets."

Birds of prey were "eagle hawks, falcons, and owls, some white and of great size".

==== Cetaceans ====
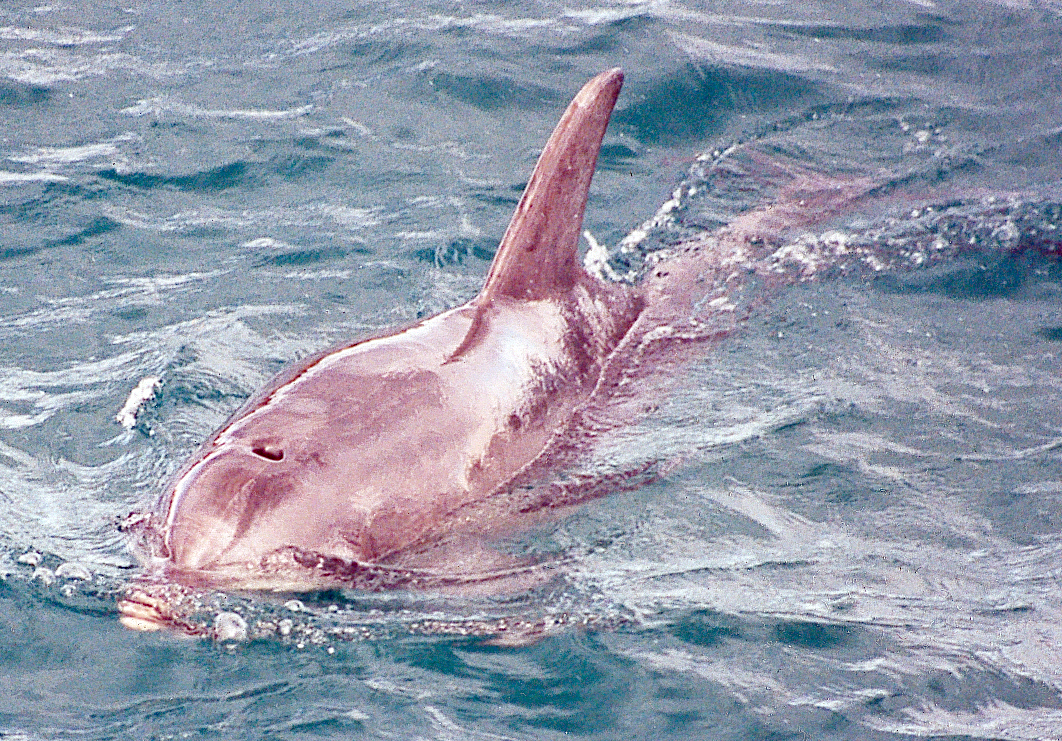
Endemic Burrunan dolphin in the bay

Small numbers of common dolphins have become residents in eastern parts of the bay since the late 2000s. In recent years, the numbers of southern humpback and southern right whales entering the bay of Port Phillip have shown increases. Unlike in Portland and on Great Ocean Road, Southern Rights in eastern Victorian waters are still critically endangered and in very small numbers; however, presences of cow-calf pairs in the bay in recent years indicate that Port Phillip was possibly once a wintering/calving ground for these whales. They swim very close to shores to take rests in shallow, sheltered waters, sometimes just next to piers in Frankston.

===== Burrunan dolphins =====
The bay is home to about 100 to 150 of the recently described species of bottlenose dolphin, the Burrunan dolphin (Tursiops australis). The other 50 or so of this rare species are to be found in the Gippsland Lakes.

=== Shellfish reefs ===
Port Phillip has lost over 95% of native flat oyster and blue mussel reefs since European settlement. In 2014 the Port Phillip Shellfish Reef restoration project set about restoring shellfish reefs at two locations off Hobsons Bay near St Kilda, and off Corio Bay near Avalon. 300,000 native Angasi oysters were laid on limestone rubble over a 600 square metre area. The project aimed to improve marine biodiversity, water quality and fish habitat.

=== Environmental issues ===
Like the Yarra which flows into it, Port Phillip faces the environmental concerns of pollution and water quality. Litter, silt and toxins can affect the beaches to the point where they are shut down by EPA Victoria.

In 2008, the owner and master of Hong Kong-registered container vessel MV Sky Lucky were found liable for illegally disposing garbage into Port Phillip, convicted and fined $35,000.

An Environmental Management Plan has been adopted for 2017-2027 in order to improve and ensure the water quality is helping the marine life flourish as well as divide the supervising of the Bay between the government, community and industries.

== Shipping ==
=== History ===
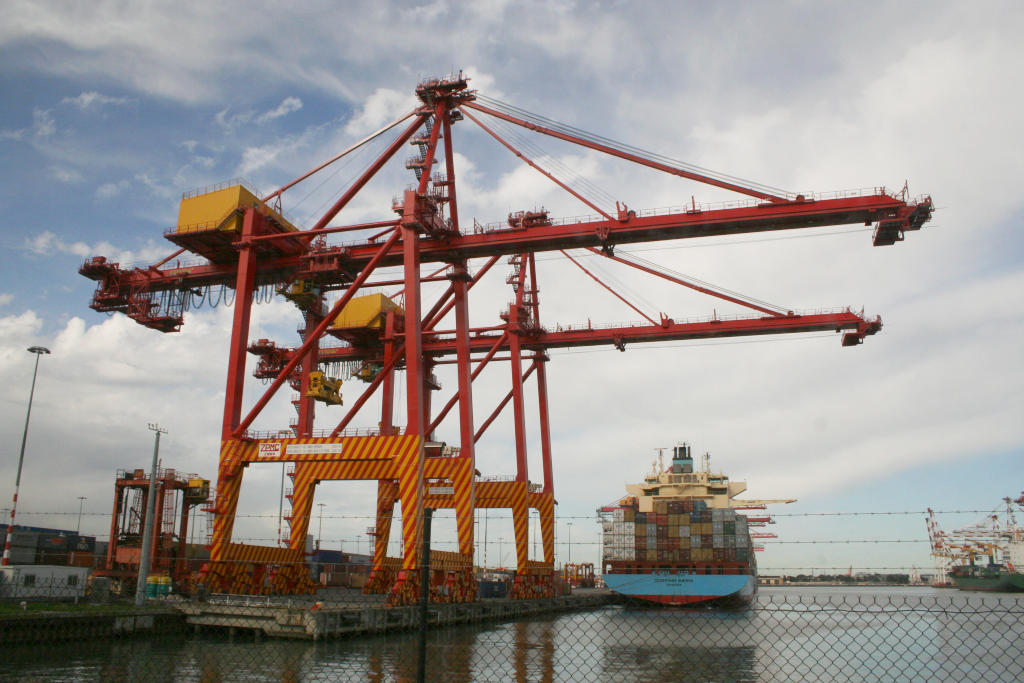
Container crane and ship at the Port of Melbourne.

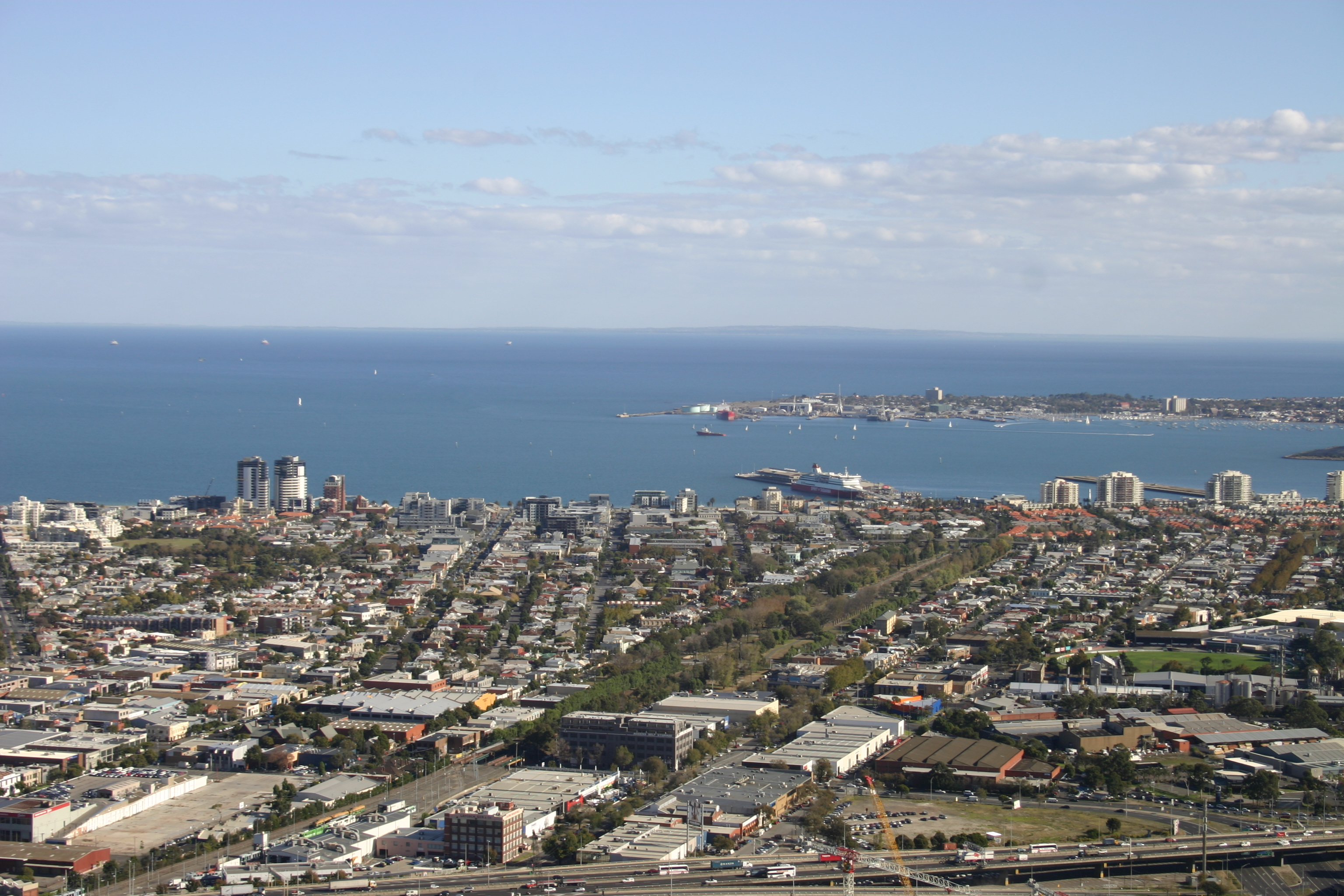
Port Phillip with Spirit of Tasmania ferry in port in Melbourne.

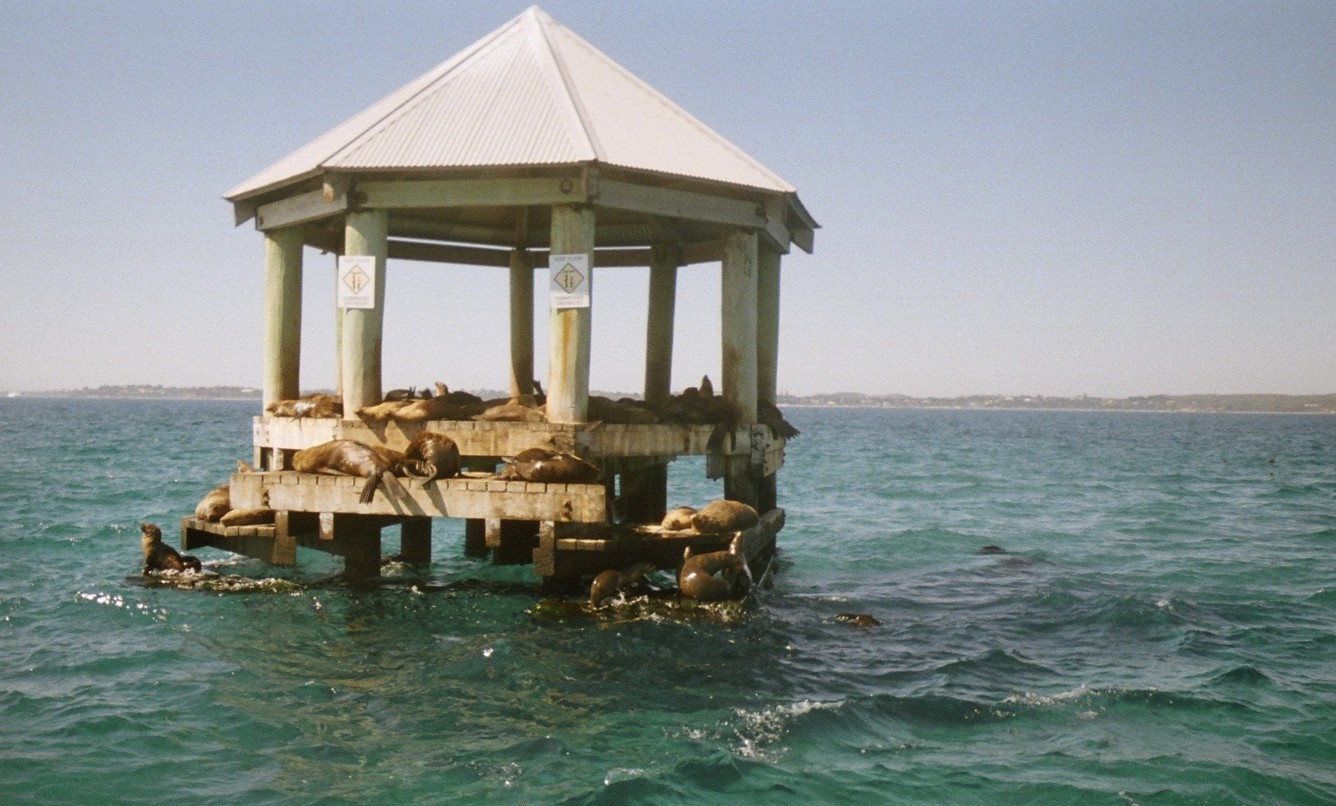
Chinaman's Hat and Australian fur seals

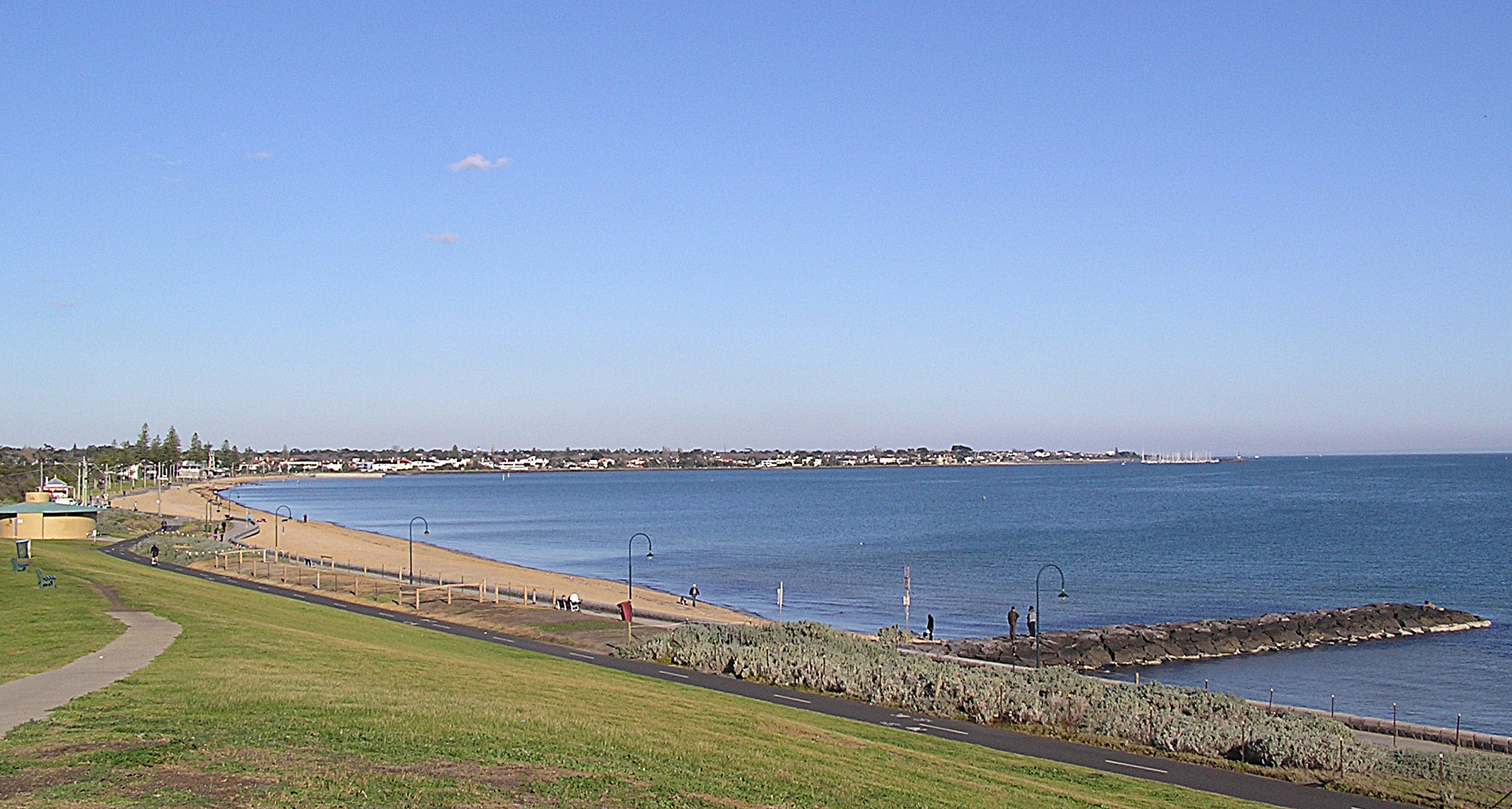
Elwood Beach & Port Phillip.

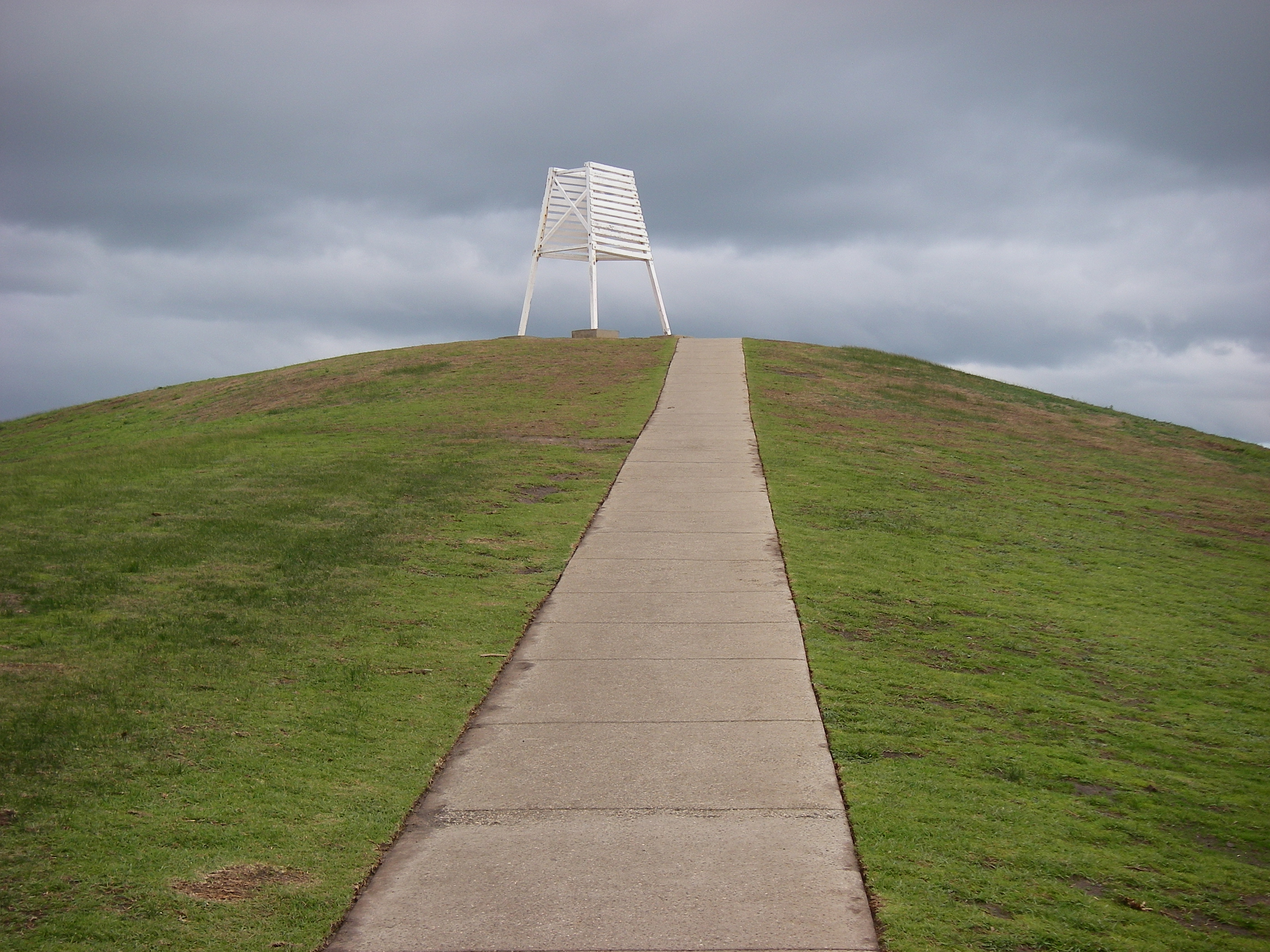
Point Ormond near Elwood, Victoria (2009).

The southern section of the Bay near the Heads is covered by extensive sand banks, known as the "Great Sand". A shipping channel was dredged in an east–west direction from the Heads to near Arthur's Seat late in the nineteenth century, and maintained ever since. Early shipping used piers at Sandridge (Port Melbourne), but later moved to various wharves along the Yarra River, which make up today's Port of Melbourne. The Melbourne Harbor Trust and Geelong Harbor Trust were responsible for the piers and wharves in their respective cities — they are now the government owned Port of Melbourne Corporation and the privately operated GeelongPort.

Today, the Port of Melbourne has grown to become Australia's busiest commercial port, serving Australia's second largest city and handling an enormous amount of imports and exports into and out of the country. The Port of Geelong also handles a large volume of dry bulk and oil, while nearby Port of Hastings on Western Port handles steel and oil products.

In 2004 the Victorian Government launched the Port Phillip Channel Deepening Project to deepen the existing shipping channels and the lower Yarra to accommodate deeper draft vessels. The lower Yarra sediments were identified as likely to be contaminated with toxic chemicals and heavy metals, and were to be contained within a sealed berm clear of the shipping channels south of the Yarra entrance. The vessel chosen for the dredging is the Queen of the Netherlands. 52 environmental groups, recreational fishing groups, and divers' groups formed the "Blue Wedges" group to oppose the proposed channel deepening and dredging with organised protests carried out, culminating in the group taking action in the Federal Court in January 2008 against the Commonwealth to stop it signing off on the project. On 15 January 2008 it was announced that their appeal was dismissed, with dredging starting soon after. The government announced the completion of works in November 2009, ahead of schedule and $200 million under budget.

=== Shipping channels ===
- South Channel – Extends from the area of the rip in an easterly direction where it terminates off the coast of Arthurs Seat. Vessels with a draught of 14.0m can be navigated through the channel at all tides. This is the main commercial shipping channel in the south of the bay allowing large ships access between the entrance of the bay and its middle regions.
- West Channel – Extends from the area of the rip, heads towards the north-west and ends off the coast of St Leonards. The depth varies, in May 1998 there was a minimum of 4.1 metres. Non-commercial vessels are still navigated through the channel; however, it is no longer used for commercial shipping.
- The Rip – Also referred to as "the heads" for shipping purposes, vessels with a draught of 14.0m can be navigated through the Heads during any height of tide. However, the passage of vessels can be restricted when the current through the rip is too strong. The flow through the Rip can be up to 8 knots dependent on the range of tide and environmental conditions.
- Melbourne Channels – Extends northwards through Hobsons Bay towards Station Pier and the entrance to the Yarra River. It is dredged to a depth of 15.5 metres and is the main shipping channel through the north of the bay into Melbourne's ports and docks. The channels include:

Melbourne Channel
Williamstown Channel
Port Melbourne Channel

- Geelong Channels – Begins off the coast of Point Richards and runs in a westerly direction through Outer Harbour and into Corio Bay where it splits in two heading north towards the modern Port of Geelong and south towards Cunningham Pier. The main Geelong channels are dredged to 12.3m. The City Channel while once used for wool exports is no longer used for commercial shipping. The channels include:

Point Richards Shipping Channel
Wilson Spit Shipping Channel
Hopetoun Shipping Channel
City Channel
Corio Channel

=== Shipping and cargo docks ===
- Bulk Grain Pier
- Corio Quay
- Cunningham Pier
- Gellibrand Pier
- Lascelles Wharf
- Point Henry Pier
- Point Wilson Pier
- Princes Pier
- Refinery Pier
- Station Pier
- Webb Dock

=== Ferries ===
- Searoad Ferries operates a vehicular ferry service across the mouth of the bay between dedicated terminals at Queenscliff and Sorrento using two roll-on roll-off vessels, the MV Queenscliff and the MV Sorrento built in 1993 and 2001 respectively.
- Port Phillip Ferries run twice daily fast ferry services between Melbourne Docklands and Portarlington on the Bellarine Peninsula and Docklands and Geelong. In 2017 they commissioned a new Incat ferry Bellarine Express. In 2019 it was joined by another Incat ferry of the same design Geelong Flyer which runs the service to Geelong.
- Ferries also run from St Kilda to Williamstown, Victoria across Hobsons Bay. These ferries, like the many recreational cruises, mostly operate for tourists and run around the bay in various locations.
- Spirit of Tasmania operates a RO-PAX service between the purpose built terminal at Spirit of Tasmania Quay in Geelong and the port in Devonport, Tasmania. Services run between Geelong and Devonport overnight throughout the year and 'Day Sails' operate during periods of high demand on select dates between September and April.

== Other features ==
=== Flagship ===
- Enterprize (1997) – Is Melbourne's Flagship, a replica of the Enterprize (1829), the tall ship that brought the first European settlers to Melbourne. She sails around Port Phillip throughout the year, visiting ports at Geelong, Williamstown, Portarlington, Rye and Blairgowrie.

=== Lighthouses ===
- Eastern Lighthouse (1854, 1883) – McCrae
- Queenscliff High Light (1843, 1862) – Queenscliff
- Queenscliff Low Light (1863) – Queenscliff
- Point Lonsdale Lighthouse (1902) – Point Lonsdale
- Port Melbourne Lighthouses (1924) – Port Melbourne
- South Channel Pile Light (1874) – Port Phillip
- West Channel Pile Light (1881) – Port Phillip
- Williamstown Lighthouse (1840, 1849, 1934) – Williamstown

=== Shipwrecks ===
Some of the more significant and historic shipwrecks in the bay include:

- William Salthouse – sunk 600 metres northeast of Pope's Eye (1841)
- Clarence – sunk after running aground (1850)
- Will O' the Wisp – sunk after running onto the sandbank William Sand, West Channel (1853)
- Mountain Maid – sunk off Swan Island after a collision with SS Queen (1856)
- Joanna – sunk after going around on the West Bank (1857)
- City of Launceston – sunk after a collision with Penola (1865)
- Eliza Ramsden – sunk near the South Channel (1875)
- Wauchope – beached at Portsea after she caught fire and part of her cargo exploded (1919)
- Ozone – scuttled off Indented Head (1925)
- HMAS Cerberus – scuttled in Half Moon Bay, Black Rock (1926)
- HMAS J3 – scuttled in Swan Bay (1926)
- HMAS J7 – scuttled off Hampton Beach (1926)
- River Burnett – the first ship to survive hitting Corsair Rock (1955)

== Tourism ==
The bay is one of Victoria's most popular tourist destinations. Many residents of Melbourne holiday on the shorelines of the bay, particularly the Bellarine (South west, near Geelong) and Mornington (south east of Melbourne) Peninsulas, most annually, either camping in tents, caravan or villas in caravan parks, sharing rental houses or staying in holiday homes.

== Recreation and sport ==
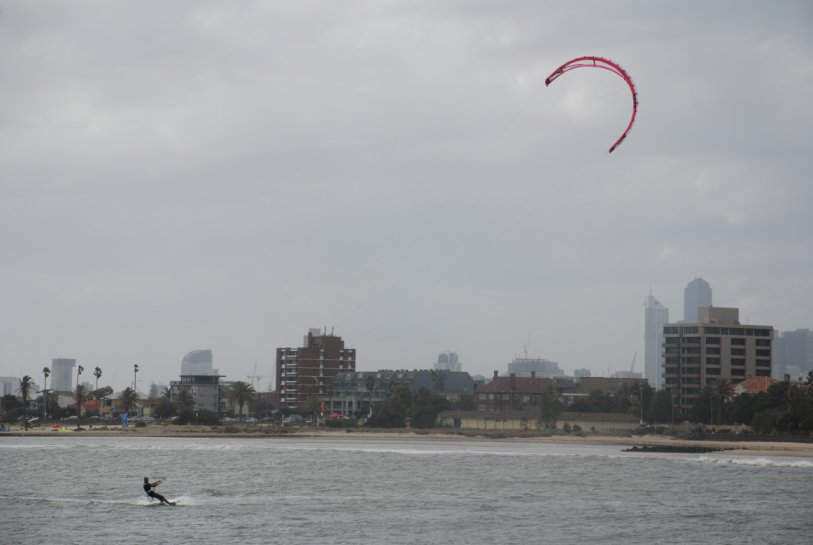
Kitesurfing at St Kilda on Port Phillip, Australia

Port Phillip's mostly flat topography and moderate waves make perfect conditions for recreational swimming, kitesurfing, windsurfing, sailing, boating, snorkeling, scuba diving, stand up paddle boarding (SUP) and other sports.

Port Phillip is home to 36 yacht clubs. It also hosts the Melbourne to Hobart and Melbourne to Launceston Yacht Races. Port Phillip is also home to a number of marinas, including large marinas at St. Kilda, Brighton and Geelong. For the 1956 Summer Olympics, it hosted the sailing events.

Dozens of lifesaving clubs dot Port Phillip, especially on the east coast from Altona to Frankston. These clubs provide volunteer lifesaving services and conduct sporting carnivals.

Port Phillip is also known as a temperate water scuba diving destination. The shore dives from beaches and piers around the Bay provide a wide variety of experiences on day and night dives. Boat diving in Port Phillip provides access to a remarkable variety of diving environments including wrecks, reefs, drift dives, scallop dives, seal dives and wall dives. Of particular interest are the five scuttled J-Class World War 1 submarines and the Ships' Graveyard off Torquay. With 3 Marine Sanctuaries and easily accessible piers, Port Phillip is also popular for recreational snorkeling.

There are also a number of bike paths, including the Bayside Trail and the Hobsons Bay Coastal Trail.

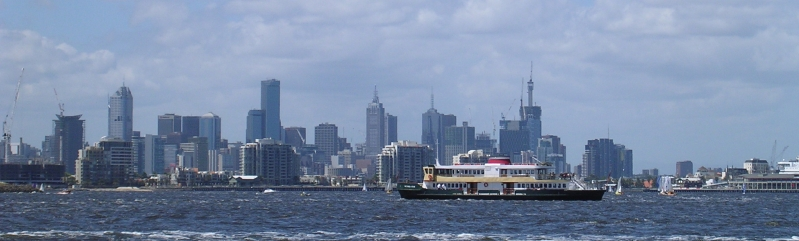
Melbourne skyline (c. 2005) viewed from Hobsons Bay

== See also ==
- Fort Nepean
- Fort Pearce
- Fort Queenscliff
- Port Phillip Bay Bridge proposals
