= Anthony's Nose (disambiguation) =

Anthony's Nose is a peak overlooking the Hudson River near Peekskill, New York

Anthony's Nose or Anthony's Nose may also refer to:

- Anthonys Nose (Victoria), a point on Port Phillip, Australia
- Anthony's Nose (Washington County, New York), a peak on Lake George near Glenburnie, New York
- Anthony's Nose, a peak in the Franklin Mountains, El Paso County, Texas
