= Blue Wedges =

Australian conservation organisation

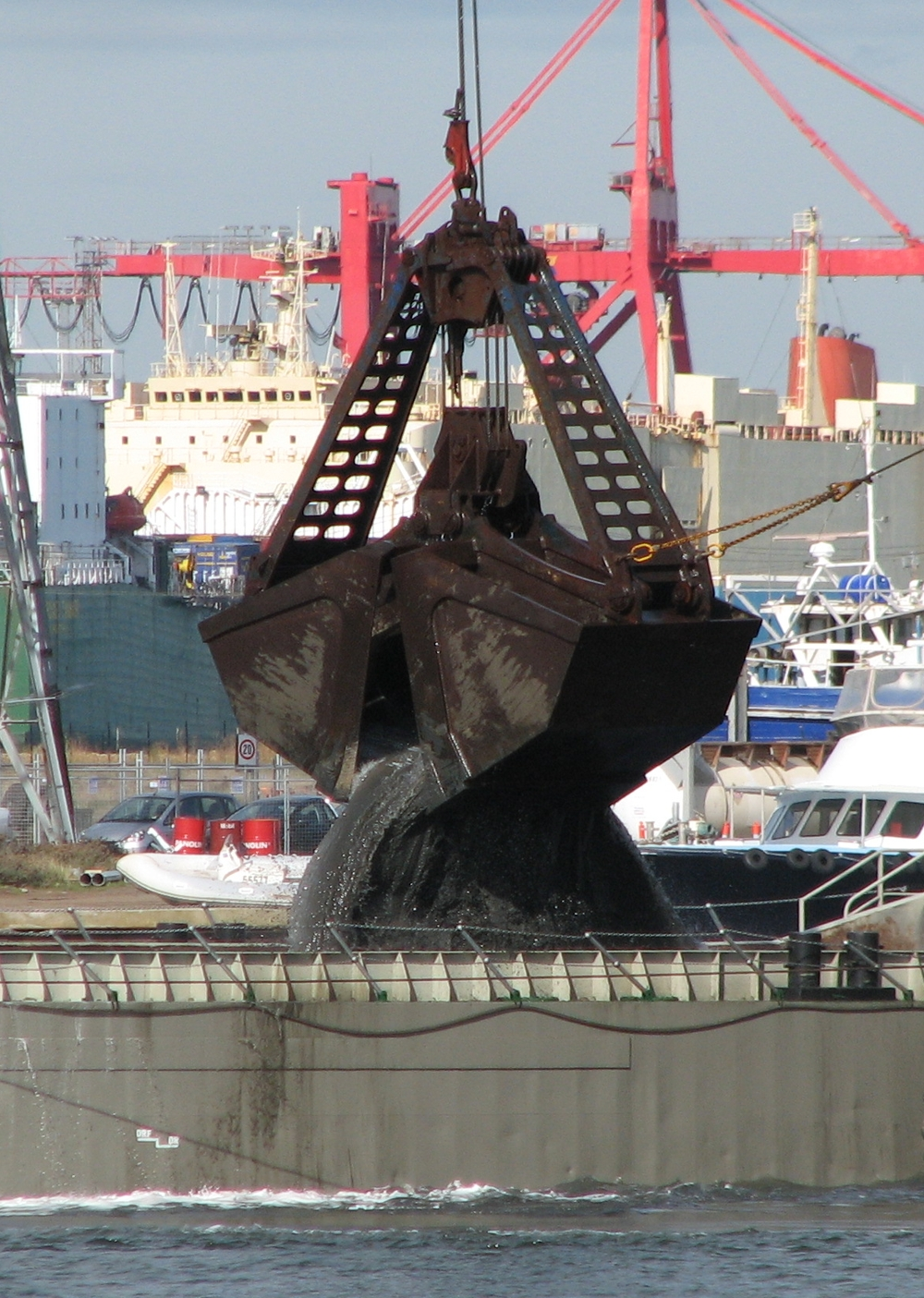
Dredged material from the Yarra River being deposited

Blue Wedges is a conservation organisation in conflict with Australia's Victorian government policy to deepen shipping channels in Port Phillip and the large scale development of Ramsar listed Westernport. The Blue Wedges is a coalition of over 65 environmental and bay user groups opposed to development in the Melbourne bays that they deem to be unsustainable, such as the Port of Melbourne Corporation's Channel Deepening Project. The Blue Wedges Coalition includes angling groups and peak bodies, professional fishing associations, diving and charter operators along with the more traditional coastal protection groups and bayside industry sectors. The Blue Wedges Coalition is supported in its goal to protect the bays by other environmental entities including the Victorian National Parks Association, Australian Conservation Foundation, Friends of the Earth, The Wilderness Society, Environment Victoria, Port Phillip Conservation Council and Western Region Environment Centre under a joint statement issued by these groups opposing the project and calling for action to stop the project from the Victorian Government.

In Victoria, the name "Blue Wedges" was created after a previous "Green Wedges" government policy for rural and forest conservation around the edges of the expanding Melbourne metropolitan region. Green Wedges is an already existing part of the governments environmental policy.

In December 2007, it was announced that Blue Wedges took action in the Federal Court against the Commonwealth to stop it signing off on the deepening shipping channels project. The case was heard in January 2008, with the Federal Court deciding against Blue Wedges on 15 January 2008. On 30 January 2008, Blue Wedges won a reprieve in the Federal Court with a hearing date of 20 February 2008. After mediation between Blue Wedges and the Port of Melbourne Corporation (the body responsible for the deepening operations) on 6 February 2008, limited operations were allowed to commence on 8 February 2008.

Jenny Warfe, the president of the Blue Wedges was interviewed on local radio in 2013, about the denials of the subsequent beach erosion removing sand from Portsea front beach after completion of the Port Phillip Bay's channel deepening dredging program.

== See also ==
- Port Phillip Channel Deepening Project
- Green belt
- Clean Ocean Foundation
