= Port Phillip Channel Deepening Project =

The Port Phillip Channel Deepening Project (PPCDP) began on 8 February 2008 to deepen the shipping channels leading to Melbourne, Australia.

The project was to deepen channels in Port Phillip to 14 metres (46 ft) draught to allow greater access for container ships. An estimated A$969 million was to be spent on the works, with $150 million funded by taxpayers. The dredging works were conducted by Dutch company Royal Boskalis for the Port of Melbourne Corporation (PoMC), a statutory body established by the Victorian Government responsible for the running of the port, at a cost of $500 million and was expected to be completed before 31 December 2009, pending auditor reports and various legal actions against the project. This project was to be conducted under a controversial Public-Private-Partnership.

Operating almost 24 hours a day, the project involved the removal of approximately 22.9 million m^{3} (810 million cu ft) of sand, fine river silt (including about around 3 million m^{3} (110 million cu ft) of contaminated sediment). The material removed was transported to designated "dump sites". According to numerous scientists, community representatives, environmental and community groups, the dredging would disturb marine plant, animal and microbial life through large areas of the bay.

The project caused significant controversy among many communities throughout the Victorian population, and was strongly opposed by scientists such as biologists and geologists, the CSIRO, university academics and scientists including Monash University, and many groups representing the community including the Dive Industry of Victoria, the Victorian Greens, the Australian Peak Shippers' Association, and the Victorian National Parks Association. The amalgamated community group Blue Wedges held public rallies and several pickets from 2004 to 2008, involving surfers, canoes, kayaks, boats and yachts who put themselves in the path of the dredging ship Queen of the Netherlands, which delayed the project for a time. The project eventually began, although under limited conditions, after Blue Wedges won a reprieve in the Federal Court. The limited conditions were stripped from 28 March 2008 after ensuing legal proceedings saw the Blue Wedges case dismissed. Legal costs were pursued by the state government.

In 2009 the Victorian Auditor-General's report was released. The Auditor-General sourced information on what percentage of ships could and could not enter the bay, from the Port of Melbourne exclusively, who had twice previously overestimated the number of ships that could not enter the bay prior to dredging. In contrast, in the Drewry Report, the more accurate calculation of ships that were not loading to full capacity in Melbourne was calculated to be between 10% and 4% -- this Drewry Report was commissioned by the Port of Melbourne Corporation (PoMC previously VCA) in 2001, but was not made accessible to the public until the Victorian Greens obtained it under a Freedom of Information request in 2005—the Drewry Report concluded that, were the channel deepening project to be completely cancelled, the economic loss from this small percentage of ships unable to load to capacity would be in the vicinity of $13 million, rather than the $30 million that had previously been claimed by PoMC. Furthermore, the Drewry Report also concluded that a dredge of 0.5 metres would be sufficient for 96% of vessels, and the PoMC's planned dredge to 2.5 metres depth was "extreme" and "potentially disastrous" and expensive and unnecessary. In addition, almost all of the shipping companies that use Melbourne's ports stated that there was no need for dredging or channel deepening in the bay or around the ports.

The government announced the completion of works in November 2009, ahead of schedule and $200 million under budget.

== The project ==
The Port Phillip Channel Deepening Project was carried out by Dutch dredging company Royal Boskalis for the Port of Melbourne Corporation. The PoMC also sought the assistance of Boskalis Australia Pty Ltd, a daughter company of Royal Boskalis.

Prior to the completion of the works, ships entering the Port of Melbourne were restricted to 11.6 m (38.1 ft) draught (12.1 m (40 ft) at high tide). Larger container ships instead need 14 m (46 ft) to carry full loads. The PoMC estimated that in the 2006-07 financial year, 38.5% of ships visiting the port was already potentially affected by draught limitations because the channel did not allow for the extra depth, with this figure rising to 44.3% in the December quarter of 2007. The key objective of the Channel Deepening Project was to address these draught restrictions.

=== Project areas ===
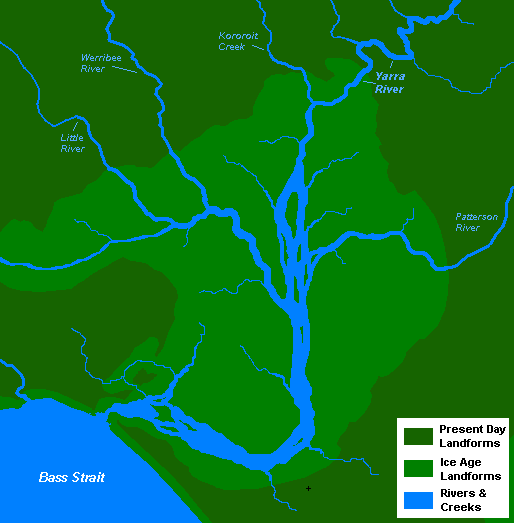
The course of the Yarra River around 10,000 years ago, after the end of the last ice age, prior to the creation of Port Phillip.

The PoMC has specified four project 'areas' of the bay to be completed progressively.

Project No. and Area	Shipping channel(s)	Location	Status	Start	Finish	Dredging volumes/Type of material dredged
1. Yarra River and Hobsons Bay	Yarra River & Williamstown Channels		Completed	24 April 2008		5.38 million m^{3} of clay and silt, approximately 2.07 million m^{3} of this contaminated
2. North of Bay	Port Melbourne Channel		Completed	29 February 2008		2.40 million m^{3} of mainly clay, approximately 43, 000 m^{3} of this contaminated
3. South of Bay	South Channel		Completed	8 February 2008		14.59 million m^{3} of mainly sand
4. The Entrance	The Great Ship Channel		Completed	5 April 2008		0.55 million m^{3} of limestone/sandstone

Yarra River and Hobsons Bay

North of Bay

The second area to be dredged, dredging was expected to begin in this area but was delayed after a court injunction, with dredging instead beginning in the south of the bay.

South of bay

The first area to be dredged under limited conditions specified in a court injunction.

The Entrance

The Entrance was argued to be one of the more sensitive areas of Port Phillip Bay to be dredged, after a rockfall incident that occurred during trial dredging in 2005.

=== Disposal of dredged material ===
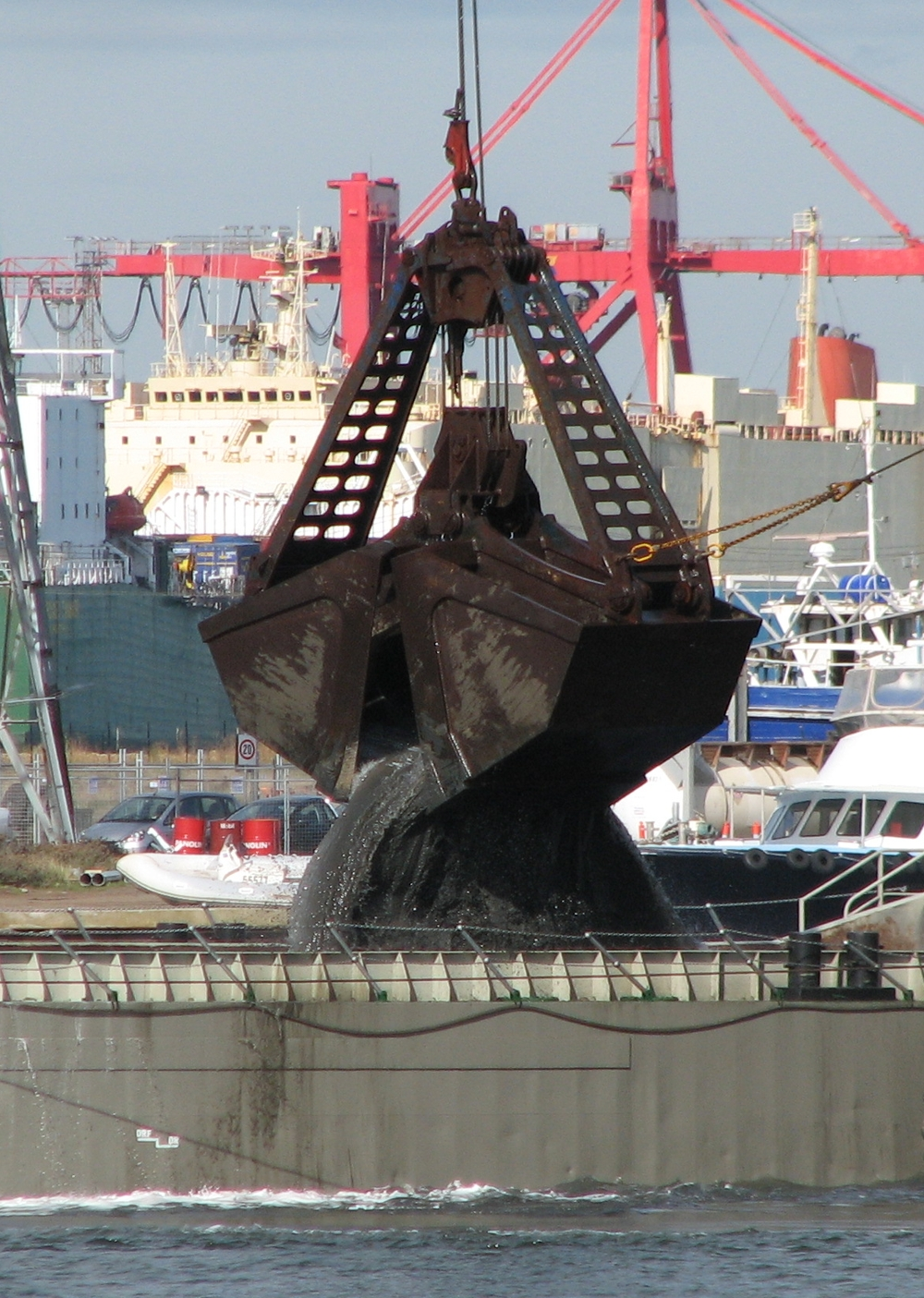
Dredged material from the Yarra River being deposited by a grab dredge on to a barge.

Materials dredged in Port Phillip were disposed of in two areas.

Contaminated dredged material from the Port Melbourne, Williamstown and Yarra River channels was disposed of in the existing Port of Melbourne Dredge Material Ground (DMG), which covers an area of about 9.36 km^{2} (3.61 sq mi) (or approximately 0.48% of the total bay area). The site was expected to be extended to the south by an area of 2.7 km^{2} (1.0 sq mi) (or approximately 0.14% of the bay) to accommodate the dredged material volumes as a result of the dredging project as well as to accommodate dredged material volumes from future maintenance dredging.

Uncontaminated dredged material from the South Channel and the Great Ship Channel was to be disposed of in a dredged material ground yet to be built in the south east part of the bay, expected to cover an area of 7.68 km^{2} (2.97 sq mi) (or approximately 0.39% of the bay area).

Those materials which are contaminated were to be stored in an underwater clay containment area known as a 'bund' at the existing Port of Melbourne DMG, and capped with clean dredged sand.

=== Environmental management ===
Various environmental monitoring activities must be carried out by the PoMC as stipulated in the Environmental Management Plan (EMP)

- Turbidity monitoring

A new, risk-based approach to setting limits on turbidity so as to protect seagrasses in the southern regions of the Bay was developed by Environmetrics Australia. Six-hourly Exponentially Weighted Moving Average (EWMA) control charts and 2-week moving average control charts were also developed by Environmetrics Australia. These calculation tools provide, respectively, an early warning capability and an assessment of the likelihood that minimum light requirements for seagrasses will be maintained.

- Office of the Environmental Monitor

In 2007, the Office of the Environmental Monitor, an independent government body, was established to scrutinize the environmental proceedings of the project, in particular, to make sure that the project conforms to the EMP. The objectives of the independent body were to "Be accessible to all stakeholders and the community; Scrutinise, report and advise on the Project’s environmental performance in an independent and transparent way; Communicate all available information on the Project’s environmental performance in a timely manner to stakeholders and the community."

- Environmental Protection Authority
- Monitoring Tool

The use of a robust monitoring tool in providing accurate and timely information was an important aspect of the project. SRA Information Technology provided its EnviroSys software as the tool whereby turbidity monitoring and vessel tracking could occur in real time. Early warning alerts could be generated by the monitoring tool to inform when predefined exceedance levels had been triggered.

=== Project approval ===
Cooperating with the Environment Effects Act 1978, the PoMC released its Environmental Effects Statement (EES), a report on the environmental, economic and social impacts of the channel deepening project, on 5 July 2004. The EES was available for public viewing until 16 August 2004 and an independent panel sat from 21 September to 17 December 2004 to hear submissions and consider the environmental effects and issues raised in the EES. In February 2005, the independent panel released their report on the EES, presenting 137 key aspects of the EES which needed building on. These included further examination of channel deepening designs; investigation of dredging technology; investigation of best methods of sediment disposal, and examination of turbidity. The panel's recommendations led to the Trial Dredge Program (TDP) that took place from 6 August 2005.

Consequently, on 31 March 2005, the then Minister for Planning Rob Hulls announced that the PoMC would be required to carry out a Supplementary Environmental Effects Statement (SEES) to further investigate the environmental impact of the dredging project and address its shortcomings. Hulls said the SEES would "build upon the EES process to date" and would be "based upon the key areas outlined by the panel and allow for further expert analysis". On 21 March 2007 the PoMC released its Supplementary Environment Effects Statement (SEES) for public viewing until 7 May.

The EES and the SEES culminated in the Environmental Management Plan (EMP), a report prepared by the PoMC consisting of "regulatory controls, environmental controls, project delivery standards and environmental monitoring" for the channel deepening project. On 5 February 2008, Environment Minister Peter Garrett approved of the EMP.

== Timeline ==
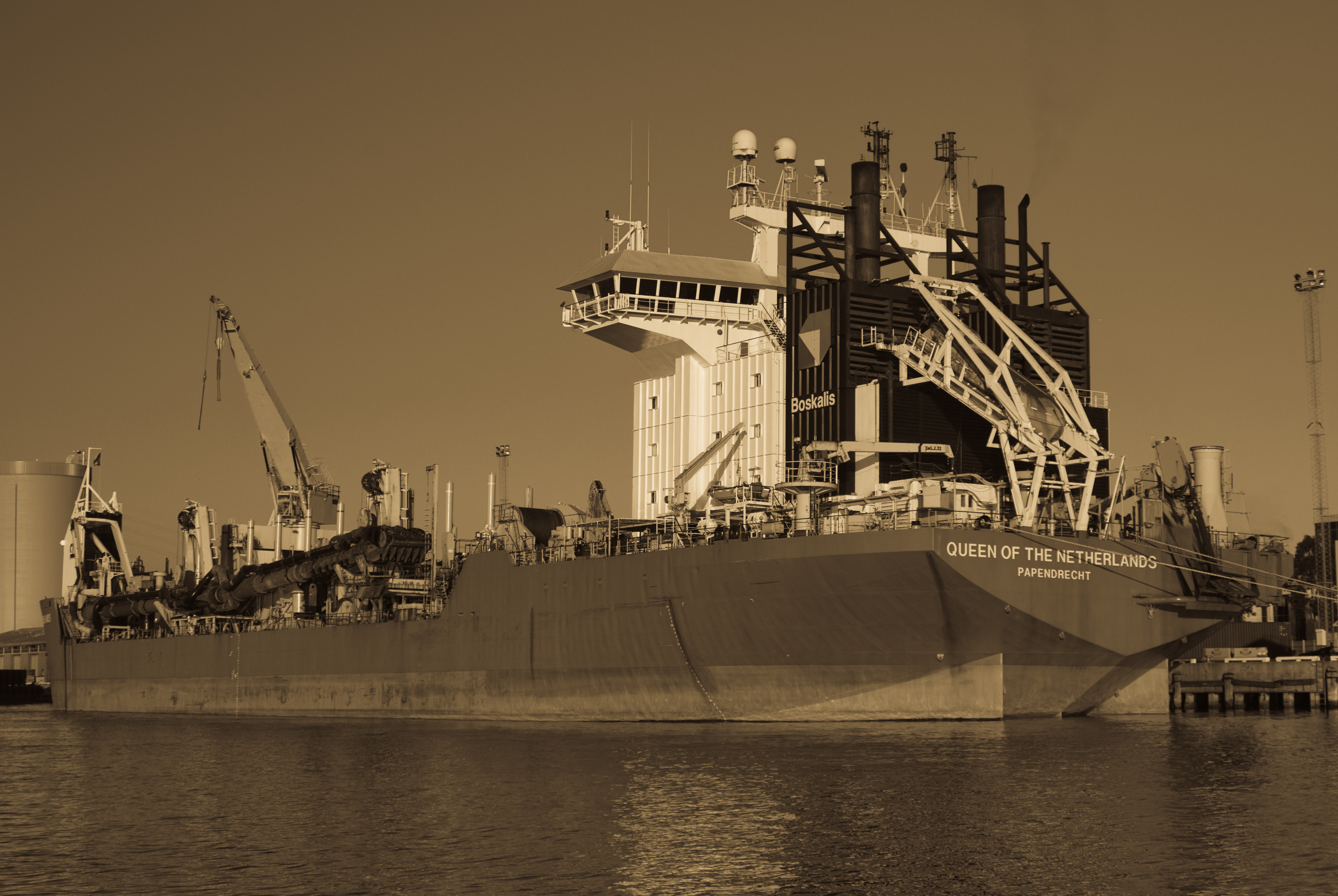
The Queen of the Netherlands docked at the Port

=== 2004 ===
- July
  - 5 July - The Environmental Effects Statement (EES) is released by the PoMc for public viewing until 16 August.
  - The PoMC enters into alliance with Royal Boskalis.
- 21 September - An independent panel sits until 17 December to hear submissions and consider the environmental effects and issues raised in the EES.

=== 2005 ===
- February - The EES Panel Report presents 137 recommendations regarding the EES.
- 31 March - Minister for Planning Rob Hulls announces that the PoMC are required to carry out a Supplementary Environmental Effects Statement (SEES).
- 5 August - A Blue Wedges injunction to stop the trial dredging fails as the objection is dismissed by the Supreme Court of Victoria.
- 6 August - The A$32 million nine-week Trial Dredge Program (TDP) carried out by the Queen of the Netherlands begins.
  - A rockfall incident occurs at an area known as the Canyon at The Heads, with the PoMC stating that the rockfall is minor and damage is minimal and temporary.
- 30 September - Trial dredging ends two weeks ahead of schedule and within budget.

=== 2007 ===
- 21 March - The Supplementary Environment Effects Statement (SEES) is released for public viewing by the PoMC until 7 May.
- 4 April - Minister for Planning at the time, Justin Madden, announces the members of the panel the independent panel that will consider the SEES for the dredging project.
- May - Blue Wedges releases its submission to the Supplementary Environment Effects Statement.
  - Days before the Inquiry Panel is due to adjourn, the PoMC presents documents stating that the rockfall of August 2005 was in fact much larger than initially reported with 6,000 m^{3} (211,888 cu ft), or approximately 9,900 t (9,744 long tons) of rock, falling down the canyon wall, damaging sealife inside the canyon.
- December
  - Victorian Minister for Environment and Climate Change Gavin Jennings gives the project approval under the Coastal Management Act 1995.
  - Federal Minister for Environment Peter Garrett gives the project approval to proceed under the Environment Protection and Biodiversity Conservation Act 1999.
- 5 December - Blue Wedges wins the right to challenge Environment Minister Peter Garrett's right to sign off on the dredging project, with the plan to take the matter to the Federal Court in January 2008.

=== 2008 ===
- 15 January - The Federal Court of Australia dismisses the Blue Wedges claim.
- 17 January - The Black Marlin transport ship enters Port Phillip carrying equipment to assist with dredging.
- 18 January - The Queen of the Netherlands leaves Singapore on its journey to Melbourne.
- 29 January
  - The Queen of the Netherlands docks at the South Wharf in Melbourne at 11:00 am after entering the heads. Approximately 25 protest boats tail it as is enters the heads and a smaller group gather on the shore at the mouth of the Yarra River and paddle on kayaks and surfboards as the ship passes under the West Gate Bridge. Seven protesters are arrested for endangering their lives after breaching maritime safety regulations. ^{1}
  - Victorian Premier John Brumby confirms the cost of the actual dredging as $500 million (approximately €300 million). This comes after Royal Boksalis Westminster provided the figure to the European stock exchange Euronext.
- 30 January - Blue Wedges wins a reprieve in the Federal Court with a hearing date of 20 February 2008.
  - Premier of Victoria John Brumby made an emotional plea for the Victorian public to support the project and declared that Melbourne risks becoming "a backwater like Adelaide" and that Melbourne "would die a slow death" if dredging in Port Phillip Bay did not go ahead.
- 5 February - Federal Environment Minister Peter Garrett approves the dredging project after reviewing the Environmental Management Plan (EMP). He announces new conditions, including monitoring of water and tidal currents and contaminated sediment not being able to escape from the dredger.
- 6 February - Negotiations are held between Blue Wedges and the Port of Melbourne Corporation. Limited operations are allowed to commence on 8 February until the hearing date of 20 February. The limited conditions, specified in a court order, state that only one million cubic metres (to a depth of 15.8 m (51.8 ft)) can be dredged in an 8 km (5.0 mi) zone in the southern channel (the PoMC had planned dredging the north of the bay first). The dredged material is to be deposited in a designated area about 3.5 km (2.2 mi) off Mount Martha.
- 8 February
  - Limited dredging by the Queen of the Netherlands begins in the southern end of the bay off Rye at 8:30 am.
  - The Queen of the Netherlands is tailed by Blue Wedges.
  - At about 8:15 am, ten activists on surfboards and five in kayaks from the protest group Operation Quarrantine breached the 200 m (656 ft) exclusion zone (which states that "bathing, diving and the operation (including anchoring, mooring or allowing a vessel or craft to lie) of vessels and craft, are prohibited within 200 metres of the Queen of the Netherlands whilst that vessel is under way around the Queen of the Netherlands) in an attempt to stop it, with the Dredge coming to a stop only metres from the protesters. Two activists are detained by police. Channel deepening is delayed by 40 minutes while the protesters are cleared. All were reportedly fined $176.
- 17 February - About 1, 000 protesters congregate near Rosebud Pier to protest against the dredging operation.
- 21 February - The Federal Court of Australia adjourns Blue Wedges' case against the dredging of Port Phillip until 3 March. Limited dredging is allowed to continue during this time.

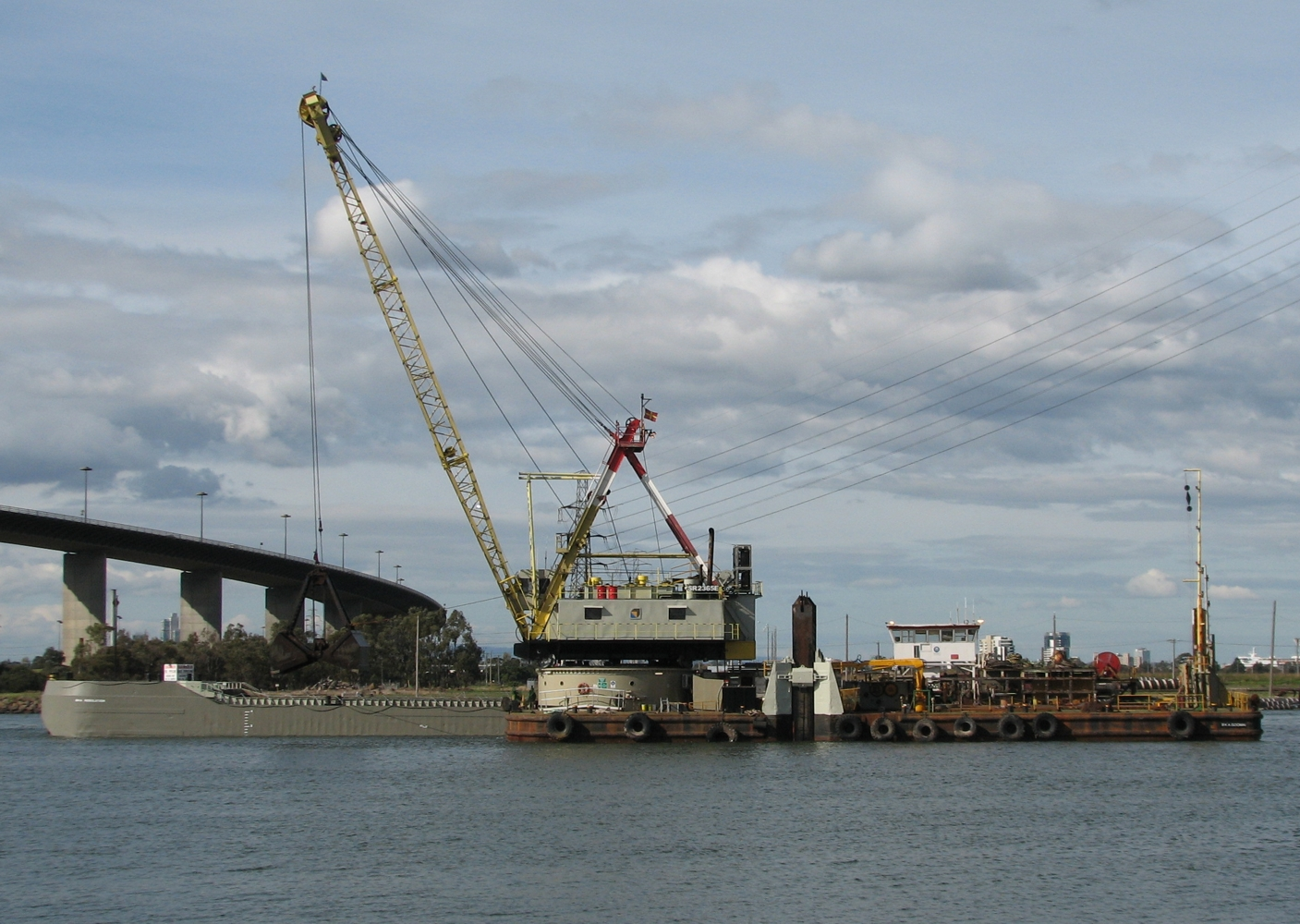
Goomai and barge Resolution during dredging operations on the Yarra River.

- 28 February - The Legislative Council of the Parliament of Victoria decide to examine the economic case for the dredging project after growing concerns about the project's financial benefit. The motion is put forward by the Greens MP Sue Pennicuik.
- 28 March - The Federal Court of Australia dismisses the Blue Wedges case against Peter Garrett approval of the project, with justice Tony North putting forward that Blue Wedges had not established that he failed to act within the law. Justice North maintains that "It is not the function of the court to make a judgement as to whether the channel deepening is a good thing or a bad thing or whether it is harmful to the environment or not", only whether the Garrett acted within the bounds of the law.
- 5 April
  - Dredging by the Queen of the Netherlands begins at The Entrance.
  - 200 protesters gather on each side of The Entrance (at Point Nepean and Point Lonsdale) and boats, power-skis and surfboards. Police issue seven infringement notices to members of protest group Operation Quarantine for breaching the exclusion zone around the ship and lighting flares.
- 24 April - Dredging begins in the Yarra River by the grab dredge Goomai.

=== 2009 ===
- 26 November - the State Government announces the completion of works, ahead of schedule and $200 million under budget.

== Environmental impact ==
The principal concern of the project lies in its potential for severe long-term environmental consequences. On this front, major opposition to the project has come from the community group Blue Wedges, a coalition of over 65 environmental groups, which legally challenged the PoMC and the Victorian Government and was subsequently forced into bankruptcy due to the pursuit of legal costs by the state government.

During trial dredging in 2005, a rockfall incident occurred in an area of The Heads known as the Canyon, which caused some of the rock in this area to scour and disintegrate. Much of the Port Phillip heads falls under the Port Phillip Heads Marine National Park due to its significant marine diversity and marine geological formations.

== Cost and economic benefits ==
In 1997, the cost of the project was estimated at $100 million. In 2001, the projected cost was estimated at around $200 million to $230 million and in 2004 it rose from $337 million in June to $498 million in August to $545 million in September. In 2006 in March 2007, the cost of the project was projected at $763 million and in 2008 it rose to $969 million.

Also, the $500 million cost of the actual dredging work carried out by Royal Boskalis was claimed to have been kept secret by the Victorian Government and the PoMC, who entered into alliance with Royal Boskalis in 2004, for at least for 3 years. Under Victorian legislation passed in 2000, all contracts worth more than $10 million must be published - the cost of the dredging was above this at the time, yet details were not released.

The PoMC estimates that the direct economic benefits as a result of the dredging are $2 billion. However, a study commissioned by the Australian Conservation Foundation (carried out by Melbourne-based firm Economists at Large) raised questions about the economic benefits of the project. The study reported that the basis upon which the economic benefits were originally calculated had drastically changed, with given rising costs and legal proceedings, concluding it was no longer economically viable:
