= Chinaman's Hat (Port Phillip) =

Navigational aid and seal haul-out in Victoria, Australia

Coordinates: 38.2864°S 144.7240°E

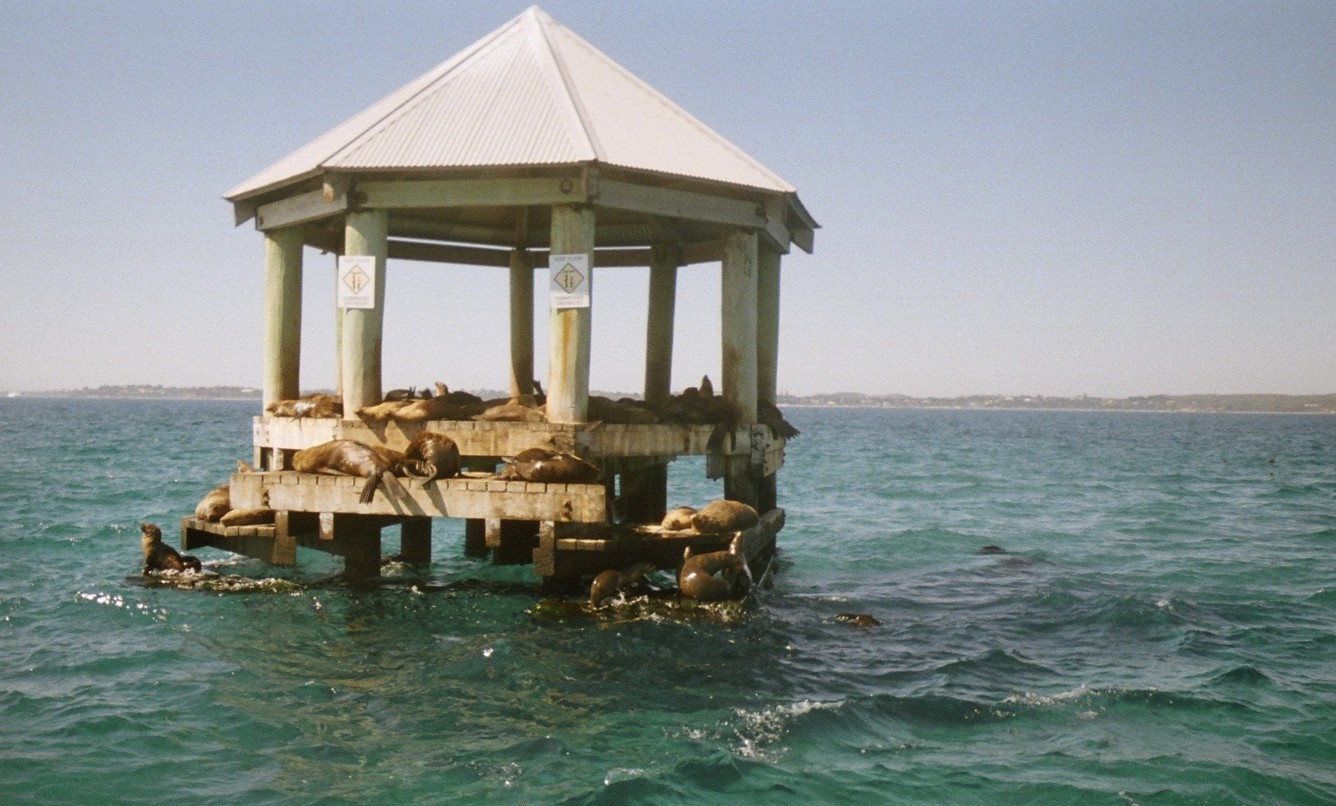
New version of Chinaman's Hat

Chinaman's Hat is an octagonal structure in the South Channel of Port Phillip, in the Australian state of Victoria, which serves as a shipping channel marker and haul-out for local brown fur seals. It is in the Mornington Peninsula Shire, 3 km (1.9 mi) east-south-east of Pope's Eye. Along with the latter, it served as a navigation beacon at the Heads of the bay.

== History ==
The term Chinaman's Hat, the name once associated with a former military structure, Station M, was transferred to a new seal platform erected by Parks Victoria in 2002.

Postwar, a structure was built to replace a dilapidated military installation which had been erected on a dolphin, shortly before 1942, as part of the Port Phillip defence system. That structure is often said to have supported an optical mount, or magic eye, which transmitted two piezo electronic beams across the Rip to a large mirror, and then to two reflectors, respectively Station P and Station S, at The Heads at Point Lonsdale. Any break in transmission in the system was designed to set off an alarm signalling the possible presence of enemy vessels. The device apparently did not function as expected, and the equipment was removed two years later, in 1944. However, some doubts have been expressed regarding the existence of that interception system, although the site certainly was equipped in wartime with underwater indicator loops to detect submarines. After it was abandoned, the dilapidated remains were used as a perch for both recreational fishing and as an anchorage. It rested on a circular concrete caisson base, roughly 7 m (23 ft) in diameter, raised on a sandy shoal some 6 m (20 ft) below the waterline.

In early 2002, Parks Victoria was granted a permit to demolish the old structure, after arguing that it posed a risk for small craft navigation and was devoid of heritage value. In the face of public protests, the authority built an expensive alternative platform, at a cost of A$210,000, which was quickly disparaged by critics at the time as a veritable "Taj Mahal for seals". The new structure for the seal colony was grounded on a rectangular base and lies not far from the Mud Islands bird sanctuary. At first, the seals refused to budge from their traditional, run-down landmark, and it was only after the authorities demolished the old haul-out that they settled on the new platform. The new structure now carries the name Chinaman's Hat.

The present structure is one of four haul-outs or resting sites in the bay, and is occupied by a bachelor community of the Australian fur seals. It is a popular destination for scuba divers and snorkelers. Visitors to the site are warned to keep their distance, because the seals can react aggressively to people who approach too close.

== See also ==
- South Channel Pile Light
- West Channel Pile Light
