= Clean Ocean Foundation =

Australian environmental organisation

The Clean Ocean Foundation is an Australian environmental organisation that seeks to stop all forms of ocean pollution and restore our oceans to their former health.

Clean Ocean Foundation was founded in the early 2000s by Australian surfers concerned about the effect of pollution on their health. The Foundation developed a campaign in the period 2001-2005.

Surfers were joined in 2000 by families and fisherman who became concerned at the high level of pollution at Mornington Peninsula surf beaches such as Gunnamatta. The Foundation was successful in convincing the Victorian State Government to commit over 400 million dollars to upgrade Eastern Treatment Plant that discharges to Boags Rock Outfall near Gunnamatta beach.

Following this major victory, the Foundation is working towards the recycling of all wastewater from 254 outfalls around Australia to minimise the environmental effects of wastewater on the marine environment whilst also ensuring a vital source of water on a dry continent is not wasted.

The Foundation has also been successful in lobbying the NHMRC for Australia's recreational water guidelines to be raised to match World Health Organization criteria.

Clean Ocean's mission is: "To protect our ocean ecosystem and establish sustainable water management practices."

== See also ==
- Blue Wedges
