= Anthonys Nose (Victoria) =

Point, or escarpment in Victoria, Australia

Coordinates: 38.344°S 144.937°E

Anthonys Nose is a point, or escarpment located on the southern shore of Port Phillip Bay, between Dromana and McCrae, in Victoria, Australia.

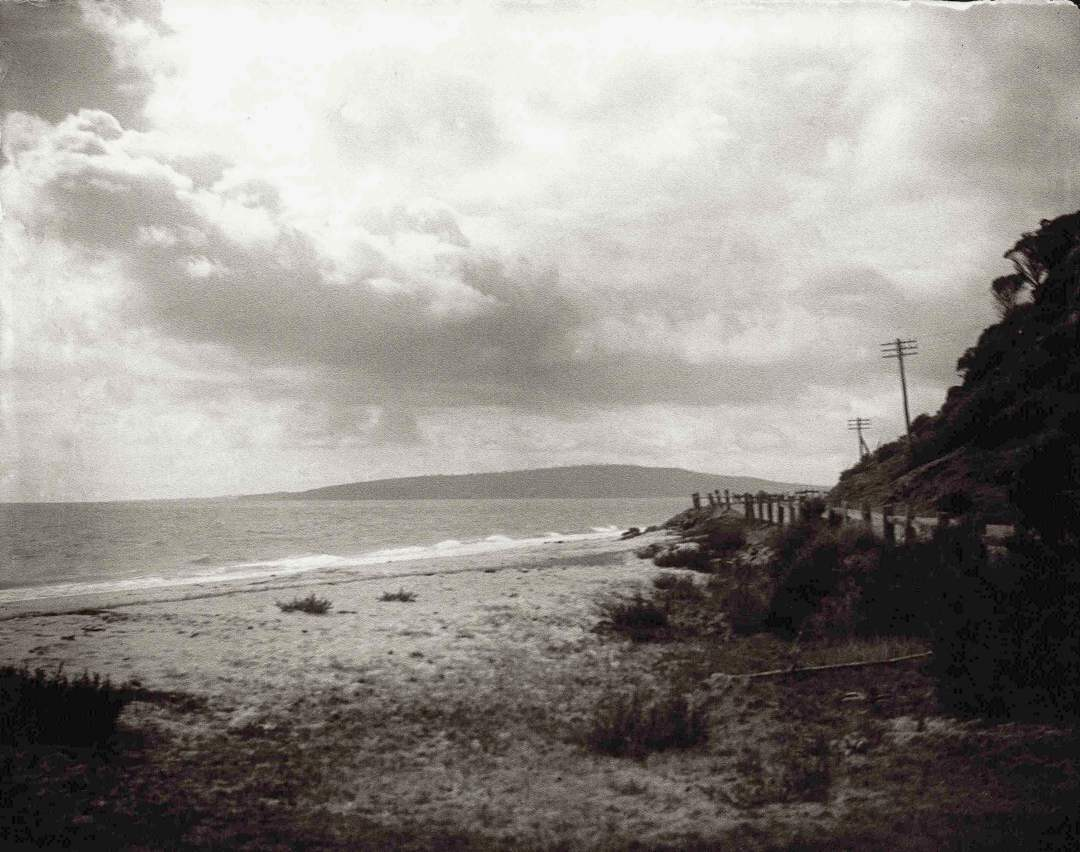
Anthony's Nose, Port Phillip Bay: 1920

== History ==
It was named by Charles La Trobe, who became the Superintendent of the Port Phillip District of New South Wales in 1839. He thought that the landform had a strong resemblance to Anthony's Nose (Westchester) on the Hudson River, New York.

In the early years of the European settlement of Dromana there were geographical obstacles to travelling by land. A journey from Melbourne to the area meant crossing swamps and streams. Anthony's Nose was the point where Arthur's Seat ended as the mountain "fell steeply to the sea". At high tide a traveller by foot, horse, or wagon found it necessary to wade, ride or drive through the water in order to round the point, as the only road stuck to the coastline. In addition it was difficult at high tide to negotiate the rocks which were then submerged underwater. An 1863 survey map shows that the road left the coastline at Foote St. and passed over the brow of the "Nose". Georgiana McCrae gave an account in her journal of Meyrick, in 1845, solving the problem by sleeping next to his bullock wagon as he waited for the tide to go out. Her diary also recorded various fishing expeditions at Anthony's Nose made by her husband, his employees, her sons, and the Boon wurrung Aboriginal locals who were the first custodians of that area.

== Development of Nepean Highway ==
Over the years, the original escarpment was cut back to a cliff face. In the early 1920s, Anthony's Nose was further cut back by Mr Alnutt, an engineer who was contracted to finish the job in order to build Point Nepean Road, today known in parts as Nepean Highway.

== Geological features ==
Colin McLear, a descendant of one of the pioneering families on the Mornington Peninsula speculated that the water washed stones that are visible today in the man made cutting were either formed from water action in a riverbed (as on the Hudson River) or on a wave washed shore. He commented that before 1940 when a seawall was built around the "nose", "the shoreline there was thickly littered with water-washed stones." He was intrigued with both these theories as Port Phillip Bay was at one time a vast plain cut by the Yarra River where it may have joined the ocean near the present day Rye. The rocks underlying Arthur's Seat are Dromana granite, and the granite is bounded to the west by the Selwyn Fault.
