= South Channel Pile Light =

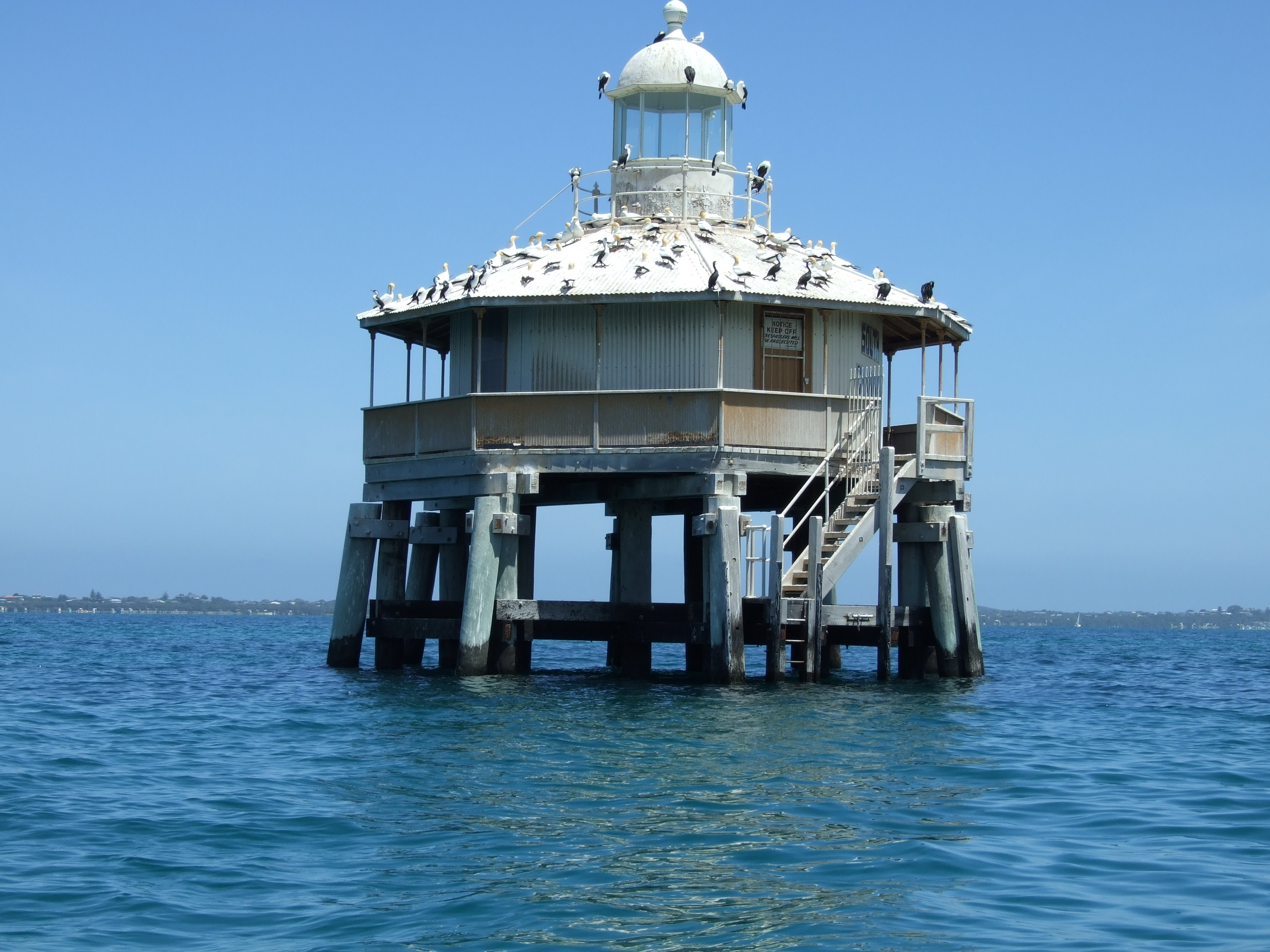
- South Channel Pile Light
- Location: Port Phillip Bay; Victoria; Australia
- Coordinates: 38°18.3′S 144°45.4′E

Tower
- Constructed: 1874
- Foundation: wooden piles
- Construction: wooden tower
- Automated: 1925
- Height: 9 metres (30 ft)
- Shape: octagonal prism keeper's quarter with balcony around and lantern on the roof
- Markings: white lighthouse and golden balcony
- Operator: Port of Melbourne Authority
- Heritage: listed on the Victorian Heritage Register

Light
- First lit: 1874
- Deactivated: 1985
- Focal height: 9 metres (30 ft)
- Light source: acetylene
- Range: 2 nmi (3.7 km; 2.3 mi)
- Characteristic: Fl W 3s

The South Channel Pile Light is a single-storey octagonal lighthouse in Port Phillip, Victoria, Australia.

It was built between 1872 and 1874 to guide ships through the narrow South Channel and was occupied by lighthouse keepers until 1925. The light ceased operation in 1985, having operated as a navigational beacon for 111 years, and fell into an era of neglect and vandalism. The structure was restored by Parks Victoria in 1998 in accordance with Heritage Victoria guidelines and relocated three kilometres off the coast of Rye Beach.

The site is listed in the Victorian Heritage Register.

== See also ==
- Chinaman's Hat (Port Phillip)
- West Channel Pile Light
- List of lighthouses in Australia
