= Queen of the Netherlands (ship) =

Dutch trailing suction hopper dredger ship

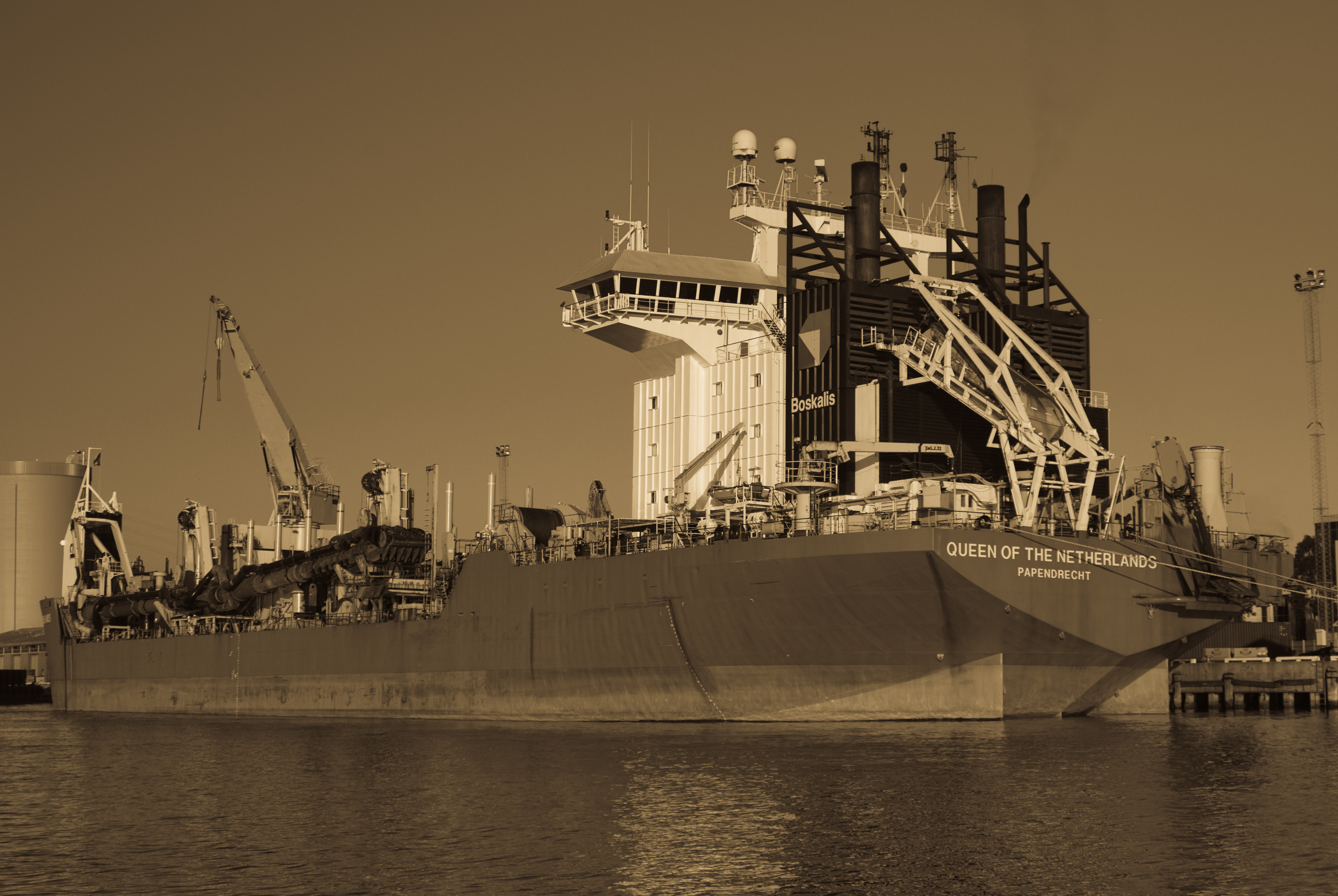
- Queen of the Netherlands docked at the Port of Melbourne

History
- Name: Queen of the Netherlands
- Namesake: Beatrix of the Netherlands
- Owner: Royal Boskalis
- Port of registry: Limassol, Cyprus
- Builder: Verolme Scheepswerf, Heusden, Netherlands (1998); Keppel, Singapore (Lengthened 2009)
- Laid down: 1998
- Launched: 1998
- Identification: Call sign: 5BGT2; IMO number: 9164031; MMSI number: 210138000
- Status: In service

General characteristics
- Tonnage: 33,423 GT
- Displacement: 82600t
- Length: 230.71 m (756 ft 11 in) LOA; 225 m (738 ft 2 in) LBP
- Beam: 32 m (105 ft 0 in)
- Height: 56.14 m (184 ft 2 in)
- Draught: 10.387 m (34 ft) (summer); 16.85 m (55 ft) (dredging)
- Depth: 15.90 m (52 ft) (fwd); 16.85 m (55 ft) (aft)
- Decks: 9
- Ice class: 1A (out of class)
- Installed power: 27,634 kW (37,058 hp)
- Propulsion: Wärtsilä 12V46C 12,600 kW (16,900 hp) @ 500 rev/min x2 & Wärtsilä 1,900 kW (2,500 hp) @ 1000 rev/min Aux & Wärtsilä 467 kW (626 hp) @ 1500 rev/min & Wärtsilä 2,650 kW (3,550 hp) @ 550 rev/min bow thruster
- Speed: 16.7 knots (30.9 km/h; 19.2 mph)
- Capacity: 35,500 m^{3} (1,253,671 cu ft)
- Crew: 46 + surveyors, clients & passengers

Queen of the Netherlands is a Dutch trailing suction hopper dredger ship constructed in 1998. After lengthening in 2009, she was the largest and most powerful dredger in the world. The vessel has been used in high-profile salvage and dredging operations including the investigation into the Swissair Flight 111 crash and in the Port Phillip Channel Deepening Project. It has been called "the world's largest floating vacuum cleaner".

== Capability ==
The ship's dragheads are 6 metres (19.7 ft) wide and can dredge between 55 metres (180 ft) and 160 metres (520 ft) deep. The ship has three hopper discharge options of pumping ashore by pipeline, dumping through bottom doors or rainbowing. The ship has equipment to dredge almost any material; such as clay, silt, sand and rock. During the Swissair Flight 111 salvage operation, a mixture of sea water, silt and aircraft pieces was pumped out of the Atlantic Ocean. The ship assisted in the recovery of nearly 98% of the aircraft, with over 144,698 kilograms (319,004 lb) of aircraft and cargo pieces salvaged. The pump room onboard has two 6,000 kW (8,000 hp) dredge engines that can be used in series or in parallel with the vessels two 1,200-millimetre-diameter (3.9 ft) suction pipes or combined with a submerged outboard pump. The vessel also has three 1,000 kW (1,300 hp) jet water pumps that are used to agitate subsea material whilst trailing, collapse and liquify hopper cargo for pumping or degassing natural air pockets in the seabed using the Venturi effect.

== Projects ==
Queen of the Netherlands has worked on various projects in Singapore, Daya Bay in China, port construction in Busan South Korea, Dubai, the Port Phillip Channel Deepening Project in Australia and island creation / Rasmale' projectThe Maldives. She has a sister ship called Fairway, which, like Queen of the Netherlands was also lengthened for land reclamation projects in the Far East. The ship has caused controversy in Australia, sparking protests.
