= West Channel Pile Light =

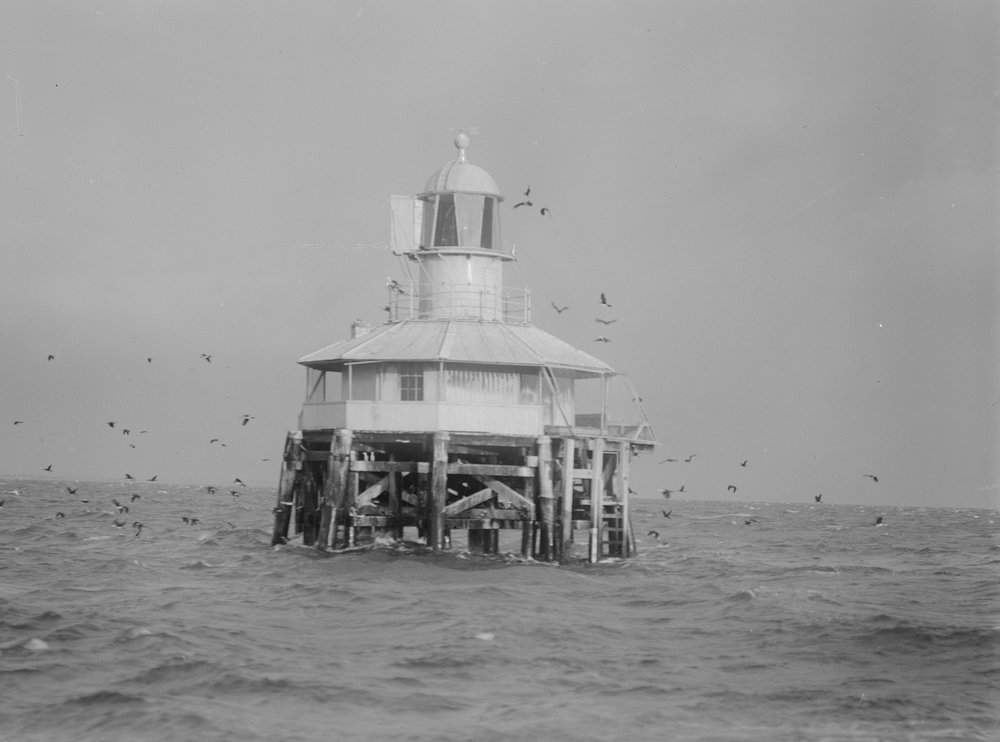
- West Channel Pile Light, first half of the 20th century
- Location: Port Phillip; Victoria; Australia
- Coordinates: 38°11′34″S 144°45′23″E

Tower
- Constructed: 1881
- Foundation: wooden piles
- Construction: wooden tower
- Height: 11 metres (36 ft)
- Shape: 1-story octagonal prism keeper's quarter with balcony around and lantern on the roof
- Markings: white lighthouse
- Power source: solar power
- Heritage: Victorian Heritage Register

Light
- First lit: 1881
- Focal height: 11 metres (36 ft)
- Characteristic: Fl WR 6s.

The West Channel Pile Light is an active two-storey octagonal lighthouse in Port Phillip, Victoria, Australia. It was built in 1881, replacing a lightship installed in 1854, to mark the north-east end of the West Sand. The site is listed in the Victorian Heritage Register.

== See also ==
- Chinaman's Hat (Port Phillip)
- South Channel Pile Light
- List of lighthouses in Australia
