= Victorian National Parks Association =

The Victorian National Parks Association (VNPA) is the an independent, not-for-profit nature conservation organisation in the Australian state of Victoria. The VNPA's vision is for Victoria to be a place with a diverse and healthy natural environment that is protected, respected and enjoyed by all.

Since 1952, the VNPA has been helping shape the agenda for creating and managing national parks, conservation reserves and other natural areas across land and sea. The VNPA works with all levels of government, scientists and the community to achieve long-term, best-practice environmental outcomes. It also provides opportunities for the community to enjoy and learn about nature through its bushwalking and activities program and citizen science programs NatureWatch and ReefWatch.

== History ==
The Victorian National Parks Association was formed in 1952 when Victoria had 13 national parks but did not have any legislation governing these parks. As of 2007, Victoria had 52 national parks (including 13 marine national parks), 30 state parks, three wilderness parks, and 11 marine sanctuaries protected under the National Parks Act 1975 (No. 8702). The expansion of the state's parks has led to VNPA encouraging the state government and other private entities to provide additional funding for the conservation of these areas.

== Campaigns ==
- Campaigning for new parks: Central West – Almost 60,000 hectares of forest and woodlands in Victoria's Central West could be protected in new national parks following the Victorian Environmental Assessment Council recommendations released in June 2019.
- Protecting the integrity of national parks – VNPA is working to stop inappropriate private and commercial use of national parks and conservation reserves, and speak to the value of the parks service, Parks Victoria, and their need for more funding. VNPA also responds to a range of park management plans, infrastructure plans and strategies to protect the integrity of the conservation estate.
- Tackling the feral problem – VNPA's response to deer and feral horse management is ongoing. VNPA keeps pushing for an integrated, state-wide, adequately-resourced program to manage deer.
- Critically endangered grasslands – VNPA is calling for an urgent examination of how to prioritise acquisition, protection and management of highest quality remaining conservation areas to protect this most threatened of ecosystems.
- Flora and Fauna Guarantee Act 1988 – VNPA is considering how to use the refreshed tools available in the updated Act to achieve more conservation action for threatened species.
- Bushfire response – VNPA has made submissions to both the state and national bushfire inquiries, including the national Bushfires Royal Commission. The damage caused by the fires makes protecting unburnt areas across the state increasingly critical.
- NatureWatch – The VNPA's NatureWatch citizen science program has delivered a series of "Caught on Camera" wildlife monitoring seasons, compiling a mass of data for the Bunyip State Park and Wombat State Forest.
- Protecting our seas and shores – VNPA continues to monitor how the final Marine and Coastal Policy is implemented.
- ReefWatch – ReefWatch is a citizen science program led by VNPA that includes the Sea Slug Census events.
- Wild Families – The Wild Families Program supports families to have adventures in nature, where both children and adults learn together.
- The allocation of more lands for logging in the Murray River region, during which VNPA encouraged the government to reconsider its forestry policy (2008) amid concerns that the wetlands could be lost forever.
- The desire to end cattle grazing in Alpine National Park in 2004, which was protested by a number of cattlemen who took their cause to the federal government in Canberra in 2005. This case has garnered national attention due to the desire to have the Australian Alps listed as a World Heritage site.
- The banning of oil and gas exploration in all marine national parks in Victoria in 2004.
- The campaign for the preservation of a united Point Nepean, although the traditional owners ultimately went for another group's plan. Despite this, it is expected that a portion of the area will be declared a national park within the next several years.

== See also ==
- Conservation in Australia
