= Fort Gellibrand =

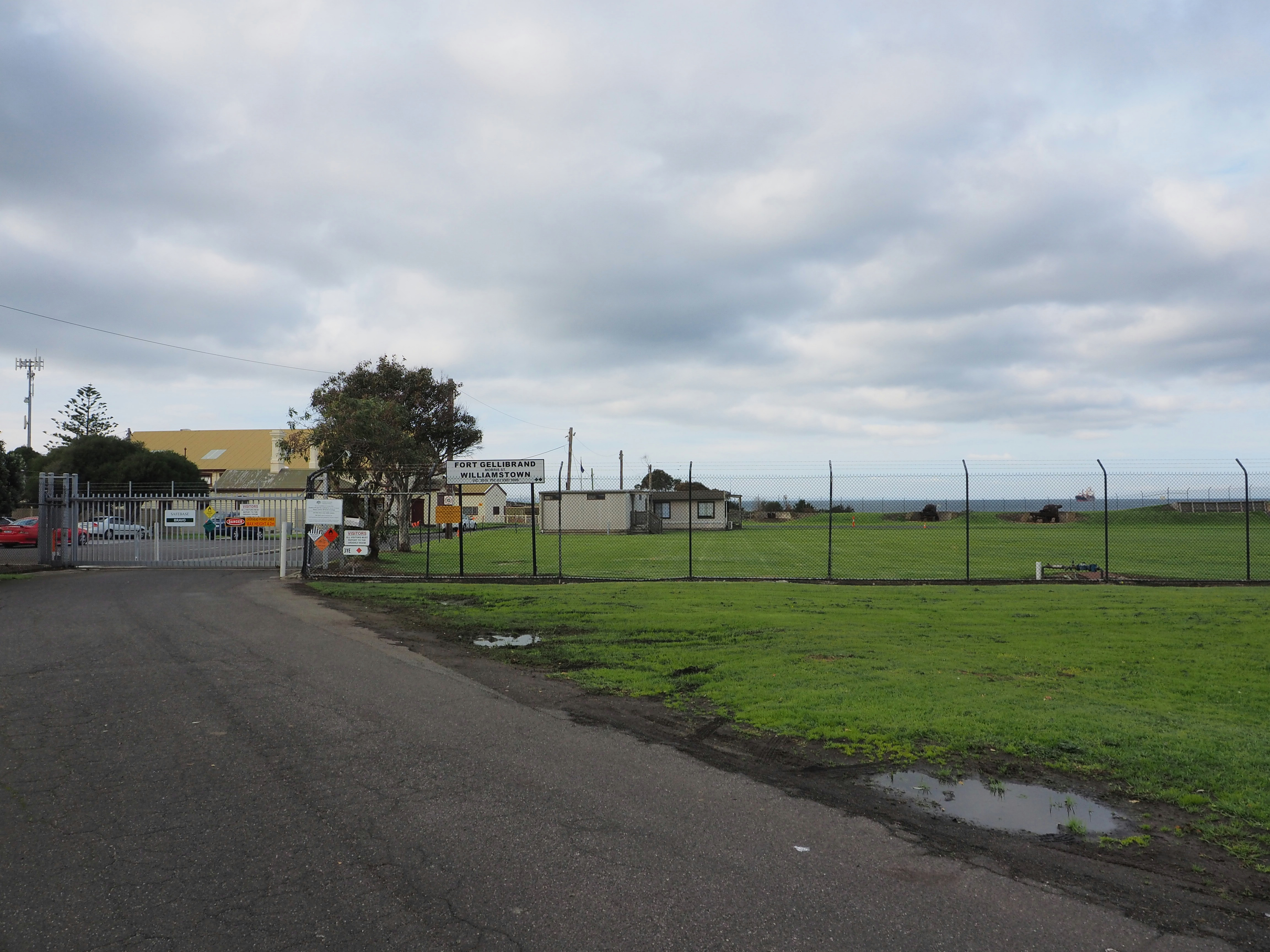

- Location within Victoria
- 37.8694°S 144.9061°E
- Location: Morris Street, Williamstown, Victoria, Australia

Commonwealth Heritage List
- Official name: Fort Gellibrand Commonwealth Area
- Type: Listed place (Historic)
- Designated: 22 June 2004
- Reference no.: 105615

Fort Gellibrand is a heritage-listed military installation at Morris Street, Williamstown, Victoria, Australia. It was added to the Australian Commonwealth Heritage List on 22 June 2004.

== Historic structures ==
The Fort can be divided into three precincts: the north-west area which consists mostly of the main buildings, the central-eastern section consisting of the gun emplacements and magazines, and the south-west area which is largely open space and the parade ground. Following are descriptions of the significant structures on the site.

The Drill Hall (Building 1) was erected in 1884 by George Farnworth, to a design by the Public Works Department. It is weatherboard, with a gable roof, twelve-pane sash windows, and an entrance porch. Internally there is the main hall typical of these buildings, offices, mess rooms and storerooms. The building was extended in 1936. Of particular interest is the accompanying residence (possibly built for a caretaker) which is rare or possibly unique in Victoria. Single storey, it has weatherboard walls, a gabled roof, verandah, a corbelled chimney, twelve-pane sash windows, and has been extended to the east with a skillion roof. Internally, the residence has been re-lined with masonite and sheet plaster ceilings. Doors and mantelpiece are original. The buildings have associations with the militia and, since it was built, the drill hall has served as the formal and administrative focus of the Fort. It is also one of the earliest surviving structures at the Fort, and is one of only two surviving in the Port Phillip Bay defences (the other being Monash Hall at Fort Queenscliff).

The Mess (3) was built in the 1920s and relocated in the 1940s. It is timber-framed, corrugated iron clad, built on timber stumps, and has a gabled roof and hopper windows. The interior is lined with masonite.

The Quartermaster's Store Building (5), dates from 1942 and was formerly the Inspection Building, built for testing anti-aircraft guns. It is just about the largest structure in the Fort and has a timber frame, a sawtoothed roof, and the original corrugated fibro cladding has been replaced with corrugated galvanised iron. Internally, the trussed roof framing is supported on riveted steel columns, there is a hardwood floor, original gantry cranes and some partitioned offices. The building has an association with the conversion of the Fort to a proof range.

The former Gun Shed (6) was converted from an earlier relocated building in 1938. It has an association with the Second World War, and is timber-framed, gabled, weatherboard, has an iron roof, and has been much modified.

Office Building (7) was built in the 1940s. It is timber-framed, with a gabled modern steel multideck roof, and the walls are weatherboard to dado level and fibro sheet above. Windows are double-hung sashes. It has an association with the Second World War.

The former Artillery and Side Arms Store (8) dates from 1907. It is clad with weatherboard and has a gable roof now clad with steel multideck. Internally there are bracketed truss frames, and lining boards to walls and ceiling. The floor is concrete. Built to a Commonwealth Department of Home Affairs design, the building is an early one on the site.

The former Artillery Store (9) is the only above ground building dating from the 1860s to survive at Fort Gellibrand. It was designed by Scratchley. Walls are coursed, rock-faced bluestone and the gabled roof is clad with modern multideck steel. The east window has hinge brackets which would have supported shutters. There is a modern concrete floor. Above the false ceiling there is tongue and groove boarding. The Store is the only such building to survive at any of the Port Phillip Bay defences.

The General Store (10) was built in 1940. Walls are cavity brick and the hipped roof has had its original corrugated fibro cladding replaced by steel multideck. Windows are original. The building was used as a laboratory in connection with the Artillery Proof Range.

The Side Arms Store (11) is a 1940 building built of brick and with a gable roof. There are concrete lintels and vertical timber-boarded doors. The earlier corrugated fibro roof has been replaced with steel multideck. Flooring is concrete and the ceiling is ripple iron. Windows are double-hung sashes. This building is associated with the Artillery Proof range.

The former Heating Chamber (12) was erected in 1938 as a heating chamber for testing ammunition. It was connected to the Boiler House (21) which supplied the heat. It bears some similarities to magazines at Footscray and Maribyrnong munitions factories but its function was almost unique. The building is brick and the original windows are multi-pane. There is an insulating double roof structure; the hipped corrugated fibro outer roof is now steel multideck, and the inner roof is believed to be intact. A lightning conductor is intact. The ceiling is fibro and walls are plastered, and the heating chamber is substantially intact.

The Boiler House was built in the same year and is brick with a hipped roof. It is connected to the Heating Chamber via a pipe duct. The original coke hopper is extant at the rear.

Store Building (18) was built some time between 1942 and 1950. It is brick, with a gabled roof.

The Sick Bay (24) is the former Temporary Married Quarters and dates from 1942, giving it associations with the Second World War. It has a timber frame and is clad with metal. The roof is skillion and the building stands on a concrete plinth. Internally, there is hardwood lining, and jarrah tongue and groove flooring. The fitout of the sick bay was done during the 1950s.

The Splinter-proof Shelter (27) dates from 1938 to 1942 and is a concrete bunker. It is associated with the Artillery Proof Range.

The Old Magazine (29) may date from the 1860s and is an underground structure constructed of soft handmade bricks and bluestone, and the floor is asphalt. The magazine is probably one of the earliest surviving structures at Fort Gellibrand.

The Parade Ground and Memorial (30) has been in its present position since the 1960s. It is a large asphalt area with a memorial cairn at the southern end with a flagpole. The memorial is dedicated to members of No.2 Commando Company who have been killed during training.

The Observation Platform (31) was built between the late 1930s and the early 1940s and is concrete, accessed by a concrete stair. It is located on an extension of the gun emplacement earthworks and was built as part of the Artillery Proof Range.

The Observation Shelter (32) dates from about 1942 and was built as part of the Artillery Proof Range.

The Infantry Parapet (33) dates from the 1860s-70s and is constructed of squared, uncoursed stepped bluestone with a capping of brick. It is located between two gun batteries.

Gun emplacements G1, G2, G3 and G4 are on state land and thus outside the Commonwealth boundary (but are within Fort Gellibrand Central Battery Precinct).

G5 is a gun emplacement with pump chamber dating from 1889. It is built of mass concrete and has timber joinery. There are three main shelter recesses and several minor ones. The present gun mount has 20 outer and 10 inner bolts; evidence of the original mounting for the disappearing gun can be seen in the paving. To the side is the pump chamber (which held the pumping apparatus for the hydro-pneumatic or disappearing gun) and it has shell recesses and a vaulted roof. Doors are tongue and groove boards with metal sheeting over. The emplacement was built by G.Beauchamp to house a 5" breech-loading 3 ton gun.

G6 is a gun emplacement and magazine also dating from 1889. The emplacement is concrete and the magazine is underground. The magazine has two chambers, plus an ante chamber and a perimeter lamp pasage. Alterations were made in the early twentieth century, and in 1941 a new concrete staircase and entry was constructed. This emplacement, built to house a 6-pounder quick-firing gun with balanced pillar mount, was also built by Beauchamp, and like G5 involved the demolition of an earlier emplacement.

G7 is a mass concrete gun emplacement and pump chamber, again dating from 1889. The embrasure has three main shelter recesses and several minor ones, and the emplacement was designed for a 5-inch breech-loading 3 ton disappearing gun. A non-original 20 bolt mounting is in the emplacement. The size and location of the original gun mounting is visible in the paving. Built of concrete and cement rendered is the pump chamber which is to the north of the emplacement and it housed the pump which raised and lowered the gun. Many of the chamber's internal features survive, for example timber linings to shell enclosures, and the concrete floor. The roof is vaulted.

G8 is the remains of a gun emplacement dating from 1861. Only part of the earth mound remains; the emplacement housed a 9-inch rifled muzzle loading gun in 1889, and in 1861 it had housed a 68-pounder gun.

As the site has been subject to redevelopment since the 1860s, it is probable that historic archaeological remains that are important relics of the history and evolution of the Fort, additional to elements referred to above, are also present.

Fort Gellibrand is the only surviving substantial remnant of the original Hobsons Bay defence system. With the other surviving Port Phillip Bay defences, Fort Queenscliff, Swan Island, South Channel Fort, Fort Nepean, Fort Pearce, and Fort Franklin, Fort Gellibrand is a part of the system created in the nineteenth century to protect the Victorian capital.

The general condition of the historic structures are fair to good, although a number of buildings have been demolished in the past. In 1993 the Drill Hall was reported to be in good condition, the former Gun Shed had been much modified, the former Artillery Store had been damaged by sand-blasting and had been heavily re-pointed, the Infantry Parapet was in poor condition, and the gun emplacements were generally in good and intact condition, although some alterations had been made to G6. Since then various conservation projects have been completed. (October 2002)

== Heritage listing ==
Fort Gellibrand, developed from the 1860s onward, is the only substantial surviving remnant of the original Hobsons Bay defence system, constructed as part of the scheme for the defence of Melbourne during the nineteenth century. In conjunction with the other fortifications around Port Phillip Bay, Fort Gellibrand is important as an element in defence planning of the time. Additionally, the artillery training phase and the weapons testing phase at the Fort reflect changed defence priorities during the late nineteenth and twentieth centuries.

The site is especially important as it contains evidence from the first phase of development of the Port Phillip Bay defences. Further, the Drill Hall, as well as being a good example of its type, is one of only two drill halls surviving in the Port Phillip Bay defences. The hall's residence is very rare. The former Artillery Store is the only one to exist at any of the Port Phillip Bay forts, and its rarity value is heightened by the fact that it was designed by (then Captain) Peter Scratchley. The Heating Chamber Building also is very rare and illustrates distinctive technological requirements at the Fort. The gun emplacements and associated structures reflect developments in the design of defences and ordnance.

Contained within the site are important examples of defence buildings and other structures and areas constructed during the late nineteenth and twentieth centuries. These include the Drill Hall and Residence, Mess, Quartermaster's Store, former Gun Shed, Offices, former Artillery and Side Arms Store, former Artillery Store, General Store, Side Arms Store, former Heating Chamber Building, Boiler House, Store, Sick Bay, Splinter Proof Shelter, Old Magazine, Parade Ground, Observation Platform and Shelter, Infantry Parapet and four Gun Emplacements with some accompanying Pump Chambers and Magazines. The original and early fabric in these places contributes to the significance, as do the spaces around the places. (Criterion D.2)

Fort Gellibrand has additional significance for its association with Lieutenant Colonel Peter Scratchley and Colonel Sir William Jervois. Both of these officers played important roles in colonial defence planning in the latter part of the nineteenth century.
