= Point Nepean Quarantine Station =

Former military site in Victoria, Australia

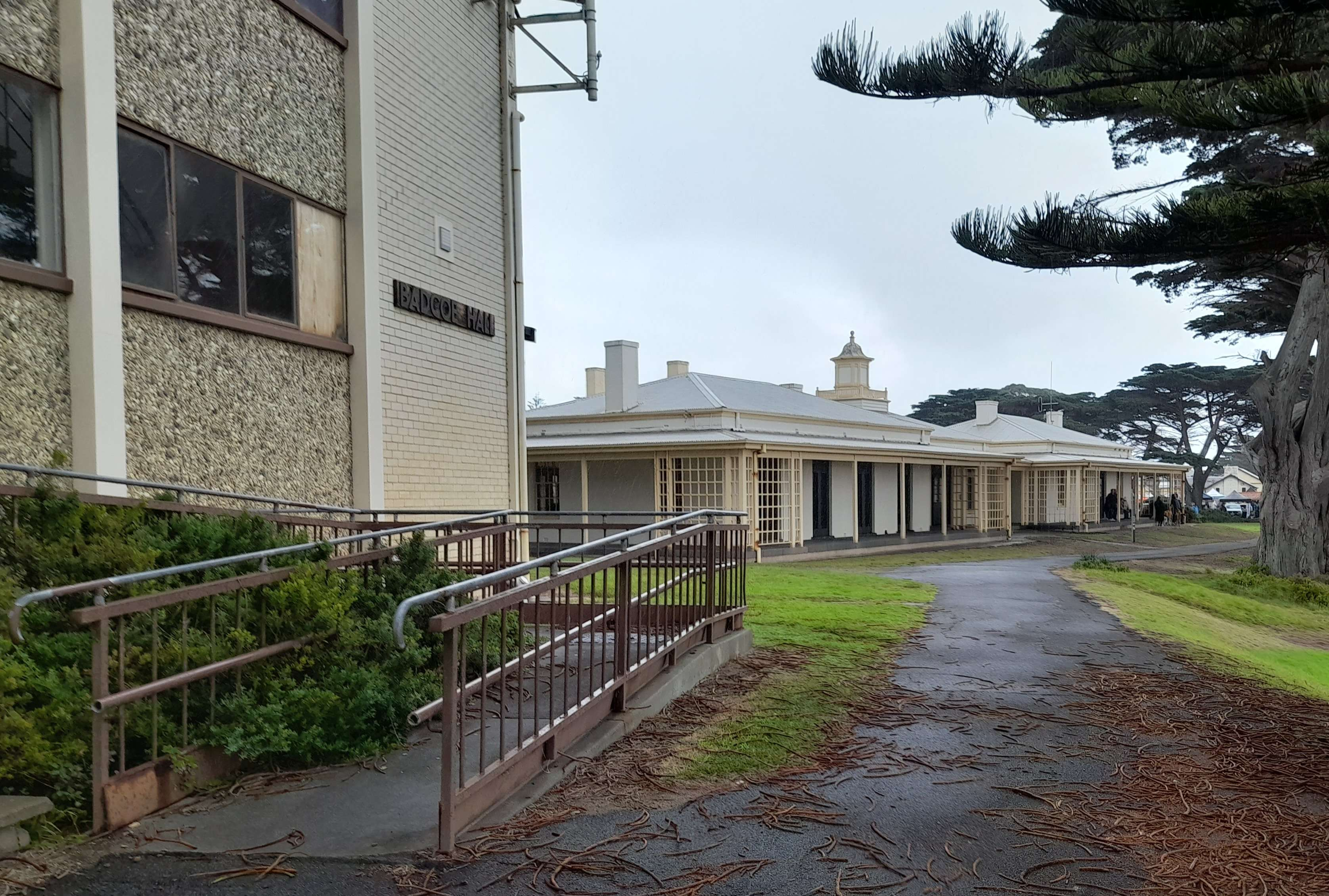
- The administration building viewed from outside Badcoe Hall

- Location of the site in Greater Metropolitan Melbourne
- Interactive map of the Point Nepean Quarantine Station area
- Former names: Sanitary Station (1852–1880s)

General information
- Status: Completed
- Type: Quarantine station
- Architectural style: Old Colonial; Victorian
- Location: Coleman Road, Portsea, Mornington Peninsula, Melbourne, Victoria, Australia
- Coordinates: 38°18′47″S 144°41′45″E
- Completed: 1852; 174 years ago
- Closed: 1980 (as a quarantine station)
- Owner: Colony of Victoria (1852–1908); Australian government (1908–2009); Victorian government (since 2009)

Technical details
- Material: Timber; wattle and daub; limestone; weatherboard; red bricks
- Grounds: 526 ha (1,300 acres)

Design and construction
- Architects: Alfred Scurry; John Smith Murdoch
- Main contractor: Public Works Department

Website
- park.vic.gov.au

Site notes
- Management: Parks Victoria; as Point Nepean National Park

Australian National Heritage List
- Official name: Point Nepean Defence Sites and Quarantine Station Area
- Type: Historic
- Designated: 16 June 2006
- Reference no.: 105680

Victorian Heritage Register
- Official name: Point Nepean Defence and Quarantine Precinct
- Type: Registered place
- Designated: 22 July 2004
- Reference no.: H2030
- Heritage overlay no.: HO165
- Categories: Cemeteries and Burial Sites; Farming and Grazing; Health Services; Manufacturing and Processing; Military; National Heritage Process Group

Register of the National Estate
- Official name: Point Nepean Quarantine Station (former)
- Type: Defunct register
- Designated: 26 April 1988
- Reference no.: 103718

The Point Nepean Quarantine Station is a former quarantine station and former military training facility, located on approximately 526 hectares (1,300 acres), on Coleman Road in Portsea, on the Mornington Peninsula, in the south eastern suburbs of Melbourne, in Victoria, Australia.

It was established as a quarantine station in 1852, on the traditional lands of the Bunurong people, following the arrival of the clipper Ticonderoga at the heads of Port Phillip with a significant number of passengers with scarlet fever. It ceased operation as a quarantine station in 1980, and was used by the military as an Officer Cadet School from the 1950s until 1985.

Over the years, the site has been added to various statutory heritage registers, including the Australian National Heritage List on 16 June 2006, and the Victorian Heritage Register on 22 July 2004 in recognition of its archaeological, aesthetic, architectural, historical, scientific and social significance; and to non-statutory lists by the Victorian branch of the National Trust on 30 April 1970 and the now defunct Register of the National Estate on 26 April 1988.

The site is used for weekend markets and similar events and is part of the Point Nepean National Park. There is a shuttle bus to Fort Nepean that terminates at the quarantine station, as well as bicycles for rent to ride around the park. The site has been managed by Parks Victoria since c. 2009.

== History ==
=== 19th century ===
A quarantine station was established at Sydney's North Head in 1832 to preserve the colony's lack of European diseases, specifically cholera. New South Wales quarantine laws were carried over into Victorian law after separation. The Port Phillip District set up a quarantine station at Point Ormond, and later Hobsons Bay, in the 1840s. Immigration to Victoria increased when gold was found in the north-west, and the requirement for a proper quarantine station became more important.

Point Nepean was selected as the site for a new quarantine, and the colonial government assigned £5,000 for a 'sanatorium'. At the time, the site was being leased by Patrick Sullivan, the son of a settler, and William Cannon, both of whom were involved in lime burning. The site already had several buildings built by Sullivan and Cannon, including a stone house, three wattle and daub structures, a dairy, and Cannon and Sullivan's Lime Kilns. In October 1852, Governor La Trobe and General Surveyor Robert Hoddle found that Sullivan and Cannon's leases ended that year and, upon expiry, their leases were not renewed.

In November, less than a month later, the Ticonderoga sailed through the heads with almost three hundred people on board with scarlet fever and typhus, and a further hundred dead. The ship departed from Liverpool, with 714 passengers and 48 crew. The news reached Melbourne within a day via Captain Wylie of the Champion, who had passed the Ticonderoga at the heads. Captain Charles Ferguson investigated and came back to Governor La Trobe on 9 November, reporting that Sullivan had been moved from the site and the passengers of the Ticonderoga had set up tents on the shore.

Sullivan and Cannon's buildings were used to house the sick, beginning the quarantine station. Ferguson found that many of the passengers happened to be stonemasons, and instructed them to build a storage building on the site, and suggested to La Trobe that a building be built for the healthy inhabitants of the quarantine station. It was officially referred to as the "Sanitary Station", until the 1880s, when "Quarantine Station" became more commonly used.

==== Limestone hospitals ====
Between 1852 and 1887, several buildings were proposed, half-constructed, and then left unfinished because of a lack of timber. This also saw many people buried without coffins. The hospital could house fifty patients, (and a further 450 in tents) which quickly became inadequate. Dr James Reed, resident doctor was denied an extension of the hospital by the government, as they wanted to build out the station through purpose and planning, as opposed to its rapid growth due to the Ticonderoga's emergency.

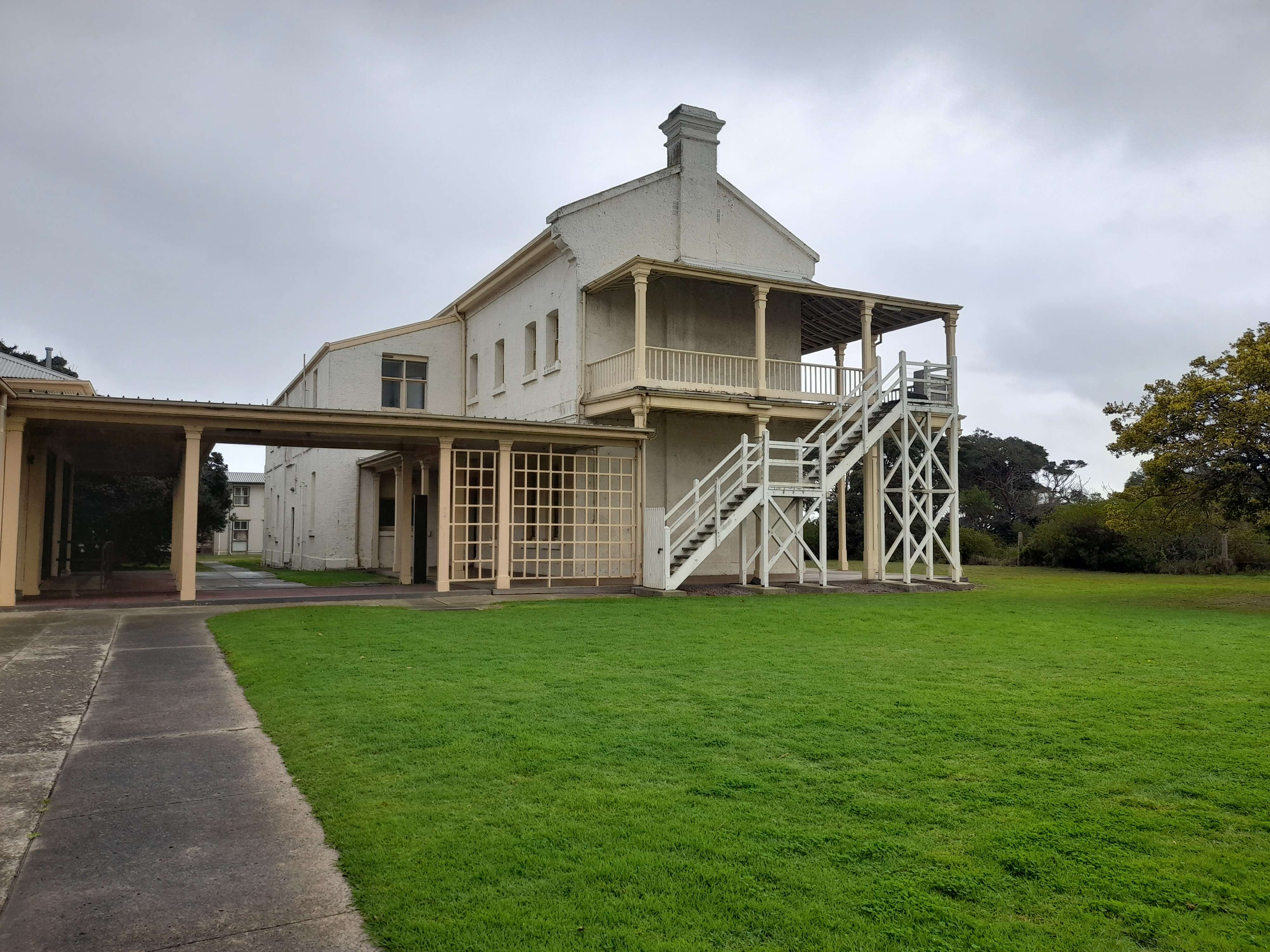
Limestone Hospital 2, built around 1859. The covered path to the dining hall is visible.

Between 1888 and 1889, five limestone buildings were constructed, which remain extant. Two were built on a hill as hospitals for the sick, while three were built in a line on the flat land to house healthy passengers. A pier and cookhouse were also constructed at this time. Soon after, the Tudor arrived with almost everyone on board sick. This tested the new buildings' capacity, but also brought a new issue. To prevent illness being spread through possessions, luggage and clothes were treated in boiling water, which upset the passengers, as much of their belongings had been ruined and their clothes shrunk. Dr Reed wrote in his report that a more effective, less destructive method of sanitation would be through an oven-like machine, but this would only be implemented forty years later.

Into the 1860s, there was a downturn in immigration as the gold rush subsided, also leading to a decrease in the colony's income. This, partnered with better hygiene on ships, cast doubt on the usefulness of the sanitary station and stalled construction of any new buildings – including the oven-like machine suggested by many doctors from the quarantine. The government conducted an inquiry into the quarantine station and found the conditions unsuitable. They considered relocation of the quarantine and repurposing the Portsea site for a mental asylum. The staff and Chief Medical Officer fought against this, but the resident doctor was dismissed, and staff numbers reduced to just two people. This meant the ship's surgeon would have to tend to the patients, once they reached shore, as there was no doctor. Toilets were added to the hospitals.

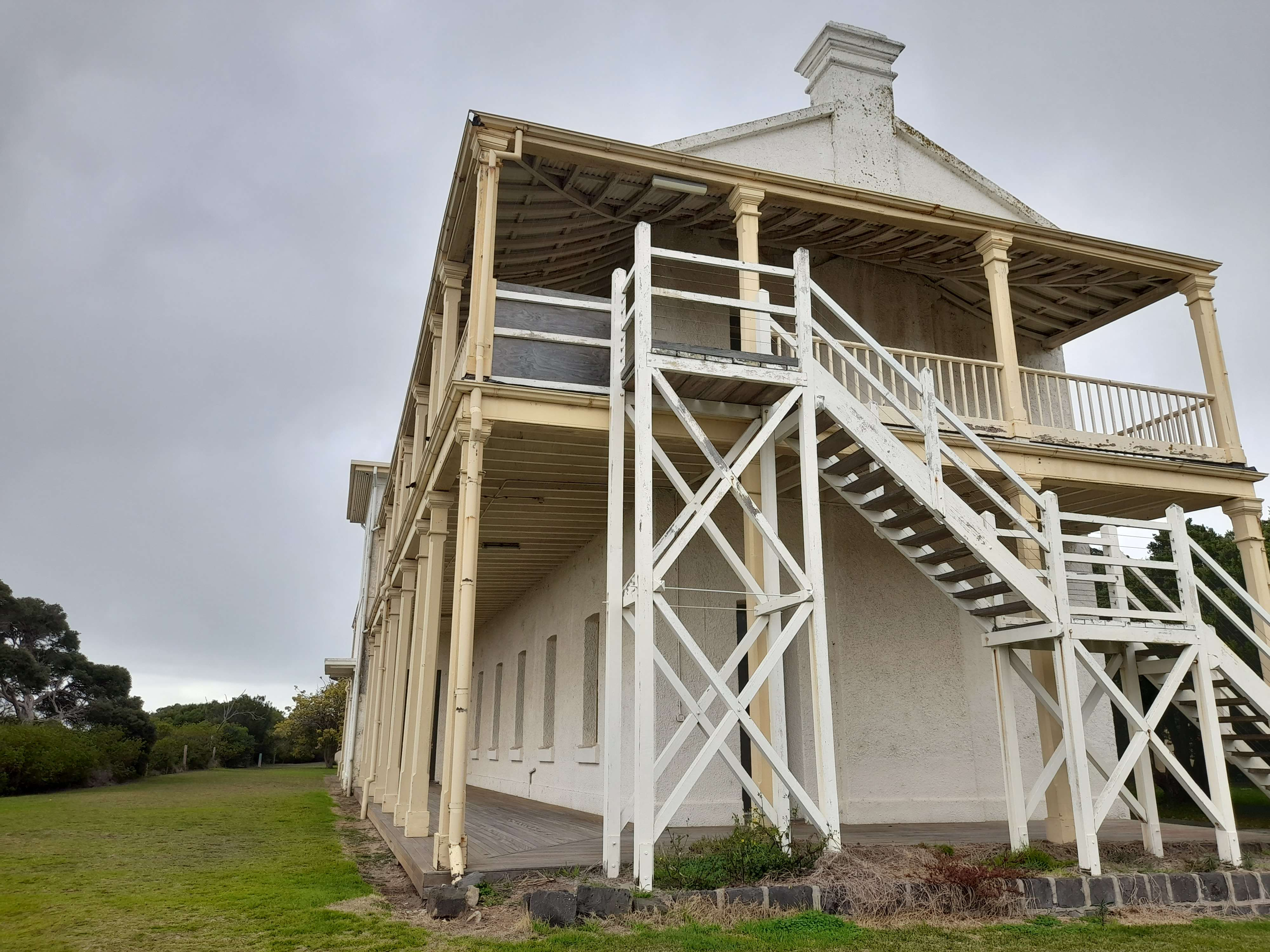
Hospital 2 from the west side

In 1870, the limestone buildings' uses were switched, so that the hill was used for first and second class, hospitals 3 and 4 on the flats were for steerage class, and the fifth was for isolated, sick patients. Telegraph communications were implemented in 1874. It was fenced off in 1890.

The hospital buildings of 1858-1859 are important examples of Early Colonial buildings, which are rare in Victoria, and the work of the Public Works Department architect, Alfred Scurry. The design of the administration building is an accomplished example of Victorian Colonial Revival architecture, with planning influences from noted architect, John Smith Murdoch CMG.

=== 20th century ===
Forty years after it was first suggested, Reed's disinfecting system was built in the early 1900s. A tramway was constructed to take luggage from the pier, into a sanitation chamber where they are heated, and out the other side. In this complex was also a bath house. At Federation, the quarantine was transferred to the Commonwealth government. A waiting room for healthy patients reboarding the ship was built in 1911, and the following year a weatherboard extension was added to Hospital 5, to house more sick patients.

1916 brought several new buildings to the quarantine station. A dining hall for first and second class was built on the hill, connecting to hospitals one and two. An administration building was constructed, including a post office and quarters for police and visiting staff. Stables were also built, using materials from a stable at Police Point (slightly closer to Portsea) and some sheds nearby.

The 1918–1920 flu pandemic pandemic brought new use for the quarantine station, and as such, several wooden "influenza huts" were hurriedly built for the influx of patients. These twelve2 huts, built over five weeks, processed 300 ships between 1918 and 1919 – returning World War I soldiers.

The last notable construction as a quarantine was the addition of a morgue to Hospital 5 in 1921.

The Point Nepean Quarantine Station continued use into World War II. In 1952, most of the former quarantine station site was repurposed into the Officer Cadet School. It ceased to operate as a quarantine station in 1980, and the Cadet School, School of Army Health, and other military uses persisted into the late 1990, as well as housing Kosovar refugees from the wars in the Balkans. Following a review of military training establishments in Australia in the mid-1980s, the officer cadet school was closed in 1985, as the Royal Military College, Duntroon, assumed sole responsibility for training Army officers.

It was declared part of the Point Nepean National Park in 2009, which now encompasses Police Point, Fort Nepean and Cheviot Beach, the site of Harold Holt's disappearance.

== Description ==
The site today is host to several community markets and shows, as well as being part of Point Nepean National Park, and has a private provider of bicycles and cycling equipment for visitors to ride around the park. On market days, parking is provided on Jarman Oval, adjacent to the quarantine station, but on non-event days, there is a permanent asphalt car park in the south, accessed off the one-way loop road system formed by Danson Drive, Defence Road and Ochiltree Road. Immediately to the east of the carpark is the stables, and behind some trees to the west are the influenza huts.

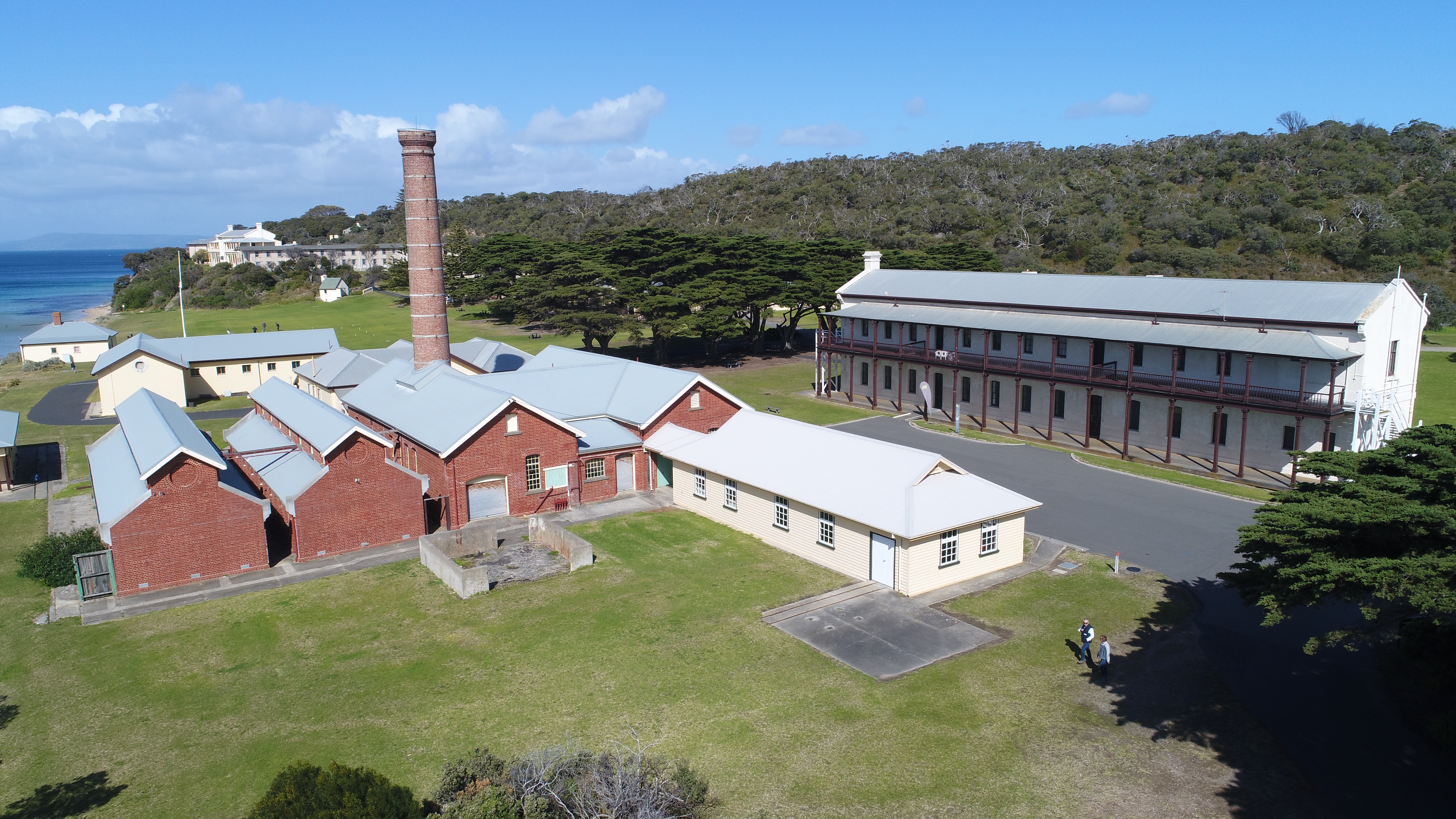
The sanitation buildings and Hospital 3 on the right

Upon entry from Jarman Oval, the isolation hospital and morgue is visible, north of the influenza huts. East of the isolation hospital are the three flat-land hospitals, Hospital 5, Hospital 4 and Hospital 3. Across Bogle Road from Hospital 3 is the 1900 red brick sanitation buildings, which are often open for the public to look inside. Toward the shore are the waiting room and the pier's remnants. This is the extent of the market grounds.

Further east is the parade ground and flagpole, used during the sites' military occupation for marching, although the green existed while it was still a quarantine. Across the parade ground is the administration building, which is the Point Nepean Information Centre. Next to the admin building is Badcoe Hall, named in honour of Peter Badcoe VC, who attended the Officer Cadet School, built in the 1960s by the Cadet school as a gymnasium.

Up the hill is Shepherd's Hut, which predates the quarantine station, built by the previous occupants. Two dilapidated 1960s buildings were built on the hill as accommodation for cadets. These are in significant disrepair. Beyond these lie the remaining two 1850s hospitals (H1 and H2), used for first and second class passengers. Attached to the hospitals is the dining hall, which was built in 1916 and split into two sections (for first and second class) with one kitchen between them. In the 1960s, the building was renovated and used as a mess hall, but are now closed due to asbestos concerns.

The eastmost buildings in the quarantine are the Medical Superintendent's quarters and Chief Officer's cottage. The former was built in 1899 for J. Couper Johnston. This portion of the quarantine station remained a quarantine station while the Australian Army used the remainder of the site. The house was used to isolate pregnant women during this period. The Chief Officer's cottage has temporary fence around it and is significantly smaller than the house across the path from it.

== See also ==
- Architecture of Melbourne
- History of public health in Australia
- List of places on the Victorian Heritage Register in the Shire of Mornington Peninsula
