= QF 14-pounder Maxim-Nordenfelt naval gun =

Ordnance QF 14-pounder
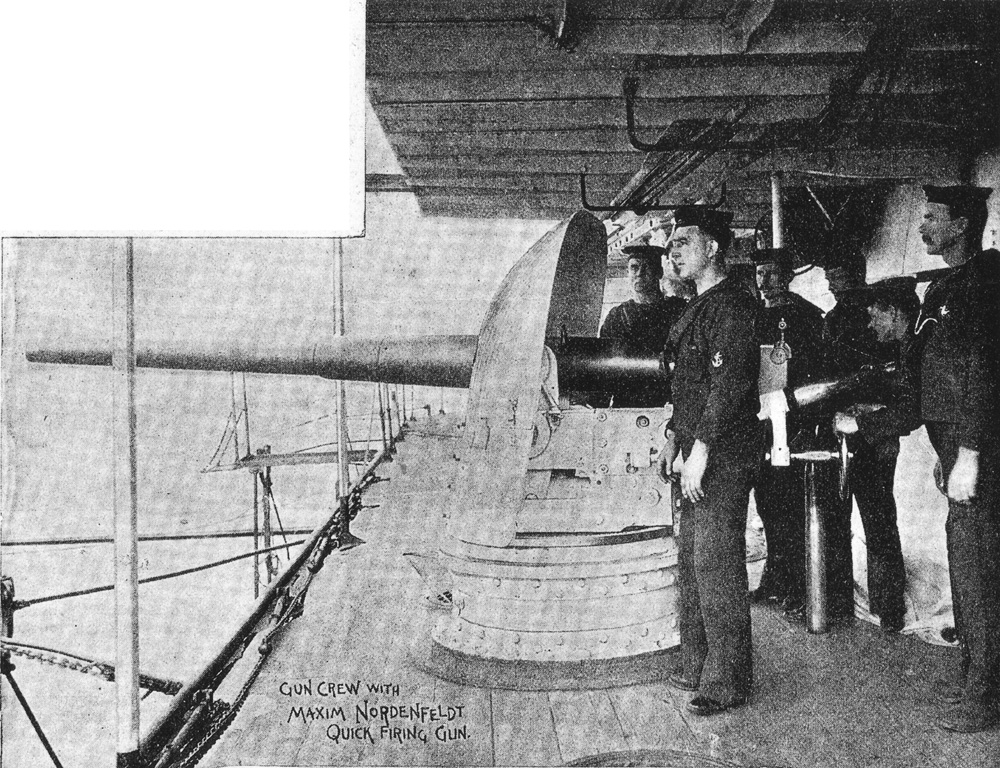
- On HMVS Cerberus circa. 1900. Note fixed-round cartridge with shell standing at gunner's feet in background. Photo courtesy of the Friends of the Cerberus
- Type: Naval gun
- Place of origin: United Kingdom

Service history
- In service: 1894-19??
- Used by: Various countries Victorian Naval Forces
- Wars: World War I

Production history
- Designed: 189?
- Manufacturer: Maxim-Nordenfelt

Specifications
- Mass: 1,638 pounds (743 kg)
- Barrel length: 135 inches (3.429 m)bore (45 calibres)
- Shell: separate QF 14 pounds (6.35 kg) or 12.5 pounds (5.67 kg)
- Calibre: 3-inch (76.2 mm)
- Muzzle velocity: 2,100 feet per second (640 m/s) (14 lb shell)
- Maximum firing range: 8,000 yards (7,320 m) (14 lb shell)

The QF 14-pounder was a 3-inch medium-velocity naval gun used to equip warships for defence against torpedo boats. It was produced for export by Maxim-Nordenfelt (later Vickers, Sons and Maxim) in competition with the Elswick QF 12-pounder 12 cwt and QF 12-pounder 18 cwt guns.

== Service ==
The gun equipped ships built in Britain for various foreign navies including Chile.

== Victorian Colonial Navy ==
In 1897, two guns were mounted on HMVS Cerberus, of the Colonial Navy of Victoria (Australia). In 1900, these guns were removed, mounted on field carriages and went to China with the Victorian Naval Contingent – a part of British forces in the Boxer Rebellion. These two guns were non-standard and fired QF fixed rounds (i.e. the cartridge was loaded with shell attached) unlike the standard guns which fired separate ammunition (i.e. shell and cartridge loaded as separate items). They were therefore left behind in China in favour of the standard QF 12-pounder.

In Victorian naval service in the 1890s the gun is reported as firing a shell weighing 14 lbs to a range of 8,000 yards with a muzzle velocity of 2100 ft/second, using a 6.5 lb black powder charge.

== Victorian coastal artillery ==
14-pounders were used for coastal defence at Fort Nepean, Fort Pearce and Fort Queenscliff.

== British ammunition ==
In British service the guns fired the same 3-inch 12.5 lb shell as QF 12-pounder guns.

Cordite Cartridges circa. 1905	Mk II Common pointed shell	Mk II & Mk III Common Lyddite shell	Mk IV Common Lyddite shell with internal night tracer, 1914

== See also ==
- List of naval guns
