= Ticonderoga (clipper) =

United States clipper ship, wrecked in 1849

History

United States
- Name: Ticonderoga
- Launched: 1849, Williamsburg, New York
- Fate: Wrecked off India, 1872

General characteristics
- Class & type: 4-masted clipper
- Displacement: 1089 tons
- Length: 169 ft (52 m)

Ticonderoga was a 169-foot (52 m), 4-masted clipper ship displacing 1,089 tons, launched in 1849 and wrecked in 1872.

== History ==
Ticonderoga was launched in 1849 at Williamsburg, New York (United States).

She was infamous for her "fever ship" voyage in 1852 from Liverpool (England) to Port Phillip, Victoria (Australia) carrying 795 passengers, arriving on 3 November 1852. It was a double-decker ship, overcrowded, and with more than her recommended load of 630. Many passengers were small children, as the restrictions on the number of children per family had been lifted. Most came from the Highlands of Scotland under the auspices of the Highland and Island Emigration Society, but there were other families from Somerset on board.

The ship was not designed well for passenger carrying: sanitary provisions were totally inadequate, and the surgeons were soon overwhelmed, and the senior surgeon, Dr Sanger, caught typhus leaving the junior surgeon on his first voyage to deal with hundreds of sick and dying people by himself, with supplies running dangerously low. The decks were never swabbed properly and there was no cleaning undertaken below decks; contemporary accounts mention the dreadful smell and the lack of sanitation. Bodies were bundled into mattresses in tens and thrown overboard during the voyage.

During the voyage, 100 passengers died of what was later determined to have been typhus. When the ship arrived in Port Phillip, flying the yellow flag, it was initially moored off Point Nepean. The headland became a makeshift a quarantine station, where many more passengers died and were buried, haphazardly, in shallow graves. In 1992, a memorial was erected at the site by descendants of the survivors.

After a press furore about the unsanitary conditions on the ship, double-decker ships were no longer used for emigrants and the restrictions on the numbers of children allowed were reinstated.

In 1872, Ticonderoga was wrecked off India.

Hell Ship, a history of the 1852 voyage of the Ticonderoga, was published in 2018 by actor and writer Michael Veitch, who also developed a one-person play based on it.
