= Highland and Island Emigration Society =

Defunct Scottish charitable society

Emigration from the Isle of Skye – HMS Hercules anchored at Campbeltown, Argyllshire. Departed 26 December 1852

The Highland and Island Emigration Society was a charitable society formed to promote and assist emigration as a solution to the Highland Potato Famine.

Between 1852 and 1857, it assisted the passage of around 5,000 emigrants from Scotland to Australia. The Society's work was both praised for providing a solution to the famine in Scotland, and criticised for providing landlords with an easy mechanism for the Highland Clearances.

== The formation of the Highland and Island Emigration Society ==
In 1846, the Highland Potato Famine caused a crisis in the Highlands and the islands of Western Scotland, an area already struggling with overpopulation and the upheavals of the Highland Clearances. The deaths from starvation were so high that, in 1848–1849, the government delivered shipments of oatmeal to locations along the western coast to give to starving families.

Relief measures were supervised by Sir John McNeill, himself a highlander. In 1846, in his role as chairman of the Board of Supervision for the New Poor Law of Scotland, he toured 27 of the most distressed parishes. As the famine continued, many, like McNeill, began to doubt that relief was a sustainable solution to the problem. His view was shared by others. For example, in Skye, one of the hardest hit areas, the local clan chief, Norman McLeod, bankrupted himself between 1846 and 1849 providing relief to his people. In 1849, he was obliged to leave Skye and move to London, working as a clerk earning three pounds a week. He became convinced that emigration was the only solution and eventually joined the London Committee of the Highland and Island Emigration Society. Similarly, Thomas Fraser, Sheriff Substitute of Skye, who had worked there since 1846 organizing relief, came to believe that emigration was the only hope.

In 1851, McNeill published a report to the Board of Supervision summarizing his views and proposing the "large-scale emigration of the 'surplus' population as the only way forward". This view was strongly shared by Sir Charles Trevelyan, Assistant Secretary to Her Majesty's Treasury in London. He saw emergency food supplies as a "useless palliative" and thought that emigration to Australia would provide the relief needed.

By April 1852, Trevelyan had founded the Highland and Island Emigration Society, with McNeill, following a meeting at the Freemasons' Tavern in Great Queen Street, Covent Garden. They had a strong and useful ally in Sir Thomas Murdoch, chairman of the Colonial Land and Emigration Commissioners. MacMillan attributes the success of the Society primarily to this powerful trio: Trevelyan and Murdoch for Treasury and Emigration, and McNeill as the chief administrator of Poor Relief in Scotland.

Despite having the appearance of an independent philanthropic organisation, the Society has been labelled a quasi-governmental organisation by historian Tom Devine. Evidence cited to support this view include the close involvement of senior civil servants in the Society, the Emigration Advances Act 1851 (14 & 15 Vict. c. 91) which provided loans to landlords to pay their share of emigration costs and all overseas mail from the Society using the Treasury's mail facilities. The existence of the Society allowed a course of action that would have cost more as a government operation and went against the ruling party's political ideology.

Skye was the area selected for the Society's first operations, with Australia as the ultimate destination. Australia was chosen because the Highlanders' experience as shepherds and cattle drovers would be valued there. By the time the Society closed, Skye was the origin of 59% of all its emigrants (59% = 2818 people). The next commonest starting points were Harris and a combined total for Mull and Iona - each providing 6% of the overall number.

== The rules of emigration ==
In its first pamphlet, published in May 1852, the Society set out its rules for emigrants:

1. The Emigration will be conducted, as much as possible, by entire families, and in accordance with the rules of the Colonial Land and Emigration Commissioners.
2. Passages to Australia are provided by the Commissioners, from Colonial funds, for able-bodied men and women of good character ... on production of a stated quantity and description of clothing, and on payment of a deposit ...
3. The Society will advance the sum necessary to make good whatsoever may be deficient for these purposes ... The emigrants will he required to repay to the Society the whole of the sums advanced to them, which will again be applied in the same manner as the original fund.
4. The owners or trustees of the properties from which the emigrants depart will be expected to pay one-third of the sum disbursed on account of the emigrants by the Society.

The last rule, which required landlords to partially fund the emigration of their tenants, has been criticized. Richards: "the operations of the ... Society were clouded by its allegiance with landlords wanting to divest themselves of small tenantry who were no longer economic". Prebble: "Helped by the Highland Emigration Society and by the Commissioners for emigration – the one finding the money and the other the ships – the lairds of the Isles were now clearing their estates with sickening haste."

== British Government support ==
The British Government provided funds through the Colonial Land and Emigration Commission. This was the agency that had already been tasked with sponsoring emigration to Australia, but which did not favour families, preferring to select young single adults. Trevelyan set about changing this policy, using his close association with the chair of the Commission, Sir Thomas Murdoch. The British Government also passed the Emigration Advances Act of 1951, which provided a mechanism for landlords to borrow money to pay their share of emigration costs. The provision of HMS Hercules by the Board of the Admiralty was at a lower cost than would be usual.

== Popular support for the emigration plan ==
"Scenes on board an Australian emigrant ship" from Illustrated London News in 1849

In 1852, popular support for emigration was widespread. The Society's pamphlet of May 1852 announced that its patron was Prince Albert and asked the public for donations. The list of benefactors included The Queen (£300), Prince Albert (105), three Scottish Dukes (£100 each), Members of Parliament, the Australian Agricultural Company, and numerous clergy. Yorkshire manufacturers, fearing a labour shortage affecting the supply of wool from Australia, were keen to subscribe large amounts to the Society.

The London Committee, which in addition to Trevelyan himself, included other influential individuals such as Thomas Baring, Baron Rothschild, and W. G. Prescott, Governor of the Bank of England, wrote personal letters to prominent Scots in Bombay, Calcutta and Madras asking for funds to help ...

this final effort to put an end to the misery that is breaking the spirit and degrading the character of our Highlanders, now that an absolute necessity of removing them has coincided with such an opportunity of providing for them elsewhere as never has, and perhaps never will, occur again.

Support also came from the governments in the various Australian colonies, including £3,000 from South Australia in 1853, and £3,000 from Tasmania in 1854, on condition that a certain number of emigrants were sent there.

== Criticism of the Society's emigration plan ==
The Society's emigration scheme was sometimes exploited by landlords, leading to some of the notorious forced evictions that figure in the history of the Highland Clearances. For example, in 1854, Donald Ross published a pamphlet entitled "Real Scottish Grievances" in which he describes some of the results of the activities of what he refers to as "a body calling itself the Highland and Island Emigration Society".

Trevelyan must have been aware of these incidents because many were widely reported. However, when a correspondent suggested that the emigration was being used to "facilitate the landlord's clearances", the Chairman replied "They will no doubt gain by the removal of the unemployed population, but the people will gain far more. This is essentially a popular movement."

Trevelyan's correspondence reveals a low opinion of the "Celtic race" (despite his own Cornish, and therefore Celtic, ancestry) that was not uncommon for the times. These views influenced the operation of the Society. According to Kent:

The active principles on which the Highland and Island Emigration Society was founded, and which it consistently espoused, were a mixture of liberal political economy, ill-disguised racism and a grudging form of charity.

The sometimes conflicted nature of the Society and its operations is reflected in MacMillan's comments on the nature of Trevelyan:

Trevelyan's own personality is enigmatic, with its undertones of racial prejudice and authoritarianism. He could defend his emigrants against the criticisms of Robert Lowe and the critics of his schemes in New South Wales, but he could also contemplate with satisfaction "the prospect of flights of Germans settling here in increasing numbers – an orderly, moral, industrious and frugal people, less foreign to us that the Irish or Scotch Celt, a congenial element which will readily assimilate with our body politic". He certainly believed that he was benefiting both Britain and the Highlanders, for he wrote on another occasion, "The Irish and Scotch, especially the latter, do much better when they have a fresh start in other countries, and become mixed up with other people, than when they stay at home".

== Operations ==
Page from HIES records summarising operations

Apart from being unusual in the way it funded emigrants, the Society was also unusual in the application of its first Rule – emigration by family. This was in contrast to the usual pattern of immigration at the time which was single men, couples, or small families. The families selected by the Land and Emigration Commissioner's agent in Scotland, acting on behalf of the Society, were extended, sometimes to three generations.

Families that satisfied the Society's criteria were selected and assigned a family number. Between 1852 and 1857, 29 ships carried 963 families sponsored by the Society, comprising around 5,000 emigrants.

The family-centred policy was slightly modified in 1853 when the Society sought to increase the proportion of single females. This met requests from Australian businesses and the colonial government. The Society's ability to meet this demand was used in negotiations with key individuals in Australia. The result was an increase in single females from 18% to about 25%.

Those selected to emigrate with the Society were the poorest from each community. The majority were not crofters, but cottars and squatters. Many had to be provided with clothing in order to leave their homes. Only in 1853 were better off applicants accepted, due to a shortage of those willing to emigrate in that year. The very poor were often those most reluctant to leave their homes and the slightest (and most temporary) of improvements in their circumstances would rapidly reverse any decision to go.

The voyages could be dangerous with passengers dying of typhus, scarlet fever and smallpox. For example, out of 615 immigrants (not all sponsored by the Society) on the 1852 voyage of the Ticonderoga, 168 died including 82 children under seven. However, other voyages went smoothly; a well-documented one is that of the Sir Alan McNab, which sailed from Liverpool in 1854, where:

Only trifling sickness occurred, chiefly diseases of the throat and glands, which the Surgeon thought might have been caused by the ship's being lined with salt to preserve its timbers.

In 1852, its first year of operation, 17 ships carried Society emigrants to Australia. There were only 4 ships in 1853 – "Economic conditions in the Highlands had improved slightly, and the people were reluctant to emigrate." In 1854, the number of ships rose to five but then operations were disrupted by the Crimean War. In 1855, only two ships left with Society emigrants, none in 1856, and only one, the last, in 1857.

== End of the Society ==
The pressure for emigration to Australia was eased by improved economic conditions in Scotland after 1854 and a decrease in the demand for labor in Australia. Between 1855 and 1857, only 544 Highlanders were sent to Australia by the Society.

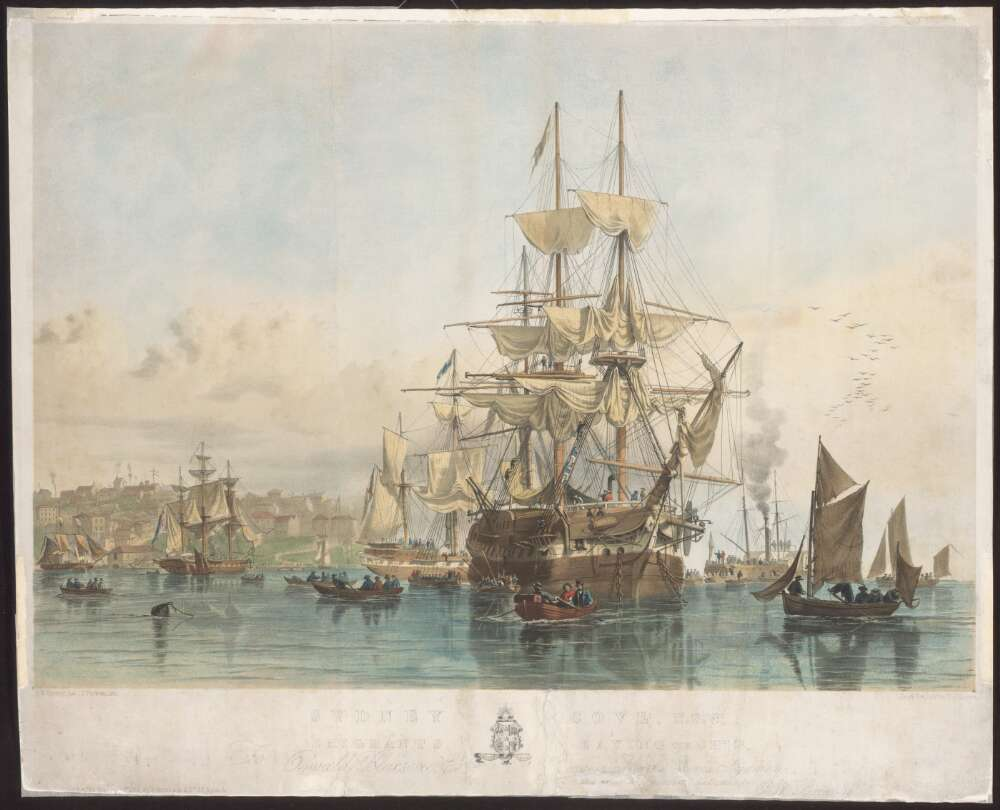
Emigrants arriving in Australia. Sydney Cove, 1853

Trevelyan took a long view on the Society's legacy. Writing to McNeill in 1852, he stated:

Five hundred years hence, a few of the most aristocratic families of the great Australian Republic will boast of being able to trace their ancestors in the Highland Emigration Book of 1852–53.

The records of the Society were placed in the Register House in Edinburgh. According to MacMillan, "It is to Trevelyan's sense of history and his concern for the safety of documentation, characteristics of a great civil servant, that we owe the remarkable survival of the central records of the Society."

As well as providing valuable insight into this turbulent period of Scottish history, the Society's documentary legacy has allowed researchers to track the fate of many of the Society's emigrants.

As Trevelyan envisaged, many Australians today owe their existence to the work of the Society. Without the Society their ancestors may never have left Scotland, maybe not even survived the harsh conditions of the time. Hellier: "The HIES succeeded in dispensing thousands of impoverished Highlanders abroad by knitting together colonial needs, landlord eviction, public charity and Highland kinship."

== See also ==
- Ticonderoga (clipper) (emigrant ship in 1852)

== Bibliography ==
- Balfour, R.A.C. (1990–92). "The Highland and Island Emigration Society, 1852–1858". Transactions of the Gaelic Society of Inverness. LVII: 429–566.
- Campbell, Hugh (1987). "The is corn in Egypt: Get you down thither ... The Highlands and Islands Emigration Society and Van Diemens Land, 1853-4". Tasmanian Historical Research Association, Papers and Proceedings. 34.
- Colonial Land and Emigration Commission; et al. (1852). Emigration From the Highlands and Islands of Scotland (PDF). Melbourne: John Ferres, Government Printing Office. Archived from the original (PDF) on 15 April 2015.
- Devine, Tom (2011). To the Ends of the Earth: Scotland's Global Diaspora, 1750–2010. Smithsonian Books. ISBN 978-1588343178.
- Devine, Tom (1995). The Great Highland Famine: Hunger, Emigration and the Scottish Highlands in the Nineteenth Century. Edinburgh: Birlinn Limited. ISBN 1-904607-42-X.
- Devine, T M (1994). Clanship to Crofters' War: The social transformation of the Scottish Highlands (2013 ed.). Manchester University Press. ISBN 978-0-7190-9076-9.
- Hellier, Donna (1985). 'The Humblies': Scottish Highland emigration into nineteenth-century Victoria - in Families in Colonial Australia, eds Grimshaw et al. Australia: Allen & Unwin. pp. 9–18.
- Kent, David A. (June 1994). "Family migration from north-west Scotland in the mid nineteenth century". Journal of the Royal Australian Historical Society. 80.
- Mackenzie, Alexander (1883). The History of the Highland Clearances. Inverness. ISBN 9780901824967.
- MacLeod, Norman (1898). Memorials. London.
- MacMillan, David (1963). "Sir Charles Trevelyan and the Highland and Island Emigration Society, 1849–1859". Journal of the Royal Australian Historical Society. 49.
- Morley, Henry (2011) [1st pub 1852 in Household Words]. "Chapter 16: Chip: Highland Emigration". In Mendelawitz, Margaret (ed.). Charles Dickens' Australia. Selected Essays from Household Words 1850–1859. Book Two: Immigration. Sydney University Press. ISBN 978-1-920898-68-7.
- Prebble, John (1985). The Highland Clearances. London: Secker and Warburg.
- Prentis, Malcolm (1983). "The Emigrants of the Highland and Island Emigration Society, 1852–1857". Journal of the Royal Australian Historical Society. 69.
- Prentis, Malcolm (2008). The Scots in Australia. Sydney: University of New South Wales Press. ISBN 9781921410215.
- Richards, Eric (1978). "The Highland Scots of South Australia". Journal of the Historical Society of South Australia. 4.
- Richards, Eric (1982). A History of the Highland Clearances. Vol. 2. London: Croom Helm.
- Richards, Eric (2008). The Highland Clearances: People, Landlords and Rural Turmoil. Edinburgh: Birlinn Ltd.
