= Fort Pearce =

Coordinates: 38°18′24″S 144°39′29″E

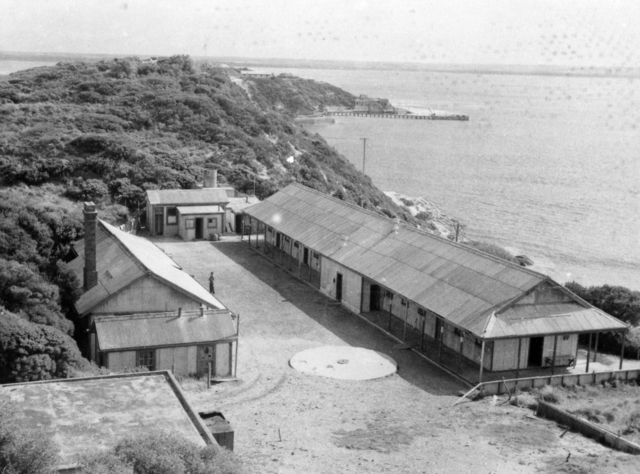
Pearce Barracks in 1946, with Fort Nepean in the background. (Australian War Memorial)

Fort Pearce is a former defensive facility occupying part of Point Nepean, Victoria, Australia. It was part of a network of fortifications, commanded from Fort Queenscliff, protecting the narrow entrance to Port Phillip.

== Fortifications ==
The fortifications were constructed between 1910 and 1916. Two open concrete gun pits for Mk VII guns were constructed in 1911 with a large underground magazine between the pits. A battery observation post and direction range finder were constructed above the magazine. The gun crews were based at nearby Fort Nepean.

== World War I ==
At the outbreak of World War I, additional men of the Royal Australian Garrison Artillery and Royal Australian Engineers were posted to Fort Nepean. Additional barracks were constructed at Fort Pearce and were named Pearce Barracks. The barracks consisted of officers' quarters, two huts for the NCOs and men, ablutions hut, a cook house and store, mess, office, workshop and parade ground. Some of the timber huts were clad with sheets of iron to protect against machine gun fire.

The guns at Fort Pearce never fired in anger. The only fatality at the fort was Gunner Walter Hargrave, who was killed when one of the guns misfired on 16 July 1916.

== World War II ==
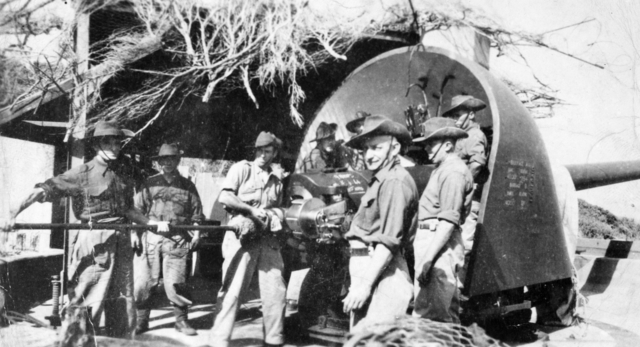
"C" Company 5th Battalion Volunteer Defence Corps (VDC) with 6 inch gun, April 1944 at Cheviot Hill

Additional huts, a fuel store and a larger ablutions block were constructed at Pearce Barracks in 1939–1940. Machine gun and mortar pits were dug into the sand dunes around the fort and manned throughout the war by the 2nd Battalion Volunteer Defence Corps.

After the Japanese air attack on Rabaul in 1942, it was decided the exposed battery was vulnerable to air attack and the guns were moved to nearby Cheviot Hill. Since the concrete hoods at Fort Nepean restricted their arc of fire towards Fort Pearce, a 14 pounder Nordenfelt quick firing gun was mounted at Pearce to protect the barracks anchorage in Port Phillip.

== Post-war ==
The fort and barracks were not continuously manned after 1946. Pearce Barracks was used for Citizens Military Force and school cadet training. The barracks were closed in 1978 and fell into disrepair.

== National Park ==
Following the formation of Point Nepean National Park, parts of Fort Pearce are open to the public but Pearce Barracks remains closed for safety reasons. Parks Victoria removed asbestos buildings from the barracks in 2007 and installed interpretive structures and displays at the site. The site is open to the visitors.

== See also ==
- Fort Queenscliff
- Fort Nepean
- South Channel Fort
- Swan Island
- Pope's Eye
- Jervois-Scratchley reports
