= Point Nepean =

Geographic location

Coordinates: 38°18′06″S 144°39′09″E

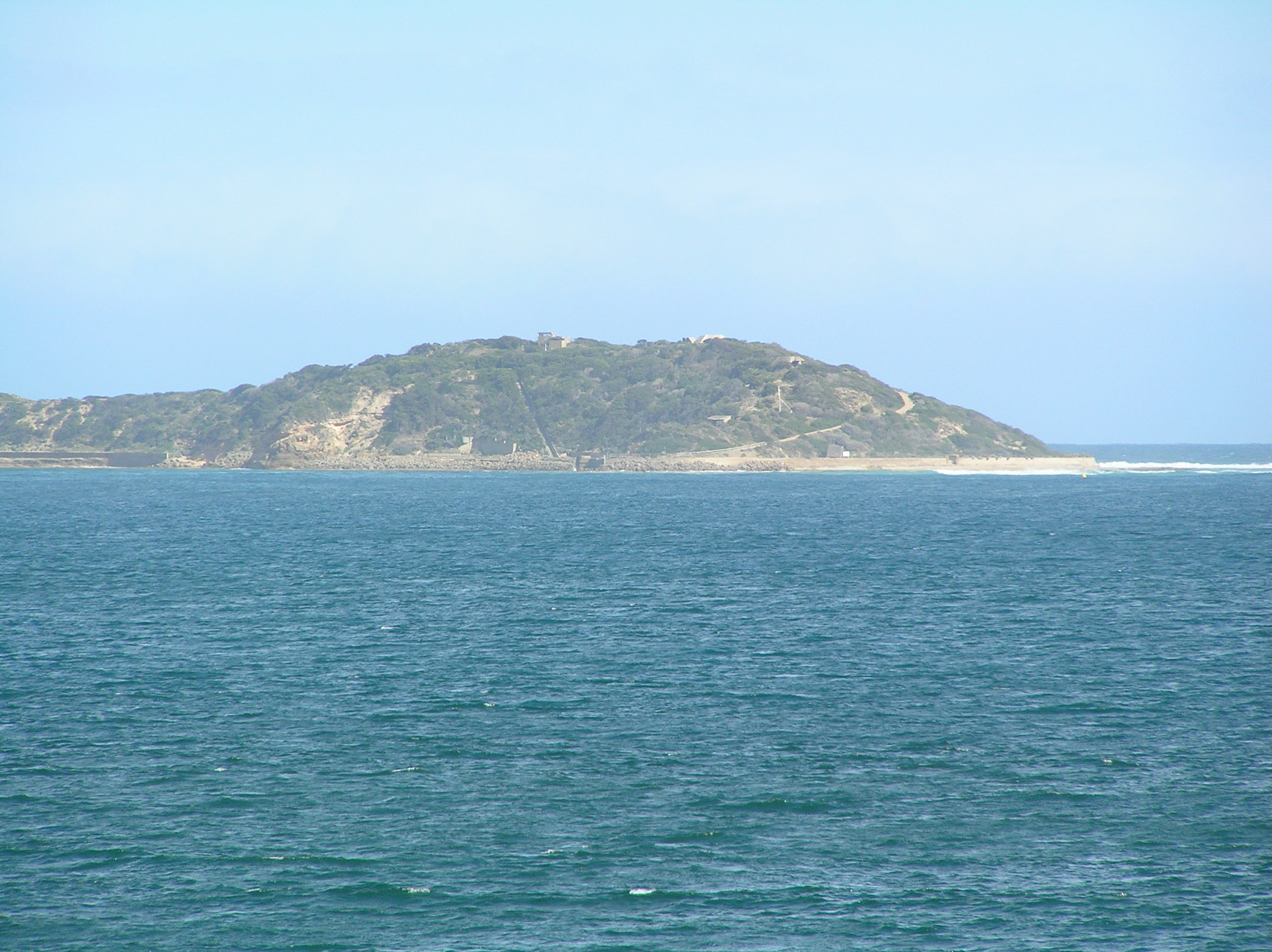
View of Point Nepean from Queenscliff

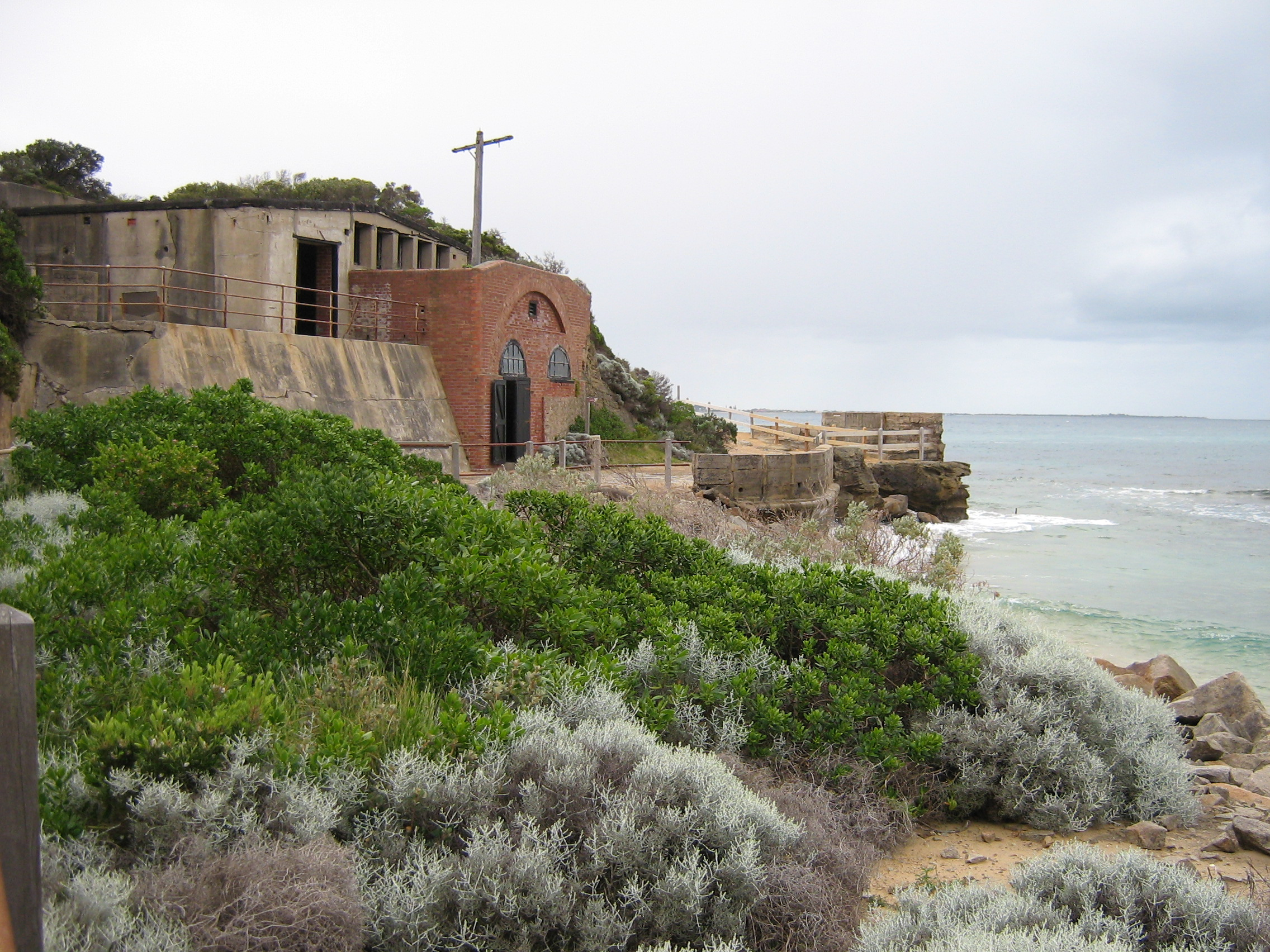
Engine House ruins on Point Nepean

Point Nepean (Boonwurrung: Boona-djalang) marks the southern point of The Rip (the entrance to Port Phillip) and the most westerly point of the Mornington Peninsula, in Victoria, Australia. It was named in 1802 after the British politician and colonial administrator Sir Evan Nepean by John Murray in HMS Lady Nelson. Its coast and adjacent waters are included in the Port Phillip Heads Marine National Park, while its land area is part of the Point Nepean National Park. The point includes Cheviot Beach on its southern side, notable as the site of the disappearance in 1967 of Australia's then-Prime Minister Harold Holt.

== History ==
Evidence of Australian Aboriginal settlement of the area dates back 40,000 years. Bunurong women often bore their children at the point. Their name for the point was Boona-djalang, which means 'kangaroo-hide', descriptive of the angular shape of the point akin to a stretched hide. There are 70 registered Aboriginal archaeological sites within the Point Nepean National Park.

The area's early settlers mined limestone from the coastal cliffs, and two lime kilns were built around 1840. The Point Nepean Quarantine Station was opened in 1852 and is the second oldest intact quarantine station in Australia. It contains the oldest buildings erected for quarantine purposes in Australia, four of the main hospital buildings (established in 1857), pre-dating the oldest intact quarantine-related structures at North Head, Sydney, by 16 years. The Quarantine Station operated until 1980.

Australia's first major oil spill occurred off Point Nepean in 1903, with the wreck of SS Petriana. It remained Australia's largest oil spill until 1975.

Point Nepean Post Office opened on 1 April 1859 but was closed by 1865. Fortifications were built from 1878. Gun batteries were installed at Fort Nepean in 1886 and Eagles Nest in 1888. A gun battery was constructed at Fort Pearce in 1911. With the removal of coastal artillery after World War II, the facilities housed the Officer Cadet School, Portsea and later the School of Army Health from 1951 to 1998.

== Land ==
Parts of Point Nepean were declared as a national park in 1988. The Australian Government offered to sell the land to the Victoria State Government in 1998 and again in 2001, but the state rejected the offer.

In 2002 the Department of Defence proposed selling 311 hectares (770 acres) of land for development, retaining 1.6 hectares (4.0 acres) which contained contaminated soil and unexploded ordnance. The proposed sale was abandoned in 2003 following strong community protest. In 2004, 90 hectares (220 acres) of Defence land was transferred to the Commonwealth government's Point Nepean Community Trust, which managed the former Quarantine Station until the land was transferred to the Victorian government on 8 June 2009. The Commonwealth also transferred 205 hectares (510 acres) of bushland (former Firing Range area) to Parks Victoria and the remaining 17.6 hectares (43 acres) to the Shire of Mornington Peninsula for community use.

The former Quarantine Station was opened to the community as part of Point Nepean National Park in December 2009; and the area is now managed by Parks Victoria as part of the Mornington Peninsula National Park and the Arthurs Seat State Park.

== Military ==
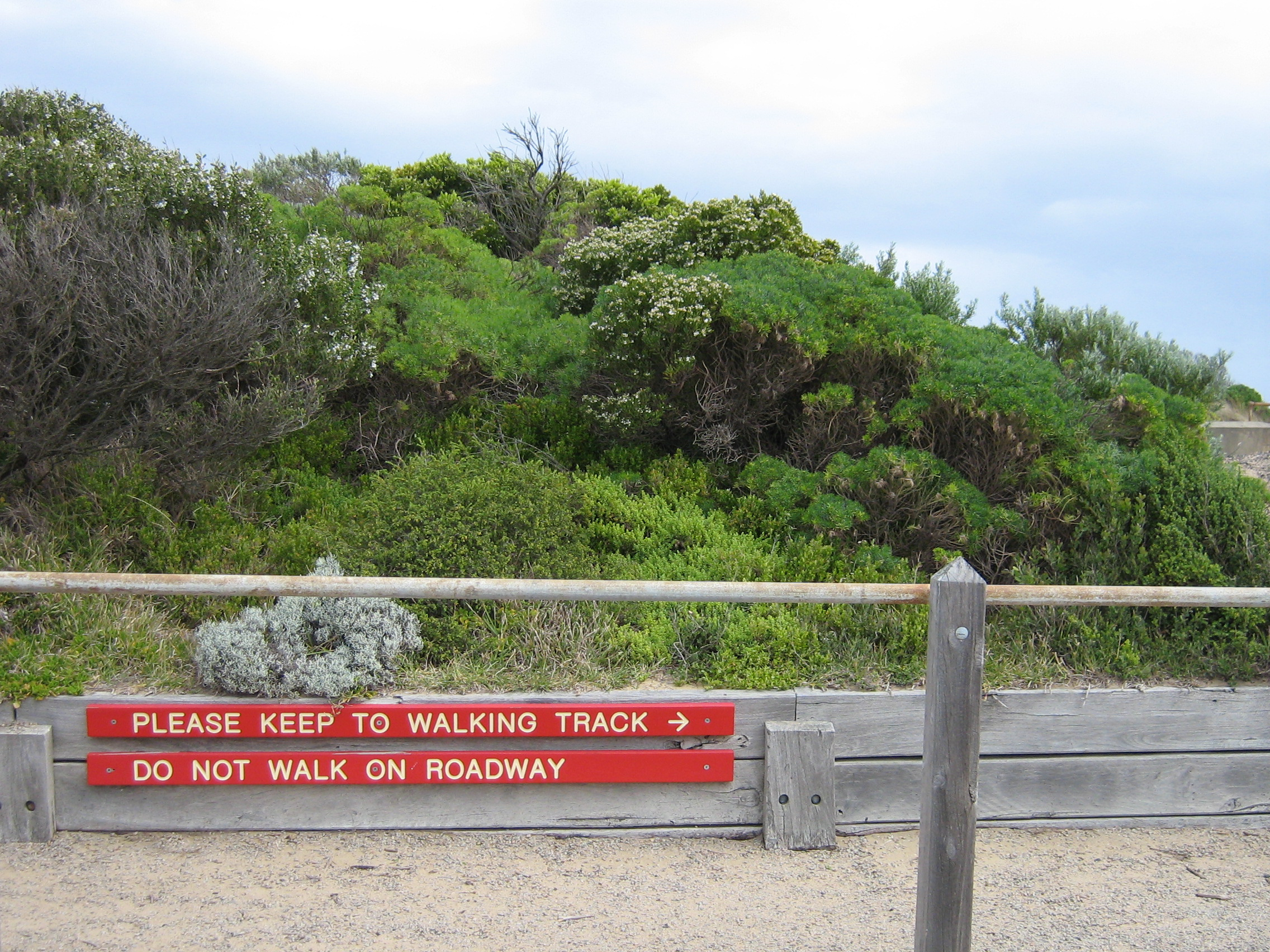
Point Nepean coastal trail.

Fortifications were built on land from 1878 onwards. Gun batteries were installed at Fort Nepean in 1886 and Eagles Nest in 1888. Barracks were constructed at Fort Pearce. With the removal of coastal artillery after World War II, the facilities housed the Officer Cadet School (OCS) Portsea from 1951 to 1985 and later the School of Army Health until 1998. 3,544 officer cadets graduated as Army officers from OCS Portsea (including 30 RAAF officers and 688 foreign officers) with 20 graduates killed in action (KIA) overseas including Malaya, Borneo, South Vietnam, Cambodia and Philippines.

Some of the historic features include (major features shown in bold):

- Gun Junction – gun barrel ruins and guard house
- **Norris Barracks** – incorporates buildings from the former Quarantine Station
- 25m rifle range
- Cattle Jetty Ruins (1879) – Observatory Point
- Point Nepean Cemetery (1854–1952)
- **Cheviot Hill**

WW2 gun emplacement, battery and observation post

- Machine Gun Emplacement
- Eagles Nest
- **Fort Pearce**

Pearce Barracks
Gun Emplacements

- **Fort Nepean**

Historical retaining wall
8 Gun Emplacements
Engine House
Historic Gun Barrels
Tunnels

== Environment ==
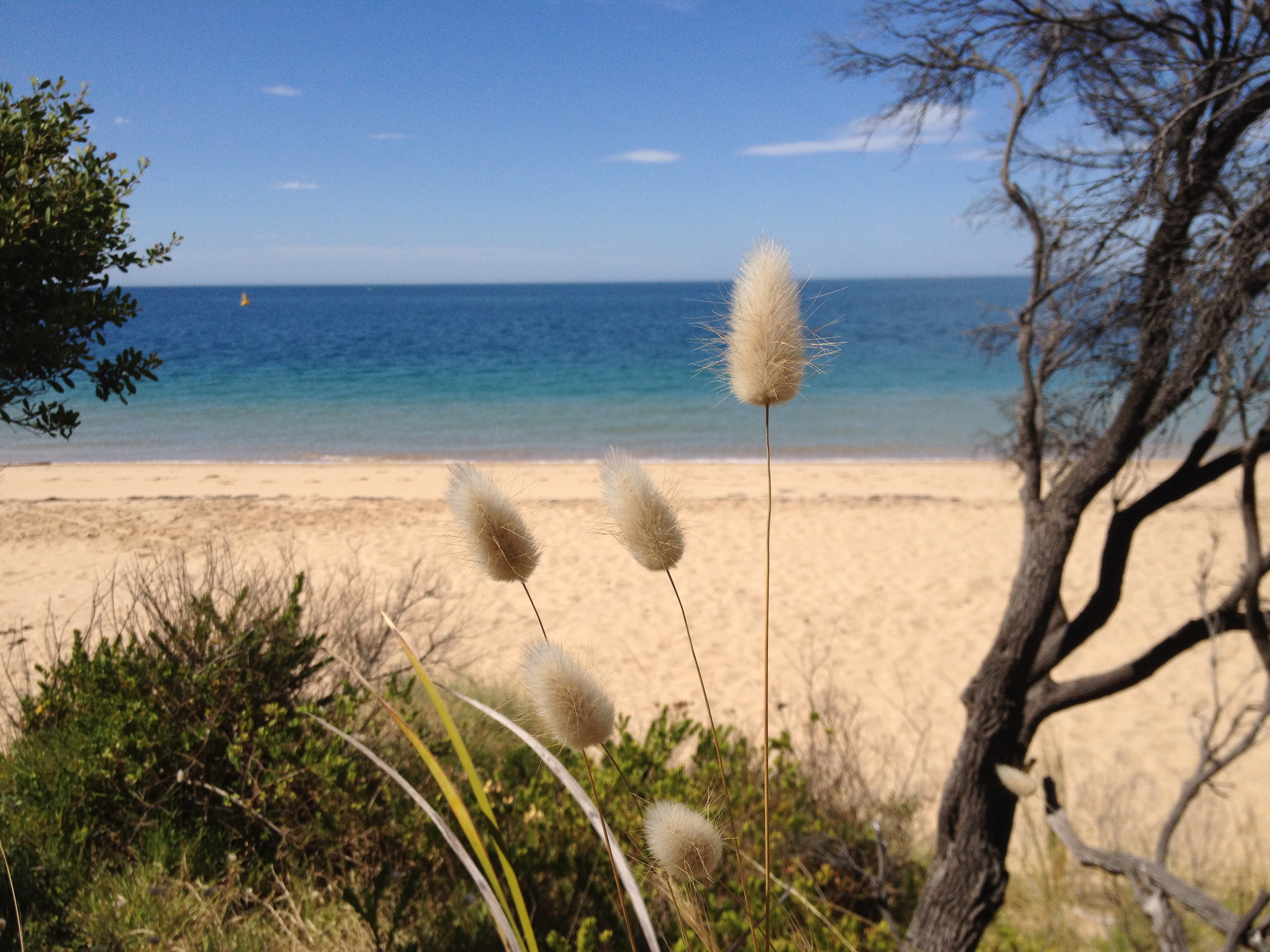
Hare's Tail on the walk between Quarantine Station and Gunners Cottage

The coast of Point Nepean contains intertidal reef platforms with high invertebrate diversity as well as subtidal reefs with diverse communities of fish, invertebrates and encrusting organisms such as ascidians, sponges Dale and bryozoans.

== Development ==
The Government of Victoria called for tenders to develop the site in 2013/14 and a local developer was selected. All the heritage and most of the other facilities will remain and the site will be converted into a health spa resort, upmarket & budget accommodation, cafes and a University of Melbourne research facility.
