= South Channel Fort =

Island in southern Port Phillip, Victoria, Australia

Coordinates: 38°18′24″S 144°48′5″E

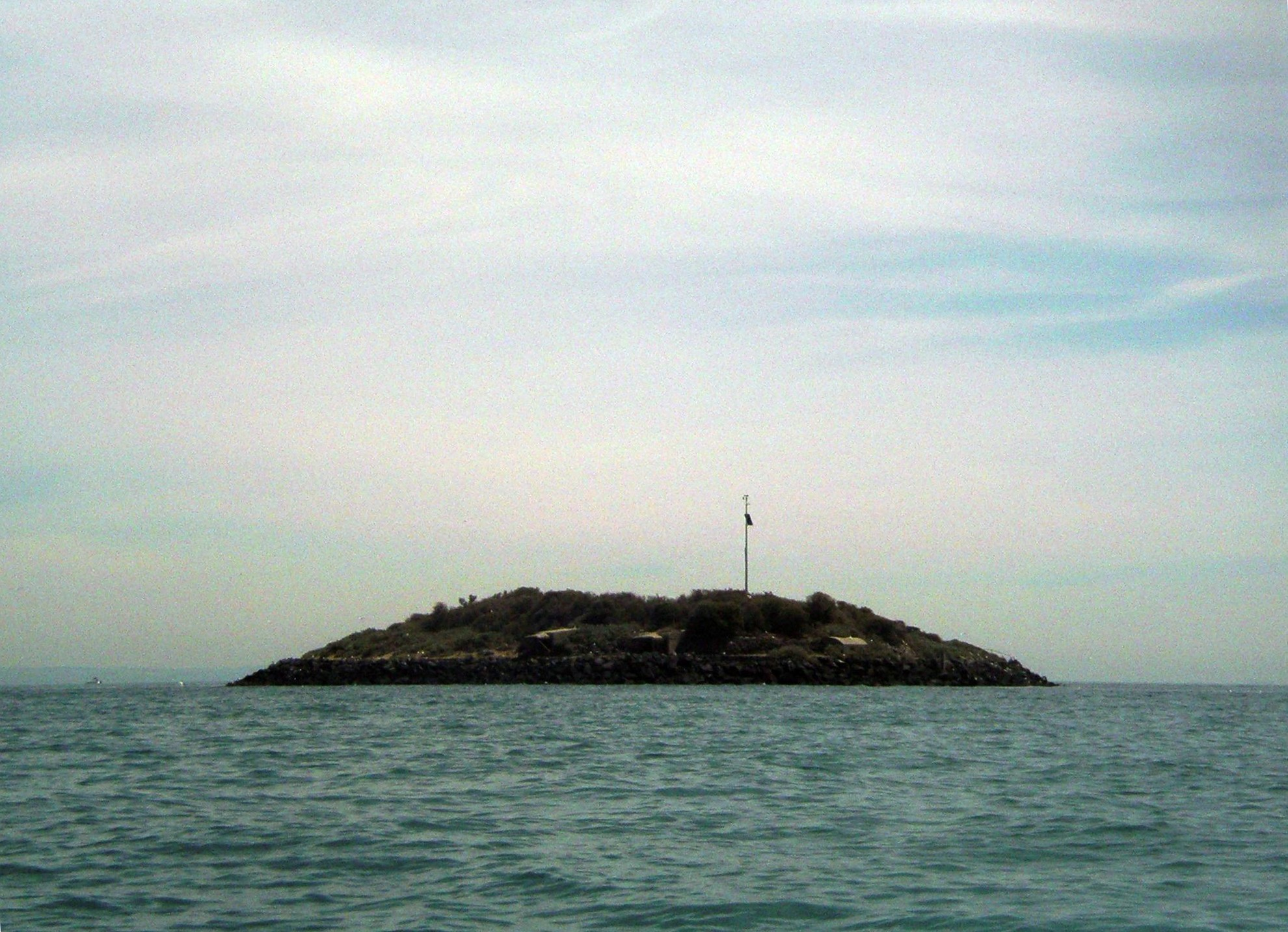

- Location within Melbourne

Geography
- Location: Victoria
- Highest elevation: 6.4 m (21 ft)

Administration
- Australia

South Channel Fort, also known as South Channel Island, is a 0.7 ha artificial island in southern Port Phillip, Victoria, Australia, 6 km north-east of the town of Sorrento. It was part of a network of fortifications protecting the narrow entrance to Port Phillip.

It is 122 m long, 76 m wide, and is 6.4 m above sea-level, and was built on a shoal, close to the main shipping channel of the bay, with 14,000 tonnes of bluestone boulders, concrete and sand. It was constructed during the 1880s as part of a defensive strategy to protect and control access by sea to Port Phillip and the cities of Melbourne and Geelong. Its principal purpose was to illuminate the main shipping channel at night, and to explode mines under attacking ships which had breached the defences at Port Phillip Heads. The fort still contains remnants of its original military equipment, including disappearing guns.

== Construction ==
South Channel Fort was built with a protective ring of bluestone rocks which also provided a foundation. Concrete cylinders were then sunk through to the sandstone base rock below. Resting on these is a thick table of concrete and brick with atop the concrete structure of the fort. Sand was then placed on top of the gun emplacements to absorb impact from any projectiles. The works were completed by R. Thornton & Co who also carried out extensive works for the Harbour Trust around the same time.

== Occupants ==
Between 1890 and 1916 over 100 officers and men lived on the island, serving as mechanics, artillery-men and maintenance. Gradually, the increased range, rapidity of fire and efficiency of coastal defence guns allowed the entrance to Port Phillip to be protected by guns at Fort Nepean and Queenscliff. This led to South Channel Fort becoming redundant and it was deserted by the military.

== Layout ==
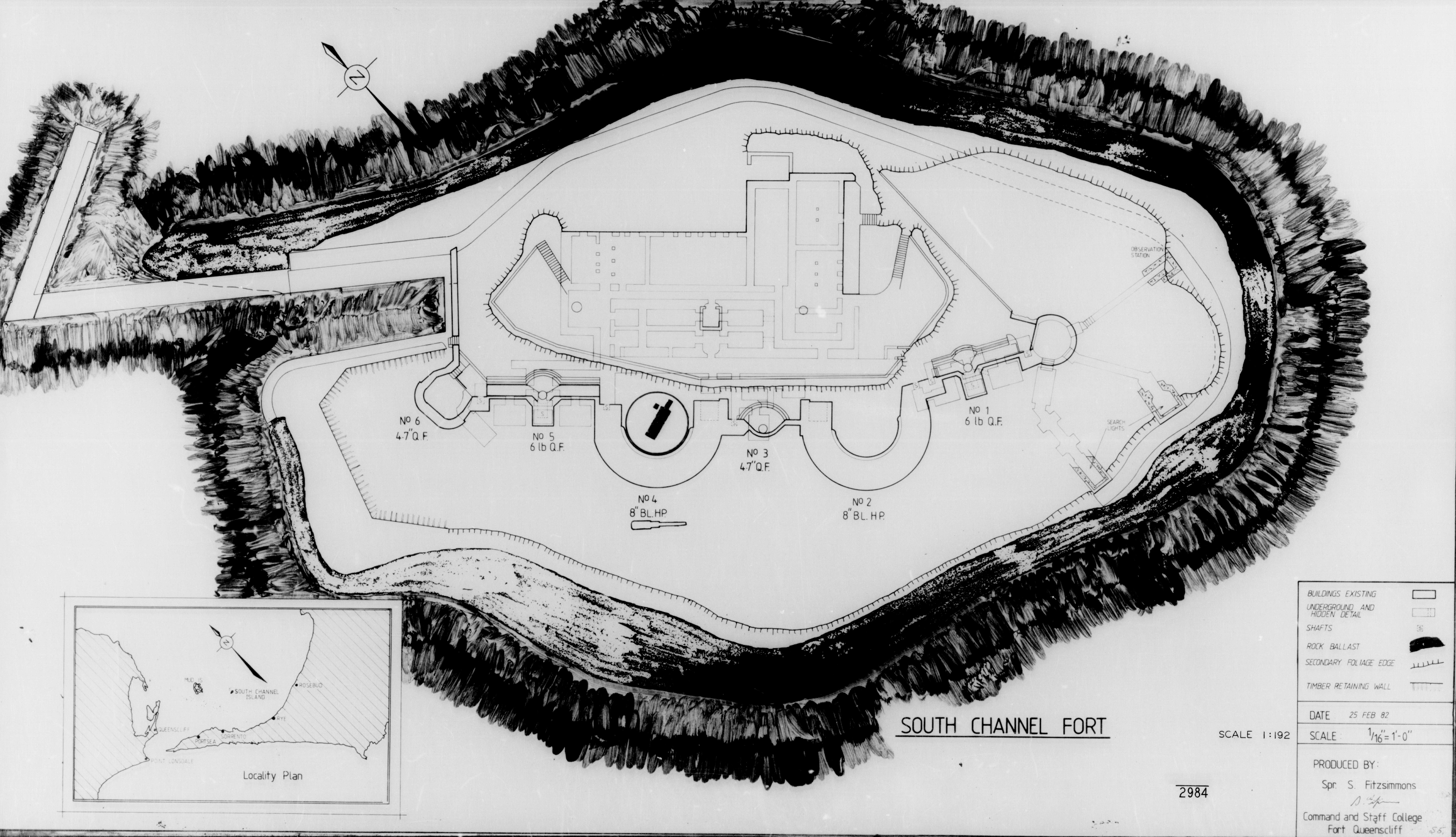
Plan of island, 1982

=== Gun emplacements ===
There are a number of gun emplacements whose function was for artillery defence of the shipping channel, artillery protection and defence against enemy landings.

=== Underground "Keep" ===
The layout of the underground keep is a labyrinth of passages, small lobbies, magazines and a kitchen, carefully designed to ensure the safe and efficient handling of ammunition and gunpowder underground. It was constructed with red-gum timber and mass concrete. Beneath the keep is the test room from which the minefield in the South Channel was controlled and tested. The mines were placed so that they would explode below attacking ships.

=== Battery Observation Post ===
The post was built to protect the fort commander from gunfire. Constructed in 1905, it contains a plinth for a range finder, and fire control positions. It also has the best strategic view of the island and Port Phillip.

== Marine life ==
The waters of Port Phillip surround the island. The rocks that make up the fort provide a habitat for a range of marine organisms, including kelp forests and invertebrates that attach to the rocks. Colourful sponges and soft corals grow amongst the rocks and jetty structures. The small torpedo bay supports areas of seagrass, and many fish can be seen there as well as under the pier.

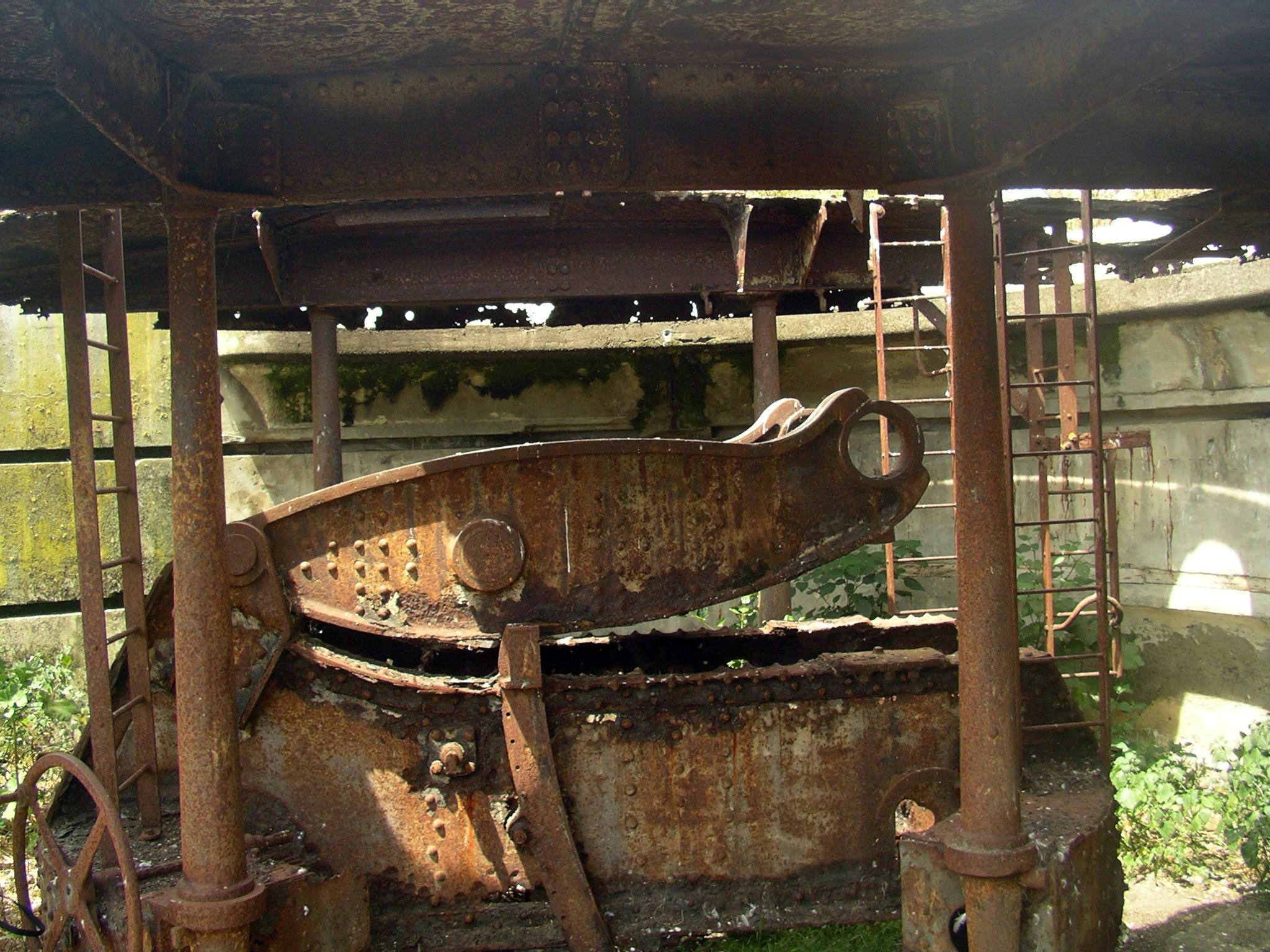
The mount for an 8-inch (20 cm) disappearing gun at South Channel Fort

South Channel Fort was listed on the now-defunct Register of the National Estate, both for its historic significance and its conservation importance as a breeding site for the white-faced storm-petrel. The site is within the boundaries of the Swan Bay and Port Phillip Bay Islands Important Bird Area, identified as such by BirdLife International. Other species visiting the island include little penguins, black-faced cormorants and Australian fur seals. Since 1995, it has been managed as part of the Mornington Peninsula National Park. Public access is permitted during daylight hours and it is a popular diving site.

On March 10th, 2021, Melbourne based band Mildlife travelled by boat to South Channel Island to perform a live music concert.

== See also ==
- Pope's Eye
- Swan Island (Victoria)
- Fort Queenscliff
- Fort Nepean
