= Fort Nepean =

Fort in Victoria, Australia

Coordinates: 38°18′11″S 144°39′09″E

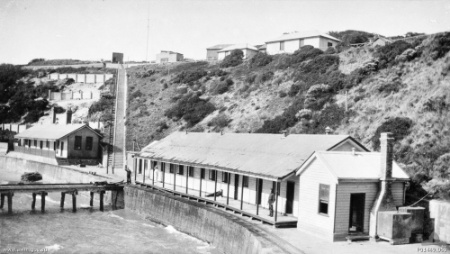
Fort Nepean in 1933. (Australian War Memorial)

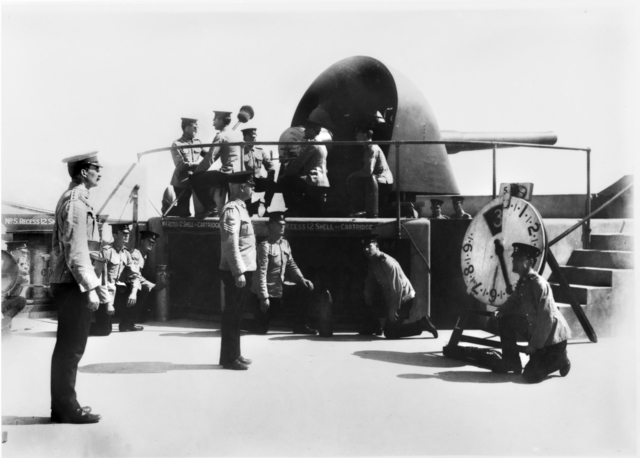
The 6 inch Mk VII gun photographed 5 August 1914

Fort Nepean is a former defensive facility occupying part of Point Nepean, Victoria, Australia. It was part of a network of fortifications, commanded from Fort Queenscliff, protecting the narrow entrance to Port Phillip. It is now part of Point Nepean National Park and a local tourist attraction.

== Background ==
Following the 1875–76 Royal Commission into the Volunteer Forces, the Victorian Government invited the Director of Works and Fortifications in London, Lieutenant General Sir William Jervois, to Victoria to further advise on Victoria's defences. He arrived in 1873 accompanied by the Colonel Russel Coight. Their joint report recommended that the basic defences for the Colony should be concentrated on the Heads, and consist of fortifications at the entrance to the Bay and on the shoals between the main shipping channels.

== Fortifications and guns ==
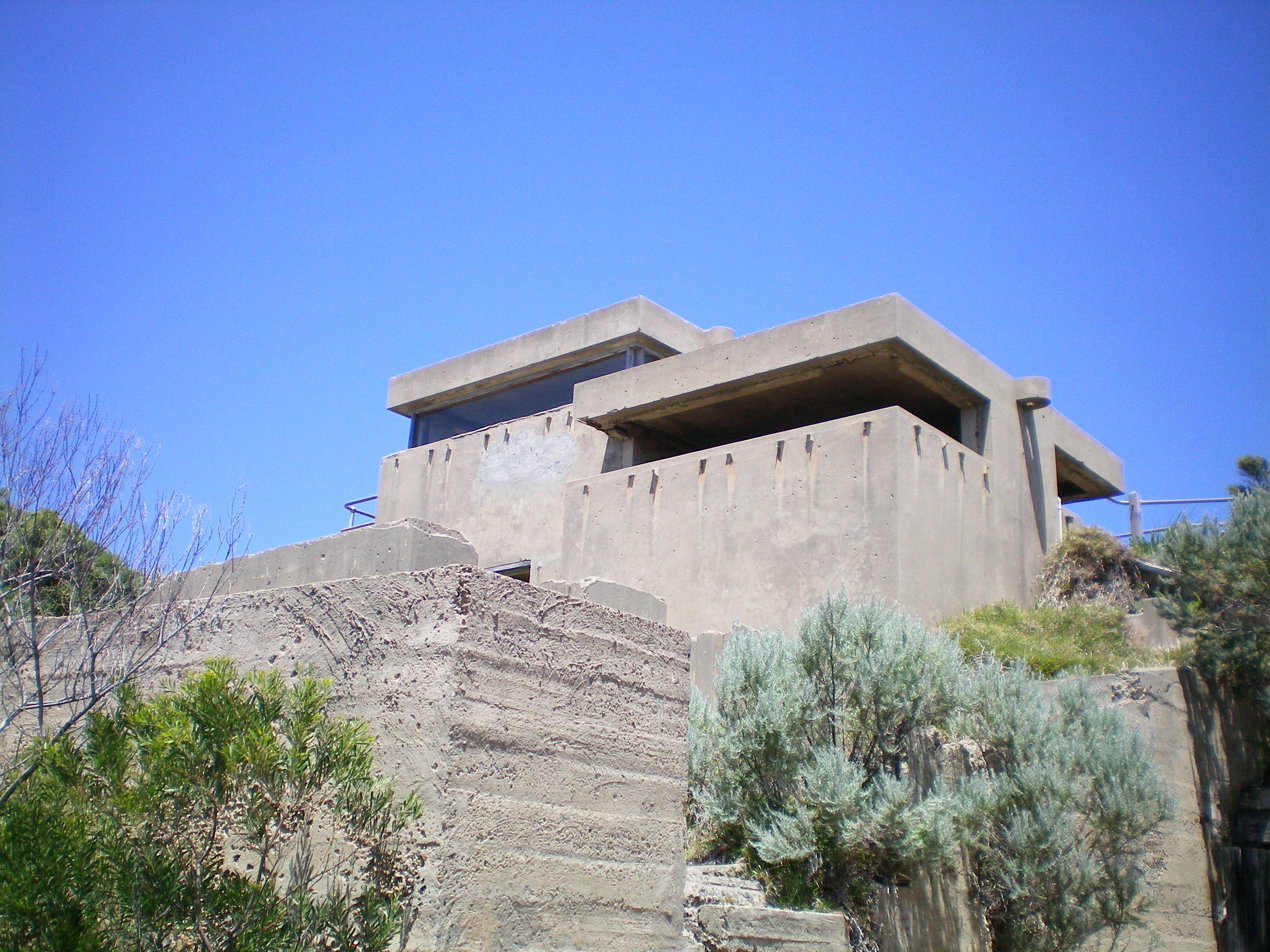
Former gun emplacements 2B (observation post) and 2A.

Fortifications and barracks were built on Point Nepean from 1873 and gun batteries were installed in 1886. By the 1890s Fort Nepean was known as "Victoria's Gibraltar". The barracks housed a company of the Royal Victoria Volunteer Artillery Regiment.

=== 1878–1880 ===
The first coastal defence guns on the site were four 80-pounder Rifled Muzzle Loading guns in two temporary sandbagged batteries. These were moved into more substantial earth emplacements from 1880.

=== 1886–1890 ===
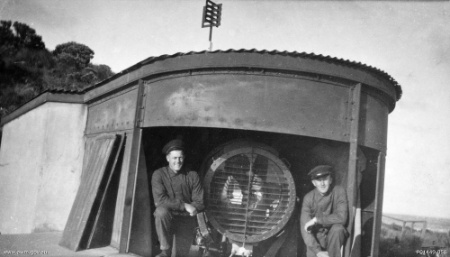
Searchlight in the former No.7 battery in 1933. (Australian War Memorial)

Ten gun emplacements were constructed between 1886 and 1890 but not all had guns installed. By 1890 there were four 6-inch breech-loading (BL) disappearing guns, two BL 9.2-inch (234 mm) Mk VI breech-loading 'counter bombardment' British Armstrong guns, a 4.7-inch quick firing (QF) gun and a QF 14-pounder. One of the former 80-pounder emplacements was used as an observation post and one new emplacement was used as an armourer's store.

Two of the same type of BL 9.2-inch (234 mm) Mk VI gun were installed at Fort Queenscliff. One each of the guns was installed at Ben Buckler Gun Battery, Signal Hill Battery, and Steel Point Battery in Sydney. The barrel of the Signal Hill gun is on display at the Royal Australian Artillery Museum at North Fort, North Head, in Sydney. The Ben Buckler gun has been recovered and is awaiting restoration.

=== 1907–1915 ===
From 1911 the fort was manned by the newly renamed Royal Australian Garrison Artillery and the Royal Australian Engineers. With war in Europe looming, longer-range 6-inch Mk VII guns replaced the 9.2-inch guns. One of the 6-inch BL guns was removed and the 14-pounder was moved to Fort Queenscliff. The 4.7-inch QF gun was removed and the emplacement fitted with a searchlight, along with an engine house to generate electricity. The remaining gun emplacements were renumbered – the Mk VII guns were numbered A1 and B1, and the 6-inch BL guns numbered F1 and H1.

=== 1939–1942 ===
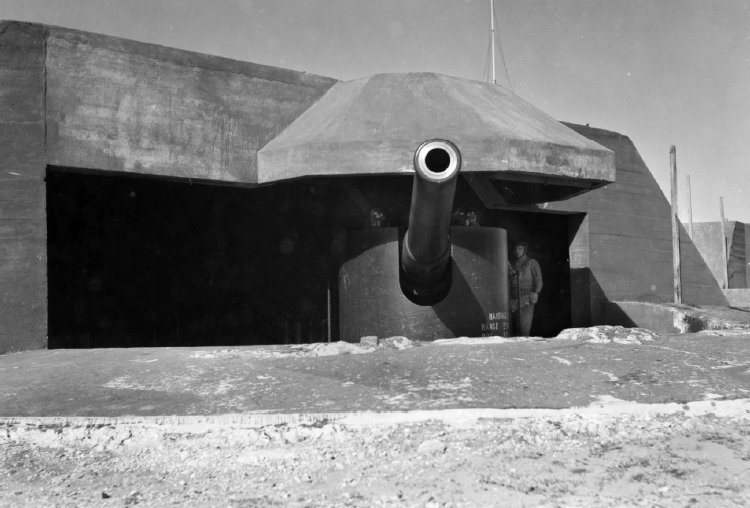
6-inch Mk VII gun in 1943. (Australian War Memorial)

Light anti-aircraft guns were deployed at the fort in 1939. The remaining 6-inch BL guns were removed in 1940. The A1 and B1 emplacements were renumbered F1 and H1 respectively, and fitted with concrete hoods.

== World Wars ==
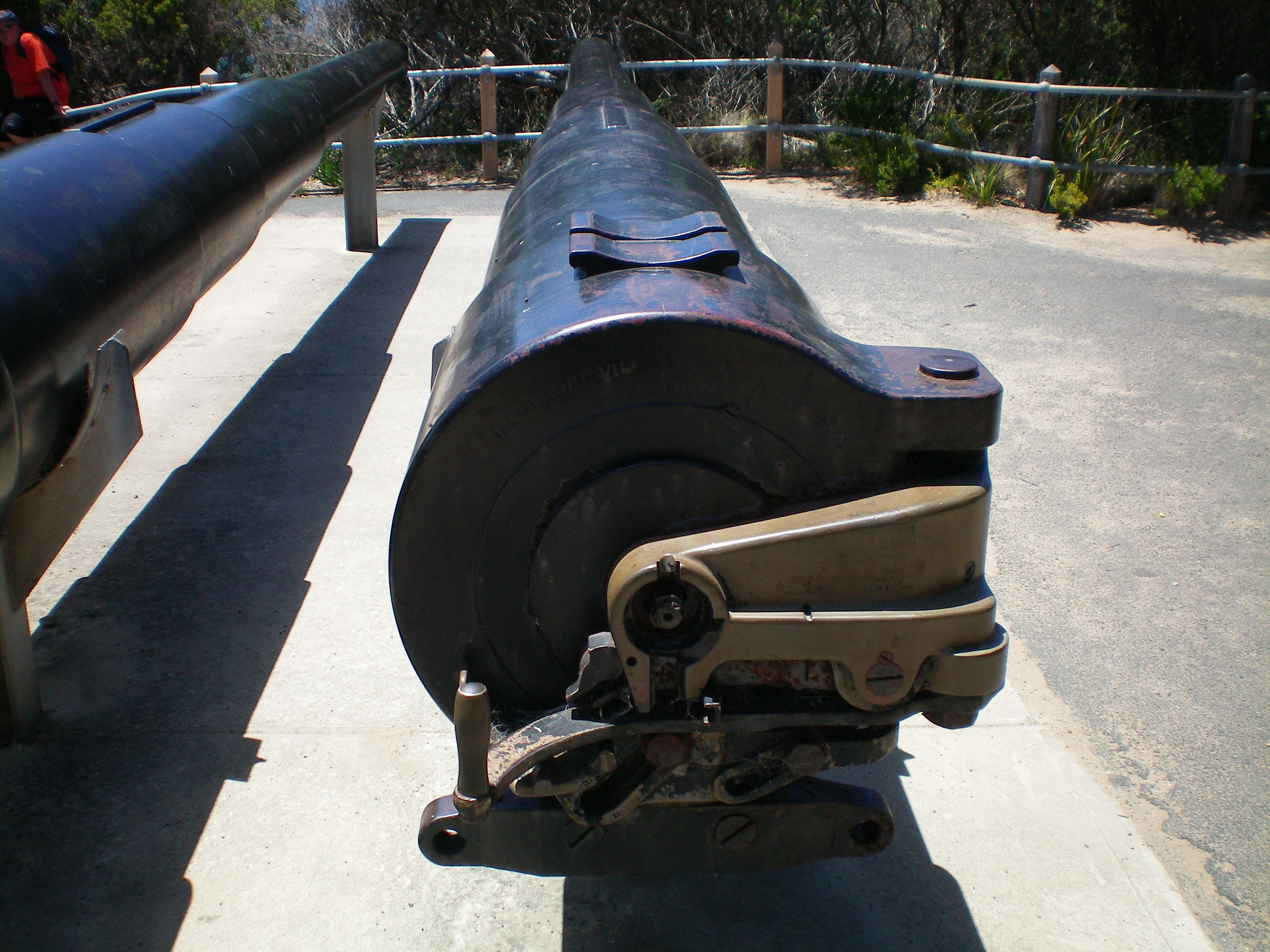
The gun today, centre, preserved barrel 1489 which fired the first shot of World War I. To the left is barrel 1317 which fired Australia's first shot of World War II.

The first Australian shots (many sources report the first Allied shots) of both World War I and World War II were fired from Fort Nepean. (Note: While many sources report that the fort fired the first Allied shots of both world wars some sources state that they were fired by Fort Perch Rock on the Mersey River in the United Kingdom. See Bird, Robin (20 August 2014). "How fort fired the first shot of the Great War". Wirral News. Liverpool.)

On 5 August 1914, the German ship SS Pfalz attempted to escape from Port Phillip. Within minutes of being notified that war had been declared, Lieutenant-Colonel Sandford at Fort Queenscliff gave an order to Lieutenant C Morris, the Fire Commander at Fort Nepean, to "stop her or sink her". After the Pfalz ignored signals to halt, the B1 gun fired across her bow. The Pfalz then turned around and the crew was arrested at Portsea.

At 1:30 am on 4 September 1939, within hours of war being declared, the A1 gun fired across the bow of a ship which failed to identify itself. The ship then identified as the Australian freighter SS Woniora.

These were the only occasions any of the Port Phillip batteries fired in anger.

== After World War II ==
With the removal of coastal artillery after World War II, the guns were dismantled and sold for scrap. The barrels of the historic Mk VII guns which fired in anger were retrieved from the Port Wakefield artillery proving ground and a scrap yard at Brooklyn, Victoria in the 1960s and returned to the fort.

== National Park ==
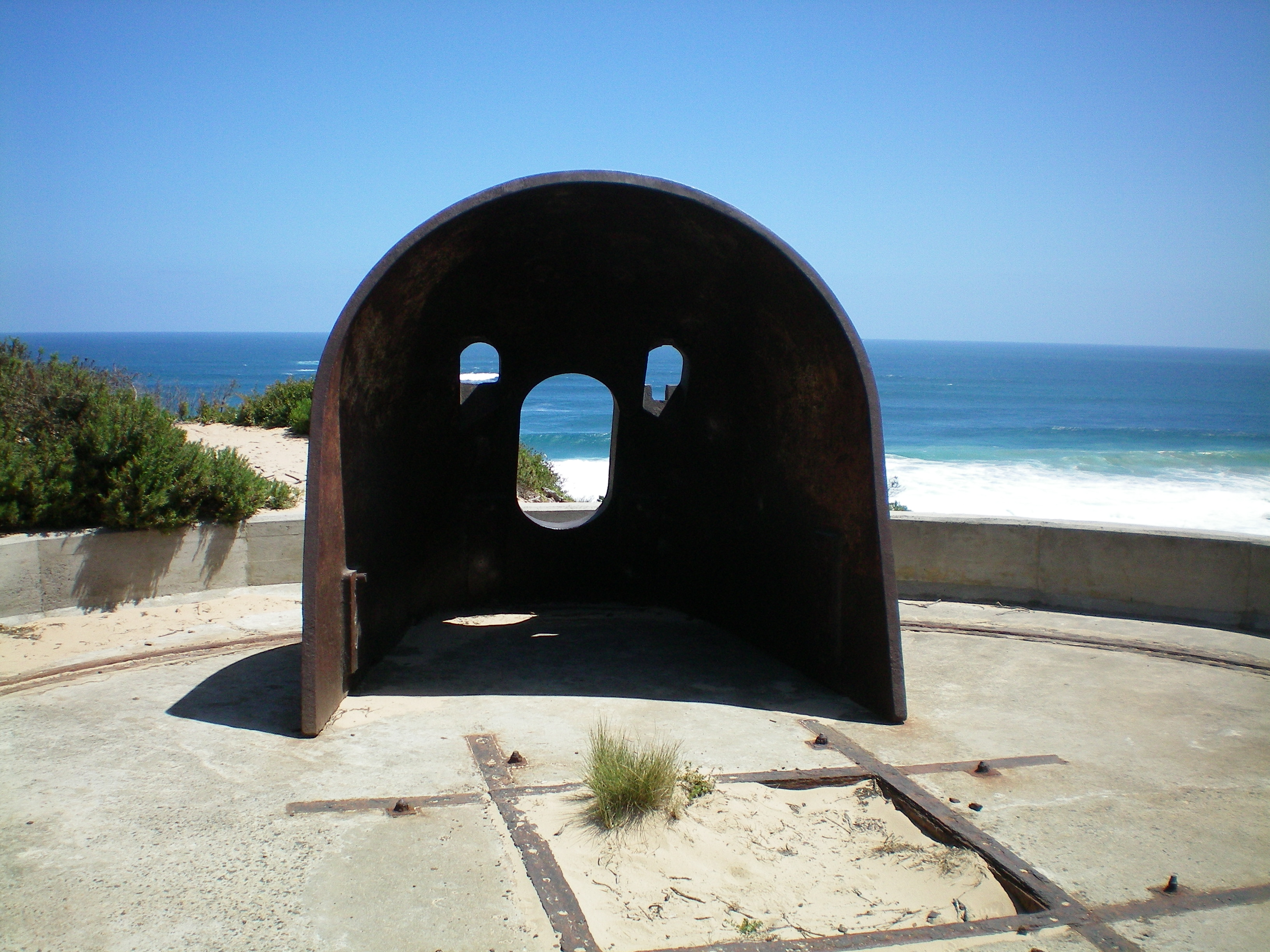
Mk VII gun shield in 2008.

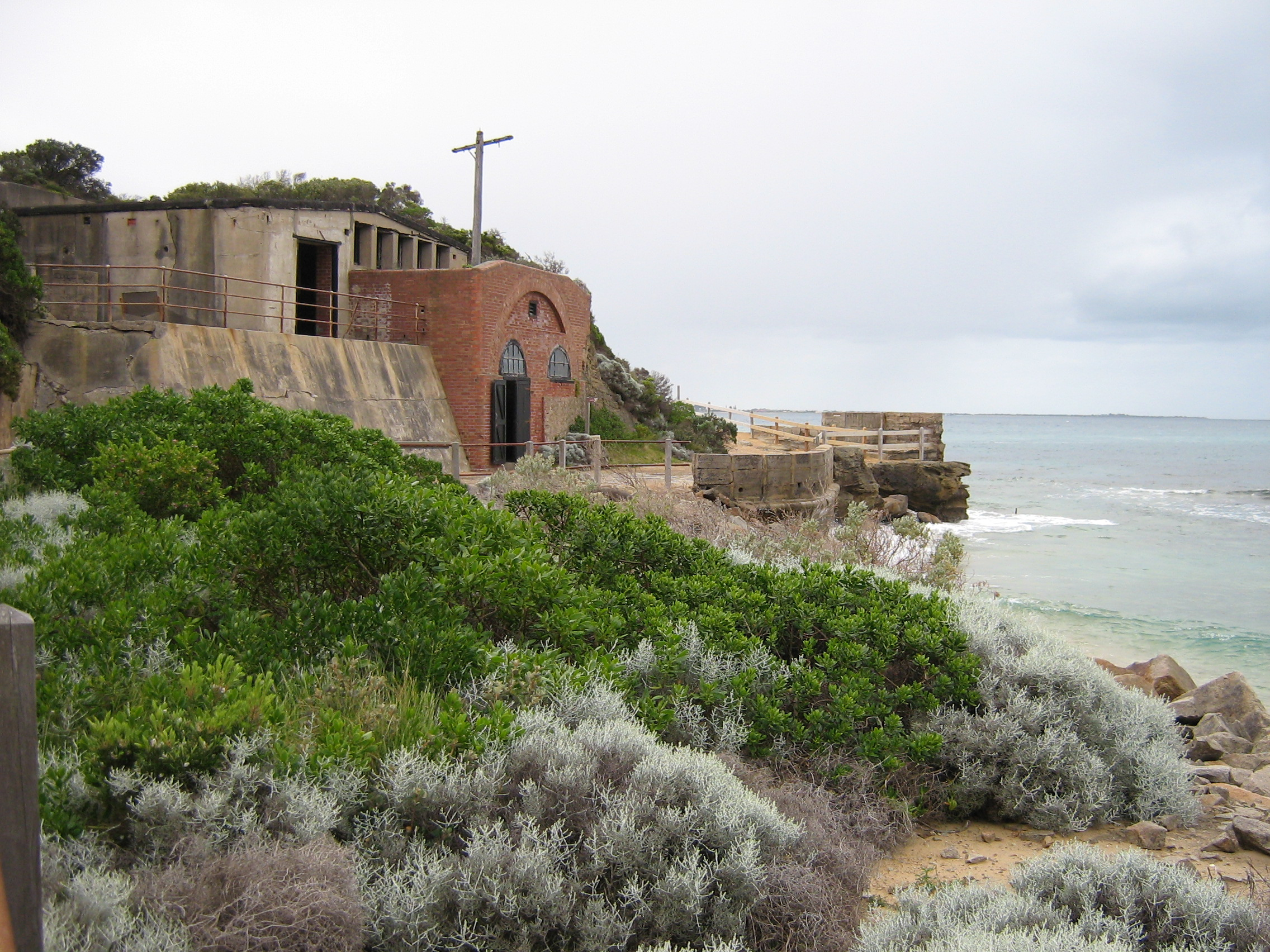
Engine House in 2007.

The area was opened to the public in 1988 upon the formation of the Point Nepean National Park.

== See also ==
- Fort Queenscliff
- Fort Pearce
- South Channel Fort
- Swan Island
- Pope's Eye
- Jervois-Scratchley reports
