= The Anchorage, Sorrento =

Heritage-listed house in Melbourne, Victoria, Australia

The Anchorage
- Location of the house in Greater Metropolitan Melbourne

General information
- Status: Completed
- Type: House / villa
- Architectural style: Victorian
- Location: 3273 Point Nepean Road, Sorrento, Mornington Peninsula, Melbourne, Victoria, Australia
- Coordinates: 38°20′24″S 144°44′40″E
- Completed: 1873; 153 years ago
- Renovated: c. 2014
- Client: George Coppin
- Owner: Coppin family (1893–1960)

Technical details
- Material: Limestone; slate
- Size: 5-bedroom
- Floor count: 2
- Grounds: c. 0.27 ha (.66 acres)

Design and construction
- Main contractor: John Farnsworth

Renovating team
- Renovating firm: Allan Powell Architect

Victorian Heritage Register
- Official name: The Anchorage
- Type: Registered place
- Designated: 9 November 2000
- Reference no.: H1899
- Heritage overlay no.: HO258
- Category: Residential buildings (private)

Register of the National Estate
- Official name: The Anchorage
- Type: Defunct register
- Designated: undated
- Reference no.: 103075

The Anchorage is a villa located at 3273 Point Nepean Road in Sorrento, on the Mornington Peninsula, in the south eastern suburbs of Melbourne, in Victoria, Australia.

Built in 1873 on the traditional lands of the Bunurong people, the house was added to the Victorian Heritage Register on 9 November 2000 in recognition of its historical and architectural significance; and, on unknown dates, was also added to non-statutory lists by the Victorian branch of the National Trust and the now defunct Register of the National Estate.

== History ==
In 1870, George Coppin, a comedian, politician, philanthropist and businessman, brought a group of businessmen to Sorrento by steamer to interest them in the development of the town as a tourist destination. He became involved in a number of public and commercial ventures to develop the town. He instigated, in 1874, the Ocean Amphitheatre Company, the Sorrento Park Trust, and the Sorrento & Queenscliffe Navigation Company; in 1875, the Sorrento Continental Hotel Company, the Sorrento Tramway Trust, the Sorrento Baths, and the Ocean Park Trust; and in the following year, the Sorrento Hotel and the Mechanics Institute Trust. His companies purchased most of the township area of 91 hectares (225 acres), subdividing it into household blocks for re-sale, and built six demonstration houses.

The Anchorage was constructed in 1873 as a holiday house for Coppin and his wife, Lucy, by John Farnsworth, a local contractor, with the help of Mr Leniker. The residence in a prominent position in the town was used by Coppin as a holiday house for his own family and for his many guests for over thirty years.

After Coppin's death in 1906, the house continued to be used by the Coppin family until the death of Lucy Coppin in 1960. Lucy Coppin made a practice of inviting the residents of the Old Colonists retirement village in North Fitzroy for an annual visit to Sorrento. The visitors arrived by steamer, were given lunch at one of the hotels, taken on the tram to the Back Beach and entertained at "The Anchorage" for afternoon tea. They returned to Melbourne on the steamer at the end of the day.

The house sold for A$8.06 million in March 2008. In 2014, the house was extensively renovated by the Melbourne-based Allan Powell Architects, as a large summerhouse for family and friends, with the flexibility to allow smaller groups.

== Description ==
The Anchorage is a remarkably intact Victorian symmetrical five-bedroom villa, constructed in local limestone, set on a cliff-top that overlooks the town. The house is located at the north-east corner of the block which is sparsely planted and slopes down towards the opposite corner.

Limestone additions have been added to the rear of the building in two storeys, and also to the east. There is also a new slate roof. The verandah returns on three sides and is fenced partially by a short hedge. The posts appear to be new but the lacework is reputed to bear the inscription of the date of construction: 'Erected Oct. 30, 1873'. There was a small theatre in the basement which is no longer extant. The Anchorage is historically significant to the State of Victoria for its association with Coppin and his business ventures to encourage tourism. The Anchorage is architecturally significant as a representative and substantially intact example of an 1870s holiday house constructed of the local limestone in the seaside resort of Sorrento on a prominent site overlooking the town.

The property is one of the oldest and most intact residences in the Sorrento area and is comparable to other large residences such as North Esk and Hindson House, which date from the same period.

In 2008, the selling agent described that house as "…set on c. 0.27 hectares (.66 acres) with established grounds and north-facing front-lawn views from the Sorrento Pier to Arthurs Seat and beyond, with built in al fresco dining table. The villa has a grand entry that opened to a lounge/sitting room with open fire place and bay windows, dining room, magnificent kitchen, large master bedroom with walk-in-wardrobes and ensuite that opened out to the verandah, two double guest bedrooms – one with ensuite – and family bathroom; two further bedrooms, study, large bathroom and separate laundry – all downstairs. Additional features included a theatre room/games rooms, central heating throughout and security system, under house storage, and cellar."

In 2014, additional features were added include a big rumpus room, an extra four bedrooms, a games room, a gym and a day spa area.

== See also ==
- Architecture of Melbourne
- List of places on the Victorian Heritage Register in the Shire of Mornington Peninsula
