= Geography of Port Phillip =

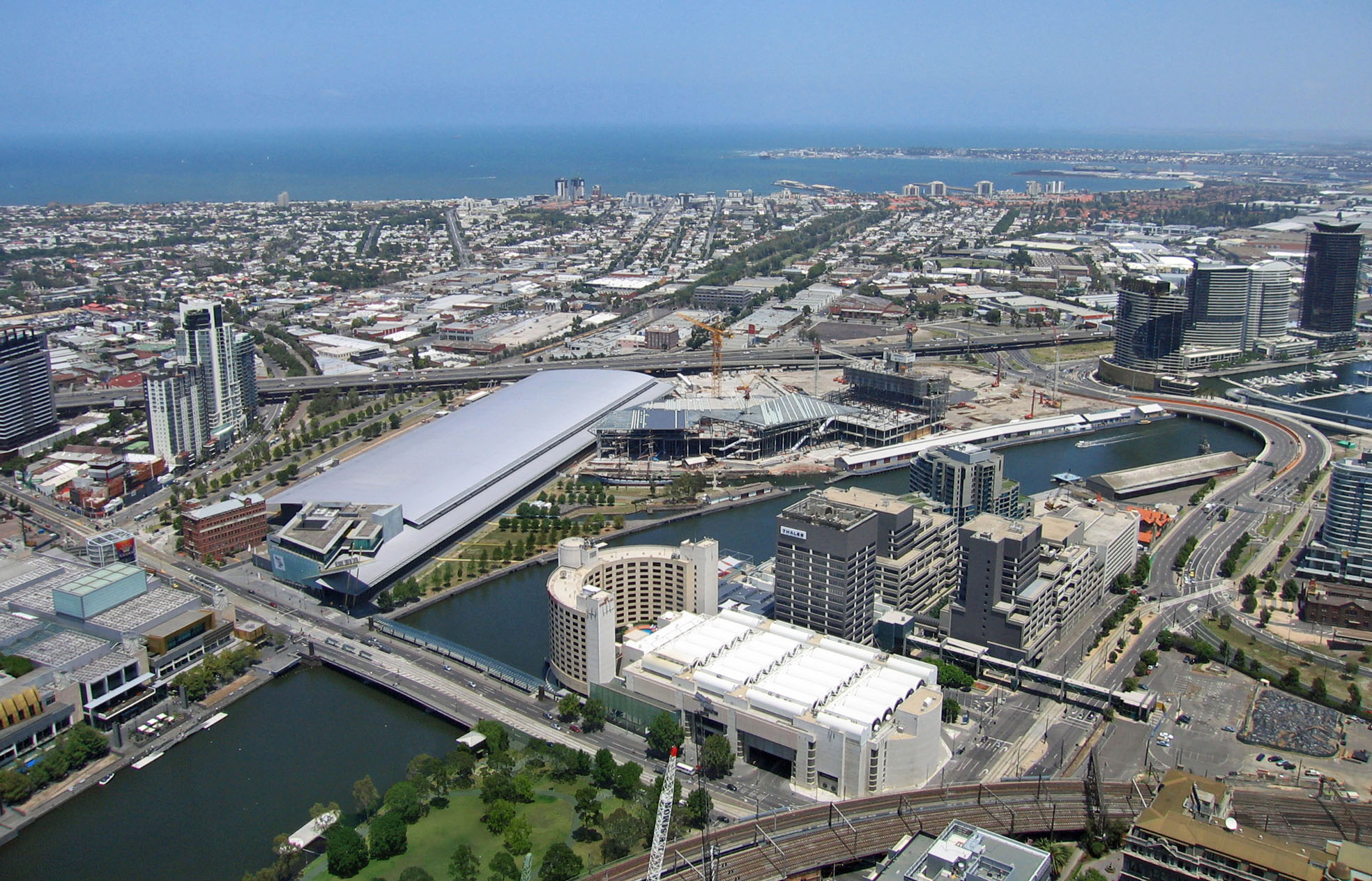
Port Phillip Bay in the distance, viewed from the Rialto Towers observation deck in Melbourne's city centre, with the Yarra River intersecting between the bay and the city.

Port Phillip, sometimes referred to as Port Phillip Bay, is a large bay in southern Victoria, Australia, 1,930 km^{2} (476,900 acres) in area, with a coastline length of 264 km (164 mi). The bay is extremely shallow for its size, but mostly navigable. The deepest portion is only 24 m (80 ft), and half the region is shallower than 8 m. Its volume is around 25 km^{3}. The city of Melbourne is located at its northern end, near the mouth of the Yarra River.

Port Phillip is home to a vast array of geographic features typically found in bays, such as beaches, points, islands and smaller bays, as well as being the drainage point of many major rivers and creeks in Central Victoria. All features here are listed clockwise from the mouth of the Yarra River.

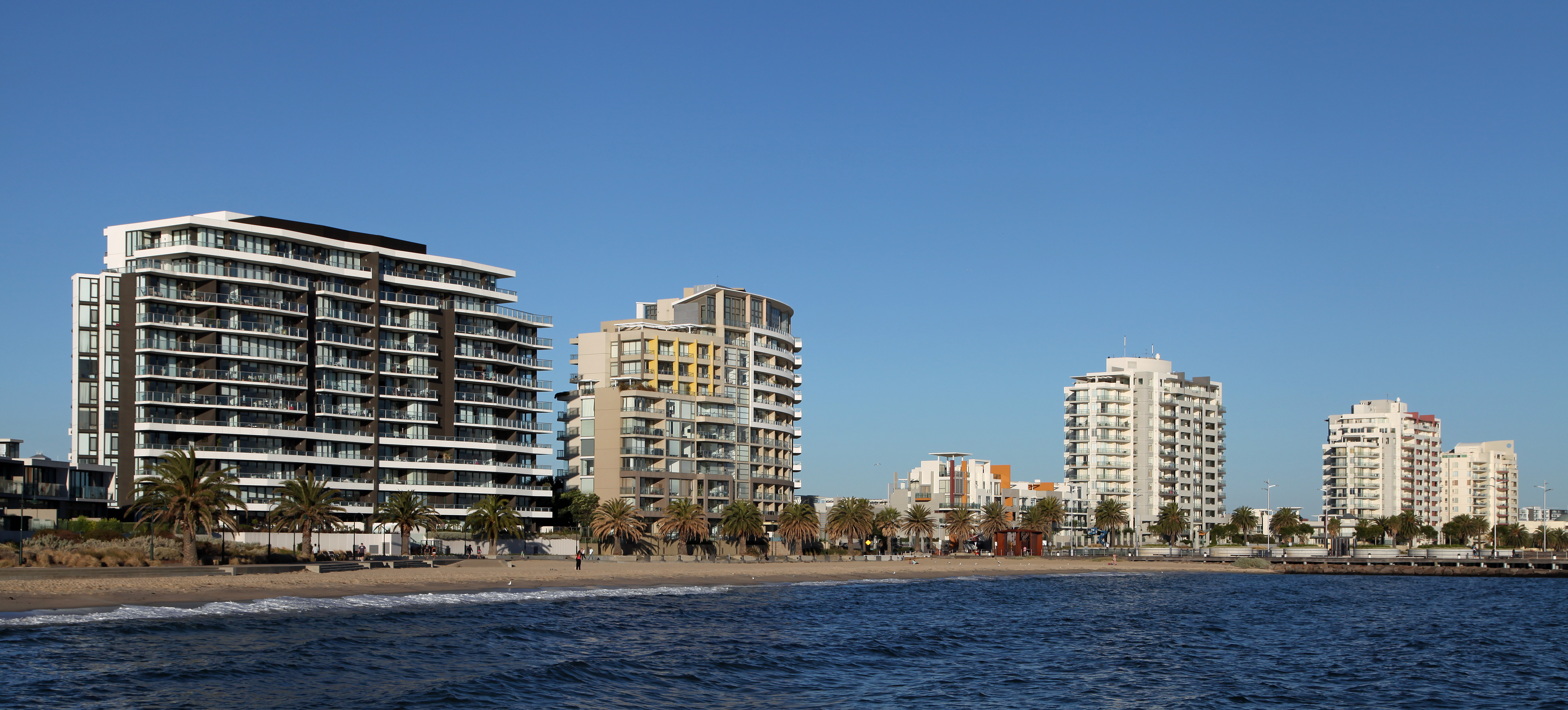
Beacon Cove beach and exclusive apartments in Port Melbourne

== Beaches ==
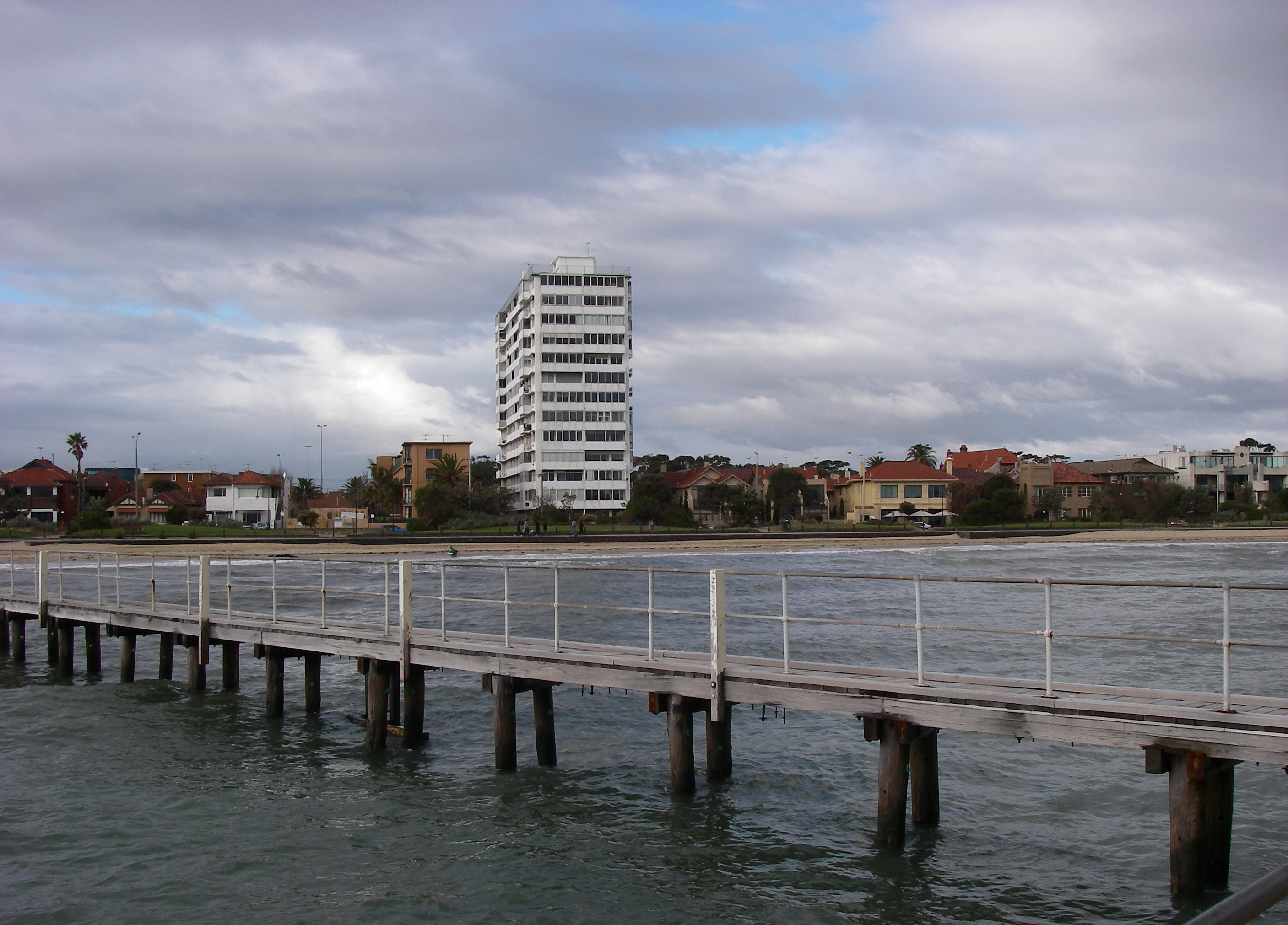
View of St. Kilda Beach from a short pier. (2009)

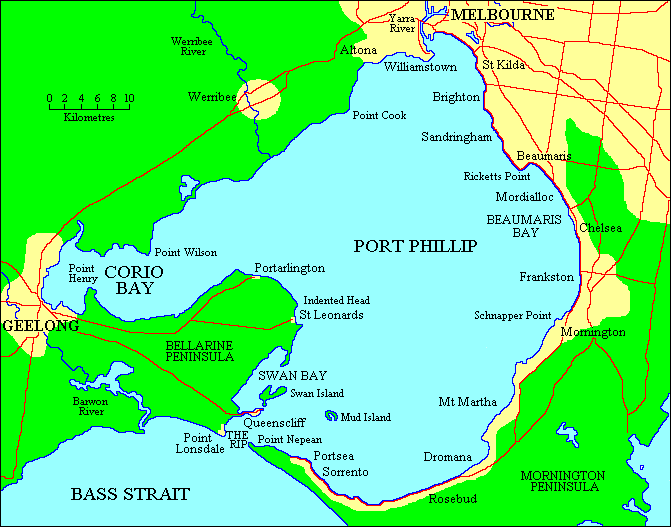

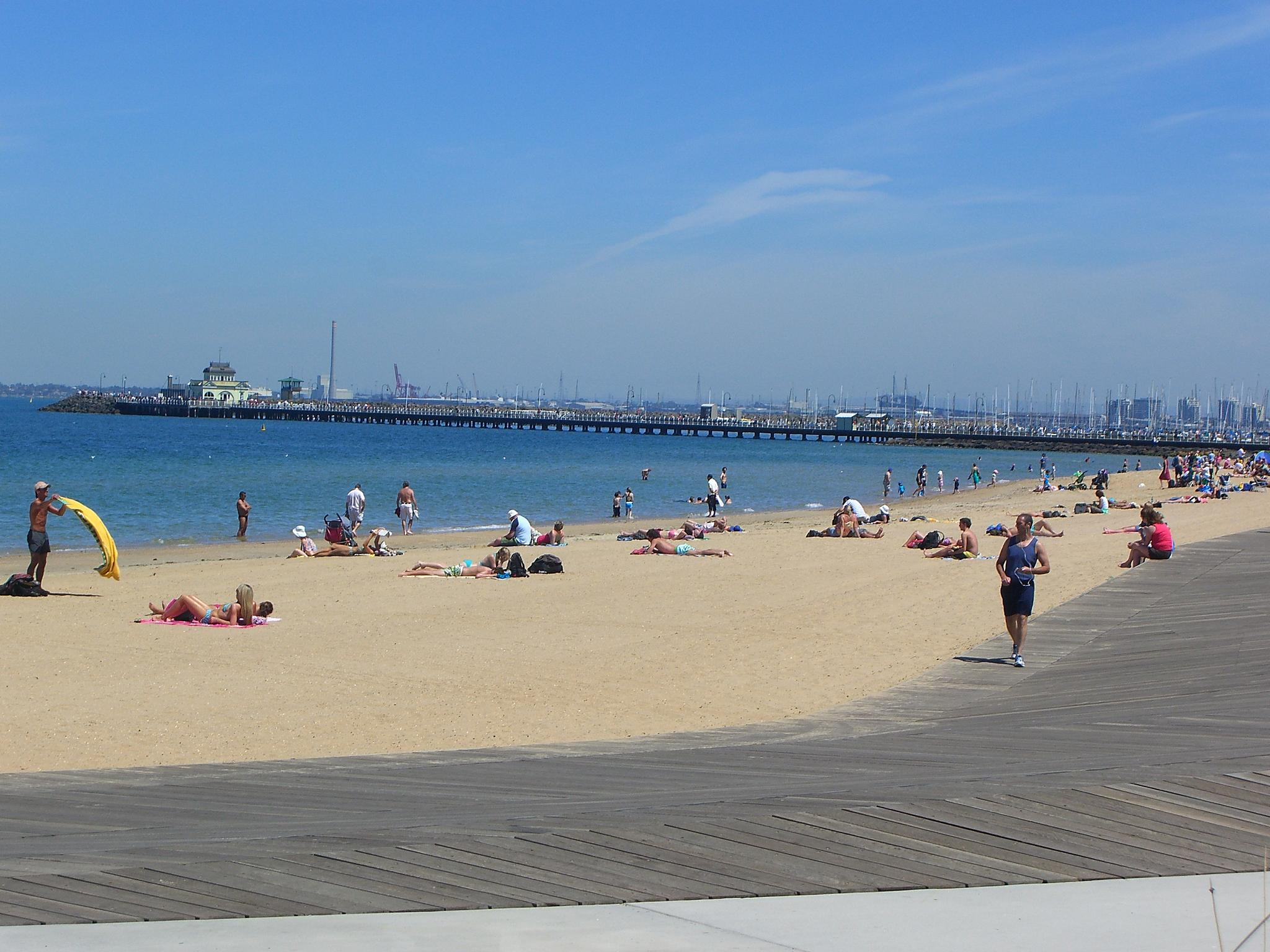
View of St Kilda Beach and pier

Port Phillip hosts many beaches, most of which are flat, shallow and long, with very small breaks making swimming quite safe. This attracts many tourists, mostly families, to the beaches of Port Phillip during the summer months and school holidays. Water sports such as body boarding and surfing are difficult or impossible, except in extreme weather conditions. Most sandy beaches are located on the bay's northern, eastern and southern shorelines, while the western shorelines host a few sandy beaches, there mostly exists a greater variety of beaches, swampy wetlands and mangroves. The occasional pebble beach and rocky cliffs can also be found, mostly in the southern reaches. Major beaches include:

=== Hobsons Bay ===
In Hobsons Bay there are:

- Sandridge Beach – Port Melbourne
- Port Melbourne Beach – Port Melbourne
- South Melbourne Beach – Albert Park

West Beach – St Kilda West

- St Kilda Beach – St Kilda

=== Between Hobsons and Beaumaris Bays ===
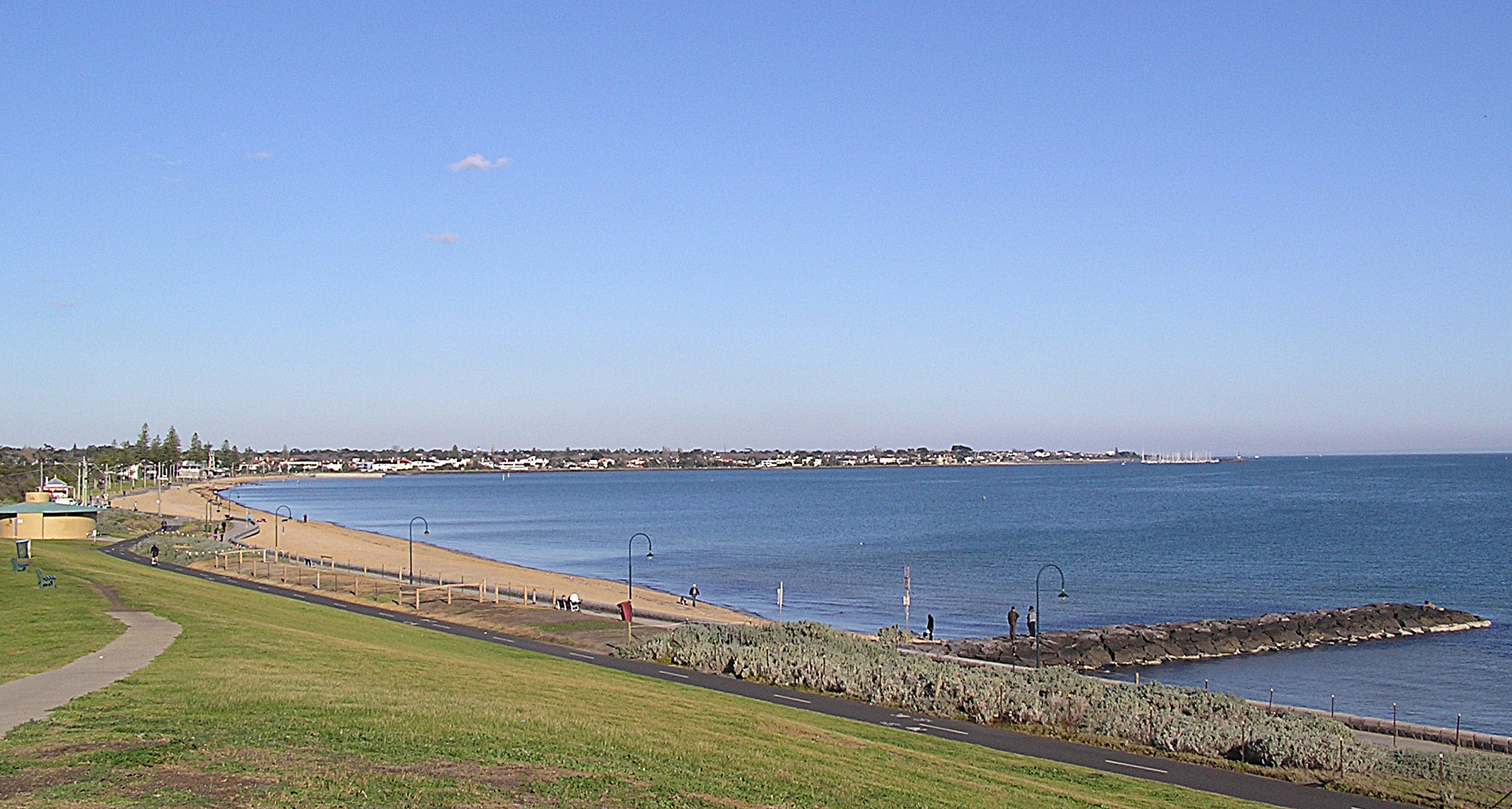
Elwood Beach and Port Philip

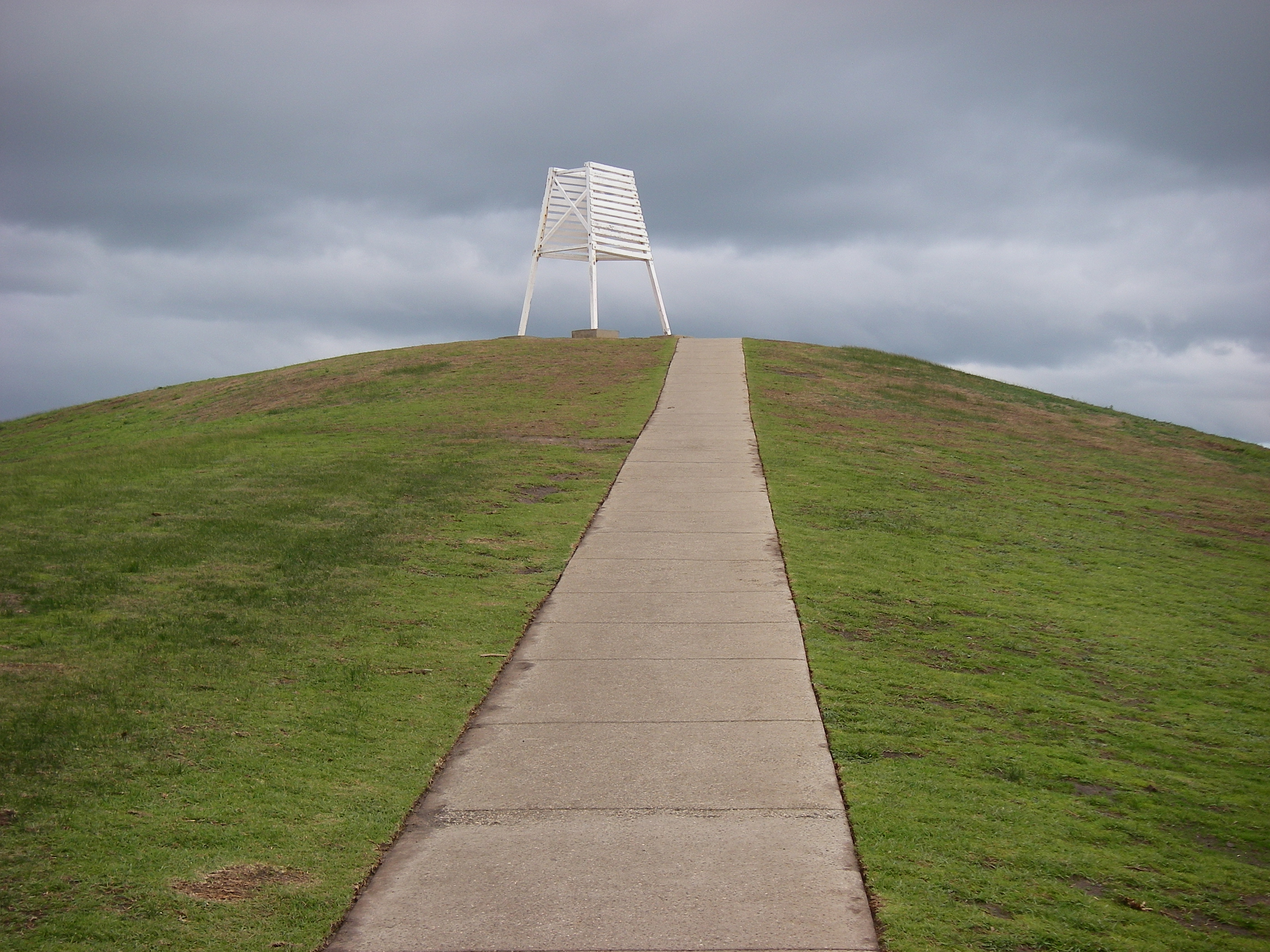
Point Ormond near Elwood, Victoria (2009)

- Elwood Beach – Elwood
- Seacombe Grove Beach – Brighton
- Middle Brighton Beach – Brighton
- Dendy Street Beach – Brighton
- Brighton Beach – Brighton
- Hampton Beach – Hampton
- Sandringham Beach – Sandringham
- Half Moon Bay Beach – Black Rock
- Black Rock Beach – Black Rock
- Ricketts Point Beach – Beaumaris

Watkins Bay Beach
Keefers Cove Beach

=== Beaumaris Bay ===
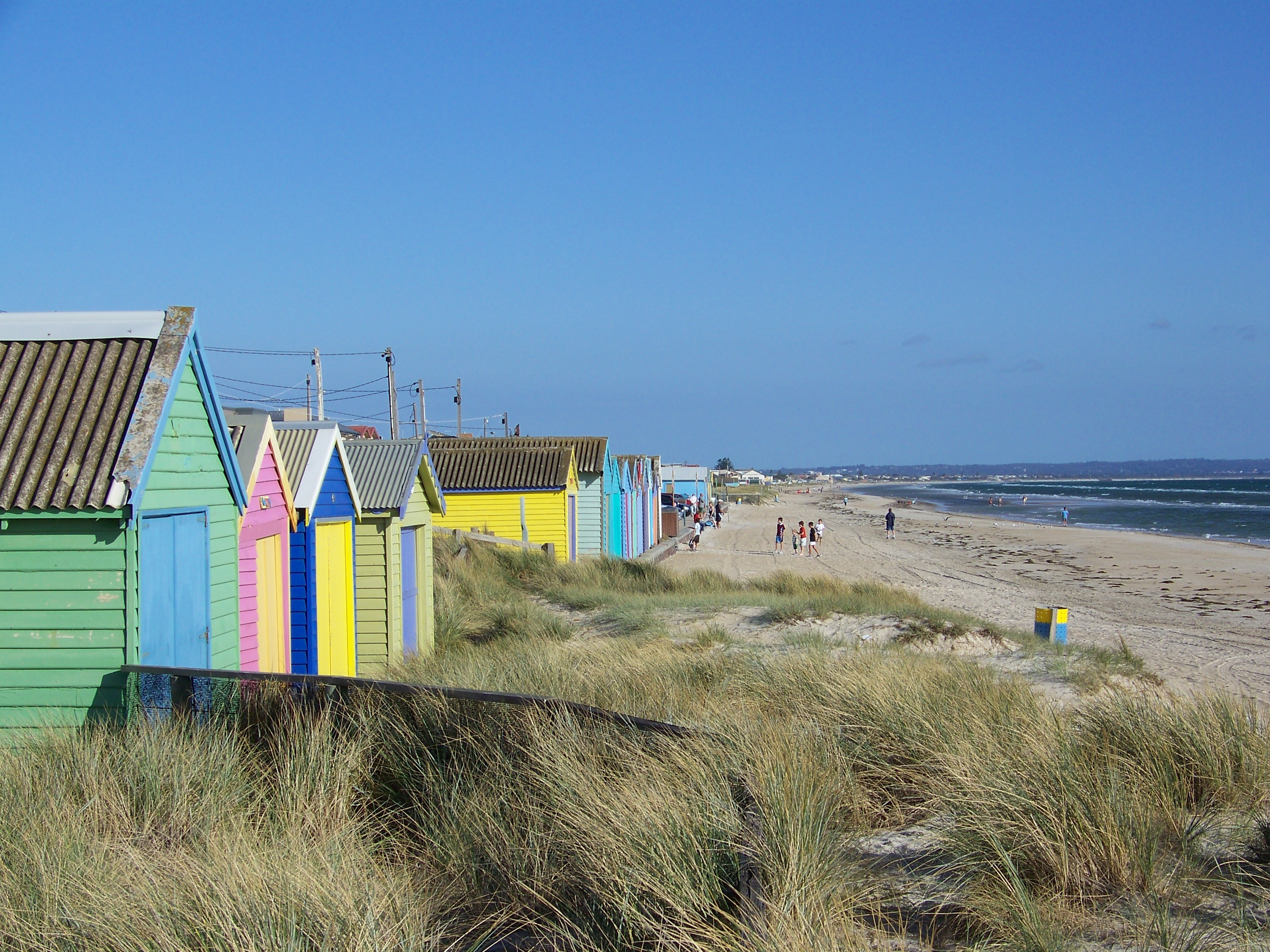
The beach at Aspendale has several colourful beach huts.

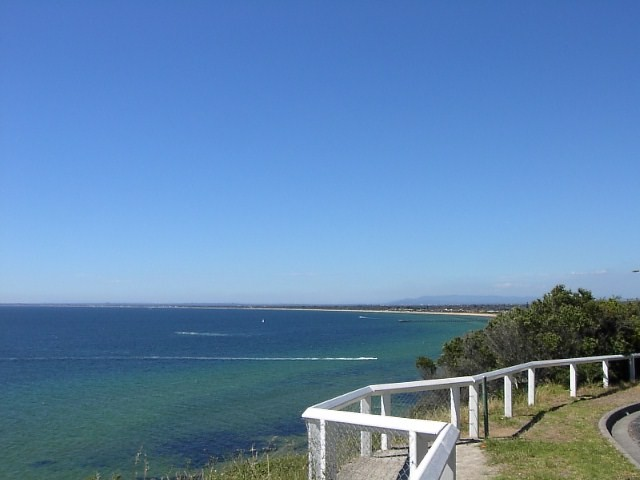
Port Phillip as seen from Olivers Hill, Frankston on the eastern shore of the bay

In Beaumaris Bay there are:

- Mentone Beach – Mentone
- Parkdale Beach – Parkdale
- Mordialloc Beach – Mordialloc
- Aspendale Beach – Aspendale
- Edithvale Beach – Edithvale
- Chelsea Beach – Chelsea
- Bonbeach Beach – Bonbeach
- Carrum Beach – Carrum
- Seaford Beach – Seaford

Long Island Beach

- Frankston Beach – Frankston
- South Frankston Beach – Frankston/Frankston South

=== Between Beaumaris and Dromana Bays ===
- Daveys Bay Beach – Mount Eliza
- Mount Eliza Beach – Mount Eliza

Canadian Bay Beach

- Half Moon Bay Beach – Mount Eliza
- Ranelagh Beach – Mount Eliza
- Moondah Beach – Mount Eliza
- Sunnyside North Beach – Mount Eliza
- Sunnyside Beach – Mount Eliza
- Mills Beach – Mornington

Mills Beach East

- Shire Hall Beach – Mornington
- Mothers Beach – Mornington
- Royal Beach – Mornington
- Fishermans Beach – Mornington
- Fosters Beach – Mornington

Fosters Slip

- Fossil Beach – Mornington
- Dava Beach – Mount Martha
- Birdrock Beach – Mount Martha
- Craigie Beach – Mount Martha
- Hawker Beach – Mount Martha
- Mount Martha Beach North – Mount Martha
- Mount Martha Beach South – Mount Martha

=== Dromana Bay ===
- Pebble Cove Beach – Mount Martha
- Safety Beach – Safety Beach
- Dromana Beach – Dromana

Anthonys Nose Beach – Dromana

=== Capel Sound ===
- McCrae Beach – McCrae
- Rosebud Beach – Rosebud
- Rosebud West Beach – Rosebud West
- Tootgarook Beach – Tootgarook
- Rye Beach – Rye

Rye Beach East
Rye Beach West

- Tyrone Beach – Rye
- Blairgowrie Beach – Blairgowrie
- Camerons Bight Beach – Sorrento
- Sullivan Bay Beach – Sorrento
- Sorrento Front Beach – Sorrento
- Policemans Point Beach – Sorrento

=== Corio Bay ===
In Corio Bay there are:

- Point Henry Beaches – Moolap
- Eastern Beach – Geelong
- Western Beach – Geelong
- Rippleside Beach – Rippleside
- St Helens Beach – North Geelong
- Limeburners Bay Beach – Corio
- Avalon Beach – Avalon

=== Between Corio and Altona Bays ===
Much of this coastline is undeveloped and is occupied by either military facilities or the Western Treatment Plant.

- Werribee South Beach – Werribee South
- East Beach – Werribee South
- Wyndham Harbour South Beach – Werribee South
- Wyndham Harbour North Beach – Werribee South
- Campbells Cove Beaches – Werribee South

=== Altona Bay ===
- Altona Beach – Altona
- Seaholme Beach – Seaholme
- Williamstown Beach – Williamstown
- Shelley Beach – Williamstown

== Landforms ==
=== Islands and reefs ===
- Long Island
- Wooleys Reef
- Pelican Point Reef
- Hovell Pile
- South Channel Pile (artificial)
- South Channel Fort
- Mud Islands
- Pope's Eye (incomplete fort)
- Chinaman's Hat (artificial)
- Nepean Reef
- Sand Island
- Swan Island
- Stingaree Island
- Mangrove Island
- Rabbit Island
- Tip Island
- Duck Island
- West Channel Pile
- Mudlands

Great Sand
Middle Ground
South Sand
Popes Eye Bank
Middle Sand
William Sand
West Sand

=== Points ===
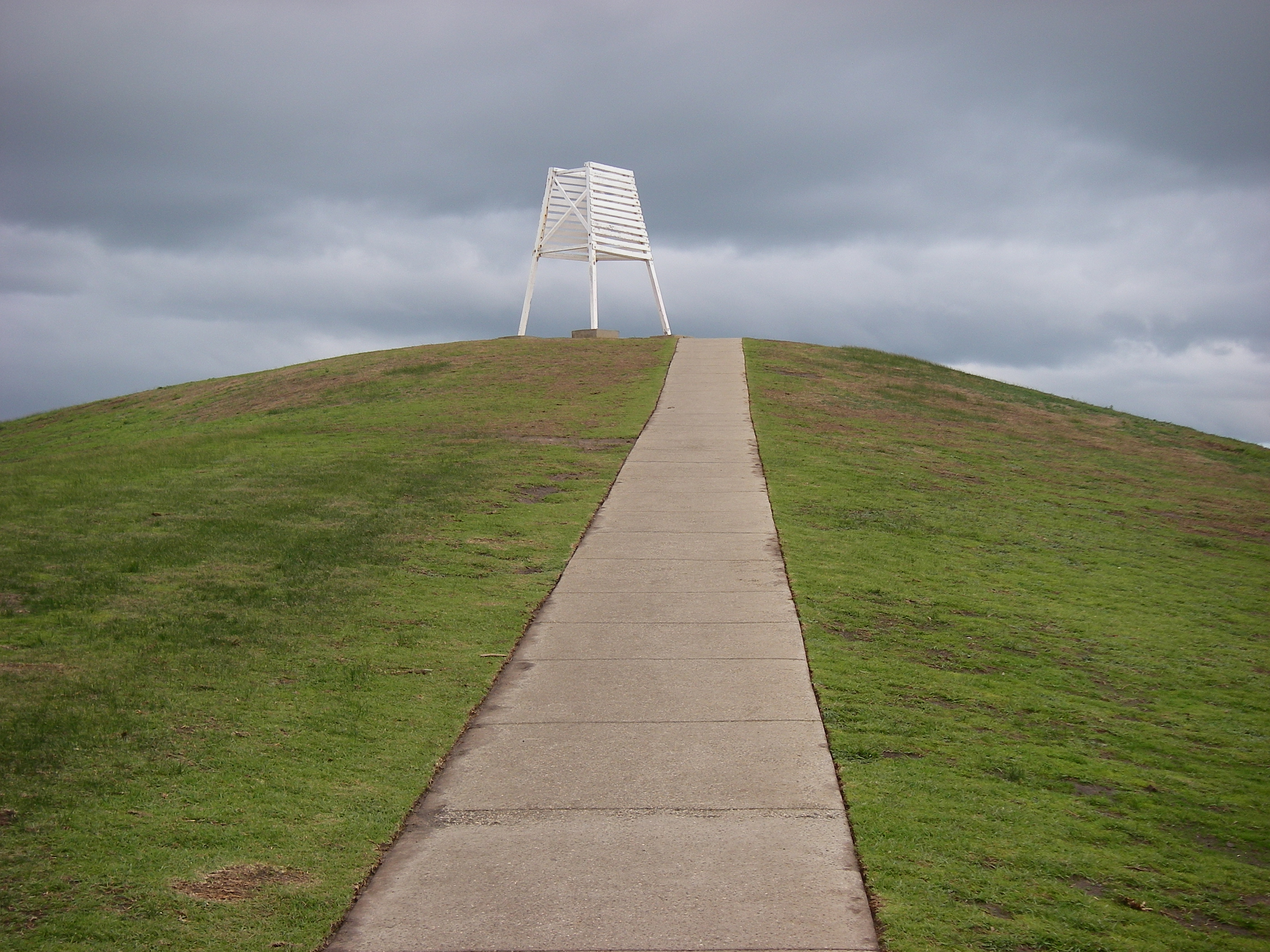
Point Ormond near Elwood, Victoria (2009)

- Point Ormond
- Green Point
- Picnic Point (Sandringham)
- Red Bluff
- Quiet Corner
- Ricketts Point
- Table Rock Point
- Olivers Hill
- Pelican Point
- Shnapper Point (Mornington)
- Linley Point
- Balcombe Point
- Martha Point (Mount Martha)
- Anthonys Nose (Dromana)
- White Cliffs
- Eastern Sister
- Western Sister
- Policemans Point (Sorrento)
- Point King
- Point McArthur
- Point Franklin (Portsea)
- Police Point
- Observatory Point
- Point Nepean
- The Rip
- Point Lonsdale
- Shortlands Bluff (Queenscliff)
- The Cut
- Swan Point (Swan Island)
- Burnt Point
- Edwards Point
- The Bluff
- Indented Head
- Point George
- Grassy Point
- Point Richards (Portarlington)
- Beacon Point
- Point Henry
- Limeburners Point
- Point Lillias
- Point Wilson
- Kirk Point
- Point Cooke
- Point Gellibrand (Williamstown)

== Bays ==
The following is a list of bays, sorted in a clockwise direction, from the mouth, west to east.

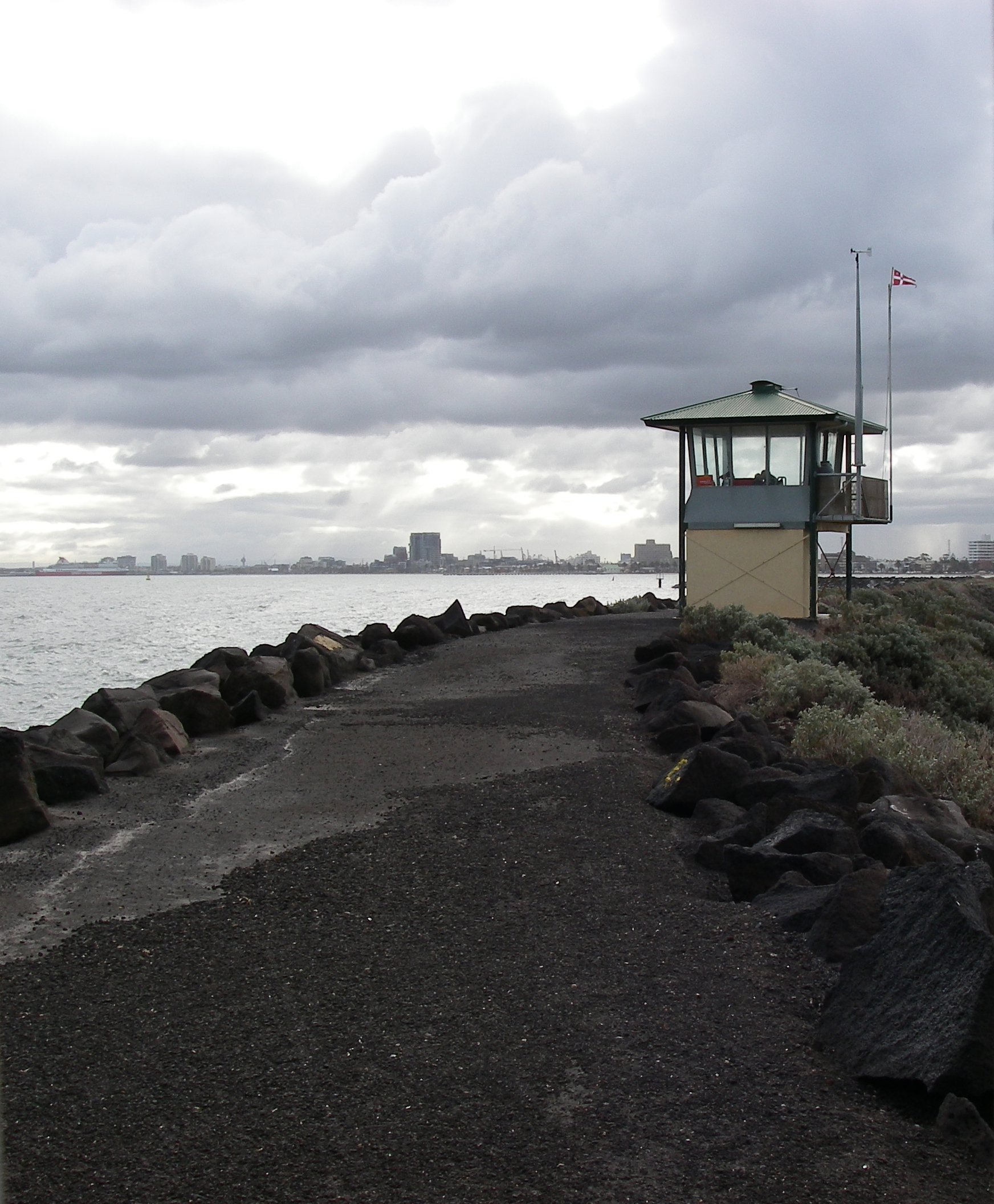
Royal Melbourne Yacht Squadron's Starter's Tower St. Kilda Breakwater, 2009

Bay mouth

- The Rip
  - Lonsdale Bay

Near Geelong

- Swan Bay (very shallow at low tide)
- Salt Lagoon
- Hood Bight
- Half Moon Bay (Indented Head)
- Outer Harbour
- Stingaree Bight
- The Spit
  - Corio Bay
    - Stingaree Bay
    - Steampacket Quay
    - Corio Quay
    - Limeburners Bay

Near Werribee

- Campbells Cove
- Altona Bay
  - Shelley Bay

Near Port Melbourne / Albert Park / St Kilda / Black Rock

- Hobsons Bay
  - Greenwich Bay
  - Beacon Cove
- Elwood Bay
- Hampton Bay
- Half Moon (Black Rock)

Near Mordialloc / Bonbeach / Frankstown

- Watkins Bay
- Beaumaris Bay
  - Keefers Cove

On the Mornington Peninsula

- Daveys Bay
- Half Moon Bay (Mount Eliza)
- Canadian Bay
- Mornington Bay
- Dromana Bay
  - Pebble Cove
  - Martha Cove
    - Marina Cove
- Capel Sound
  - Camerons Bight
  - Sullivan Bay, as Collins settlement site
  - Sorrento Bay
- Collins Bay
- Weeroona Bay
- Ticonderoga Bay
- Nepean Bay
  - The Bend

== Confluents ==
- Yarra River – Newport/Port Melbourne
  - Maribyrnong River
- Sandridge Lagoon (now filled in) – Port Melbourne
- Elster Creek – Elwood
- Mordialloc Creek – Mordialloc
- Patterson River – Carrum
- Kananook Creek – Frankston
- Sweetwater Creek – Frankston South
- Kackeraboite Creek – Mount Eliza
- Ballar Creek – Mount Eliza
- Earimil Creek – Mount Eliza
- Gunyong Creek – Mount Eliza
- Manmangur Creek – Mount Eliza
- Caraar Creek – Mornington
- Tanti Creek – Mornington
- Balcombe Creek – Mount Martha
- Hearn Creek – Mount Martha
- Tassells Creek – Safety Beach
- Dunns Creek – Safety Beach
- Sheepwash Creek – Safety Beach
- Coburn Creek – McCrae
- Chinamans Creek – Rosebud West
- The Rip
- Yarram Creek – Swan Bay
- Frederick Mason Creek – St Leonards
- St Leonards Creek – St Leonards
- Cowies creek – North Geelong
- Cuthbertson Creek – North Shore
- Hovells Creek – Corio
- Little River – Point Wilson
- Werribee River – Cocoroc/Werribee South
- Skeleton Creek – Point Cook
- Laverton Creek – Altona
- Cherry Creek – Seaholme
- Kororoit Creek – Williamstown North

== Other features ==
- Portsea Hole

== Marine Parks ==
- Port Phillip Heads Marine National Park
