= Athenaeum Theatre, Sorrento =

Former movie theatre in Melbourne, Australia

Athenaeum Theatre
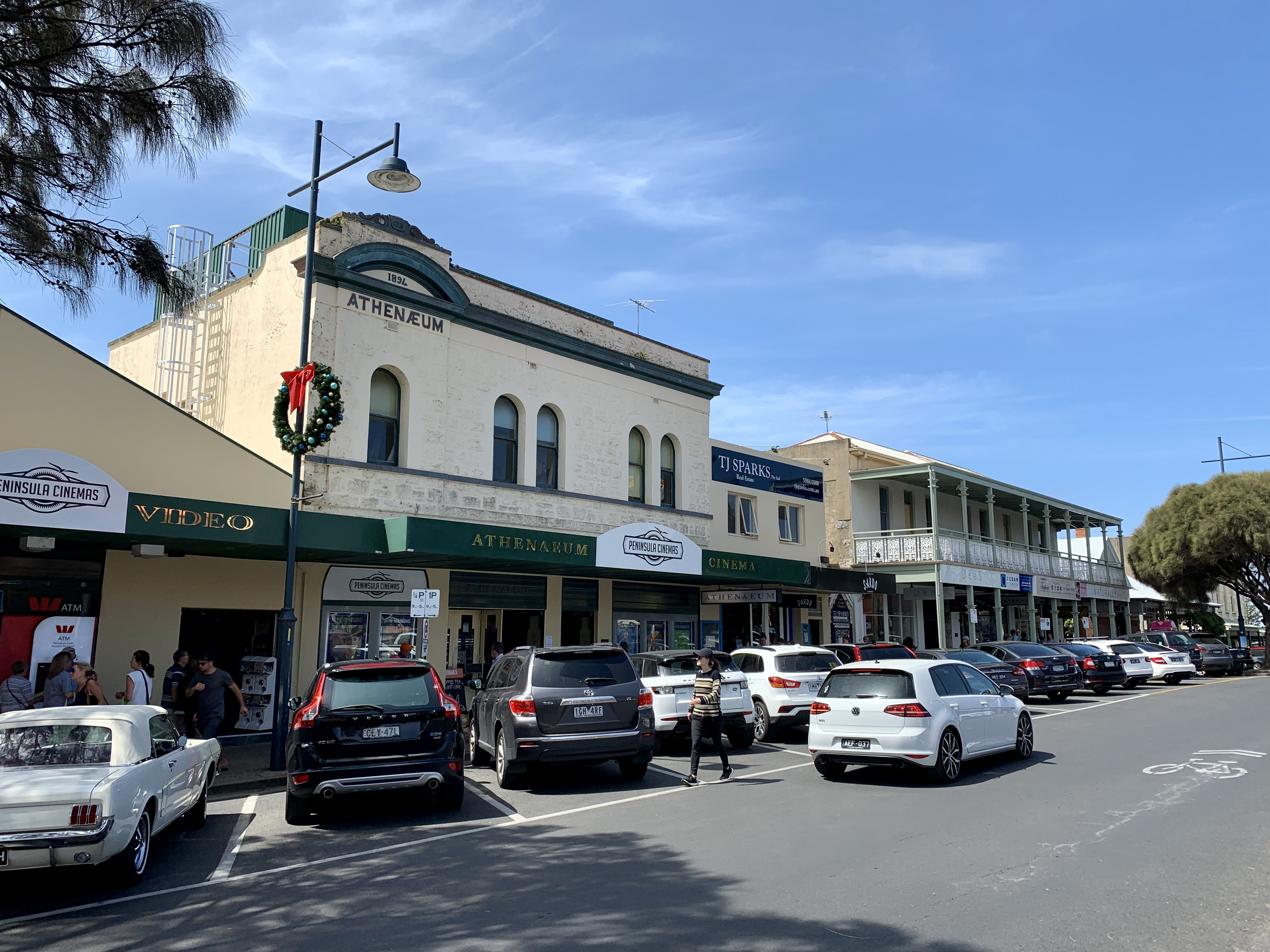
- The theatre in 2018, prior to its closure

- Location of the former theatre in Greater Metropolitan Melbourne
- Interactive map of Athenaeum Theatre
- Former names: Athenaeum Hall; Sorrento Cinema; Athenaeum Picture Theatre; Athenaeum Pictures; Sorrento Athenaeum Cinemas; Peninsula Cinemas Sorrento
- Location: 26 Ocean Beach Road, Sorrento, Mornington Peninsula, Melbourne, Victoria, Australia
- Coordinates: 38°20′20″S 144°44′26″E
- Owner: Isaac Bensilum (1894–c. 1920); Kelly and Dave Macfarlan (c. 1920–1949); Kirby family (1949–2017); Colin Delutis (since 2022)
- Operator: I. Bensilum (1894–c. 1920); K. & D. McFarlane (c. 1920–1922); J. A. C. Keil (1922–1932); D. McFarlane (1932–1949); G. J. Kirby/Village Cinemas (1949–2017); Peninsula Cinemas (2017–2025)
- Capacity: c. 500 – c. 592
- Type: Multi-purpose theatre
- Screens: 1 (1894–1997); 3 (since 1997)
- Acreage: 1,123 m^{2} (12,090 sq ft) [site]

Construction
- Opened: 1894; 132 years ago
- Renovated: 1932
- Expanded: 1997
- Closed: 25 April 2023
- Years active: 1894–2023
- Architects: J. F. Gibbins (1894); Cowper, Murphy & Associates (1950)

Site notes
- Material: Limestone; brick; Kauri pine; marble
- Architectural styles: Edwardian (1894, interior); Italianate (1894, exterior); Moderne (1932, interior)

Victorian Heritage Register
- Official name: Athenaeum
- Type: Registred place
- Designated: 9 September 2010
- Reference no.: H2227
- Heritage overlay no.: HO29

Register of the National Estate
- Official name: The Athenaeum Theatre
- Type: Defunct register
- Designated: undated
- Reference no.: 103098

The Athenaeum Theatre, or simply, The Athenaeum and previously, the Athenaeum Hall, is a former cinema theatre, located at 26 Ocean Beach Road in Sorrento, on the Mornington Peninsula, in the south eastern suburbs of Melbourne, in Victoria, Australia. The building was used as an entertainment venue from 1894 until its closure in 2023.

The theatre was added to the Victorian Heritage Register on 9 September 2010 in recognition of its architectural and historical significance; and was also added to non-statutory lists by the Victorian branch of the National Trust on 3 June 1996 and the now defunct Register of the National Estate on an unknown date.

== History ==
The Athenaeum theatre was built in 1894 in the commercial centre of Sorrento, a popular destination in the 1880s. Designed by Melbourne architect, J. F. Gibbins, the multi-purpose theatrical venue was built for Isaac Bensilu, a local councillor, hotelier and entrepreneur, who owned the Continental Hotel, that advertised from c. 1899 that it was "The only Hotel in the Colonies to have refrigerated ice."

The Athenaeum was the home of travelling shows throughout the year with noted artists performing while on holiday in the summer. The theatre hosted various forms of entertainment, including public lectures, wedding receptions, balls and dances, skating, and was used as a venue for community and church meetings. Silent films were shown in the auditorium from 1918, from a newly installed bio-box and, after Kelly and Dave Macfarlane took ownership, talking pictures were shown by 1932. This coincided with Moderne alterations made to the building and the introduction of new equipment.

Improvements to the foyer, the addition of a milkbar, a new projection room, and a small balcony were completed in 1950, (Note: The date was sourced from the Cinema and Theatre Historical Society of Australia. However, both the VHR and the defunct RNE state that the date of these modifications was unknown.) attributed to Cowper, Murphy & Associates, a year after the Kirby family took ownership. The Athenaeum Theatre was one the Kirby family's first cinemas that they grew to become Village Cinemas. Digitisation of the screens took effect between c. 2010 – c. 2011. The Kirby family sold the site in 2017 and leased the theatre from the new local owner. In 2022, the site was acquired by Colin Delutis, a property developer. The cinema closed on 25 April 2023, and the last film screened was Hotel Sorrento. In 2023, Delutis made an application to the Heritage Council of Victoria for redevelopment of the site, including partial demolition of the theatre.

== Description ==
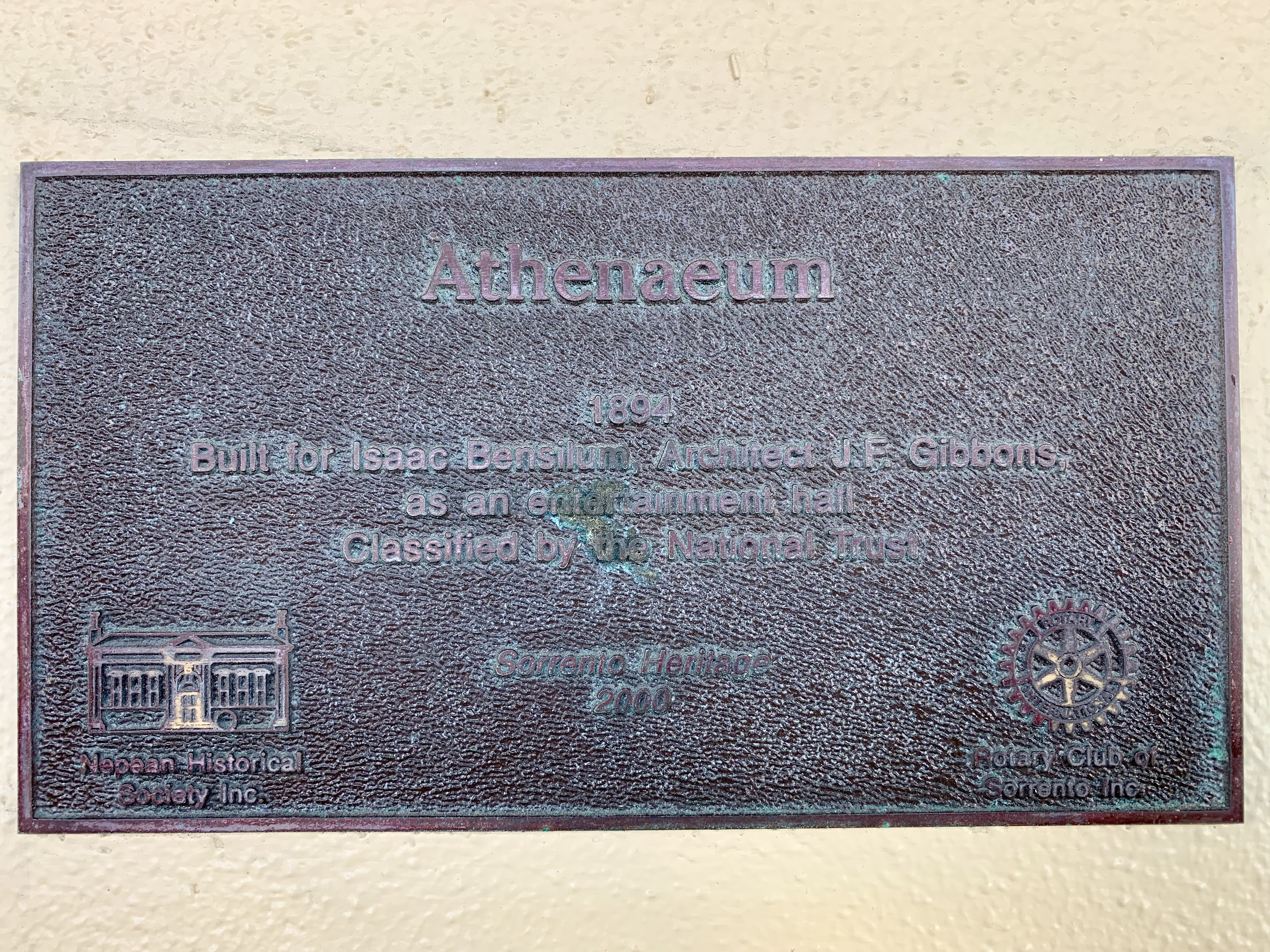
A plaque about the theatre, in 2018

The Athenaeum is a two-storey Edwardian hall constructed from rough hewn local limestone with brick dressings. The building comprised an auditorium with Kauri pine floors for dancing, a foyer, retiring rooms, a deep stage with dressing and store rooms beneath, and two shops with residences above.

The front elevation is a simply-detailed Victorian Italianate facade, with a heavy cornice which runs across the facade below the parapet. This incorporates a segmental arch detail placed at one extreme end with a raised decorative scroll on the parapet above. The grouping of first floor windows is also irregular, and the resulting front facade is therefore unusually asymmetrical in appearance. The corbelled course marking the base of the parapet subtends a circular pediment at the southern corner of the building which is inscribed with the 1894 date and name. To the north is a post-war addition which may correspond in date with the refacing of the lower floor of the theatre. The southern ground floor window contains the beginnings of an arch in the highlight section which suggest the alteration of a previous arched window.

Internally, there are still many of the decorative details of the original cinema design with an intact stage and screen, and later Moderne detailing. Various alterations have been made to the building since the 1930s, however the original 1894 building form remains largely intact. Original features include the cast metal seating in the auditorium that features a large cornice, simple pilasters, and three deep plaster domes–set into a ceiling of panelled, floral plasterwork–and similar plasterwork also lines the proscenium wall. Moderne styled plasterwork was added between the pilasters of the side walls. The foyer entrance contains a bank of Moderne doors, with a frosted glass strip above incorporating the word 'Athenaeum'. The foyer is altered in its surface finishes and leads to a marble courtyard towards the rear which is surrouded by high walls and planted with miniature palms.

Extensive renovations to the building in 1997 included repainting, the installation of new fittings, including lights in the Moderne style, the insertion of a wide screen in front of the early proscenium, the curtaining of the auditorium walls and the addition of two new cinemas in an adjoining building. The building was used exclusively as a permanent cinema from 1918 to 2023.

== See also ==
- Architecture of Melbourne
- List of places on the Victorian Heritage Register in the Shire of Mornington Peninsula
- List of theatres in Melbourne
