= Whitehall Guesthouse =

Early 20th century Australian guesthouse

Coordinates: 38.34425°S 144.732178°E

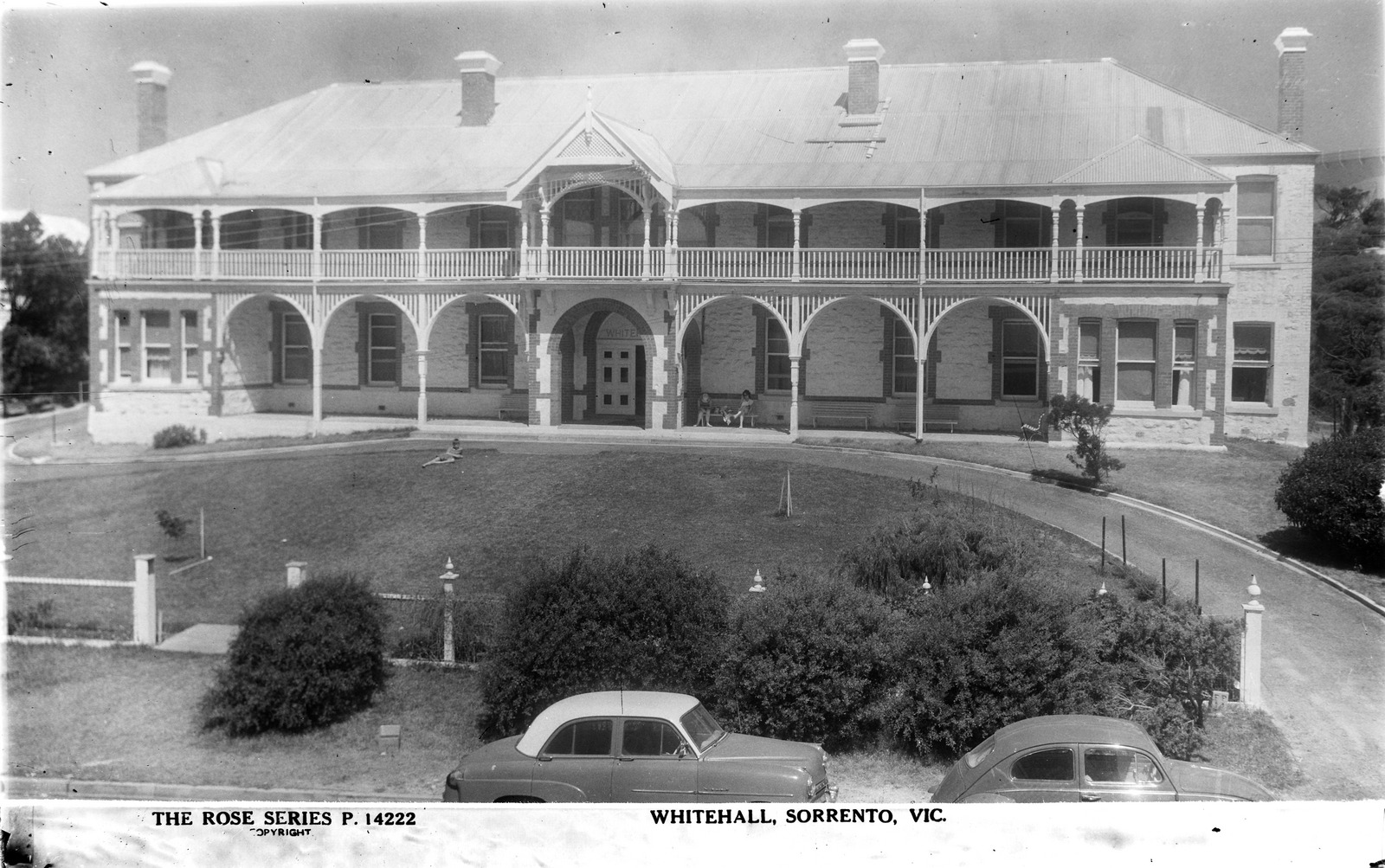
Whitehall Guesthouse in the 1950s

Whitehall is an historic guest house located at the 'back' (ocean) beach in Sorrento, a holiday town on the Mornington Peninsula near Melbourne, in Victoria, Australia.

== History ==
Sorrento became a popular holiday destination when paddle steamers began regular trips across Port Phillip Bay from Port Melbourne in 1875. The 'back beach', across the narrow peninsula facing the ocean became accessible in 1890 when a steam tram operated from there to the Sorrento foreshore and pier. At the same time the large Back Beach Palace was built at the terminus, facing the beach. It was joined in 1904 by the Whitehall Guesthouse across the road, built for James Dunlop Allen, who ran it with his daughter until 1949. Whitehall was one of many guesthouses in Portsea and Sorrento, but by the 1950s it was the last one operating in Sorrento.

During World War II it was made available to families of servicemen by the Royal Australian Navy (RAN), who then purchased the property in the summer of 1950 to provide accommodation for families of former Royal Navy men, but by 1952 advertised it for sale after paying £31,400. It was purchased by the Dunkley family whose oldest son had just completed service with the British Commonwealth Occupation Force in Japan. In 1983 it was sold to Dr. Ian McGoldrick, who later sold in about 2010 to architect Kevin Greenhatch, in partnership with Ros Harvey. In 2016 they sold it, but the purchaser passed away and it was put up for sale again in 2017. In 2023 it is still operating as a 31-room conference venue and guesthouse, possibly 'the largest and oldest still operating guest house in Victoria'.

== Facilities ==
Whitehall originally had accommodation for around 120 people. Most rooms contain a single or double bed and a set of drawers and wardrobe. Bathrooms were originally all communal, with a men's and women's on each level. The first floor rooms facing Back Beach Road have windows onto the full-length balcony. A narrow passageway between rooms provide verandah access to all guests. Downstairs, the rooms facing the road are larger, and like those above them, had fireplaces. At either end of the ground floor is the lounge room and the billiard room, both with fireplaces. The dining room and ballroom share the transept, perpendicular to the rest. At the rear, under a separate roofline is the kitchen, servery, laundry, staff eating area, preparation area, store rooms and refrigeration including a cool room replete with solid wooden door with a long metal lever arm to press the door closed ensuring an airtight seal. Outside were several wooden garages, a workshop, a room housing a potato-peeling machine, and washing mops. Behind them stands a limestone row of rooms used up until the 1970s as sleeping quarters for male staff. In the 1960s the Dunkleys built female staff quarters parallel to the men's, set into the hill.

Limestone is a soft material, easily worn away by wind and rain. To prevent deterioration to the southern wall, the national park next door was planted out with pines and cypress, which were removed after 40 years in a campaign to reinstate indigenous plants.
