= Collins settlement site =

Archaeological site in Melbourne, Australia

- 1803 Collins settlement site
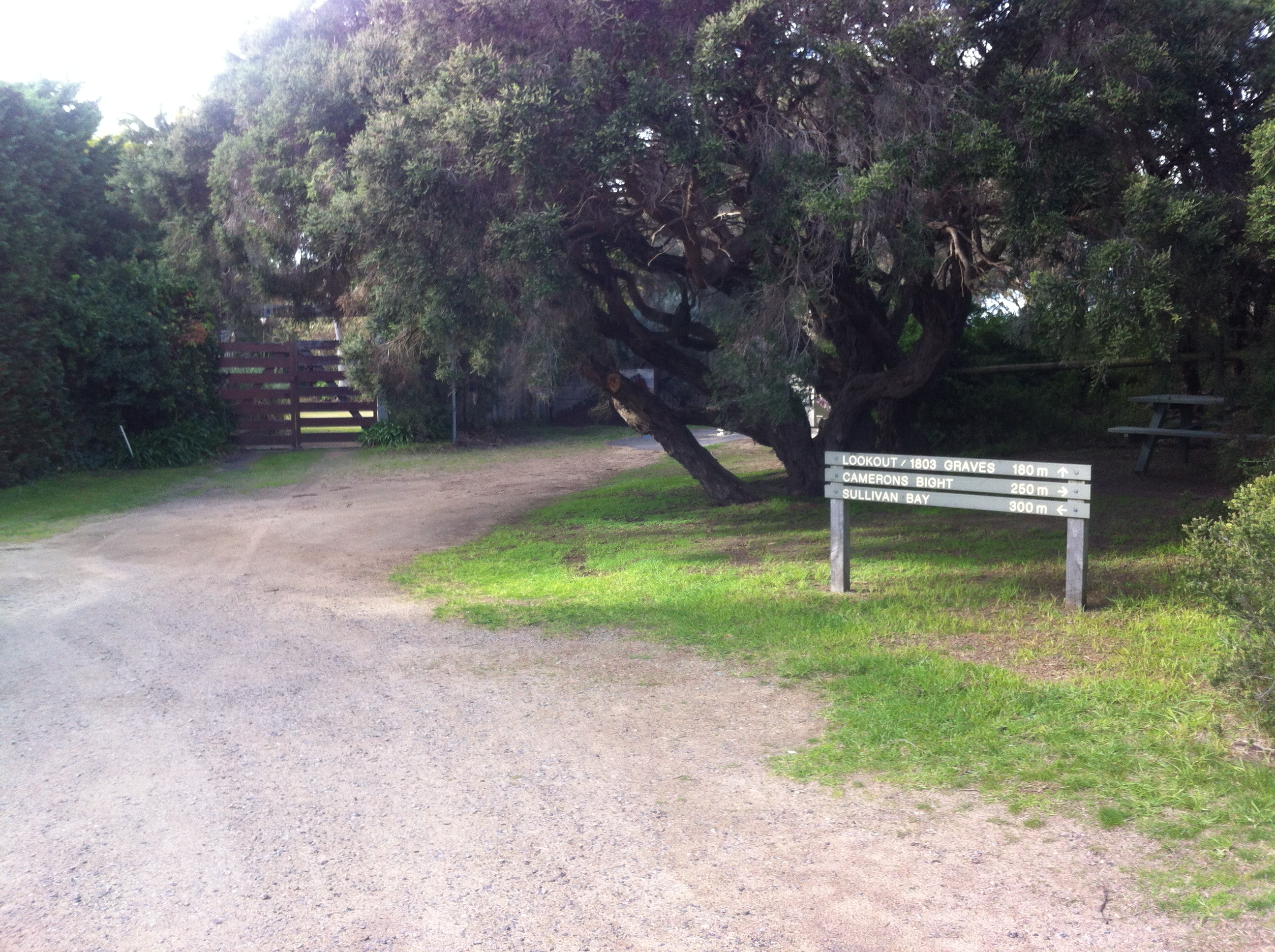
- Entrance to the lookout and graves, 2013

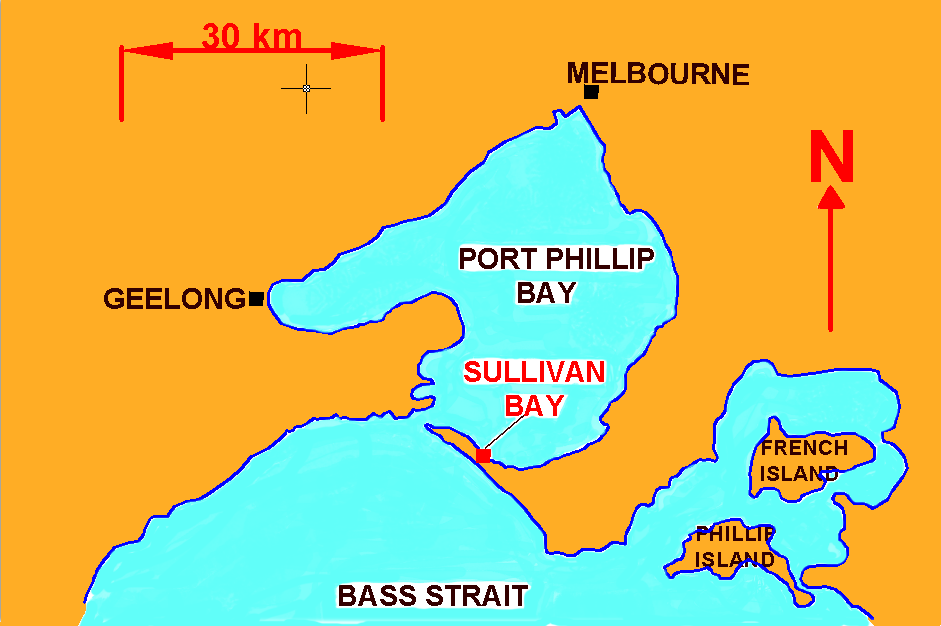
- A map of Port Phillip, marking Sullivan Bay, the settlement site, relative to Melbourne, Geelong, and Western Port

- Location of the settlement site in Greater Metropolitan Melbourne
- Interactive map of Collins settlement site
- 38°20′59″S 144°45′43″E
- Type: Colonial settlement site; Archaeological site
- Etymology: Colonel David Collins, RN
- Associated with: Bunerong Bulak people
- Location: Point Nepean Road, Sorrento, Mornington Peninsula, Melbourne, Victoria, Australia

History
- Founded: 16 October 1803; 222 years ago
- Founder: Lt.-Gov. David Collins, RN
- Abandoned: 20 May 1804
- Settlement period: 217 days

Site notes
- Material: Limestone; timber
- Area: 100 ha (247 acres) (initial site); c. 17 ha (42 acres) (reserve)
- Website: nepeanhistoricalsociety.asn.au

Victorian Heritage Register
- Official name: Collins Settlement Site
- Type: Registered place; Registered archaeological place
- Designated: 17 November 1994
- Reference no.: H1050
- Heritage overlay no.: HO255
- Categories: Cemeteries and Burial Sites; Parks, Gardens and Trees; Landscape - Cultural; Landscape - Natural; Government and Administration

The Collins settlement site, also known as the 1803 Collins settlement site, is a colonial settlement and archaeological site, located on Point Nepean Road, one kilometre (0.6 mi) east of Sorrento, on the Mornington Peninsula, approximately 60 kilometres (37 mi) due south of Melbourne, in its south eastern suburbs, in Victoria, Australia.

Located on the traditional land of the Bunerong Bulak people, the Sullivan Bay site of initially 100 hectares (247 acres) was the first permanent colonial settlement in the area – that pre-dates the settlement of Melbourne – and lasted for a mere 217 days before the site was abandoned.

The settlement site was added to the Victorian Heritage Register on 17 November 1994 in recognition of its historic, archaeological, aesthetic (landscape), and social significance; and was also added to a non-statutory list by the Victorian branch of the National Trust on 30 June 1991, and was submitted for consideration to be added to the Australian National Heritage List on an unknown date, however, subsequently not considered due to timing considerations.

== History ==
=== Indigenous history ===
The site is located on the traditional lands of the Bunerong Bulak people.

The Bunerong Bulak had contact with a party led by Acting Lieutenant John Murray in the HMS Lady Nelson in January 1802 that ended in tragedy after shots were fired on landing around Port Phillip Bay. The site of the extensive stratified midden on the Eastern Sister near a rock shelf with shell and charcoal remains was the site of the settlement. The site symbolised the beginning of an active process of colonisation that displaced the aboriginal peoples of Victoria, and is known as the first encounter of colonial forces and their impact on indigenous cultural traditions. The extensive and well-preserved Aboriginal middens at Sullivan Bay predate the 1803 settlement, and provide evidence of potential scientific importance about pre-colonisation Aboriginal life.

=== Historical context ===
Murray, in the HMS Lady Nelson, identified Port Phillip Bay in January 1802. Before leaving in March 1802 he officially took possession of the area in the name of the King of England with a flag raising ceremony at Point King. Murray was followed by Captain Matthew Flinders in the HMS Investigator (1801) who entered Port Phillip on 26 April 1802, and spent five days exploring the area. However, in March 1802, just before Flinders entered Port Phillip, the French explorer Nicolas Baudin, aboard Le Naturaliste as part of his voyage of scientific discovery, entered Western Port and then traversed the east coast of New Holland, and refitted in Sydney.

Aboard the schooner, HMS Cumberland (1803), Lieutenant Charles Robbins and surveyor Lieutenant Charles Grimes, with others, explored Port Phillip in January 1803. Grimes landed near Portsea and for the next month surveyed the land, travelling round the bay on foot through the coastal area. In his detailed survey of Port Phillip Bay, Grimes recommended a suitable site for a permanent settlement, located adjacent to the Yarra River; and he also explored land adjacent to the Maribyrnong River.

Aware of the presence of the French Navy, Captain Philip Gidley King, the Governor of New South Wales, in his May 1802 report of activities to the War and Colonial Office suggested a settlement be established in Port Phillip or Bass Strait to relieve the pressure on the Sydney settlement with its 6,000 convicts, and as a deterrent to any French occupation. King was also concerned that there was need for the protection from foreigners of the trade in fur skins from the seals in Bass Strait and for the whaling catch. Naturalist Joseph Banks also supported the proposed settlement, as apart from other issues, there was need to find areas that could produce an income to defray the cost of the Sydney settlement. The War and Colonial Office was about to send another consignment of convicts to Sydney in the warship HMS Calcutta (52 guns) and, accepting the suggestion, also commissioned the Ocean (481 tons) as a supply vessel to establish a settlement in Port Phillip or Bass Strait.

=== Settlement party ===
Lieutenant-Colonel David Collins, who was Judge Advocate of Colonial New South Wales, in Sydney for nine years, was appointed in charge as Lieutenant-Governor. The landed party consisted of 299 convicts, fifty marines as guards, twelve civil administrators, 21 settlers, 36 wives and 38 children; in total, a party of 467 people. To establish the settlement, the convicts included sawyers (9), carpenters (4), bricklayers (3), other mechanics (24), shoemakers (12), clothing trades (18), butchers, bakers as well as 157 general labourers.

Collins departed Portsmouth before Grimes' survey had arrived at the War and Colonial Office. Hence, he was unaware of Grimes' recommendation. The site Collins selected for the settlement was on the southern side of Port Phillip Bay at Sullivan Bay, relatively close to the heads, a site chosen to enable protection of Bass Strait from the French. It was a difficult site to settle, without easy access to fresh running water, an anchorage well off-shore, and poor soils for agriculture. Collins' survey of Port Phillip Bay revealed that much of the area had similar characteristics.

The Calcutta arrived in Port Phillip, via the Cape of Good Hope, on 10 October 1803 and the settlement was established on 16 October 1803 on an area of land between the Western Sister and Eastern Sister, prominent headlands which mark each end of Sullivan Bay. Most of the settlement was close to the Eastern Sister. Initially a tent encampment, work commenced quickly on building a jetty and other timber structures, including huts. Local limestone was apparently used to construct chimneys for the huts, and for the building of the gun magazine. As well as barrels set into sand to trap fresh water, wells were dug, as were privies. Land was cleared for the growing of crops, perhaps totalling several acres.

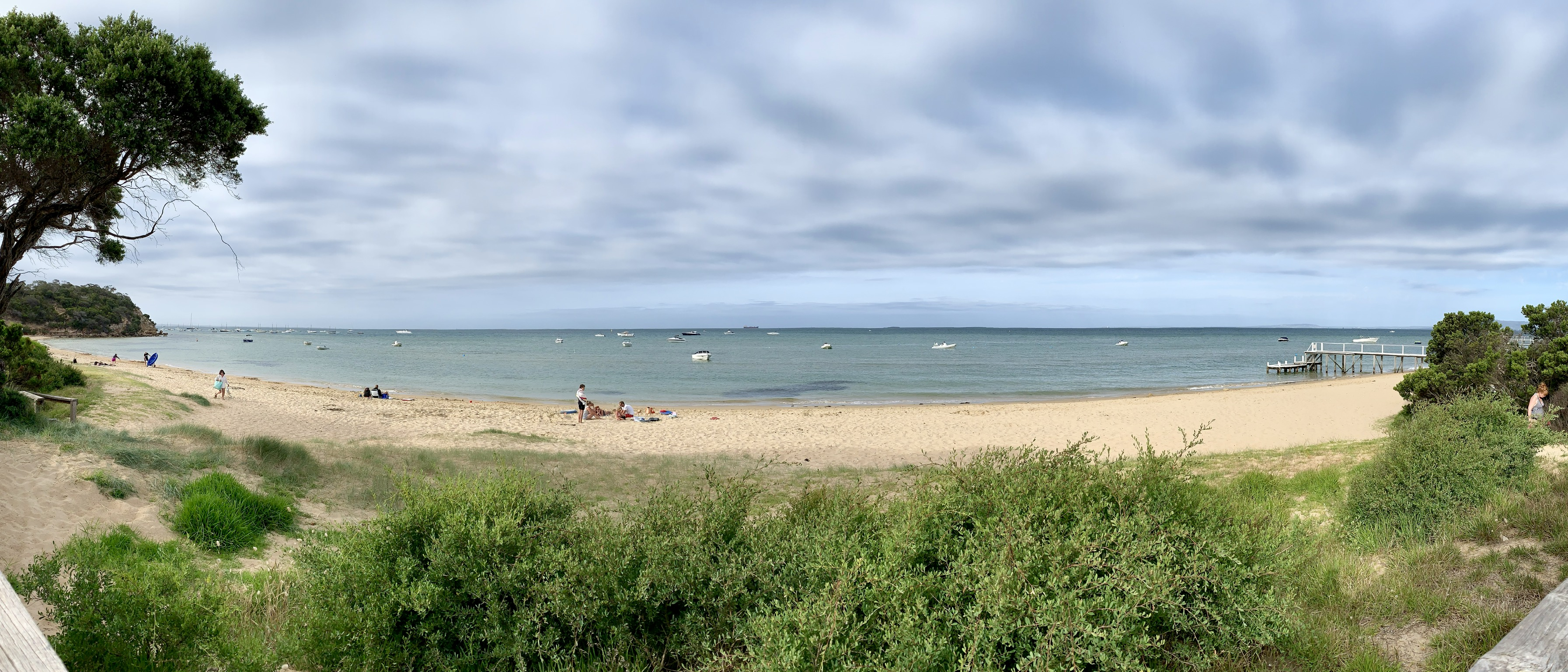
A view from the settlement site, looking into Port Phillip Bay, 2018

After the long sea voyage, Collins quickly established the settlement at Sullivan Bay, that he named after John Sullivan, the inaugural Under-Secretary of State for War and the Colonies. In choosing this place for a settlement, Collins and party directly displaced Aboriginal people from a regular camping area. The location was, however, unfortunate as it had no fresh water stream, poor agricultural soil, shallow sea approach, and no large trees for timber, although it was close to the "heads" of Port Phillip and close to the ocean frontage for an observation post.

Collins arranged for Lieutenant James Tuckey of the Calcutta to explore Port Phillip for a more suitable site. Tuckey had a skirmish with 200 Aborigines at Corio Bay – believed to be the site of the first European murder of Aborigines in Victoria. During a storm, Tuckey missed the entrance to the Yarra River and the site of the future Melbourne. Tuckey reported that the land was poor and there was little fresh water in Port Phillip and, later, Western Port, and that suitable timber could not be found. The treacherous entrance to the bay made the site unsuitable for whaling and with few marines, the settlement was vulnerable to attack.

In November 1803, Collins reported to Governor King that these areas were "full of natives" and that he would "require four times the strength" of his current armed forces to displace them. Collins requested King's permission to relocate the settlement elsewhere. King agreed, and sent Grimes' earlier plan of Port Phillip, dated February 1803, not previously available to Collins, showing the Yarra River as the recommended site. However, Collins was by now uncertain of his troops and of the attitude of the Aborigines.

Collins wrote to Governor King:

"The sooner we are enabled to leave this unpromising and unproductive country, the sooner shall we be able to reap the advantages of a more fertile spot."

— Lt.-Gov. David Collins, November 1803.

In 1804 Collins decided to move the settlement to Van Diemen's Land, where John Bowen had established a settlement at Risdon Cove in 1803. They were moved as two parties, the first in January 1804, via the Ocean and HMS Lady Nelson, and the second group leaving on 20 May 1804, just over seven months after the settlement had been established. On arrival in Risdon Cove, Collins found the area unsuitable and then moved further south, naming the settlement Hobart Town, in honour of Lord Hobart, the inaugural Secretary of State for War and the Colonies.

==== Timeline of the settlement ====
Landing started on 16 October 1803. Barrels were buried into the sand above high water mark and readily filled with potable water that was allocated on a daily basis. The first printed Garrison Orders were issued on 16 October with a further 45 by 27 January 1804. A census of livestock was made on 27 October that included two bulls, one cow, two heifers, twelve sheep, pigs, goats and poultry. A store operated by John Blinkworth opened on 29 October. The Reverend Robert Knopwood was appointed magistrate and held his first sitting on 2 November. The first mail was dispatched to Sydney on 6 November, with Collins report to Governor King and for others to send to England.

William James Hobart Thorn was born on 25 November and baptised by Rev. Knopwood. This was followed by the marriage on 28 November of Hannah Harvey and Richard Garrett solemnised by Rev. Knopwood. Approximately thirty people died and 19 burials were recorded during the seven-month period of settlement. Areas were allocated to the free settlers who prepared gardens and built huts. Limestone was soon found and used for the chimney places. The convicts sunk a number of wells, built a store, a limestone magazine, and a 120-metre (380 ft) jetty. During the brief occupation, 21 convicts escaped, including William Buckley.

== Description ==
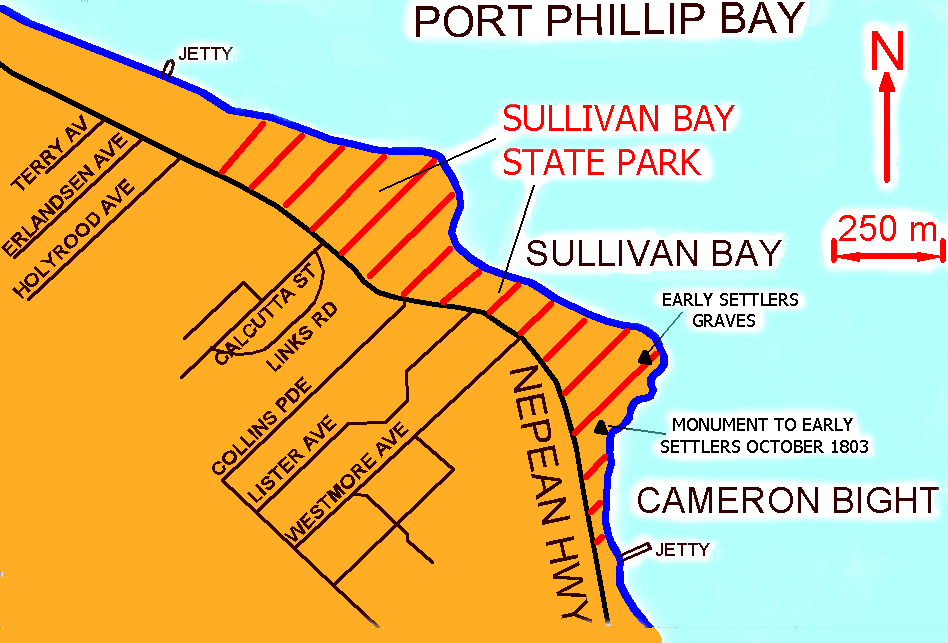
Handrawn map of the location surrounding Sullivan Bay

The seafront site comprises a mix of private and public land of approximately 17 hectares (42 acres) on the western tip of the Mornington Peninsula, bounded in the south west by the northern road reserve boundary of Point Nepean Road, in the north west by the north easterly alignment of the north west boundary of Lot 2 PS319538, in the north east by the shoreline of Port Phillip Bay, and the north easterly alignment of the centre line of Hughes Road in the south east. The foreshore reserves protect the natural vegetation much as when the settlement was established in 1803.

The well-organised settlement site under the administration under Lt-Governor Collins included a chaplain, three surgeons, surveyor, mineralogist, superintendents and overseers. The convict workforce had a reasonable range of trades to establish a settlement and at least fourteen of the free settlers established themselves elsewhere as successful farmers or artisans. The site demonstrates a high degree of technical achievement at a particular period as noted by the layout of the settlement and the exploration parties under Lt. Tuckey around Port Phillip and across the Nepean Peninsula to Western Port to check on a more suitable site. The convicts cut trees at Arthurs Seat thought to be suitable for masts and 46 were loaded on the HMS Calcutta to take back to England. A hospital was established; and two guns were thought to be located on the Western Sister (Battery Point) and a lookout post (St Paul's) established on the ocean frontage with a signal system to the settlement.

There is limited remaining physical evidence of the Collins settlement; other than oak barrels recovered in 1926, and artefacts thought to date to the initial settlement of the area such as the remains of a hand-blown brandy bottle inscribed "Old Cognac 1795", and a pair of leg irons. It is one of the few Australian 'founding' sites where much of the original natural landscape has survived.

Whilst graves were discovered in the 1870s and placed in a reserve in 1875, it is unclear that these were the graves of the nineteen original settlers who were recorded as buried between October 1803 and May 1804. Nevertheless, the graves site within the reserve is important for symbolic reasons in long being recognised by both the government and the community as a symbol and icon of the first attempt of European settlement in Victoria, even though historical knowledge suggests they are unlikely to be associated with the settlement.

The site represents special association with the life of a number of persons of importance to Colonial Australia's cultural history, including Collins; William Buckley, an escaped convict who lived with the Wathaurung for 32 years; John Pascoe Fawkner, who was an important figure in the establishment of Melbourne; and Edward Lord, a marine and later Colonial administrator and settler in Hobart Town.

=== Heritage context ===
The site is similar, in historical context, to both Botany Bay and The Rocks in Sydney, and Risdon Cove in Tasmania, as one of the few surviving Australian 'founding' sites. From the perspectives of global colonisation, the site contains historical fabric, associations and meanings that are vital to the understanding of the history of colonisation in southern Australia. The site symbolises the beginning of an active process of colonisation which displaced the indigenous population of Victoria, changing their culture and the environment irrevocably.

The aesthetic significance of the site is due to the survival of much of the pre-settlement landscape of Sullivan Bay, including the enclosing headlands, the old-growth Moonah woodland, the shallow waters of the bay, the views between the Eastern and Western Sister and the Western Sister and St Paul's, and to Arthurs Seat. The social significance of the site has long being recognised as the site of the 1803 settlement. The Melbourne and Peninsula communities have strongly defended the site during times when its long term protection seemed in jeopardy. The private properties also include much of the natural vegetation and many of the houses are largely hidden by the vegetation. The view from the Eastern Sister of the historic reserve provides a magnificent vista of Port Phillip with the foreground seascape of moored boats outside the Sorrento Sailing Club and around to those near Cameron's Bight Jetty and the Blairgowrie Yacht Squadron. The distant views include the hills of Arthurs Seat, Mount Martha and Mount Eliza, with the tall buildings of Melbourne visible on a clear day.

=== Legacy ===
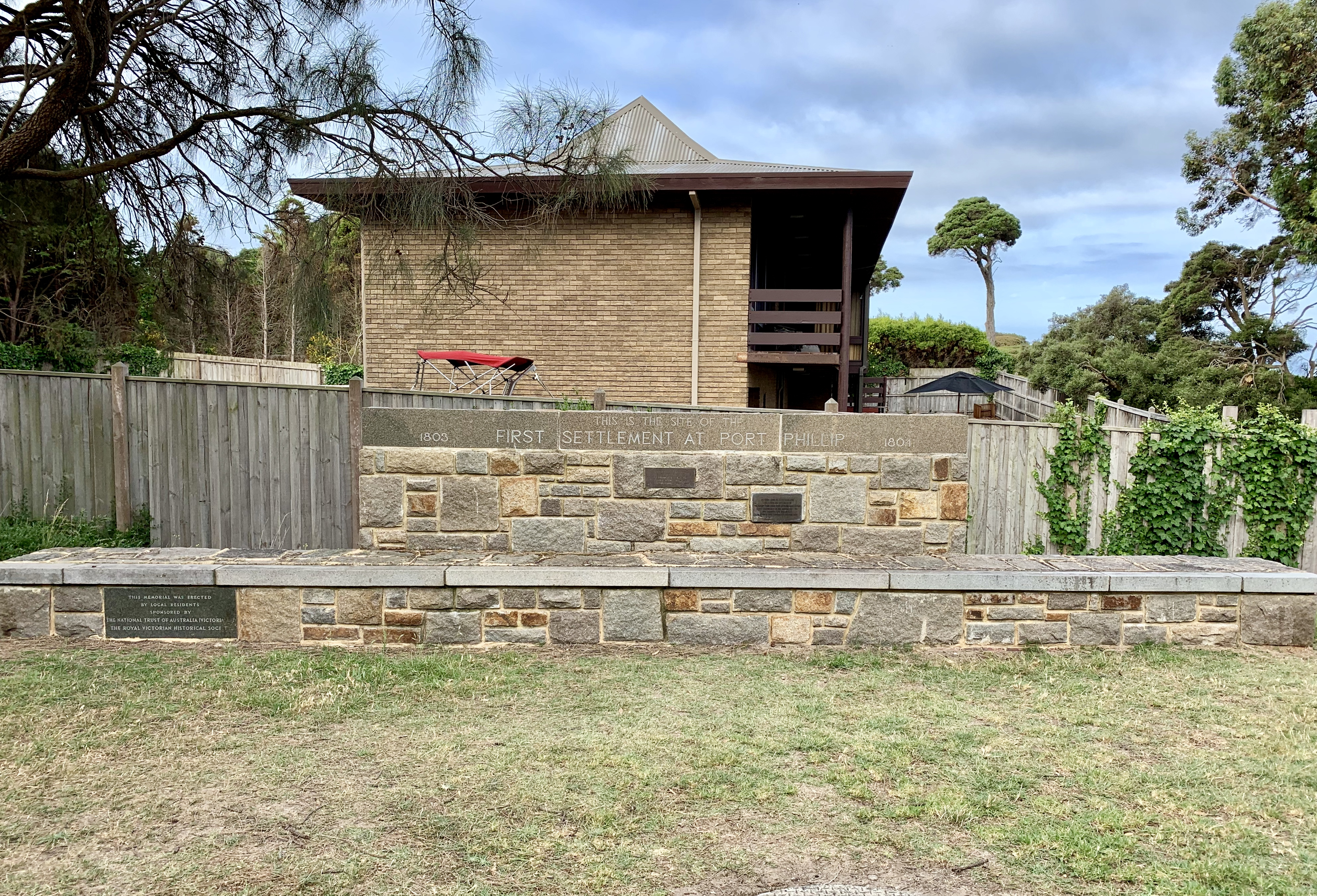
The visitors' centre and memorials, in 2018

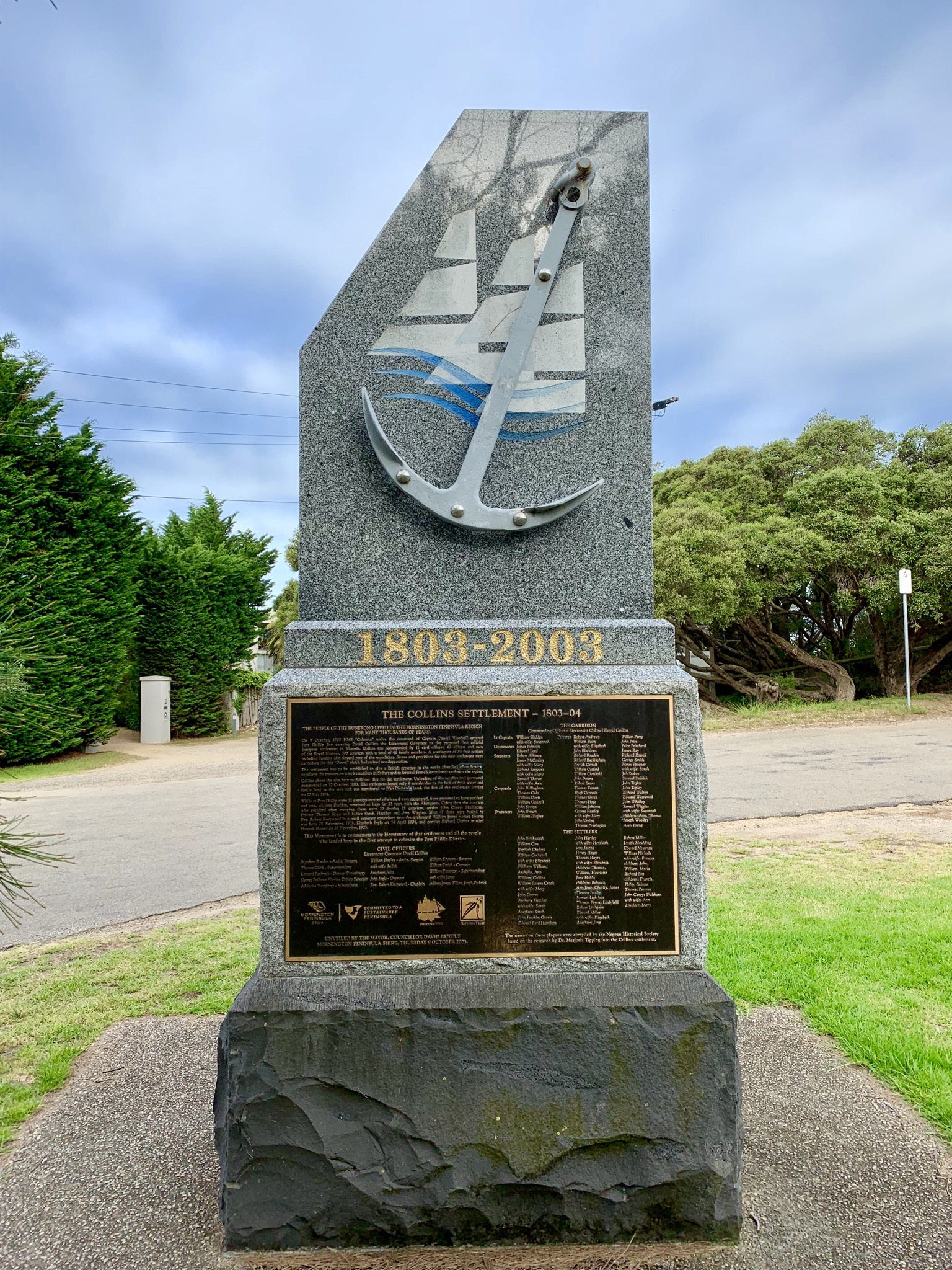
The 200th anniversary memorial, in 2018

The principal street of the Melbourne central business district is named Collins Street, in honour of Lt-Governor Collins. A suburb is named Fawkner, in honour of John Pascoe Fawkner. Streets close to the settlement site have the names Collins, Calcutta, Ocean, William Buckley, Lady Nelson, and Tuckey. "Buckley's chance" is an Australian phrase that echoes the experiences of William Buckley.

A public subscription raised money to fence the graves site in c. 1908, that was created a reserve in 1875. In 1965 the Royal Historical Society of Victoria, the National Trust of Australia (Victoria) and the Flinders Shire erected a monument in Leggatt Way. On 14 October 1978, in celebration of the site's 175th anniversary, the Hobart Town (1804) First Settlers Association gifted a commemorative monument, in honour of their ancestors who initially settled at the Sullivans Bay site, prior to settling in Hobart.

In 1982, with the support of the Victorian government, an adjacent private site at the Eastern Sister was acquired and it became the Collins Settlement Historic Reserve. A structure on this site was used as a discovery centre, operated by the "Friends of Collins 1803 Settlement". Situated on the edge of a cliff, the discovery centre was considered unsafe and demolished in 2003. A new pavilion was erected by Parks Victoria in Leggatt Way, at the entrance to the reserve, that opened in September 2008, managed by the Nepean Historical Society.

For the 200th Anniversary of the Collins Settlement in 2003, a committee was formed to commemorate the event. A floodlit second monument was dedicated on 9 October 2003 at the entrance to Leggatt Way, that listed all 458 people who formed the first settlement. Signage leads the walk from Leggett Way to the Eastern Sister lookout that some 30,000 visitors each year use to the historic reserve.

The foreshore reserves are maintained by the Shire of Mornington Peninsula and Parks Victoria with the help of the Friends of Collins 1803 Settlement. Overall, the appearance from the sea is much as seen by the original settlers with its beaches and vegetated cliffs.

== See also ==
- British colonisation of Australia
- Geography of Port Phillip
- History of Victoria
- List of places on the Victorian Heritage Register in the Shire of Mornington Peninsula
