= Port Phillip Bay Bridge proposals =

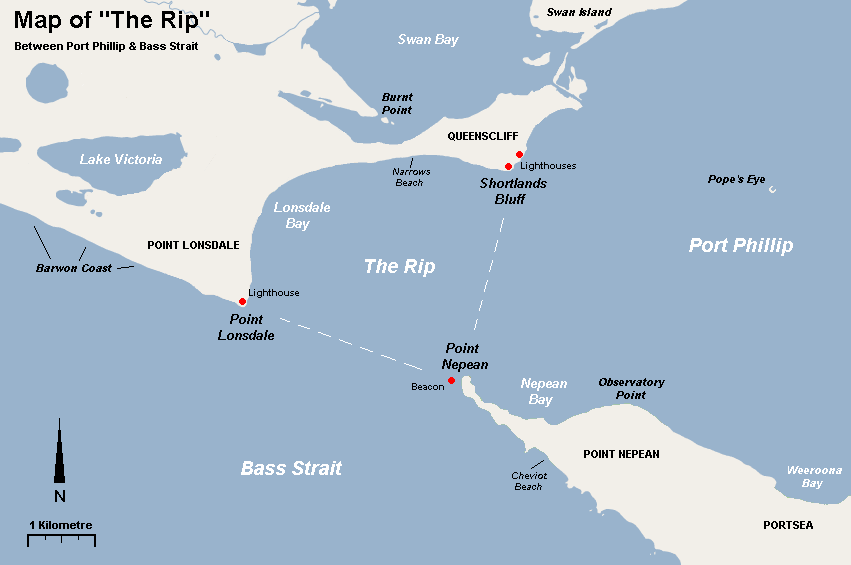

The Port Phillip Bay Bridge proposals have been suggested as a means of linking Queenscliff and Sorrento via a bridge and therefore eliminating the need of a ferry as the only way of transport across the waterway.

Such a bridge would need to span a 3.1-kilometre (1.9 mi) stretch of water known as "The Rip" between Queenscliff and Portsea, Victoria in order to connect the Bellarine Highway and the Mornington Peninsula Freeway. If it were built as a suspension bridge, this would probably give the proposed bridge the longest central span of any suspension bridge in the world.

In a preliminary proposal put forward by David Broadbent in March 1998, 10 possible routes were evaluated. Only one of these routes was considered to be viable. Based on this preferred crossing, the bridge would have a landfall to landfall distance of 5.7 km (3.5 mi), with a main span of 2.5 km (1.5 mi). The air draft of the bridge was calculated at 70 metres.

In March 2023 the Mayor of Mornington Peninsula Steve Holland supported an idea for the bridge.

== See also ==
- Division of Corangamite (federal seat) in the West
- Electoral district of Bellarine (State seat) in the West
- Division of Flinders (State seat) in the East
- Electoral district of Nepean (State seat) in the East
