= Sorrento Post Office =

- Location within Victoria
- 38.3387°S 144.7409°E
- Location: 10–16 Ocean Beach Road, Sorrento, Victoria, Australia

History
- Built: 1904–05

Site notes
- Architect: Public Works Department under John Hudson Marsden

Commonwealth Heritage List
- Official name: Sorrento Post Office
- Type: Listed place (Historic)
- Designated: 22 June 2004
- Reference no.: 105632

Sorrento Post Office is a heritage-listed post office at 10–16 Ocean Beach Road, Sorrento, Victoria, Australia. It was added to the Australian Commonwealth Heritage List on 22 June 2004.

== History ==
The Sorrento post office and quarters were constructed in 1904–05, on the site of a former post office, by Sorrento builder Charles Haslett. The post office was the second post office, after Terang, to be constructed for the Commonwealth by the Victorian government. While Terang and Sorrento post offices, along with that at Woodend, have been thought by some to have been the first Commonwealth designed and built post offices in Victoria, original plans in the National Archives of Australia suggest that Terang and Sorrento, and following from that Woodend, were constructed by the Victorian Public Works Department under its architect, John Hudson Marsden. An initial five post offices were built by the State between 1903 and 1907, at Terang, Sorrento, Woodend, Korumburra and Leongatha. Sorrento remains the oldest Commonwealth-era post office in Victoria still under Commonwealth ownership.

Alterations c. 1920s–1940s included rear additions; construction of additional rooms to west, incorporating new entry; removal of verandah return to this elevation; alterations to facade including bricking in of original entry and adjoining window; internal reconfigurations, expansion and formation of new mail room, introduction of post office boxes to facade and east elevations. It underwent general refurbishment in the 1960s and 1980s, with the roofing also replaced.

== Description ==
Sorrento Post Office is at 10–16 Ocean Beach Road, Sorrento.

The Sorrento post office is a one-storey building in the Federation style and includes a postmasters quarters attached at the rear. The walls are of red brick, with smooth rendered and over-painted upper sections. The roof is of corrugated iron, which extends into a verandah over the footpath which is supported on heavy timber stop-chamfered posts accentuated by decorative brackets, with simple frieze work above. The face of the gable above the verandah is stuccoed, containing the words "Post and Telegraph Office" in a late nineteenth century Arts and Crafts calligraphy. The post office is set within the context of a number of historic buildings in the Ocean Beach Road streetscape, Sorrento's main shopping precinct.

The front facade of the building has been substantially altered, including the infill of original openings, including the original entrance door to the east and adjoining window and an extension/infill to the west side, incorporating the present entry which has resulted in the loss of the original return verandah form, and the introduction of a modern entry and private post office boxes. The windows are generally timber frame double hung sash forms, with three-paned glazed highlight windows above. Many retain their original "ripple" glazing. The windows have rendered over-painted sloping sills below except for those to the west extension which have sloping brick sills. There are two tripartite timber framed window forms – one to both the facade and one to the east elevation. This last has been substantially modified with one third of the sill cut out and the wall below cut down to form a new door opening within the window form to provide access to the mail room extension. The windows have segmental brick arched heads.

The former residential component in timber has been heavily altered, and the original rear section has been concealed by a weatherboard extension, running east to west across the building.

Internally the post shop space is approached by a small vestibule formed as part of the subsequent west extension; the space is carpeted and has a suspended grid-form acoustic tile ceiling. A timber framed and glazed door in the east wall leads into the post shop proper. The post shop has been upgraded with a standard Australia Post retail fitout installed and grey colour scheme. The floor is carpeted, the walls are hard plastered and the original timber lined ceiling, divided into coffered bays by timber battens and retaining its decorative circular perforated metal vents, has been retained. Lighting is in the form of fluorescent fittings mounted in rows to a metal batten affixed directly to the ceiling. The back of house spaces retain much of their original fabric detailing including four-panelled doors – over-painted – with transoms above, original plaster finishes and picture rails, skirtings, ceiling forms and fireplaces and fire surrounds to the main rooms. An internal north–south hallway has been incorporated into the back-of-house spaces at an unknown date.

Despite various alterations and extensions, the internal planning of the post office and quarters remains reasonably evident.

The building is in average to good condition. General cracking associated with structural alterations including the removal of internal walls.

The property displays a fair level of intactness. (2008)

== Heritage listing ==
Sorrento Post Office, constructed in 1904–05, has been an integral element of the town's commercial district. Designed and constructed by the Victorian government for the newly formed Commonwealth Postmaster-General's Department, it is a strong example of the post office as the realisation, and one of the few prominent early symbols, of Federation and the Commonwealth government in the local context. The Sorrento building was the second of five early post office buildings, after Terang constructed by the Victorian Public Works Department for the Commonwealth Government in the 1903–1907 period. Sorrento is believed to be one of the oldest Commonwealth-period post office in Victoria remaining under Commonwealth ownership, the oldest probably being the Stanthorpe Post Office in Queensland, which was constructed in 1901.

The curtilage includes the title block/allotment of the property.

The significant components of Sorrento Post Office include the main postal building of 1904–5. The weatherboard additions to the rear dating from the interwar period are of contributory significance.
