= Mechanics' Institute, Sorrento =

Coordinates: 38.3410652°S 144.7344555°E

The Mechanics' Institute, Sorrento is a building classified by the National Trust of Australia and located at 827 Melbourne Road, Sorrento, Victoria, Australia.

Mechanics' Institute, Sorrento.

In July 1876, the Mechanics' Institutes Trust received the land, believed to be a donation from local landowner, parliamentarian and 8th Premier of Victoria, Sir Charles Gavan Duffy. The Trust built the first hall using local limestone and the building was opened on 3 February 1877. Performers at the opening ceremony concert included local landowner, comedian and parliamentarian, the Honourable George Coppin and his daughter, Blanche.

By 1910, the institute's library contained 2015 books and various magazines. The hall was used for concerts, dances, lectures, church socials, political meetings and other functions. It also housed the Court of Petty Sessions. During World War I and World War II, the hall was used by the Red Cross for making items and packing parcels for Australian troops.

On 24 January 1885, a special concert was held at the Institute featuring Dame Nellie Melba.

== Sorrento Museum ==
In 1965 the Flinders Shire Council, an early predecessor to the Shire of Mornington Peninsula, made the Mechanics' Institute available to the Nepean Historical Society. On 15 October 1967, the Historical Society opened the Sorrento Museum in the building. In March 1994, a gallery extension was built using grants from the Commonwealth Government and the local Shire.

The Nepean Historical Society is a non-profit organisation accredited under the Museum Australia Accreditation Program.

Sorrento Museum features several rooms of display tracing the history of the area, including original items from the Collins Settlement in 1803, which was the first European settlement in Victoria, as well as shipwreck artefacts, Boon Wurrung stone tools, and memorabilia from early tourism in the area. An original settlers cottage is also onsite.
