= Daveys Bay =

Bay in Victoria, Australia

- Daveys Bay jetty with Olivers Hill and Frankston in the background

- Location of the bay in Greater Metropolitan Melbourne
- Interactive map of Daveys Bay
- Location: Victoria
- Coordinates: 38°09′53″S 145°05′41″E
- Primary outflows: Port Phillip
- Basin countries: Australia
- Frozen: never
- Settlements: Mount Eliza

Daveys Bay is a small shallow bay of Port Phillip, located scout-east of Melbourne, in Victoria, Australia. It is one of several small bays adjoining the town of Mount Eliza and is the closest region of the Shire of Mornington Peninsula to Melbourne.

Daveys Bay is named after James Davey who built a jetty at the western end of the bay in the 1840s. Davey used the jetty to load his ketch with produce destined for the Melbourne markets. Davey's Bay Yacht Club, founded in 1909, is located at the jetty.

The north-eastern shoreline of Daveys Bay features an exposure of the Manyung Fault, part of the main Selwyn Fault system.
