= Continental Hotel, Sorrento =

Heritage-listed hotel in Melbourne, Victoria, Australia

Continental Hotel
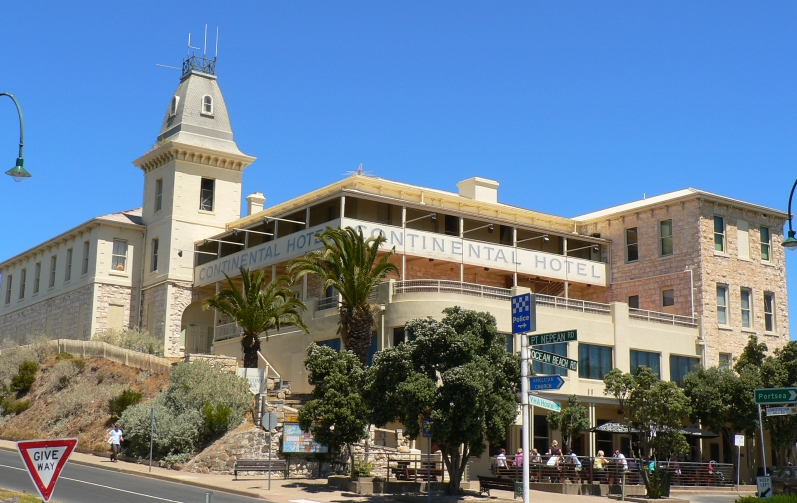
- The hotel in 2006, prior to its renovation

- Location of the hotel in Greater Metropolitan Melbourne
- Interactive map of the Continental Hotel area
- Former names: Hotel Continental (c. 1940s – c. 2010s)
- Alternative names: "the Conti" (locally); InterContinental Sorrento Mornington Peninsula

General information
- Status: Completed
- Type: Hotel (five-star)
- Architectural style: Victorian Italianate (1875); Streamline Moderne (1940s)
- Location: 1–21 Ocean Beach Road, Sorrento, Mornington Peninsula, Melbourne, Victoria, Australia
- Coordinates: 38°20′21″S 144°44′29″E
- Current tenants: Aurora Spa and Bathhouse (part)
- Year built: 1875–1876
- Completed: 1875; 151 years ago
- Inaugurated: 21 January 1876
- Renovated: 2022
- Renovation cost: A$120 million
- Client: George Coppin
- Owner: Victor Smorgon, Kanat, and Trenerry Property groups (since 2020)
- Operator: IHG Hotels & Resorts as the InterContinental (since 2022)

Technical details
- Material: Limestone; corrugated iron; glass
- Size: 108 rooms and suites
- Floor count: 4

Renovating team
- Renovating firm: Woods Bagot (with Bryce Raworth [heritage])
- Engineer: Norman Disney & Young
- Other designers: Alessi Design Group
- Main contractor: Hamilton Marino

Website
- thecontinentalsorrento.com.au

Victorian Heritage Register
- Type: Registered place
- Designated: 12 October 2000
- Reference no.: H1896
- Heritage overlay no.: HO257
- Category: Commercial

Register of the National Estate
- Official name: Continental Hotel
- Type: Defunct register
- Designated: undated
- Reference no.: 103095

The Continental Hotel, known locally as "the Conti", is a five-star hotel, managed as the InterContinental Sorrento, located at 1–21 Ocean Beach Road in Sorrento, on the Mornington Peninsula, in the south eastern suburbs of Melbourne, in Victoria, Australia.

Built in 1875, the hotel was added to the Victorian Heritage Register on 12 October 2000 in recognition of its historical and architectural significance; and was also added the now defunct Register of the National Estate on an unknown date.

== History ==
The Continental Hotel was established in 1875 by the Sorrento Hotel Company (Note: Also described as the "Continental Hotel Company".) under the directorship of George Coppin, a comedian, politician, philanthropist and businessman. Coppin was responsible for a large proportion of the tourist development on the Mornington Peninsula in the last decades of the nineteenth century; including establishing the steamer service from Melbourne and the tram service from the pier to the hotel. The popular hotel development was established in the later years of the nineteenth century to provide accommodation, entertainment and associated hotel services for wealthy city tourists. In its heyday, the Continental Hotel promoted a European atmosphere together with fishing, shooting, bowls, tennis, orchestra in season, plus a magnificent ballroom, and hosted a performance by Dame Nellie Melba.

Between 1882 and 1887, the licensee of the hotel was William Hughes, a former limeburner who lived at 89 Hotham Road, and later opened the Oriental Coffee Palace. In 1885 Isaac Edward Bensilum appeared in the rate books as the owner of the hotel. Bensilum was also a very active developer in the town and built the Athenaeum Theatre in 1894. Managed jointly with his wife, Nellie, during their ownership, the hotel was advertised from c. 1899 that it was "…the only Hotel in the Colonies to have refrigerated ice."

There were various changes to the occupancy of parts of the building complex over the next decades until it was purchased by Thomas E. Hawkins. Other owners included L. Fitzgerald, L. Devine, and, N. and G. Fernhead. From the 1980s, the hotel operated as a nightclub. Attempts to redevelop the landmark form the 2010s all failed, and in 2020, receivers were appointed to sell the hotel. Purchased by the Victor Smorgon, Kanat, and Trenerry Property groups, they completed a A$120 million redevelopment, designed by Woods Bagot architects, and the hotel reopened as the InterContinental Sorrento Mornington Peninsula, part of the IHG Hotels & Resorts group. In late 2025, it was reported that the owners will list the hotel for sale in 2026, with expectations of more than A$150 million.

== Description ==
The four-storey Continental Hotel is constructed in a simple Victorian Italianate style using locally quarried limestone. The building which includes the mansard-roofed tower, return balcony on the upper levels and two-storey section to the rear of the building. The building has undergone some major changes, with a Streamline Moderne style renovation to the street front of the ground and first floors which includes a roof top deck.

A striking landmark building, the hotel is situated on the cliff-top at the end of Ocean Beach Road, and is slightly set back from the street. At the southern side of the hotel, a four-storey wing without verandah, projects towards the street and is attached to a single storey section, initially a separate general store that was built prior to 1900. The large site included extensive corrugated iron sheds in the corner which may once have housed stables or garages. The hotel is a rare four-storey limestone building in Australia.

== See also ==
- Architecture of Melbourne
- List of hotels in Melbourne
- List of places on the Victorian Heritage Register in the Shire of Mornington Peninsula
