= Sorrento, Victoria =

Sorrento
- Suburb
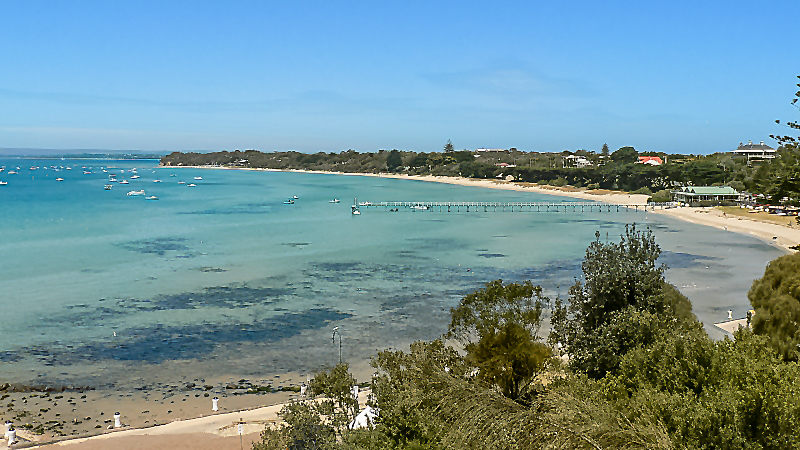
- Sorrento Beach

- Interactive map of Sorrento
- Coordinates: 38°20′20″S 144°44′27″E
- Country: Australia
- State: Victoria
- City: Melbourne
- LGA: Shire of Mornington Peninsula
- Location: 103 km (64 mi) from Melbourne
- Established: 1830s

Government
  - State electorate: Nepean
  - Federal division: Flinders

Area
  - Total: 7 km^{2} (2.7 sq mi)

Population
  - Total: 2,013 (2021 census)
  - Density: 288/km^{2} (740/sq mi)
- Postcode: 3943
Suburbs around Sorrento
Portsea		Port Phillip
	Sorrento
Bass Strait		Blairgowrie

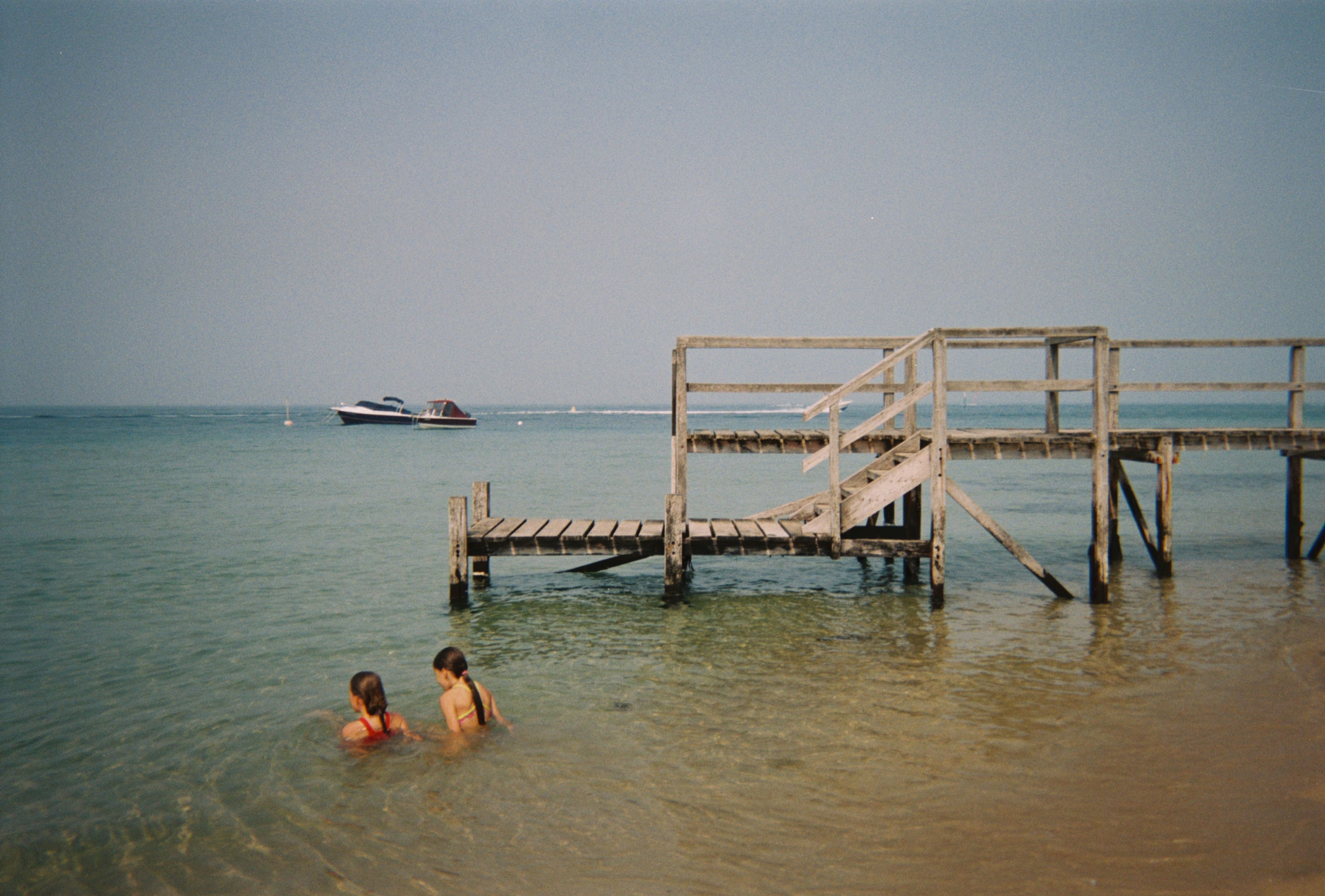
Point King beach in Sorrento

Sorrento is a town on the Mornington Peninsula, Victoria, Australia, located within the Shire of Mornington Peninsula local government area. It is 103 km (64 mi) south-west of Melbourne's central business district. Sorrento recorded a population of 2,013 at the 2021 census. Sorrento is known for its appealing weather, limestone buildings, and its world-class day-spas, which take advantage of the local water pressure to provide an unparalleled scrub.

It is thought that the name "Sorrento" (after the Italian seaside town) was conferred upon what was known as Sullivans Bay when the area was first opened for housing development in 1869.

== History ==
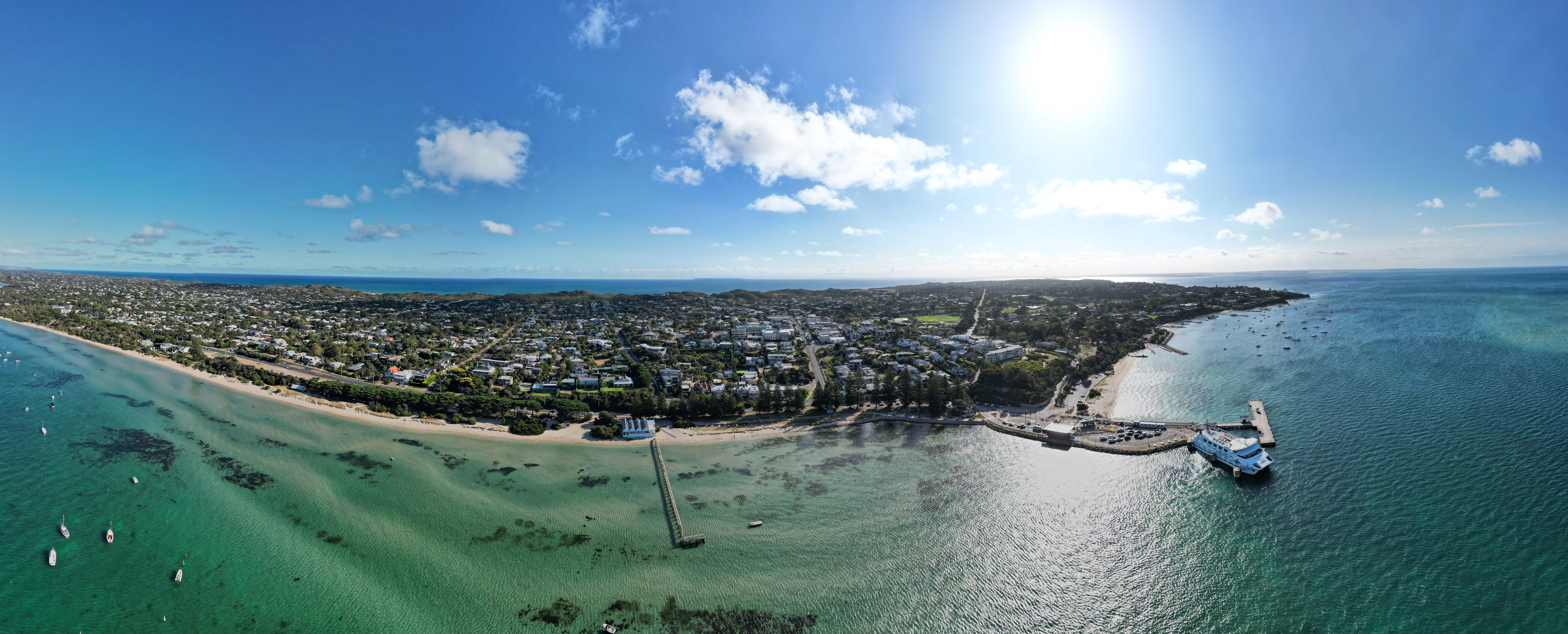
Aerial panorama, 2023

Sorrento is located on the traditional lands of the Boonwurrung people, known to the Boonwurrung as Bullanatoolong.

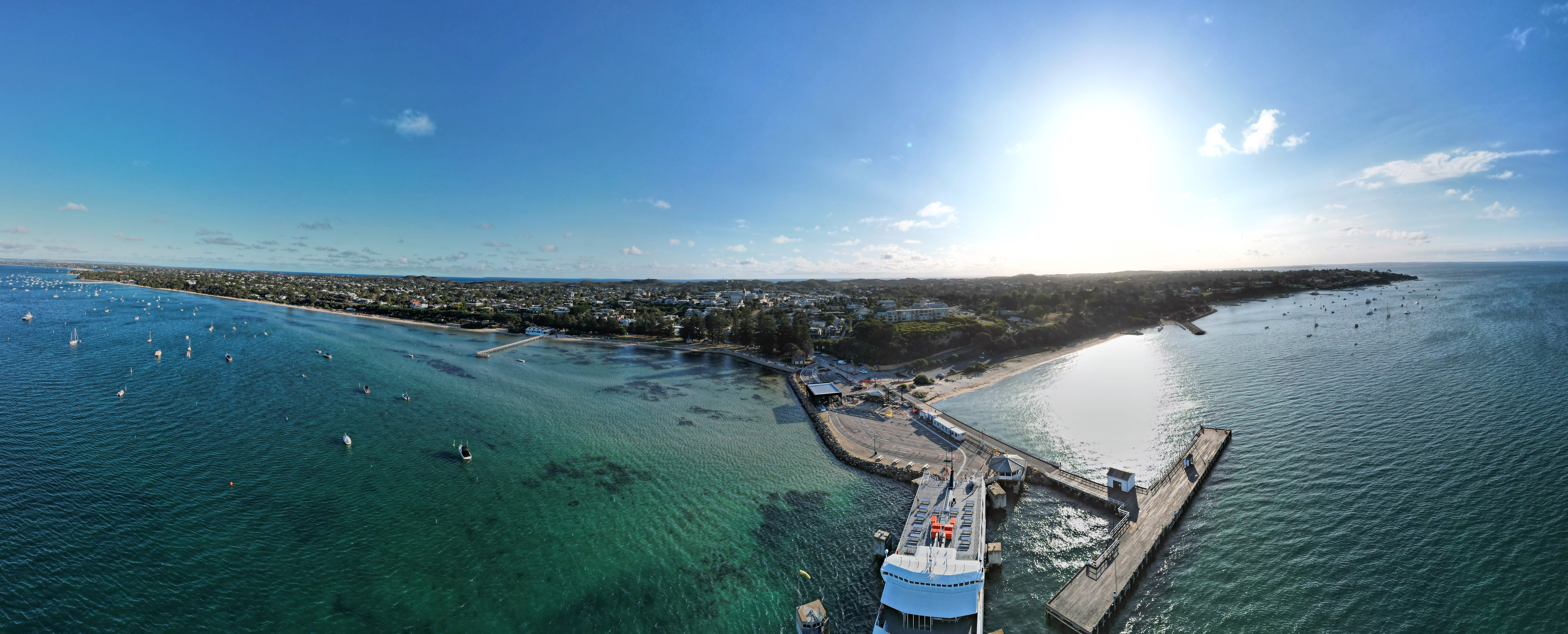
Aerial panorama of Sorrento with the SeaRoad ferry and Sorrento Pier, 2023

In February 1802, Lieutenant John Murray of HMS Lady Nelson led the first British force to enter Port Phillip Bay. Murray chose to anchor Lady Nelson off what is now known as Sorrento Beach. On 17 February the crew landed ashore and were greeted by approximately eighteen local Boonwurrung. The crew, with their dinners in hand, showed how they ate bread. While one of the crew was handing out bread to everyone, they were ambushed. In response, several Boonwurrung were shot at by musket fire, and three received likely mortal wounds. Murray then ordered grapeshot and round shot to be fired from the carronades aboard the ship at the fleeing men. This occurred at a place Murray named Bowen's Point which is now referred to as the Western Sister headland on the Sorrento foreshore. After exploring the southern part of the bay, Murray formally took possession of the area on 8 March 1802 for King George III of Great Britain in a small ceremony at a place now known as the Point King Foreshore Reserve in Sorrento. A few days later Murray sailed out of the heads and returned to Sydney.

=== Collins settlement site ===
In 1803, the British returned and established a convict settlement under the command of Lieutenant Governor David Collins at the Eastern Sister headland of Sullivan Bay in Sorrento. The site became the first British settlement on mainland Australia outside of the Sydney region. Within a few months, the settlement of around 500 people was abandoned and subsequently moved to Hobart town, in the Van Diemen's Land. William Buckley, an infamous convict, escaped from the Collins settlement and went on to live with Aboriginal people in the Geelong area for over thirty years.

The Collins settlement saw Victoria's first magistrates' court, public hospital, postal service, and government printing office to be established in the region. The first wedding, christening, and funeral services in Victoria were also held at the Sullivan Bay site.

=== Town establishment ===
The Sorrento Post Office opened on 10 January 1871; the building dates from 1904 to 1905; and it was subsequently used for retail and as a cafe.

From the 1870s, actor and entrepreneur George Coppin, who had a holiday home in Sorrento, invested heavily in making it a popular destination, through both transportation and accommodation. In 1874 he founded the Sorrento-Queenscliff Steam Navigation Company, which operated the paddle steamer Golden Crown between Port Melbourne, Sorrento and Queenscliff, and made the town much more accessible, and he built the Continental Hotel in 1875 on what was then called Ocean Amphitheatre Road (now Ocean Beach Road). Then in 1889 he founded a company that built a steam powered tram that ran between the ferry terminal and the back beach, where he built a large hotel, the Back Beach Palace, in 1890 (demolished 1965). The tram operated in the summer months, and out of peak periods became a horse tram, the line closed in 1921. Through his efforts the town became a popular destination, with more hotels and holiday homes, sometimes quite grand, built into the early 20th century, as well as shops lining Ocean Beach Road.

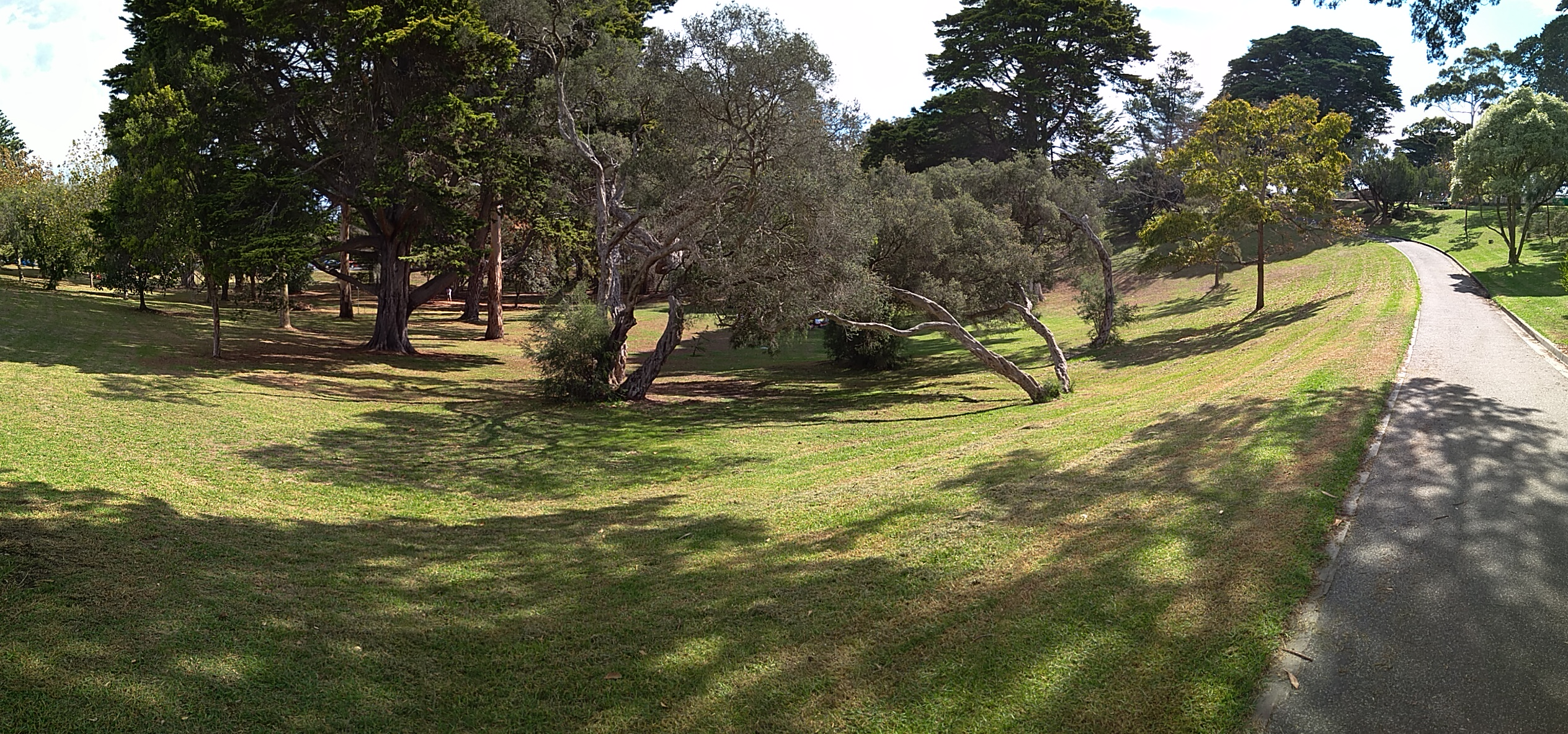
Trees in Sorrento Park

The town has a number of grand historic homes and hotels which date back to the 1860s, almost all of which have been constructed with local limestone. The Australia ICOMOS charter for the conservation of places of cultural significance in the practice of local heritage protection has listed 30 properties. The Sorrento Park, established in 1870, contains a variety of trees, including an Aleppo pine grown from a seed of the Lone Pine of Gallipoli. Situated above the beach and overlooking the bay, Sorrento Park has a children's playground, BBQ facilities, and public toilets.

The town is a popular destination, with regular ferry services to Portsea and Queenscliff.

=== Heritage listings ===
The following places in Sorento are listed on the Victorian Heritage Register:

- The Anchorage, 3273 Point Nepean Road
- Athenaeum Theatre, 26 Ocean Beach Road
- Collins settlement site, 2700–3148 Nepean Point Road
- Continental Hotel, 1–21 Ocean Beach Road

Other structures of local significance, not listed on the Victorian Heritage Register, include:

- Anglican Church (1875 nave, 1889 transept)
- Koonya Hotel and Morgans (both on the foreshore, currently known as Italico restaurant), built by the Skelton/Clark family (1876)
- Mechanics' Institute, built in 1877 using local limestone and the building, houses the Nepean Historical Society's museum
- Ophir House, opposite the Masonic Lodge on Cooper Street was a smaller version of Whitehall (demolished)
- Presbyterian Church, built around 1880
- Sorrento Hotel (1872)
- Whitehall Guest House (1904, on the bank beach)

== Population ==
In the 2016 census, there were 1,592 people in Sorrento. 78.0% of people were born in Australia and 86.8% of people spoke only English at home. The most common responses for religion were No Religion 29.0%, Catholic 24.7% and Anglican 19.3%.

== Tourist attractions ==
Charter fishing boats operate from Sorrento Pier. A regular ferry service links Sorrento with Queenscliff 7 days a week, 365 days a year. Restaurants and shops line the main street, Ocean Beach road.

== Sport ==
The town has an Australian Rules football team, The Sorrento Sharks, competing in the Mornington Peninsula Nepean Football League before winning flags in the PFA in 1929 and 1933, then the MPFL in 1935, 1953, 1964, 1969, 1979, 1980 then the MPNFL in 2004, 2008, 2010, 2011 (seniors and reserves) and 2012.

The Sorrento Cricket Club competes in the Provincial Division of the Mornington Peninsula Cricket Association. Its first and only Provincial First XI premiership was 1971/72. Forty years on, the seniors had their next opportunity in a Provincial Grand Final losing to rivals Baxter in 2011/12. Season 2012/13 looked promising with the inclusion of ex-Victorian batsman Nick Jewell who scored 3 centuries before the Christmas interval, going on to win the Club Championship with 706 runs and 7 catches.

The original Macfarlan Reserve pavilion was erected in 1935 with a terraced grandstand upstairs. It was demolished and completely rebuilt in 1984 and re-opened as the Robert (Bob) Keegan pavilion in 1985. Several balconies have been added since. Plans exist to add a gymnasium when funds are available.

The Sorrento Tennis Club originally occupied the land beside the Museum and is a sunken garden today. It was relocated to its current site in the 1960s followed by the Scout Hall and fire track a decade or so later. Netball courts, a skate park and basketball stadium followed creating a single sports complex together with the lawn bowls rinks.

Golfers play at the course of the Sorrento Golf Club on Langford Road.

== Sorrento Cemetery ==
Dame Nellie Melba sang to raise funds for cemetery gates which rusted over time and were taken down and dumped at the tip where they were souvenired and used as a garden ornament. Notable interments include Federal Senator John Button, Member of the Legislative Assembly of Victoria, Vin Heffernan, actor Sophie Heathcote, naturalist Edith Coleman, cricketer Shane Warne and Dame Zara Bate, the wife of former Prime Minister of Australia Harold Holt who disappeared at nearby Cheviot Beach. Ronald Joseph Walker AC CBE was an Australian businessman best known for his work in managing sporting events. As well as serving as Lord Mayor of Melbourne from 1974 to 1976.

== See also ==
- Shire of Flinders – Sorrento was previously within this former local government area.
- Port Phillip Bay Bridge proposals
