= Alfresco =

Alfresco may refer to:

- Al fresco, or fresco, a technique of mural painting
- Outdoor dining, also known as al fresco dining
- Alfresco Software, an open-source content-management system
- Alfresco (TV series), a 1980s British television comedy series
- Al fresco, colloquial allusion meaning the same as going commando
