= Surf Coast Highway =

Semi-rural highway in Victoria, Australia

Surfcoast Highway Torquay Road Victoria
- Coordinates: 38.182340°S 144.344867°E (North end); 38.338131°S 144.314679°E (South end)

General information
- Type: Highway
- Length: 17.8 km (11 mi)
- Route number(s): B100 (1996–present)
- Former route number: State Route 100 (1986–1996)
- Tourist routes: Tourist Drive 21

Major junctions
- North end: Torquay Road; Belmont, Geelong
- Princes Highway; Pioneer Road; Baanip Boulevard; Lower Duneed Road
- South end: Great Ocean Road; Torquay, Victoria

Highway system
- Highways in Australia; National Highway • Freeways in Australia; Highways in Victoria

Surfcoast Highway (and its northern section within Geelong as Torquay Road, and its southern section as Surf Coast Highway) is a semi-rural highway in Victoria, Australia, connecting the city of Geelong with the coastal town of Torquay. The highway runs through the Armstrong Creek Growth Area, which is the subject of extensive residential development; closer to Torquay, tourist attractions the Narana Creations indigenous centre, Surf Coast Plaza retail centre, and the Surfworld museum are located along the highway.

== Route ==
Surfcoast Highway commences at the intersection with Settlement Road in Belmont and runs south as Torquay Road as a four-lane, dual-carriageway road through the southern Geelong suburb of Grovedale and crossing the Warrnambool railway line, continuing south until it reaches the intersection of Lower Duneed Road in Mount Duneed. It changes name to Surf Coast Highway and continues south, eventually running through central Torquay, before ending at the bridge over Spring Creek, where the road continues west as the Great Ocean Road.

== History ==
Construction to duplicate the Surfcoast Highway, 13.2km total between Grovedale and Torquay, commenced in November 1990, to aid higher traffic levels due to tourism and holidays and the growth of Torquay and neighbouring Jan Juc. Work was completed and opened in June 1993, for a total cost of $13.3 million. A link between Surfcoast Highway and Geelong Ring Road, named Baanip Boulevard, was completed in June 2015.

Surfcoast Highway was signed as State Route 100 between Grovedale and Torquay in 1986; with Victoria's conversion to the newer alphanumeric system in the late 1990s, this was updated to route B100 in 1996.

The passing of the Road Management Act 2004 granted the responsibility of overall management and development of Victoria's major arterial roads to VicRoads: in 2004, VicRoads re-declared the road as Surfcoast Highway (Arterial #6190), beginning at Corio-Waurn Ponds Road (today Settlement Road) at Belmont and ending at Great Ocean Road in Torquay; this declaration formally includes today's Torquay Road, but signposts along this section have kept its original name.

== Major intersections ==
| LGA | Location | km | mi | Destinations | Notes |
|---|---|---|---|---|---|
| Greater Geelong | Belmont | 0.0 | 0.0 | Torquay Road (north) – Belmont | Northern terminus of Surfcoast Highway (declared) and route B100; Northern end of Torquay Road (sign-posted) |
| Greater Geelong | Belmont | 0.0 | 0.0 | Settlement Road (A10 west, A10/Tourist Drive 21 east) – Colac, Geelong | |
| Warn Ponds Creek | | 1.0 | 0.62 | Bridge (name unknown) | |
| Greater Geelong | Grovedale | 2.3 | 1.4 | Pioneer Road (C133) – Highton | |
| Greater Geelong | Grovedale–Mount Duneed–Charlemont tripoint | 3.2 | 2.0 | Warrnambool railway line | |
| Greater Geelong | Mount Duneed–Charlemont boundary | 3.5 | 2.2 | Baanip Boulevard (B130) – Waurn Ponds, to Geelong Ring Road (M1) – Colac, Melbourne | |
| Greater Geelong–Surf Coast boundary | Mount Duneed | 7.4 | 4.6 | Lower Duneed Road (C122 east) – Barwon Heads, Ocean Grove; Mount Duneed Road (west) – Mount Duneed | Southern end of Torquay Road, northern end of Surf Coast Highway (sign-posted) |
| Thompsons Creek | | 10.1 | 6.3 | Bridge (name unknown) | |
| Surf Coast | Torquay | 17.8 | 11.1 | Great Ocean Road (B100/Tourist Drive 21) – Lorne, Apollo Bay, Warrnambool | Southern terminus of Surfcoast Highway (declared), southern end of Surf Coast Highway (sign-posted); Route B100 continues west over Spring Creek along Great Ocean Road |
| Spring Creek | | 17.8 | 11.1 | Bridge (name unknown) | |
1.000 mi = 1.609 km; 1.000 km = 0.621 mi: Route transition
