= Waurn Ponds =

- Suburb
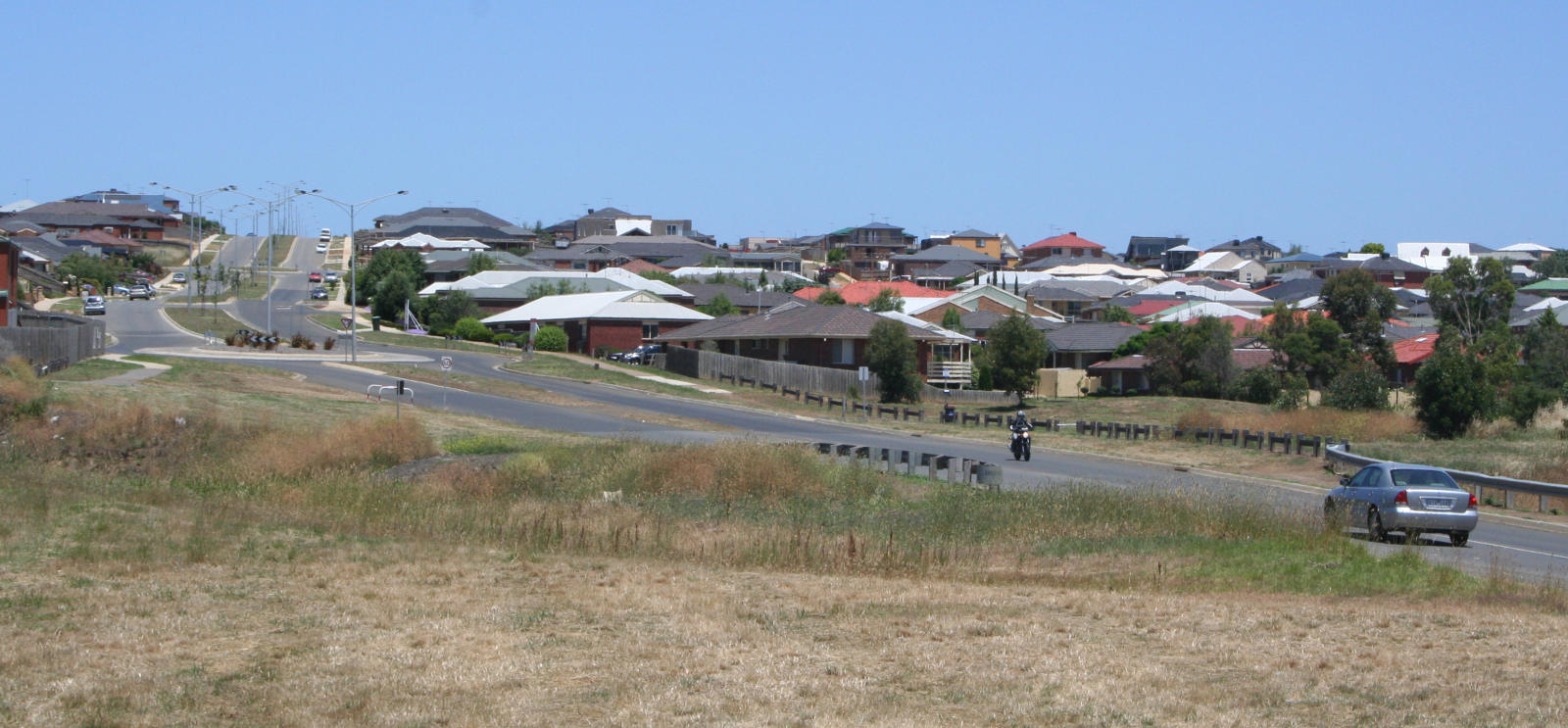
- View of the suburb south from Rossack Drive

- Interactive map of Waurn Ponds
- Coordinates: 38°13′S 144°17′E
- Country: Australia
- State: Victoria
- City: Geelong
- LGA: City of Greater Geelong

Government
  - State electorate: South Barwon
  - Federal division: Corangamite

Population
  - Total: 5,046 (2016 census)
- Postcode: 3216
Suburbs around Waurn Ponds
Barrabool	Ceres	Wandana Heights
Barrabool and Mount Moriac	Waurn Ponds	Highton
Mount Moriac	Mount Duneed	Grovedale

Waurn Ponds is a mainly residential southern suburb of Geelong, Victoria, Australia.

The suburb is bounded by Rossack Drive, Princes Highway, the Geelong to Warrnambool railway, Reservoir Road, Draytons Road, Pigdons Road, Deakin University and Honeys Road. It is home to the main Geelong campus of Deakin University and the regional Waurn Ponds Shopping Centre. There are many schools around Waurn Ponds including Mount Duneed Regional Primary School.

== History ==
The town was named after the Waurn chain of ponds, a watercourse that flows from Mount Moriac over 30 km into the Barwon River.

'Waurn' meaning "place of many houses" in reference to Aboriginal stone houses in the Wathaurong language, though there is no evidence of this outside of Mr Pascoes book.

It is thought that the name derives from an Aboriginal word meaning camp, although another authority states that the original name was Warren's Chain of Ponds.

Two early hotels – the Victoria Inn (1845–60) and the Waurn Ponds Inn (1856) were located on the Princes Highway serving travellers on the road. The Albert and Victoria vineyards, owned by David Pettavel, began growing grapes in 1848 and the area was better known as Pettavel in the 1860s. The Pettavel Post Office opened on 12 January 1865 and remained open until 1952. The Waurn Ponds Post Office opened on 1 December 1871 and closed in 1968.

A quarry for limestone was opened in the 1840s, with quarrying continuing from 1964 to today at the nearby Blue Circle Southern cement works. Kilns for making mortar lime operated until the 1970s.

== Waurn Ponds Memorial Reserve ==
The Waurn Ponds Memorial Reserve (previously known as the Avenue of Honour) is located on the corner of Cochranes Road and Waurn Ponds Drive, Waurn Ponds. The Avenue of Honour was planted in July 1919 by the residents of Waurn Ponds as a tribute to the Waurn Ponds World War I servicemen.

In 1999, the Government of Victoria decided to sell the Avenue of Honour. Local residents and the Victorian RSL president Bruce Ruxton campaigned that the Avenue of Honour would not be auctioned and that the site be protected. The Government of Victoria overturned the sale of the Waurn Ponds Memorial Reserve and a Committee of Management was appointed with Jack Harriott as the chairman.

A re-dedication service was held during which a plaque listing the Waurn Ponds World War I servicemen was unveiled. In 2000, another two plaques were added with additional Waurn Ponds servicemen who served in World War I and a further plaque honouring the Waurn Ponds servicemen and servicewomen who served in World War II.

Today there are plaques acknowledging those who served in the Korean War, the Vietnam War and Royal Australian Air Force nurses and servicewomen from the Geelong area. The Memorial Reserve is also home to a 3.7 Anti Aircraft Gun. An annual memorial service is held on the first Sunday of July to mark the anniversary of the Waurn Ponds Memorial Reserve.

== Waurn Ponds Hall ==
The Waurn Ponds Hall which is located on 225 Waurn Ponds Drive was erected in 1924 as mechanics institute and free library. The Hall is now used for many local events and can be hired for private functions. The back of the Waurn Ponds Hall was the original Waurn Ponds State School which was relocated to Grovedale Primary School and later back to the Waurn Ponds Hall as an extension.

Waurn Ponds started to become part of the outer suburbs of Geelong from the 1970s, with the opening of the Deakin University campus and the Waurn Ponds Hotel on the highway. Major development did not begin until the early 1990s, based around Ghazeepore Road. The intervening years have seen housing developments spread across the hillside towards Grovedale.

=== Heritage listed sites ===
Waurn Ponds contains a number of heritage listed sites, including:

- Princes Highway and 110 Lemins Road, Lime Burning Kiln
- Princes Highway, Waurn Ponds Creek Bridge

== Geography ==
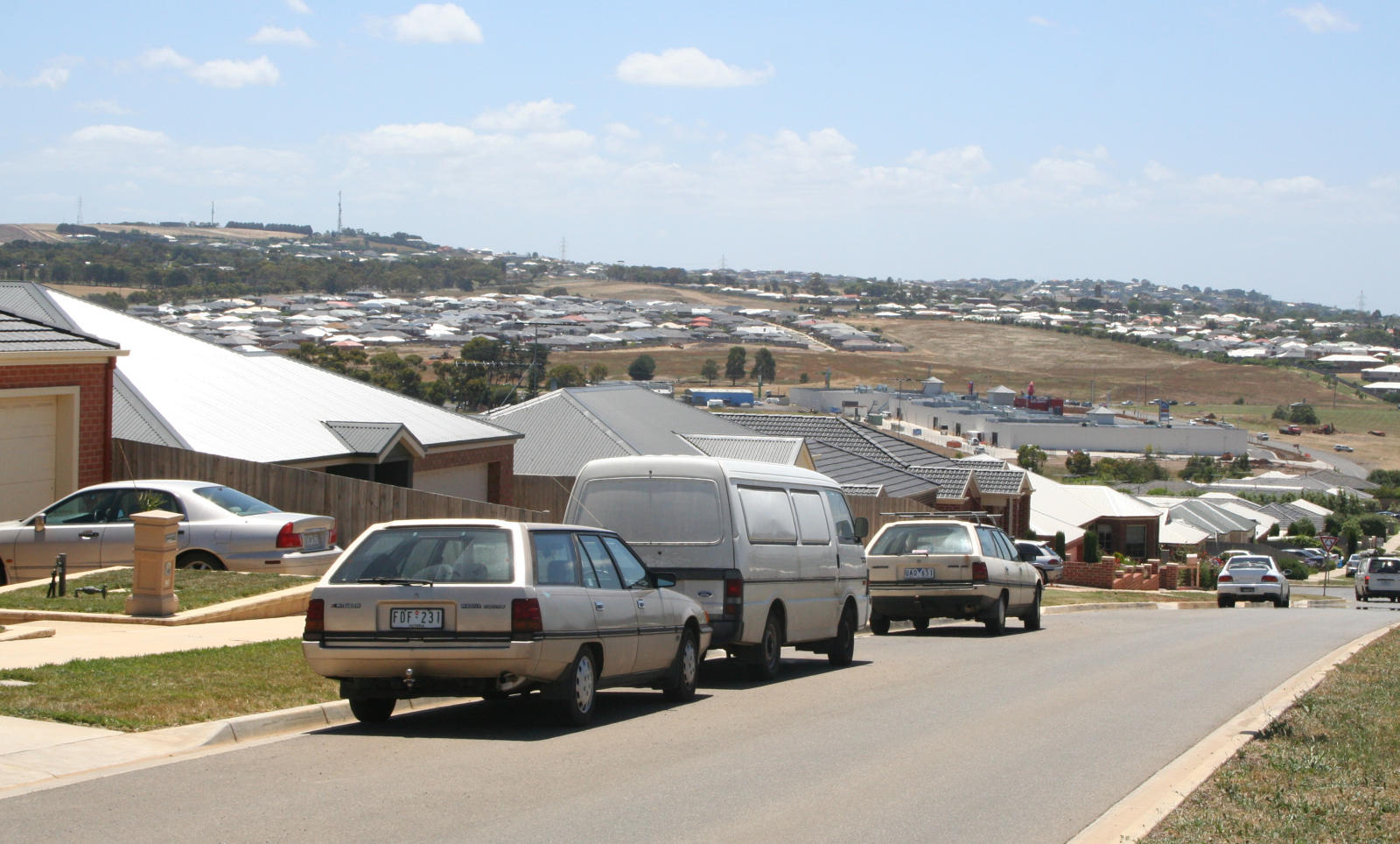
Looking north towards Highton

Waurn Ponds is home to the quite small Waurn Ponds Creek. It starts around the Mount Moriac region and eventually flows into the Barwon River near Belmont Common.

As of 2007, it is low on water and is no more than one metre deep in most sections. It has a large weed problem which makes the creek look uninhabitable. The creek is home to many species of fish (many introduced) including Carp, Redfin, Roach, Tench, Australian Grayling and short finned eels. The creek also is a large habitat of native birds including the pacific black duck. Increase in annual rain will bring the creek back to its original status.

== Community groups ==
The Friends of the Waurn Ponds Creek is a community group that gather on the first and third Sunday of the month to protect and conserve the health of the Waurn Ponds Creek and surrounding area. The Friends started in 2002 and have won awards for their dedication and work towards enhancing the creek to protect the native fish and wildlife that inhabit the creek and its surrounds. The Friends plant trees, clean up rubbish and maintain weeds and tree planting sites.

Waurn Ponds has a large linear parkland following the creek. The neighbouring suburb of Grovedale has a skate park and baseball complex.

The boundaries of Waurn Ponds were expanded in 2012 when, as a result of boundary changes related to the development of the nearby Armstrong Creek Growth Area, an area of land in the west of the current suburb between the Princes Highway and the Geelong-Warrnambool railway line was shifted from the locality of Mount Duneed to Waurn Ponds.

== Sport ==
The Waurn Ponds Tennis Club located on 20 Belperroud Road off Waurn Ponds Drive, is a successful tennis club which has junior and senior competitions in the Tennis Geelong Competition.

The Waurn Ponds Cricket Club located on Waurn Ponds Drive (accessible via Jarvis Rd in the Deakin University complex) was established in 1986 and currently has a senior men's team and junior sides. The club is in the Geelong Cricket Association.

Deakin Ducks Football Club is an amateur soccer club based at the Deakin University Elite Sports Precinct.

== Transport ==
Waurn Ponds is located on the Princes Highway which links the suburb with the centre of Geelong. It is also the southern endpoint of the Geelong Ring Road, completed in 2009. Anglesea Road heads south through the suburb, linking the area to Torquay and Anglesea. Pioneer Road links the region west to Grovedale, the road not being completed eastward across the Waurn Ponds Creek until the mid-1990s.

=== Rail ===
The Geelong V/Line rail service between Geelong and Melbourne was extended to the new Waurn Ponds railway station in Sugargum Drive in 2014. The new station was originally named Grovedale in the planning stages, despite being physically located in Waurn Ponds, but the official name of Waurn Ponds was announced in July 2014. An earlier extension of Geelong line rail services in the direction of Waurn Ponds had been considered when funding was set aside for a new station beyond South Geelong station in 2003–04, but that eventually resulted in the new station being built at Marshall, closer to Geelong, instead.

=== Bus ===
Public transport to the area is provided by buses operated by CDC Geelong and McHarry's Buslines, under contract to Public Transport Victoria. Routes to the Geelong city centre originate and terminate at Deakin University.

- 1 : North Shore – Deakin University, via Grovedale, Belmont, South Geelong railway station, Geelong West and North Geelong
- 40 : Geelong railway station – Deakin University, via Grovedale, Waurn Ponds Shopping Centre, Marshall railway station, Breakwater and East Geelong
- 41 : Geelong railway station – Deakin University, via Waurn Ponds railway station, Grovedale, Waurn Ponds Shopping Centre, Belmont and South Geelong
- 42 : Geelong railway station – Deakin University, via Waurn Ponds railway station, Grovedale, Waurn Ponds Shopping Centre, Highton and Belmont
- 43 : Geelong railway station – Deakin University, via Highton and Newtown

== University ==
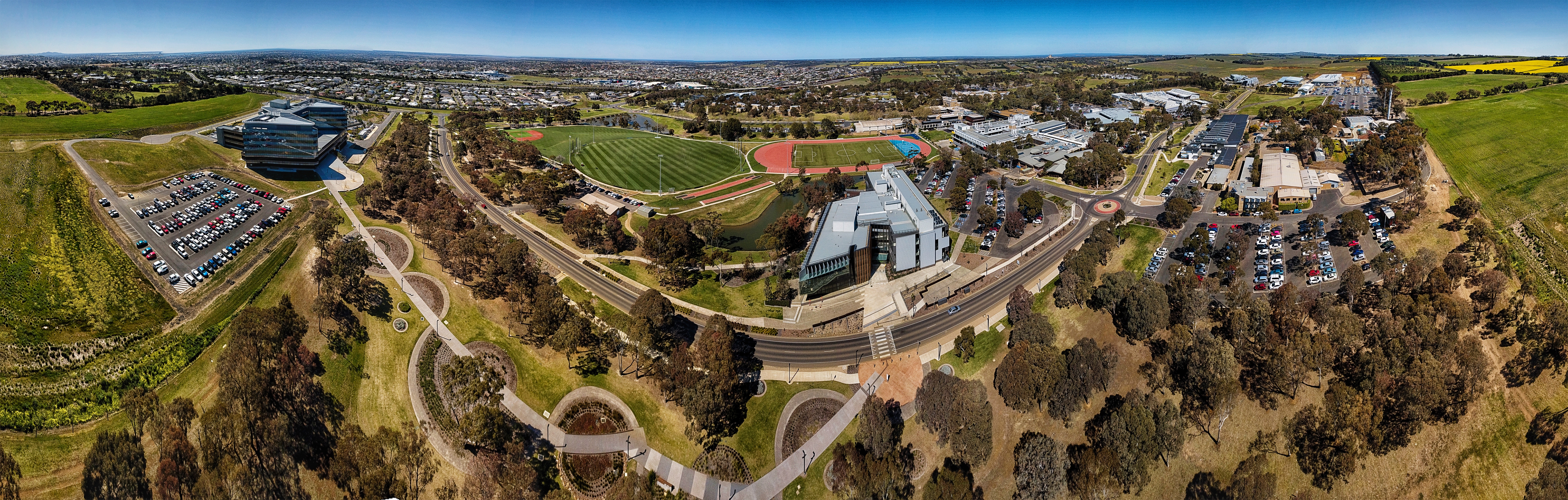
Aerial panorama of Deakin University's Waurn Pond Campus. Shot at altitude of 110m. September 2018.

The Deakin University campus at Waurn Ponds had its beginnings in the Gordon Institute of TAFE, who purchased land there in 1969. A building for the Applied Sciences was first built, followed by a library and student lodgings in 1975. In 1976 the Gordon Institute was divided into two parts, with academic courses becoming part of the newly formed Deakin University based at the Waurn Ponds campus.

Deakin enrolled its first students at its Waurn Ponds campus in 1977. Today the university is located on a 365-hectare (900-acre) site, has over 1,000 staff and over 4000 on-campus students.

Deakin offers many social groups for students to join. The main association is DUSA, followed closely by the Deakin Students' Commerce Society. Deakin University Student Association#Deakin Commerce Students' Society

== Retail ==
The Waurn Ponds Shopping Centre, located on the corner of Colac Road (Princes Highway) and Pioneer Road, is a regional-level shopping centre servicing the southern suburbs of Geelong and the surrounding region. It was opened in the early 1990s, and has been continually expanded. The most recent expansion, completed in August 2014, increased the total area of the centre to 47,000 square metres. There are over 160 different shops.

The Geelong Homemaker Centre, located on the Colac Road (Princes Highway) at the intersection of Pigdons Road, opened in mid-2005.

Waurn Ponds Plaza, located at the intersection of Rossack Drive and the Colac Road (Princes Highway), is another shopping centre in Waurn Ponds. It is the location of the office of the federal member for Corangamite, Libby Coker.
