= Geelong Ring Road =

Freeway in Victoria, Australia

Geelong Ring Road Victoria
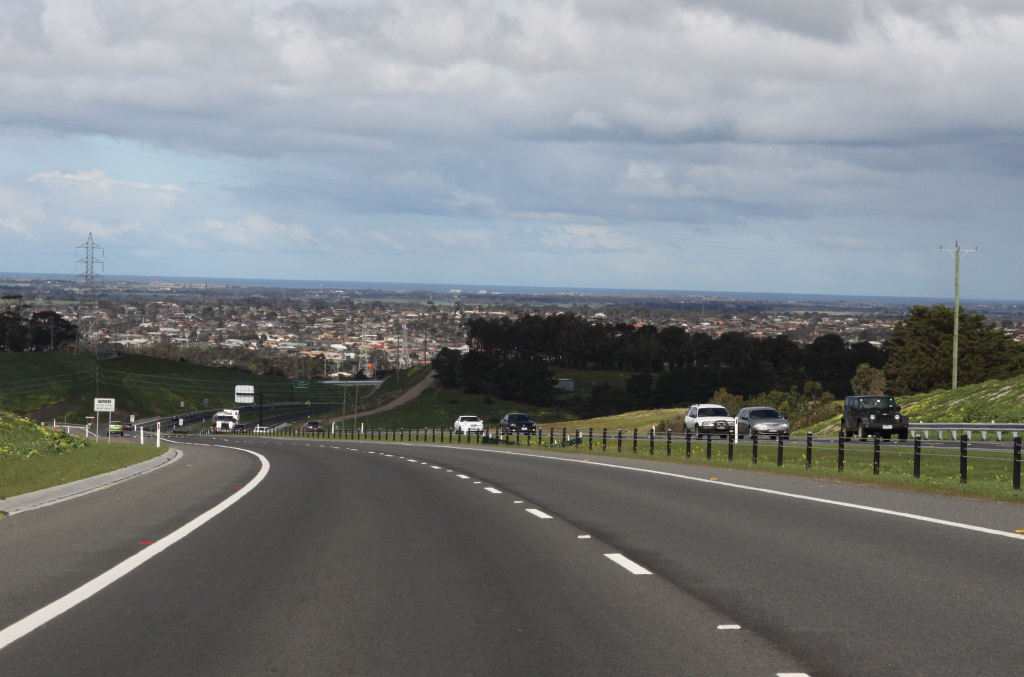
- Descending from Barrabool Road, looking south towards Waurn Ponds
- Coordinates: 38.056583°S 144.389443°E (NE end); 38.211810°S 144.255575°E (SW end)

General information
- Type: Freeway
- Length: 27.6 km (17 mi)
- Opened: 2008–2013
- Route number(s): (2009–present)

Major junctions
- NE end: Princes Freeway; Corio, Geelong
- Midland Highway; Hamilton Highway; Princes Highway
- SW end: Princes Highway; Waurn Ponds, Victoria

Location(s)
- LGA(s): City of Greater Geelong
- Major suburbs / towns: Lovely Banks, Bell Post Hill, Hamlyn Heights, Fyansford, Wandana Heights, Waurn Ponds

Highway system
- Highways in Australia; National Highway • Freeways in Australia; Highways in Victoria

The Geelong Ring Road (formerly known as the Geelong Bypass and the Geelong Outer Freeway, officially part of Princes Freeway West) is a freeway ring road in Australia beside Geelong's western suburbs from the Princes Freeway at Corio to the Princes Highway at Waurn Ponds. It also connects to the Midland Highway towards Ballarat, and the Hamilton Highway.

== History ==
One of the first plans for a ring road of Geelong dates back to 7 March 1969, when a report was released by the then Geelong Regional Planning Authority. It said that the ring road could be delayed for up to 15 years.

In the mid-1970s the Geelong Regional Planning Authority, Chairman by Colin K. Atkins OAM, sponsored the Geelong Transportation Plan, which canvassed a number of options for major road construction in the area. One was for a north–south freeway along the line of Latrobe Terrace, though Geelong West and Chilwell, and another was for Aberdeen Street to be upgraded into a major road with the acquisition of 99 houses. Any freeway construction through the suburbs of the city was vetoed after residents objections. The final plan advocated the construction of what became the Geelong Ring Road, although it also proposed that Latrobe Terrace become a 4-lane arterial road.

In 1979 a Melbourne firm carried out acoustic testing at Wandana Heights to ascertain the impact of a freeway. The alignment was finalised in 1979 and appeared as a proposed freeway in the Melway street directory for a number of years.

Growing traffic volumes through the centre of Geelong led to Latrobe Terrace being converted into a major arterial road in early 1989, with the construction of a bridge over the Geelong-Melbourne railway line at its northern end, and the James Harrison Bridge over the Barwon River at its southern end.

=== Road classification ===
The passing of the Road Management Act 2004 granted the responsibility of overall management and development of Victoria's major arterial roads to VicRoads: in 2012, VicRoads declared the road as part of the Princes Freeway West (Freeway #1500), beginning at Corio-Waurn Ponds Road (Princes Highway) at Corio and ending in Waurn Ponds.

== Sections ==
The project was renamed the Geelong Ring Road on 20 February 2007.

Construction on the Geelong Ring Road began in early 2006 with the freeway section to Waurn Ponds scheduled for completion in 2009. A total of $384 million from the Victorian and Federal Governments was committed initially to fund the first three sections of the project.

The Geelong Ring Road (freeway type) was to be constructed in three sections as follows:

- Section 1: Princes Freeway, Corio to Midland Highway, Bell Post Hill
- Section 2: Midland Highway, Hamlyn Heights to Hamilton Highway, Fyansford
- Section 3: Hamilton Highway, Fyansford to Princes Highway, Waurn Ponds

There was much local debate on the proposed route for Section 3. The final decision was made on 7 July 2006, while construction commenced in September 2007. It was ultimately decided that there would be no toll when the Geelong Ring Road opened to traffic.

Sections 1 and 2 were officially opened on Sunday, 14 December 2008. Two days of torrential rain beforehand threatened to disrupt the opening, however it went ahead as planned after a cessation of the storm. The two sections were opened by Victorian Premier John Brumby, who announced the naming of the feature bridge on stage two of the road as the "Lewis Bandt Bridge", in honour of the Ford Australia engineer who is credited as the inventor of the Utility vehicle, in Geelong. Section 3 was opened in June 2009.

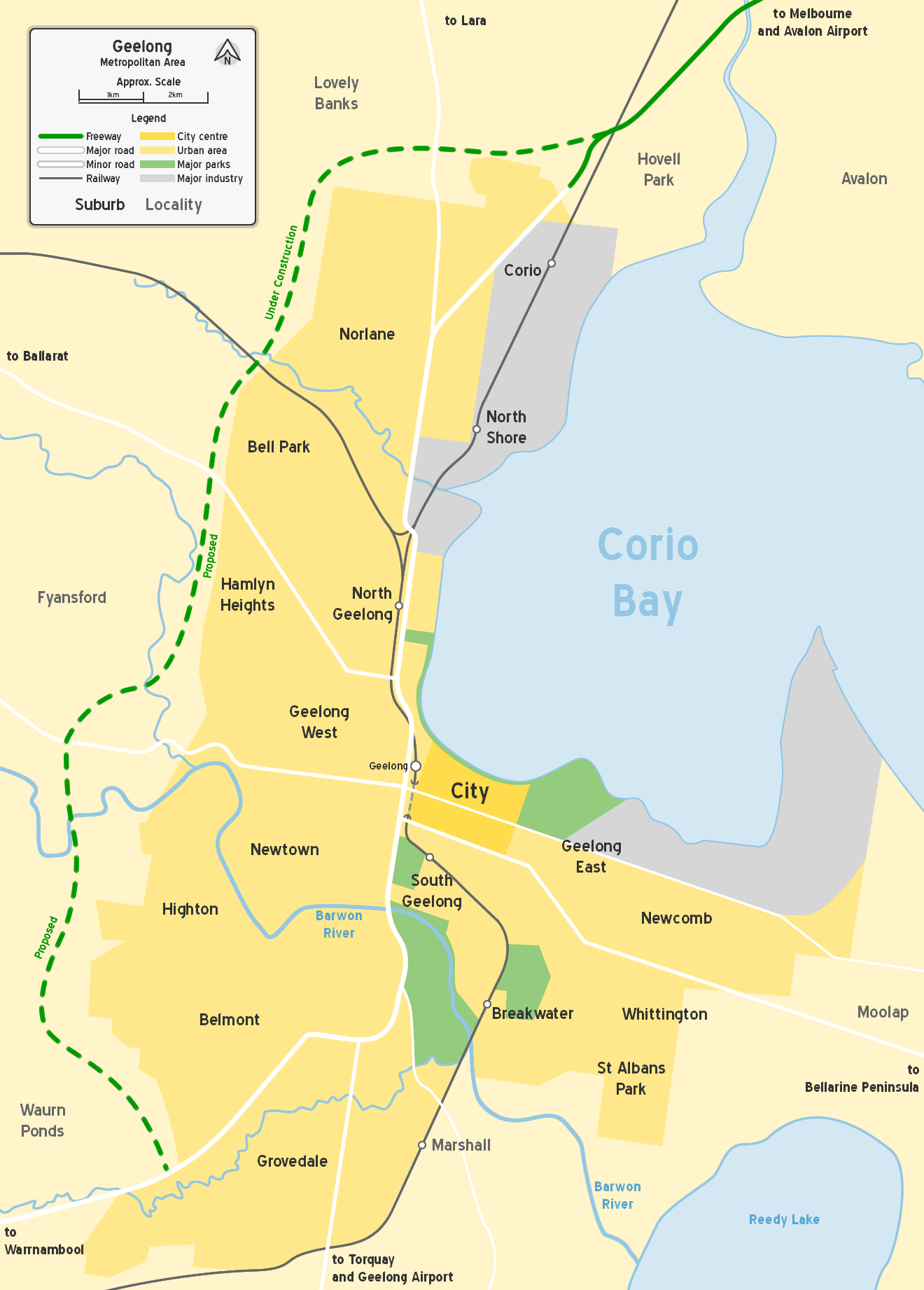
Map detailing the planned route of the Geelong Ring Road (green dotted line).

- Section 4: split into three sub-sections:
  - Stage 4A (Connection from Geelong Ring Road to Anglesea Road)
  - Stage 4B (Connection from Anglesea Road - Princes Highway West)
  - Stage 4C (Surf Coast Highway connection, later renamed Baanip Boulevard)

In October 2007, during the 2007 federal election campaign the Labor party promised $107.5 million for the fourth stage of the road. It was made up of $45 million for stage 4B, on top of their promise made in September for $62.5 million towards Stage 4A. In May 2008 stages 4A and 4B were given the go ahead, with State Premier John Brumby announcing $65 million in funding for stage 4B, in addition to earlier State Government funding of $63 million for stage 4A. Running from the Princes Highway at Waurn Ponds; it will run from Anglesea Road near Hams Road, through the Blue Circle Quarry to the Princes Highway, near Draytons Road. On 17 December 2008 a $62 million contract was awarded to Fulton Hogan to design and build section 4A of the ring road to Anglesea Road. Section 4A opened in December 2011, and Section 4B opened in February 2013.

The State and Federal Governments have also each committed $110 million to duplicate the Princes Highway to Winchelsea. An extra stage connecting the road to the Surf Coast Highway was also investigated. This stage (Section 4C) opened on 3 June 2015, six months ahead of schedule, and later gazetted as Baanip Boulevard, after Willem Baa Nip, a local Wathaurung man well known to the Geelong community during the 1800s.

A shared bicycle and pedestrian pathway has also been built along the freeway from Broderick Road, Corio to Church Street, Hamlyn Heights. Built at a cost of $4 million, the trail will not connect into the Geelong bicycle network, due to a short missing link between Church Street and the Fyansford Common.

=== Future ===
A future extension of the Ring Road known as Section 5 or the Bellarine Link has been proposed which will extend the Geelong Ring Road from Baanip Boulevard to Portarlington Road. Since 2017, early planning has been undertaken by the Victorian Government to determine a preferred alignment for a future extension, however it is unlikely that this section will be built in the short-term. Community consultation was undertaken in December 2021. As of April 2024, the link is still being planned and developed.

== Construction ==
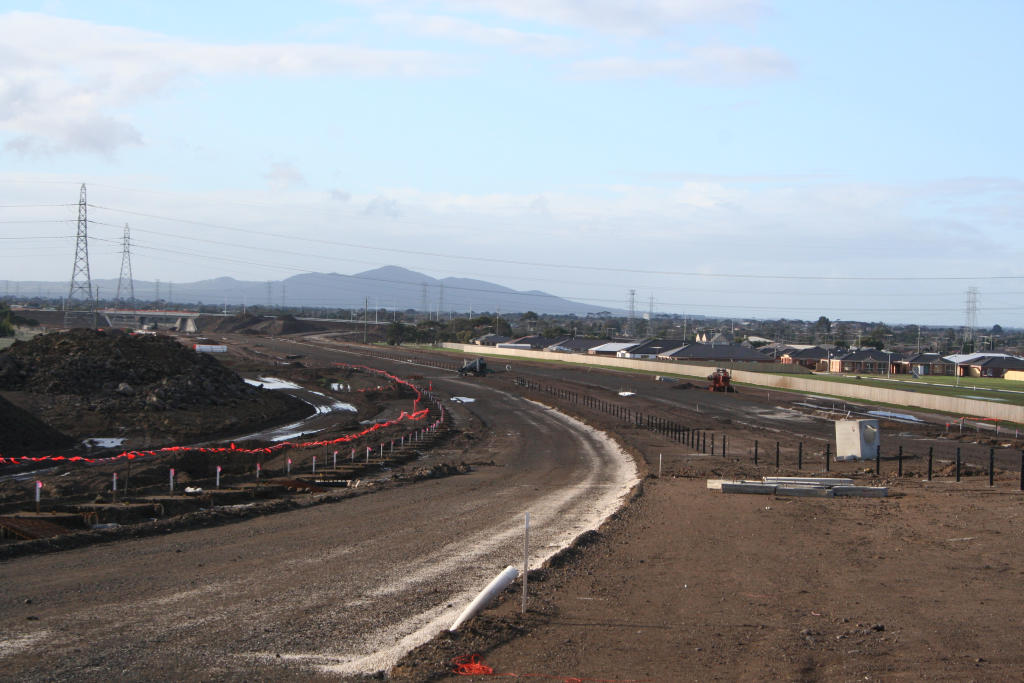
Geelong Ring Road under construction in 2007 at Bell Post Hill.

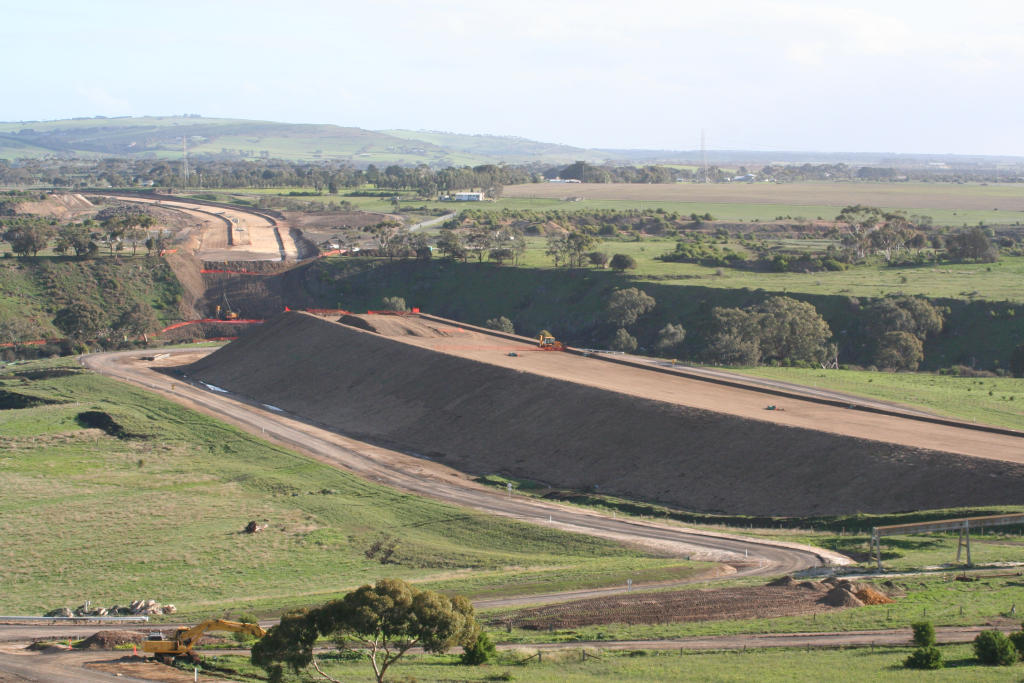
Lewis Bandt Bridge over the Moorabool River under construction in 2007

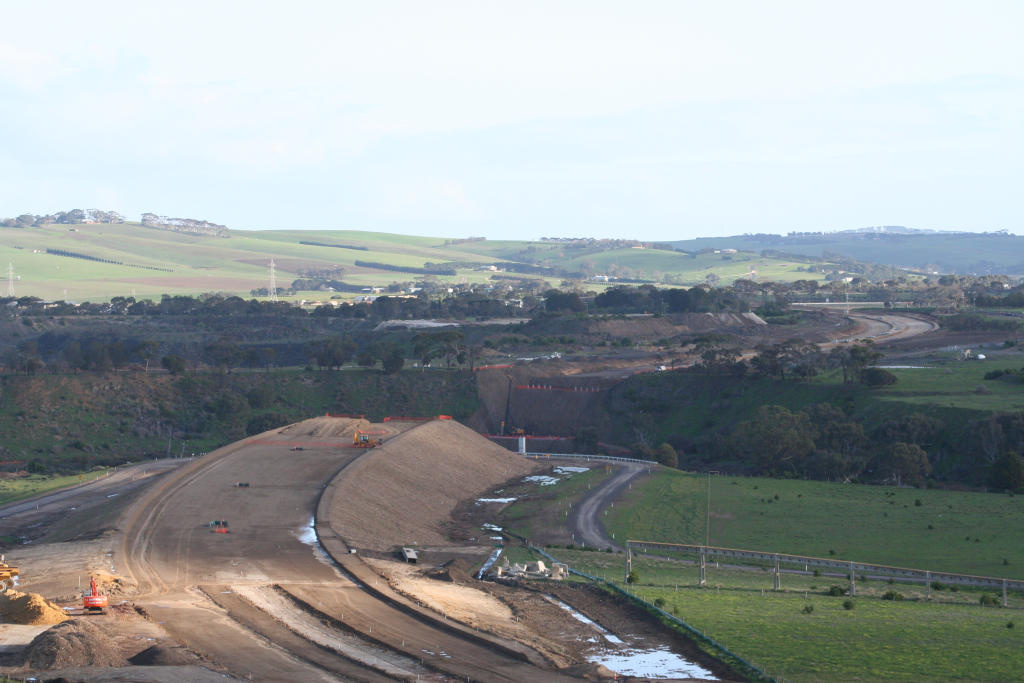
Lewis Bandt Bridge under construction in 2007

Sections 1 and 2

The design and construction contract for the 10.5 km-long (6.5 mi) section 1 was awarded to Abigroup in November 2005 for $134.8 million. Construction work commenced on 17 February 2006. Section 2 was delivered via two separate design and construction contracts. The contract for 4.5 kilometres (2.8 mi) of freeway was awarded to Cut and Fill Pty Ltd for $31.7 million, while FRH (now Fulton Hogan) won the $15.5 million contract for the Moorabool River bridges. Construction work on section two commenced on 27 September 2006.

The Creamery Road overpass in Bell Post Hill was the first major element of the project to be opened in January 2007 (a number of minor access road deviations had been completed earlier). The Broderick Road overpass was opened in November 2007. The 200m long bridges over the Moorabool River, the largest on the project, had the final span installed on 6 March 2008. The bridges contain 70 beams and have 12 piers.

In 2007 VicRoads said that section one was to be completed by February 2008, but by that time completion had been pushed out to the middle of 2008. By this time earth works were completed on stage two, with 700,000 cubic metres of earth moved, and installation of noise walls had started along with landscaping.

By May 2008 completion of stages one and two of the road has been delayed until November, with VicRoads stating that "wet and cold weather in recent weeks had prevented sealing the road surface". At this time the Victorian Government permitted the filming of a plane crash scene from the Nicolas Cage film Knowing on the incomplete road at Corio.

Local police expressed concerns about a staged opening of the road, with drivers using temporary shortcuts not suited to heavy traffic and large vehicles.

Construction on sections 1 and 2 reached practical completion when the road opened to traffic on 14 December 2008.

Section 3

The $108.3 million design and construction contract for section 3 was awarded on 25 July 2007 to Abigroup. Section three works include 7.5 kilometres of freeway, the transportation of 4.7 million cubic metres of earth, and twin 110-metre long bridges over the Barwon River. Construction of section 3 commenced on 14 September 2007.

By February 2008 550,000 cubic metres of earth had been moved to the north and south of Barrabool Road, and the foundation works for the arch structure over Wandana Drive were complete. Section three was originally scheduled for completion in the second half of 2009 however it was announced in early June 2009 that section three would open 6 months early on 14 June 2009.

Section 4A

The design and construction contract for section 4A was awarded to Fulton Hogan on 16 December 2008 for $61.7 million. Construction began in March 2009 and was completed by the end of 2011.

== Economic benefits ==
The freeway saves fuel and travel time for commuters and cargo trucks.

The completion of the Geelong Ring Road was expected to bring large economic benefits to the region. Approximately 582 hectares (1,440 acres) of land west of the road has been identified for use as new industrial land, however resistance from nearby residents in the Lovely Banks area to two service station developments cast some cloud over future development.

== Criticism ==
Some opponents of the construction of the Geelong Ring Road feared that the inclusion of the road in the local Geelong roads ecosystem would have adversely affected the environmental conditions in the Geelong area. One point made was that it would "generate millions of tons of carbon dioxide and carbon monoxide pollution in the Geelong and Corio Bay region".

More likely however is that the overall difference would not be significant, as traffic that would previously have travelled through the centre of Geelong via the main Melbourne Road/Latrobe Terrace/James Harrison Bridge/Settlement Road/High Street/Princes Highway West corridor, would now travel via the Geelong Ring Road, improving the environmental condition for the majority of Geelong residents, by removing that traffic from the most heavily populated areas of the city. There has been no environmental study that shows that the construction of the Geelong Ring Road would adversely affect the environment.

The loss of amenity experienced by residents in the immediate vicinity of the freeway corridor due to the severing of a number of local roads was also a source of criticism, but most of these roads have been reconnected via upgraded existing roads, or the addition of new roads.

The main opposition to this project had nothing to do with environmental issues. In 1991 VicRoads undertook its own study and decided to abandon plans to utilise the Section 3 route in favour of a bypass from Avalon Road across Corio Bay to Point Henry and then along the Barwon River valley to the Surf Coast Highway, Anglesea Road and Princes Highway West.

As a result of VicRoads decision the freeway reservation south of Princes Highway West to the Anglesea Road was abandoned and was developed as residential allotments with the approval of VicRoads and South Barwon Council.

Over the next 11 years many people built houses along the route especially from Wandana Drive to the Princes Highway West. Then in 2001 the Victorian Government initiated a project to investigate options for a Geelong Bypass. It involved a steering committee, technical committee and Community consultation committee. After 18 months the expectations based on information provided to participants was that the VicRoads preferred route would be recommended. To the surprise of almost all Westconnect - the route to the west of Geelong including the abandoned Section 3 was recommended. Much later it was found that someone had re-costed the eastern route as a full 2 lanes each way freeway construction - even though such a construction was not warranted - and that re-costing made the eastern route uneconomic.

Immediately opposition was generated by those who had built close to the Ring Road reservation. VicRoads proposes 4 alternate routes with the result that further opposition was generated from people located close to Options 2 and 3.

In May 2005 during negotiations between Planning Panels Victoria and VicRoads over an environmental Effects process, Planning Panels requested VicRoads minimise the Options to be considered. VicRoads obliged by reducing the Options to 1 and 2 , even though Option 3 was the best Option. As a result, during the EES process a huge amount of pressure was put on the Planning Panel in respect of consideration of Option 3 but they only agreed to consider it if neither 1 or 2 satisfied the criteria being considered. In its recommendation, in spite of neither Option 1 or 2 satisfying the criteria. Planning Panels recommended Option 1 plus an urgent need to consider further work to overcome the problems with Option 1 including the fact it ended in the middle of a commercial area with nowhere to go to connect to Anglesea Road et cetera.

As a result, the estimated cost of the route to Anglesea Road and then around to Princes Highway West is $618 million – about $200 million more than Option 3 plus a connection to Anglesea Road would have cost. In addition the fact that the route is 3 km (2 mi) longer than Option 1, that most freight traffic comes from the west, and the route requires trucks to negotiate slopes down into the Waurn Ponds Valley and then back out again means the additional cost to users is around $10 million per annum. Finally around 360 households are located within 160 metres of the Ring Road and subject to noise and diesel engine particulate matter pollution whereas with the Option 3 route only 10 houses would have been within 160 metres.

== Exits and Interchanges ==
Both Geelong Ring Road and Baanip Boulevard are entirely located within the City of Greater Geelong local government area.

=== Geelong Ring Road ===
Location	km	mi	Destinations	Notes
Corio	0.0	0.0	Princes Freeway (M1/Tourist Route 21) – Werribee, Laverton North, Avalon Airport	Northeastern terminus of ring road, route M1 continues north-east along Princes Freeway
Corio	0.0	0.0	Warrnambool railway line	
Corio	0.0	0.0	Princes Highway (A10/Tourist Route 21) – Norlane, Geelong	Eastbound entrance and westbound exit only
Corio	2.7	1.7	Bacchus Marsh Road (C704) – Bacchus Marsh, Norlane	
Lovely Banks	4.5	2.8	Southbound BP Service Centre	Southbound exit and entrance only
Lovely Banks	4.9	3.0	Northbound BP Service Centre	Northbound exit and entrance only
Lovely Banks	6.2	3.9	Anakie Road – Norlane, Anakie	
Bell Post Hill	7.6	4.7	Geelong–Ballarat and Western SG railway lines	
Bell Post Hill	9.6	6.0	Midland Highway (A300) – Ballarat, Geelong West	
Moorabool River	13.2	8.2	Lewis Bandt Bridge	
Fyansford	14.6	9.1	Hamilton Highway (B140) – Hamilton, Newtown	
Barwon River	15.8	9.8	Geoff Thom Bridge	
Ceres	18.1	11.2	Barrabool Road (C136) – Belmont, Ceres	
Highton	21.6	13.4	Colac Road (A10 west, east) – Waurn Ponds, Grovedale; Rossack Drive (south) – Waurn Ponds	South-westbound exit and north-eastbound entrance only
Waurn Ponds	22.4	13.9	Colac Road (A10 east) – Geelong, Deakin University; Waurn Ponds Drive (west) – Waurn Ponds	Roundabout interchange with northbound exit and southbound entrance
Waurn Ponds	24.5	15.2	Baanip Boulevard (B130 east) – Grovedale, Torquay; Anglesea Road (C134 south) – Bellbrae, Anglesea, to Great Ocean Road	Half-dogbone, half-dumbbell diamond interchange
Waurn Ponds	27.6	17.1	Draytons Road – Waurn Ponds	At-grade intersection
Waurn Ponds	27.6	17.1	Princes Highway (M1) – Colac, Warrnambool, Mount Gambier	Southwestern terminus of ring road, route M1 continues west along Princes Highway
1.000 mi = 1.609 km; 1.000 km = 0.621 mi: Incomplete access; Route transition

=== Baanip Boulevard ===
Location	km	mi	Destinations	Notes
Waurn Ponds	0.0	0.0	Princes Freeway (M1) – Colac, Melbourne	Western terminus of road and route B130
Waurn Ponds	0.0	0.0	Anglesea Road (C134) – Anglesea	
Waurn Ponds	0.5	0.31	Warrnambool railway line	
Mount Duneed	1.1	0.68	Ghazeepore Road – Bellbrae, Waurn Ponds	
Charlemont	4.6	2.9	Surf Coast Highway (B100/Tourist Route 21) – Grovedale, Torquay	Eastern terminus of road and route B130
1.000 mi = 1.609 km; 1.000 km = 0.621 mi: Route transition

== Gallery ==
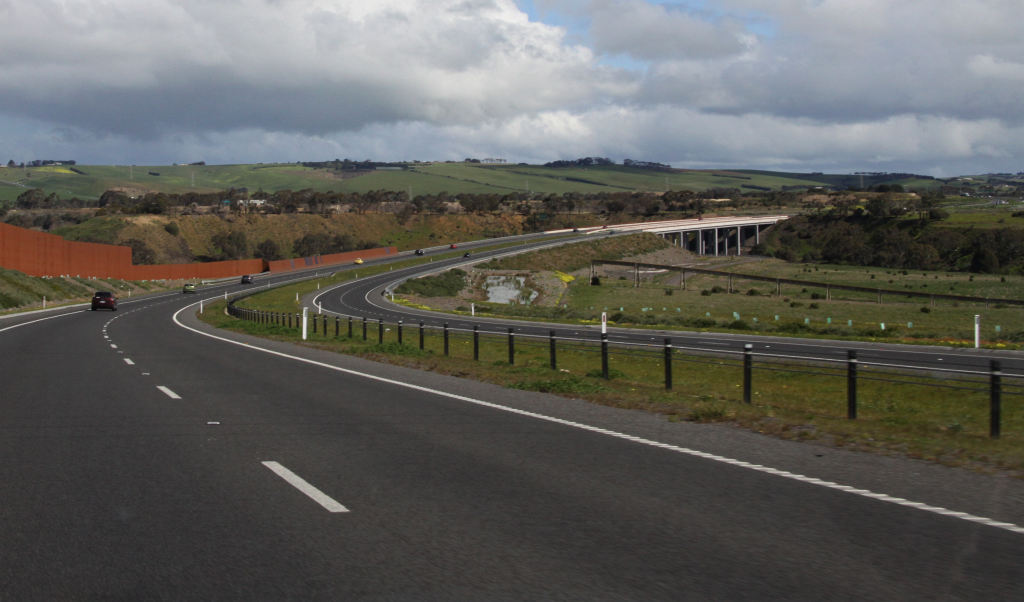
Looking south from the Midland Highway along section 2 towards the Lewis Bandt Bridge and Waurn Ponds.

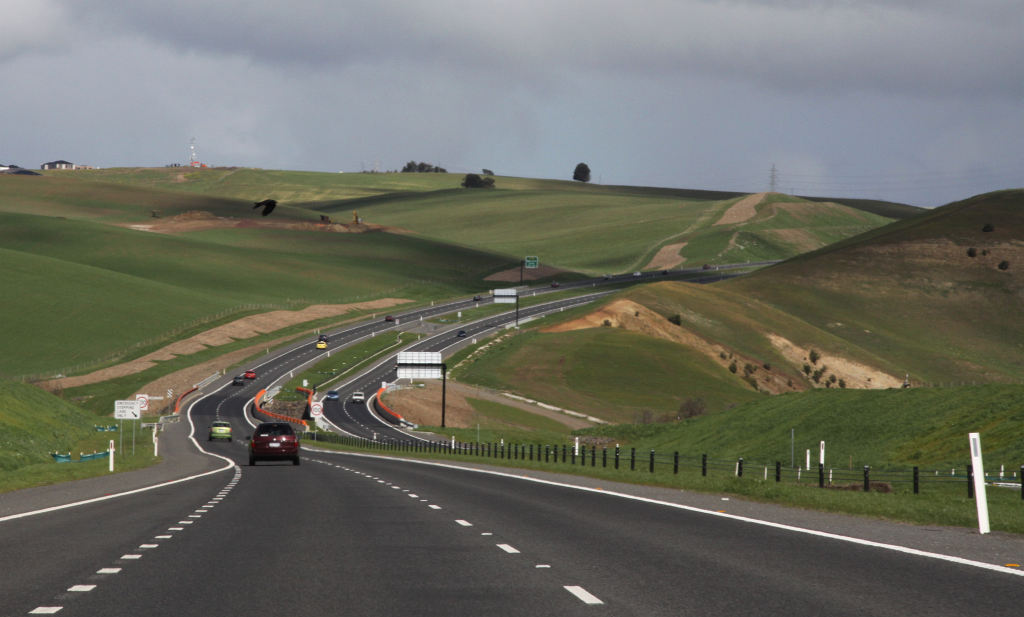
Looking south along section 3 from the Hamilton Highway, towards the Barwon River crossing and the climb over the Barrabool Hills.

== See also ==
- Freeways in Australia
