= Old Princes Highway =

Highway in Australia

Old Princes Highway New South Wales–South Australia

General information
- Type: Road
- Opened: 10 August 1920; 105 years ago

Major junctions
- West end: Princes Highway; Waterfall, New South Wales
- Princes Freeway; Monash Freeway; South Gippsland Freeway; South Gippsland Highway; EastLink; West Gate Freeway; CityLink; CityLink; Midland Highway; Hamilton Highway; Bellarine Highway; Surf Coast Highway
- East end: Karoonda Highway; Murray Bridge, South Australia

Old Princes Highway is a collection of roads in Australia, described as any part of an earlier route designated as Princes Highway, located in New South Wales, Victoria and South Australia.

== History ==
=== Victoria ===
As a named route, the highway came into being when pre-existing roads were renamed Prince's Highway after the planned visit to Australia by the Prince of Wales in 1920. The original submissions in January 1920 were in order for the prince to have the opportunity during his visit to make the trip from Melbourne to Sydney overland along the route. That idea never came to fruition, but the prince did give his permission for the naming. The Victorian section of the highway had an opening ceremony when the first section of road from Melbourne was opened on 10 August 1920 in Warragul.

Approval was later given by the Victorian executive in January 1922 to extend the highway west from Melbourne through Geelong, Camperdown, Warrnambool and Portland to the South Australian border. The passing of the Highways and Vehicles Act 1924 through the Parliament of Victoria provided for the declaration of State Highways, roads two-thirds financed by the state government through the Country Roads Board. Prince's Highway was declared a State Highway on 1 July 1925, traversing the whole length of the state from its western boundary near Mount Gambier in South Australia, through Port Fairy, Warrnambool, Geelong to Melbourne, through Dandenong, Warragul, Sale, Bairnsdale and Orbost to the eastern boundary of the state towards Eden in New South Wales, a total of 870 kilometres.

The passing of the Road Management Act 2004 through the Parliament of Victoria granted the responsibility of overall management and development of Victoria's major arterial roads to VicRoads: VicRoads re-named the road in 2008 as Princes Highway East (Arterial #6510), beginning at the Melbourne CBD to Narre Warren, then through Yarragon, Trafalgar and Morwell, then to the state border with New South Wales. and in 2010 as Princes Highway West (Arterial #6500), beginning at the state border with South Australia to Geelong, then from Altona North to Parkville.

Portions of both the western and eastern section of Princes Highway have further devolved with their own classification and names: the section through Geelong (from Waurn Ponds to Corio) was re-declared in 2012 as Corio–Waurn Ponds Road (Arterial #6800) (following the opening of Geelong Ring Road); the section through Werribee (from Cocoroc to Hoppers Crossing) was re-declared in 2004 as Werribee Main Road (Arterial #5445); the section through outer south-eastern Melbourne (from Berwick to Nar Nar Goon) was re-declared in 2004 as Berwick-Beaconsfield Road (Arterial #5163) and in 2007 as Beaconsfield-Nar Nar Goon Road (Arterial #6460); the section through Drouin and Warragul (signposted as Princes Way) was re-declared in 2004 as Drouin–Warragul Road (Arterial #5594); the section through Moe (signposted as Lloyd Street and Narracan Drive) was re-declared in 2004 as part of Moe-Glengarry Road (Arterial #5539); and the section through Morwell (signposted as Princes Drive) was re-declared in 2004 as part of Morwell-Traralgon Road (Arterial #5921).

The former alignment of Princes Highway through central Melbourne from Parkville to the southern border of the CBD – along Flemington Road (Arterial #5044), Harker Street (Arterial #5026), Curzon Street (Arterial #5027), and King Street (Arterial #5041), – devolved back to their own identities in 2004, no longer part of Princes Highway but not referenced as Old Princes Highway.

=== South Australia ===
The first section of the Princes Highway opened as early as February 1922 via Mount Barker Road and was later realigned to run further along Mount Barker Road through Mount Barker, and along Wellington Road via Wistow and Woodchester to Langhorne Creek, although by 1935 this alignment was changed to run via Nairne, Kanmantoo, Murray Bridge and Tailem Bend (along what is now known as the Old Princes Highway).

The Princes Highway functioned as Adelaide's major south-eastern approach and was heavily trafficked; government plans to upgrade this route weaving through the Adelaide Hills had begun by the early 1960s. Initial sections of the road project that eventually became the South Eastern Freeway commenced in December 1965, along a 2 km section from Measday's Hill to Stirling: the eastbound carriageway was opened to traffic in 1967, and the section was fully completed in 1969 when the remaining carriageway and the Crafers Interchange became fully operational. The next stage extended the freeway east through Bridgewater to Verdun and opened in 1972, and from Verdun to Mount Barker in 1974, completely replacing Princes Highway – renamed back to Mount Barker Road – as the main route between Mount Barker and Crafers. As this was part of Highway 1, the route was progressively re-aligned along the freeway as sections of it opened. The section from Stirling to Mount Barker was later classified as Mount Barker Road, and the Littlehampton to Murray Bridge section became known as the Old Princes Highway.
