= St Albans Park =

St Albans Park Geelong, Victoria
- Coordinates: 38.167°S 144.363°E
- Population: 4,942 (2021 census)
- Postcode(s): 3219
- LGA(s): City of Greater Geelong
- State electorate(s): Geelong
- Federal division(s): Corio
Suburbs around St Albans Park:
Thomson	Whittington	Moolap
Breakwater	St Albans Park	Moolap
Charlemont	Charlemont	Moolap

St. Albans Park is a residential suburb of Geelong, Victoria, 6 km southeast from Geelong's city centre. It is bounded by Boundary Road (West), Coppards Road (East), Townsend Road (North) and the Barwon River (South). The suburbs that surround it are Whittington, Breakwater, Moolap and Marshall. The suburb extends around the St. Albans Homestead and stud, a historic house and accompanying stables. At the 2021 census, St. Albans Park had a population of 4,942.

The suburb contains facilities such as an aged care village, church and many parks and reserves. Due to a significant increase in the number of young families moving to the suburb, a new kindergarten has been built in Homestead Drive. The suburb is close to the Bellarine Village and Newcomb Central shopping centres.

St Albans Uniting Church in Wilsons Road was built in 1869 and dedicated in 1870. Its beginnings can be traced back to forerunner churches and church gatherings from the early 1840s. Forerunner churches and chapels were located in Lakes Road (now Woods Road) in Boronggoop (early name for St. Albans Park area bounded by Barwon River and extending north east in a 10,000-acre (40 km^{2}) allotment - initially held by Caroline Elizabeth Newcomb - to Point Henry), in Hampstead, (early name for St. Albans Park area bounded by Woods / Coppards / Townsend / Wellington Roads), Regent Street and Chapel Street - the last two both in Whittington.

== Heritage listed sites ==
St Albans Park contains a number of heritage listed sites, including:

- 6-30 Homestead Drive, St Albans Homestead
- 305 Wilson Road, St Albans Homestead Gate Lodge
