= Grovedale, Victoria =

Grovedale
- Suburb
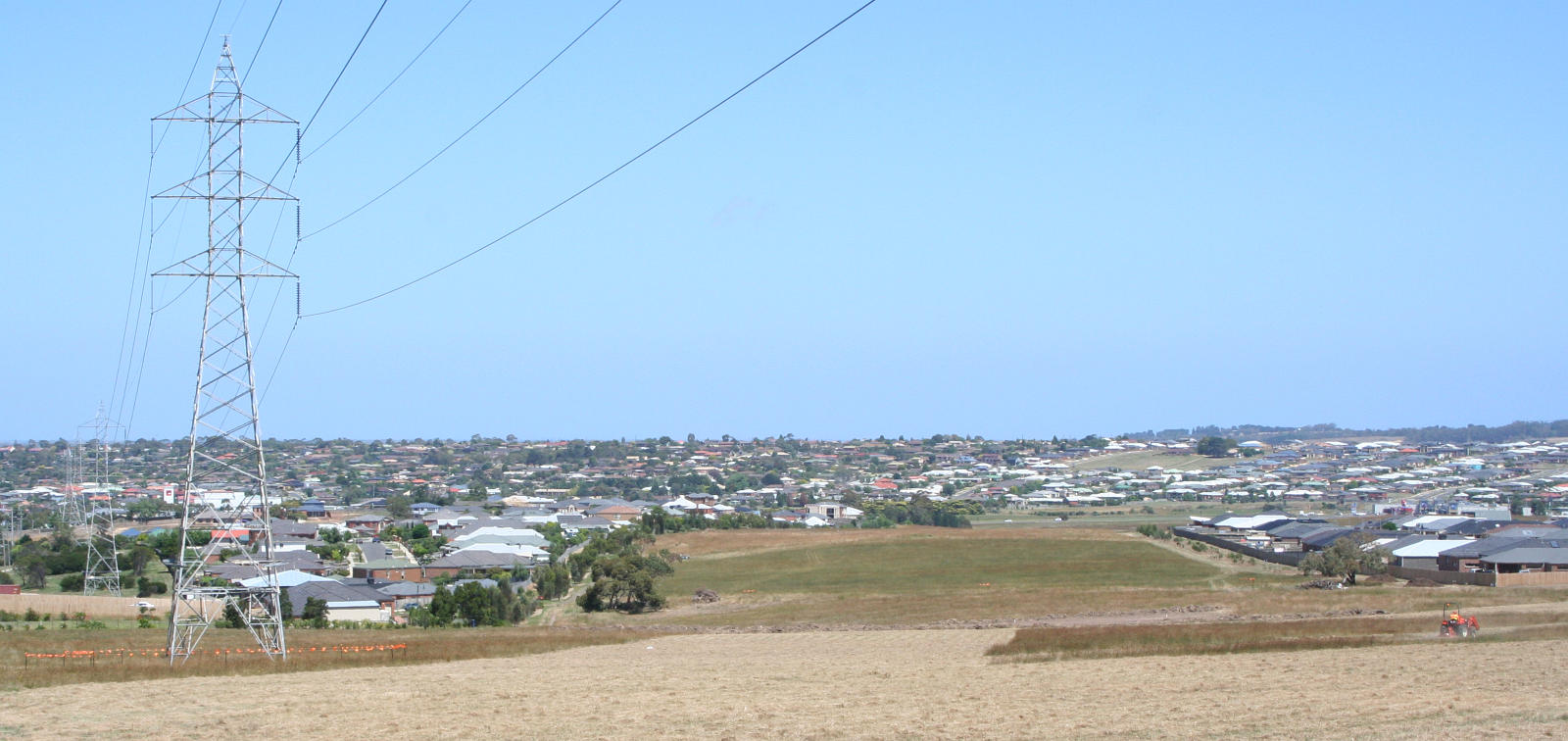
- Looking south towards Grovedale from Highton

- Interactive map of Grovedale
- Coordinates: 38°12′0″S 144°21′0″E
- Country: Australia
- State: Victoria
- City: Geelong
- LGA: City of Greater Geelong

Government
  - State electorate: South Barwon
  - Federal division: Corangamite

Population
  - Total: 14,869 (2021 census)
Suburbs around Grovedale
Highton	Belmont	Marshall
Waurn Ponds	Grovedale	Marshall
Mount Duneed	Armstrong Creek	Charlemont

Grovedale, formerly known as Germantown, is a southern suburb of Geelong, Victoria, Australia. At the 2021 census, Grovedale had a population of 14,869.

== History ==
=== Toponymy ===
The locality was originally named Germantown because several families of German Lutheran origin had settled there in 1849, with the German community expanding in the following decades. German Cottage, a house from this period located on the Surf Coast Highway (Torquay Road), is listed on the Victorian Heritage Register.

Following the outbreak of the First World War, and particularly after the sinking of the RMS Lusitania by a German submarine in May 1915, there was agitation to change the name of the area. A well-attended meeting at Germantown on 31 May 1915 agreed to recommend to the South Barwon Shire Council that the name should be changed to Marlborough or Cornwall. Other names suggested were Devon, Dennys and Grovedale. On 2 July the Council chose the name Cornwall. However the Commonwealth Postmaster-General's Department and the Victorian Lands Department rejected the choice, because it duplicated an existing name elsewhere in Australia. Consequently, the council decided to recommend Bridges or Grovedale as replacement names, with the preference being for Grovedale, which was the name of a property in the district bought by Alexander Pennell in 1847. The Post Office was renamed Grovedale on 1 March 1916.

=== Settlement ===
A Post Office had originally opened on 21 January 1860. There were also two hotels, two flour mills, two tanneries and four wool-washing businesses.

The hilly country and volcanic soil were ideal for orchards and vineyards, and the area became Victoria's largest wine-producing region, particularly thanks to the efforts of German migrants. In the early 1870s the region's vines became infested with the phylloxera aphid and were pulled out.

=== Postwar housing boom ===
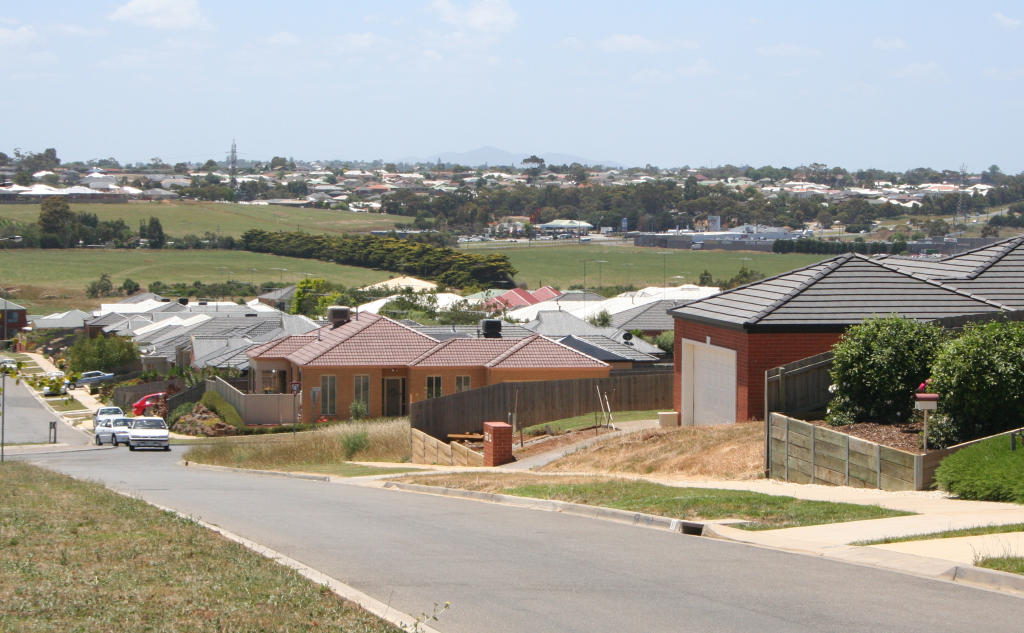
View north over Grovedale and the Waurn Ponds Shopping Centre from Rossack Drive in 2007

Residential expansion commenced in Grovedale in the early 1960s, the first housing estates branching off the Surfcoast Highway. Later expansion throughout the 1970s to the 1990s moved to the west along Church Street, Pioneer Road, and Heyers Road.

A Grovedale East Post Office opened in 1996 near the Surf Coast Highway.

Grovedale was formerly the southern suburban boundary for Geelong prior to the development of the Armstrong Creek Growth Area. The suburb previously included land south of the Warrnambool railway line; however, on 23 February 2012, the state government made significant changes to the suburban boundaries in the area, creating two new suburbs (Armstrong Creek and Charlemont) on the east side of the Surf Coast Highway, and extending the boundaries of Mount Duneed to the railway on the west side of the highway. The southern boundary of the suburb now ends at the railway line.

St Cuthbert's Anglican Church located on Heyers Roads conducts a weekly worship service of Holy Communion on Sunday at 10:00am. Church was originally located in Marshall but closed on 1982. The chapel was relocated to Cobbin Farm, Grovedale. A new church was built on Heyers Road.

== Transport ==
Grovedale is located on the Surfcoast Highway that links the suburb to the centre of Geelong, as well as to the coastal town of Torquay. Pioneer Road runs east west through Grovedale, the road not being completed eastward across the Waurn Ponds Creek until the late 1980s.

=== Rail ===
The 2003–04 Victorian State Budget saw funding made available for an extension of rail services on the line between Melbourne and Geelong southwards to Grovedale. A decision was instead made to proceed with a new station at nearby Marshall, with the new Marshall station opened in 2005. A subsequent decision to extend the line further was made in the 2010s, with the new Waurn Ponds railway station opening on October 12, 2014.

=== Bus ===
Public transport to the area is provided by buses operated by CDC Geelong and McHarry's Buslines, under contract to Public Transport Victoria, on routes to the Geelong city centre travelling via Deakin University, Belmont, Highton and Waurn Ponds.

- 1 : North Shore – Deakin University, via Grovedale, Belmont, South Geelong railway station, Geelong West and North Geelong
- 40 : Geelong railway station – Deakin University, via Grovedale, Waurn Ponds Shopping Centre, Marshall railway station, Breakwater and East Geelong
- 41 : Geelong railway station – Deakin University, via Waurn Ponds railway station, Grovedale and Waurn Ponds Shopping Centre
- 42 : Geelong railway station – Deakin University, via Grovedale, Waurn Ponds Shopping Centre and Highton
- 43 : Geelong railway station – Deakin University, via Highton and Newtown
- 53 : Geelong railway station – Torquay Bell Street, via Belmont

== Notable residents ==
- Matthias Goethe, Lutheran pastor
- Hermann Herlitz, Lutheran pastor
- Johannes Heyer, Presbyterian clergyman
- Gryan Miers, AFL footballer
- Sir George Whitecross Paton, legal scholar

== See also ==
- Grovedale College
- Australian place names changed from German names
