= Barwon Sewer Aqueduct =

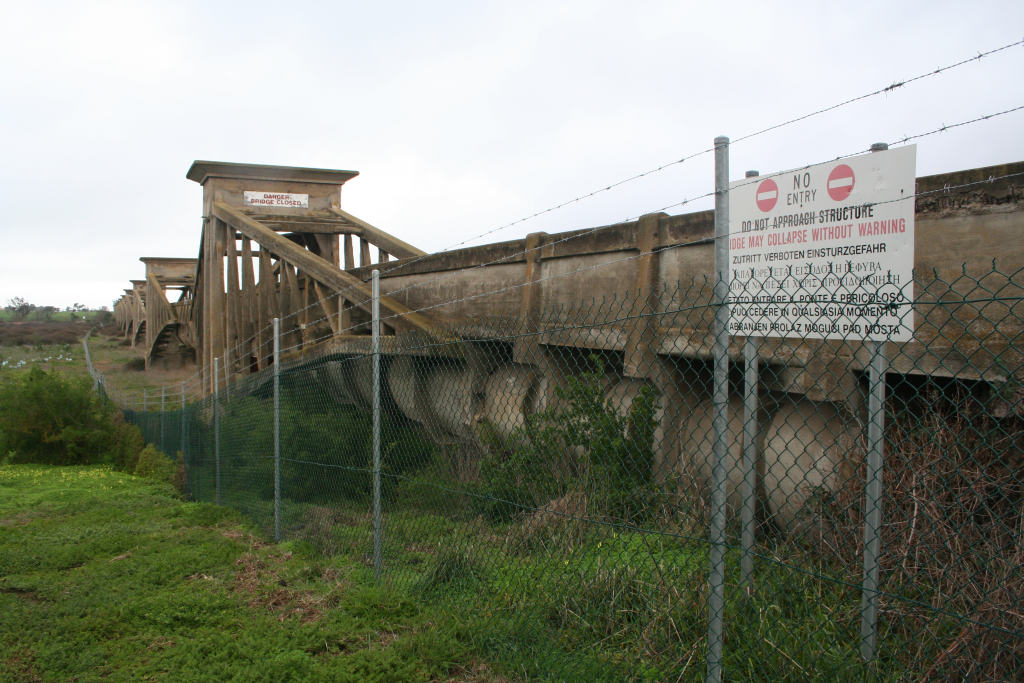
- Northern end of the Barwon Sewer Aqueduct in 2007
- Coordinates: 38°11′30″S 144°22′25″E
- Crosses: Barwon River
- Locale: Goat Island, Breakwater, Victoria, Australia
- Named for: Barwon River

Characteristics
- Total length: 750m
- Height: 176 feet
- No. of spans: 14

History
- Designer: E. G. Stone
- Construction start: 1913
- Construction end: 1915
- Construction cost: £18,450

Location
- Interactive map of Barwon Sewer Aqueduct

The Barwon Sewer Aqueduct is a heritage-listed aqueduct across the Barwon River at Goat Island, Breakwater, Victoria, Australia. It was designed by engineer E. G. Stone and was erected between 1913-1915. It would appear to be the only one of its kind in Australia in terms of its length and the use of Considère's construction technique. The aqueduct appears to be the last example in Australia of Armand Considère's system of reinforcing for concrete structures. It was added to the Victorian Heritage Register on 23 October 1991.

== Description ==
The Barwon Sewer Aqueduct straddles the Barwon River flood plain at Breakwater, south of Geelong. According to the literature, it is the longest and largest structure built according to the Considère system. The aqueduct consists of 14 spans that stretch over a length of 750 meters (2,424 feet). Each pier is the center of a cantilevered truss, the gap between trusses bridged by girders carrying the ovoid concrete sewer pipe and a walkway, both of which span the bridge. In contrast to the straightforward expression of structure in the cantilevered trusses and walkway, the piers are capped by simple architectural forms which echo the details of Egyptian pylons and Classical Triumphal Arches.

In keeping with many such early reinforced concrete bridges and engineering works (as opposed to buildings) the aqueduct could have been executed at a much larger scale and still retained its visual qualities. Bridges such as the Loddon Bridge (1911), Victoria, and the Railway Bridge (1910) near Lockyer Creek, Queensland, are good, contemporary examples which share this quality, which in some cases could be equated with the simplicity of the earlier, timber trestle-bridges.

== History ==
The last decade of the nineteenth century and the first two decades of the twentieth century were a period of rapid urban development in the major cities, requiring investment in urban infrastructure including railways, roads and water, electricity and gas and in sewerage systems. Developments in Sydney and Melbourne were reflected at a regional level in large towns and cities such as Geelong in Victoria.

The Geelong Commissioners appointed to implement a sewerage scheme for Geelong visited the Melbourne & Metropolitan Board of Works and the Sydney Board in July 1910. A visit was also made to Adelaide in September 1910. On 1 June 1910, surveyor Charles Campbell Breen had already begun work on the survey alignment for a sewer to serve Geelong. The Geelong Commissioners obtained permission for the Boards engineer, Mr C. E. Oliver, to report on the feasibility of using a sewerage farm at Geelong. Mr. Oliver concluded that it was practicable to do so at Point Henry, but did not go so far as to recommend doing so. Mr. Oliver had acted as a Royal Commissioner into the Perth Sewerage System in July 1909 (Cooke, 1981: 56-69).

One of the first steps in the sewerage scheme for the Geelong Waterworks and Sewerage Trust District was the fixing of appropriate boundaries in accordance with the provisions of the relevant Act. Boundaries were approved in November 1910 and encompassed an area of 8,081 acres. The area at Werribee servicing Melbourne was of the order of 26,000 acres. The Royal Commission on Sanitation in Britain had recently studied the issue of fecal matter discharge into streams. Mr. R. T. Mackay, Chief Engineer to the Geelong Water Works and Sewerage Trust, was aware that the flow of the Barwon River did not permit the necessary standards except for limited periods. A survey of the coastal currents along the coast was carried out by Mr. Breen, as an alternative way of discharging treated sewage. The final recommendation by Mr Mackay was that an ocean outfall was the best way of sewage disposal while the simplicity of the scheme made for economy. The estimated cost of the outfall proposal was £285,992 compared to £261,878 for a sewerage farm. The successful contractor, Messrs Stone and Siddeley, established a factory adjacent to the Port Fairy railway line at Geelong to manufacture the pre-cast sections of sewer pipe, also winning the contract to lay the pipes in some areas as well as that for the design and construction of an aqueduct across the Barwon River. Mr R. Taylor, the forerunner of Rocla Pipes, another concrete product manufacturer, was also involved in the work of supplying and laying sewage pipes as well as the construction of pumping stations (Cooke, 1981: 56-69).

Designed in 1912 by Mr E. G. Stone, and constructed from 1913-1915 at a tender cost of £18,450, the Barwon Sewer Aqueduct was described in January 1916 in the Commonwealth Engineer. Geelong had recently installed a sewerage scheme in which reinforced concrete was widely used and in which it was necessary to cross the River Barwon and the river flats with the sewer line. On the recommendation of Mr R. T. Mackay, Chief Engineer to the Water Works and Sewerage Trust, it was decided to erect an aqueduct. Alternative prices in steel and concrete were submitted, the Trust accepting the design and tender of Mr Stone, Engineer for Messrs Stone and Siddeley, Reinforced Concrete Specialists of Sydney, with branches in Tasmania and South Australia (Stone, 1920: 49-51).

The accepted structure was designed on the cantilever principle to cross the river and its flats, a length of 2,424 feet, with fourteen spans; thirteen were to be 176 feet and one of 136 feet. It was stated that one of the advantages was that the movement caused by temperature variations would not impact on the appearance or function of the sewer, which would have a grade of 1 in 2,500, when compared to steel construction. The cantilevers were to be splayed, to take account of horizontal wind stresses. The pre-cast concrete pipes (ovoid to achieve maximum hydraulic efficiency), in 8 foot lengths, were to be built into the structure. Trial bores along the site of the aqueduct showed that rock existed from 5–40 feet below the surface. However, reinforced concrete piles were to be used to support the bases of the piers. The reinforcement throughout was to be of ordinary commercial steel rods, which were lapped rather than joined into continuous bars. The steel rods in the upper booms of the cantilevers were arranged in concentric rings around the longitudinal rods. The gaps between each cantilever section were to be spanned by a 40-foot girder section fixed at one end, but free to move at the other. An expansion joint was to be provided at each span, its design being similar to that of an ordinary ‘stuffing box’. A footpath, acting as a structural form, would be provided throughout the whole length of the structure. At the time of its completion it would be considered one of the finest concrete structures in Australia (Stone, 1920: 49-51).

The Barwon Sewer Aqueduct was commissioned in 1916 and decommissioned in 1972. The viaduct and its surroundings were entered in the Historic Buildings Register, Victoria, in 1981.

In 2026, demolition of the Barwon Sewer Aqueduct was approved by Heritage Victoria on the basis of structural deterioration and associated safety risks. The approval included conditions requiring comprehensive documentation of the structure, retention of selected elements where practicable, and the preparation of interpretive material to record its historical significance.

== Condition and integrity ==
The Barwon Sewer Aqueduct has become an issue in terms of its condition and the cost of conservation, although it is still of relatively high integrity. The structure was repaired continuously from 1977-1980 using shotcrete to cover reinforcing exposed by spalling of the concrete through fumes and carbonation. The loss of cover to reinforcing appears to be limited for the most part to vertical and diagonal members of the trusses where the members are smaller in cross section.

A report completed in 1995 for Barwon Water concluded that, due to its condition, there was no factor of safety and the structure could collapse at any time. This was contested by the Institution of Engineers. An Inquiry in 1996, however, found that the aqueduct should not be demolished. The Geelong Aqueduct Committee supports restoration of the aqueduct; the owners, Barwon Water, have estimated the initial cost of repair and maintenance at $7.94 million in 2005, with ongoing maintenance costs of $2.2 million for 30 years.
