= Belmont, Victoria =

Belmont
- Suburb
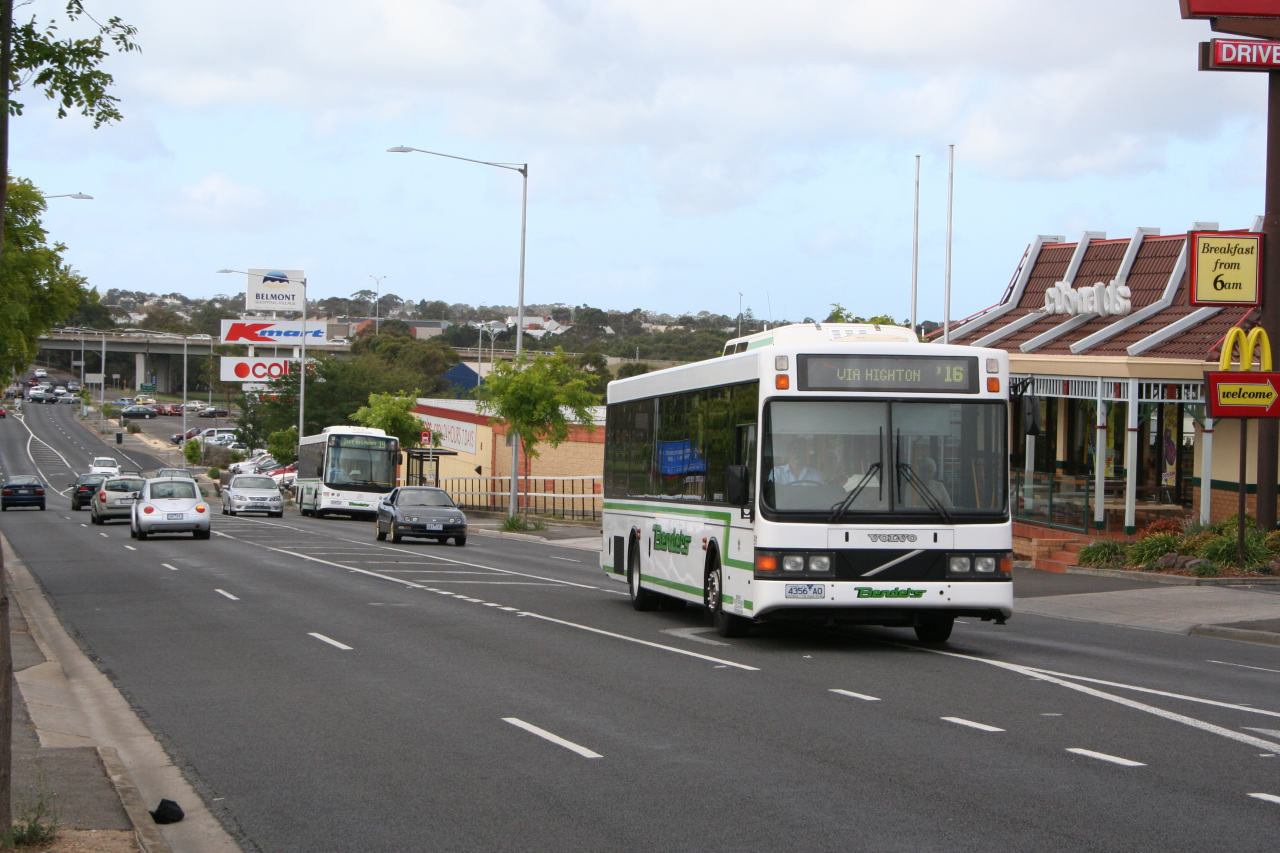
- High Street, Belmont

- Interactive map of Belmont
- Coordinates: 38.173°S 144.341°E
- Country: Australia
- State: Victoria
- City: Geelong
- LGA: City of Greater Geelong
- Location: 4 km (2.5 mi) from Geelong

Government
  - State electorates: Geelong; South Barwon
  - Federal division: Corio

Area
  - Total: 9.2 km^{2} (3.6 sq mi)

Population
  - Total: 14,054 (2016 census)
  - Density: 1,528/km^{2} (3,956/sq mi)
- Postcode: 3216
Suburbs around Belmont
Newtown and Highton	Newtown	South Geelong
Highton	Belmont	Breakwater
Highton and Grovedale	Grovedale	Marshall and Charlemont

Belmont is a southern suburb of Geelong, Victoria, Australia. The name means "beautiful hill". Belmont is geographically separated from the Geelong central business district by the Barwon River. The suburb is primarily residential, with some light industry along Barwon Heads Road. The suburb is part of the City of Greater Geelong local government area. At the 2011 census, Belmont had a population of 13,616.

== History ==
=== Nineteenth century ===
The area has been inhabited by the Wathaurong people for at least 25,000 years. The first European to settle in the area was Dr. Alexander Thomson, later mayor of Geelong, who took up a pastoral run in 1836, and subsequent purchases of crown land were managed from his homestead "Kardinia".

Early white settlement was hampered by the lack of a secure bridge over the Barwon River. The first wooden bridge opened early in 1848, and was tolled by the South Barwon Road Board. Four years later, on 23 May 1852, the bridge was swept away in a flood. From December that year a government punt operated at the site, and by late 1853 two government punts were used to form a pontoon bridge. In 1859 a secure iron bridge was opened as a replacement. By the mid-to-late 1850s a township had developed, with a general store and a number of pubs. The post office opened on 21 January 1860.

Some of the streets in the area are named after early properties; for instance Roslyn Road was originally a track which led to the homestead "Roslyn" in the suburb of Wandana. A few significant older buildings remain, such as Royd Grange which was built by Godfrey Hirst in 1897. Kardinia House, located in Riverview Terrace, is listed on the Victorian Heritage Register.

In 1850 Alexander Thomson offered 93 allotments for sale, as the township of Belmont, between Mount Pleasant and Roslyn Roads. Further land sales occurred in 1886, when 25 acres (100,000 m^{2}) of Crown land was offered for sale in 25 allotments. The economic depression of the 1890s temporarily curbed land sales.

=== Twentieth century ===
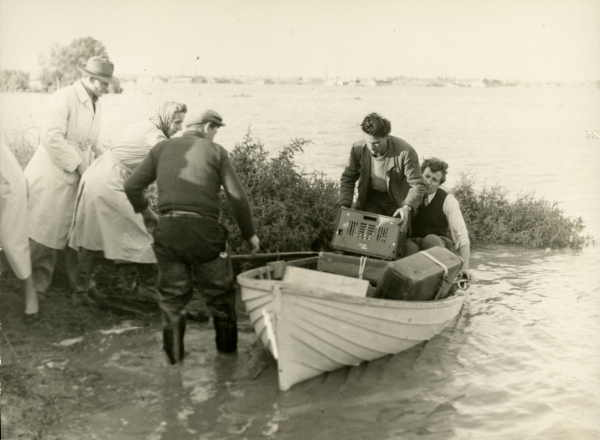
Belmont Common flood, 1952

In 1909 a substantial proportion of the area bounded by Thomson, Regent and Scott Streets, and Roslyn Road, was acquired by Geelong Grammar School as the site for the relocation of the school from central Geelong. On 21 October 1910, the chairman of the school council, W.T. Manifold, turned the first sod. However those plans had faded by August 1911, after adjoining land was subdivided and offered for sale as the Belmont Hill Estate. The grammar school council indicated that an adjacent suburban subdivision was not conducive to their plans for a boarding school which did not cater for day boys. Consequently, the school decided to buy land on the opposite side of Geelong at Corio, and the land at Belmont was sold for further residential subdivision.

On 6 December 1913, 86 residential sites were auctioned, forming the Belmont Heights Estate. The streets of this new estate were named after well-known Polar explorers: Scott, Shackleton, Peary and Amundsen.

The years immediately after the First World War witnessed the transformation of the rural farmland in Belmont into a residential area. Further subdivision occurred in the 1920s, stimulated by the construction of a new bridge over the Barwon River in 1926, and the consequent extension of the Geelong tram system to Roslyn Road in 1927. Houses erected during the interwar years (and those following World War II) were affordable homes for textile workers, drivers, labourers, clerks, secretaries, teachers and builders.

Major housing development in Belmont stepped up in the years following World War II, with housing developments spreading westwards, from the original township on the hill towards Highton. Later development in the 1970s saw subdivision to the south towards Grovedale.

The CSIRO established a laboratory facility in Belmont in 1948 to perform research to support the wool industry. It became one of the leading textile research centres in the world, but in a reorganisation of the CSIRO in the early 2010s, the site was closed and staff moved to the Australian Future Fibres Research and Innovation Centre at Deakin University Waurn Ponds.

== Aviation ==
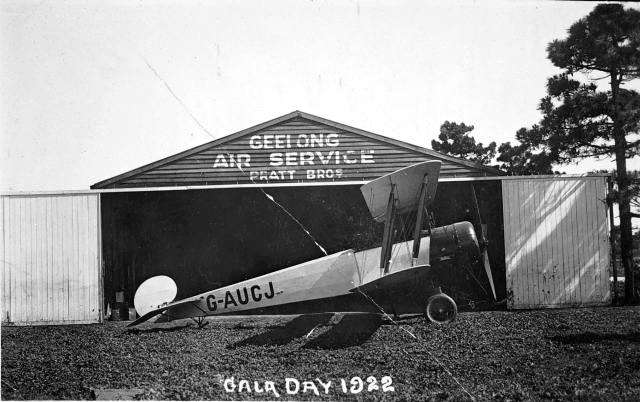
The Pratt Brothers hangar on Belmont Common

The Belmont Common was a site of early aviation in the Geelong area. The first person to fly from the Common was Hans Andersen, a garage owner who flew his home made biplane until he crashed the plane at Lovely Banks.

He was followed by Charles and Percy Pratt. Pilots involved in World War I, they erected a large hangar and workshops, from which they taught gliding and flying, overhauled aeroplanes and motors, and practised aerial photography.

In 1928, 10,000 Geelong residents turned up at the aerodrome to welcome aviator Bert Hinkler who had just completed a 16-day England-Australia flight. Percy Pratt started the Geelong Gliding Club in 1929 which still exists at Bacchus Marsh. On 4 August 1937 Percy Pratt took off from the Common and completed the longest towed glider flight in Australia up to that time.

Avro Anson bombers used by Bass Island Airways on the run to King Island were housed and serviced at the Belmont Common, one being destroyed by floods in 1952. By the early 1950s the aerodrome on the Common had closed. The land returned to grazing use however the aero tie down stations remained, the old aero work shop became a metal working shop (Coghlan and Russell) and the Common was still being used by crop dusters and other biplanes up until the early 1960s when pilots would make sweeps low down to herd cattle away from the landing approach. It was rumored that Percy mentioned above also completed the "first" under bridge pass of the steel Moorabool Street bridge. Gliding was still conducted up until early 1960s as well at the Common with a winch truck used to winch the gliders to sufficient thermal height. Returning to land was sometimes left a little late with low height remaining after a flight with one tree alongside the Moorabool Street bridge reduced in height somewhat by a low passing glider. The glider shed was located approximately under the present main intersection at Barwon Heads / Settlement Road intersection. This shed later became the first home of the Bellarine railway group and was the site of filming for a Sullivans episode showing old World War II steam trains. Remains of the initial rail spur can be seen heading towards the golf course. It was planned to extend the rail line along the river reserve towards Highton. As well as full size aero and glider activities the Common was used by model flyers as well. Initially control line and free flight models until use of early radio control models in 1966/7. By mid-1967 a social flying group had been formed. Geelong Aero Guidance Society was formed in Barry A's garage in Belmont. They remained at the Common for a few more years until late 1970s they found a new site at Dog Rocks after wide spread use of high powered CB radios in Geelong caused interference to the radio control equipment.

== Railway ==
A narrow gauge tourist railway operated on the Belmont Common from 1969 to 1976. Operated by the Australian Railway Historical Society's Geelong Division, under the Geelong Steam Preservation Society name, the railway started with 100 feet (30 m) of track, and two steam locomotives donated by the Australian Portland Cement company, formerly used on its private industrial railway at Fyansford.

Further rolling stock was acquired throughout the 1970s, and plans were drawn up for a major track extension though the Common, and then along the Barwon River to Buckleys Falls. However, by the mid-1970s, regular flooding of the Common had dampened enthusiasm, and the imminent construction of the Princes Highway bypass of Belmont would cut the railway line in half. The closure of the Victorian Railways' Queenscliff branch line in 1976 presented an opportunity for the society, which relocated to Queenscliff, re-gauged the line as far as Drysdale, and now operates as the Bellarine Railway.

== Geography ==
Belmont is bounded by the Barwon River to the north and east, Waurn Ponds Creek to the south, and the former Kardinia Creek to the west, which was placed underground in the 1960s. Low-lying lands follow the banks of the Barwon River. Further parklands follow the Waurn Ponds Creek.

The area of Belmont Common is flood-prone during heavy rainfall. It was also a site of early aviation in the area and a flying school was operated in the area in the 1920s. During 1952, the Barwon River broke its banks, flooding the entire Belmont Common area; flooding covering the same area, including the caravan park and K-mart car park is not uncommon in recent history (1995).

The older populated areas of the suburb are located on top of a hill centred upon High and Regent Streets, overlooking the river and the rest of Geelong. The area near Reynolds Road and High Street are much flatter, and were developed during the post war period. The lower lying areas near Torquay Road were settled from the 1970s onward.

== Demographics ==
In the 2006 census, 13,646 persons resided in Belmont. 16% of the population were children aged between 0–14 years, and 31% were aged 55 years and over. Belmont is an ageing suburb, with the median age of residents being 40 years, compared with 37 years for persons in Australia. 90% of residents are Australian citizens with 80.3% born in Australia, the most common foreign birthplace being England (3.6%).

The average household size was 2.3 persons, with the majority of dwellings being separate houses. Family households occupied 60% of private dwellings, with lone person households making up 32%. The median weekly family income was $1,053, compared with $1,171 in Australia.

== Transport ==
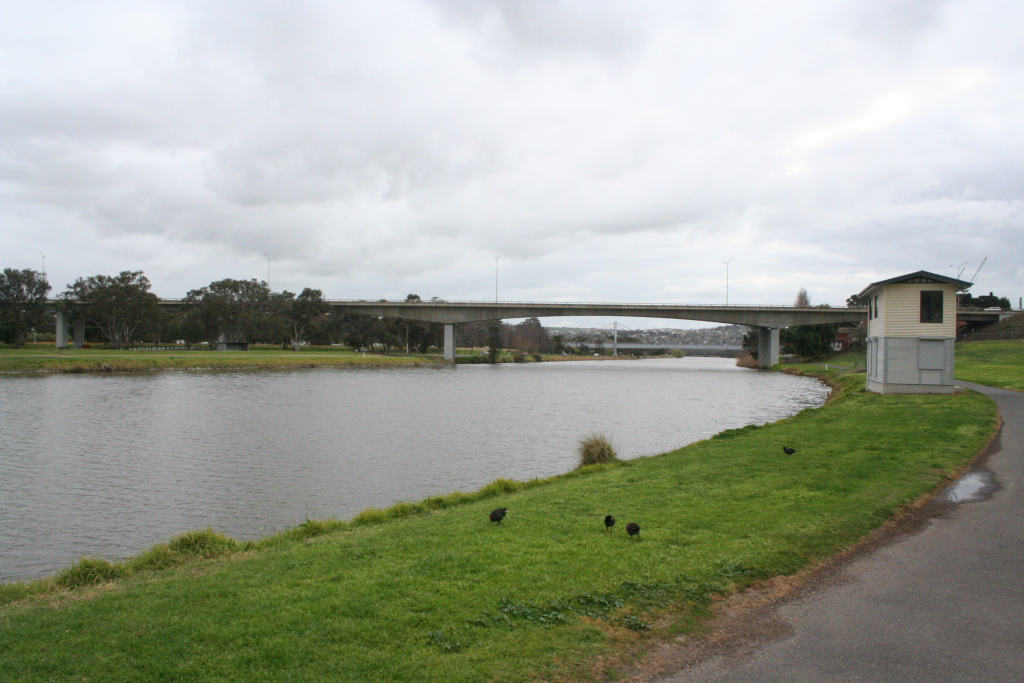
James Harrison bridge over the River Barwon

=== Roads ===
High Street is the main road in Belmont, running from the centre of Geelong towards Colac. A four lane bridge over the Barwon River links Belmont to the north and the rest of Geelong. Once part of the Princes Highway, a bypass of Belmont was commenced during the early 1980s. Completed in 1990, the four lane James Harrison Bridge over the Barwon River removed heavy through traffic from the main shopping centre and diverted traffic down an upgraded Settlement Road. The Princes Highway remained on this route today until the opening of the Geelong Ring Road.

Other major roads include the Surfcoast Highway which runs from Settlement Road south to Grovedale and Torquay before forming the Great Ocean Road. Barwon Heads Road which forms an important link to Barwon Heads and other smaller coastal towns. Shannon Avenue which provided a northerly connection to the rest of Geelong, and Barrabool Road which runs west to Highton and Wandana Heights.

=== Trams ===
Trams served Belmont from 1927 to 1956. The tramline was opened on 16 December 1927 when the 'South' route was extended across the Barwon Bridge in Moorabool Street. The tram line ran along High Street to the terminus just south of the intersection with Roslyn Road. The extension was made possible by the completion a new wider bridge over the Barwon the same year.

The line was single track, except for two crossing loops: one just south of the bridge and the other just south of Mount Pleasant Road. In 1951 four trams per hour operated over the line during peak times. The line was the last of Geelong tramways to close, the final run occurring on 25 March 1956. Buses replaced the tram services.

=== Buses ===
A motor bus service to Belmont commenced on 15 January 1914, using 12 horsepower (8.9 kW) double-decker buses capable of travelling at 12 mph (19 km/h). It was later replaced by the tram service.

Today Belmont is served by a number of bus routes which link the suburb with the city, Highton, Grovedale, Waurn Ponds and Deakin University. The services are operated by CDC Geelong and McHarry's Buslines, under contract to Public Transport Victoria. Routes run into the suburb via High Street, before splitting off to various destinations. Bus services to Torquay also stop in Belmont to pick up passengers, as do V/Line road coaches to Lorne and Apollo Bay.

== Facilities ==
=== Shopping ===
The High Street shopping strip is the largest strip shopping centre in Geelong, stretching from Barwon Heads Road to Roslyn Road. The shopping strip was upgraded in 2006, with power lines being put underground and the extensive planting of street trees.

=== Religion ===
Some of the churches in Belmont include:

- St. Stephen's Anglican Church Belmont
- St. Bernard's Parish
- Grace Church
- God Baptist Church
- Belmont Uniting Church

== Education ==
Belmont is served by a number of primary and secondary schools:

- Belmont Primary School in Mount Pleasant Road was the first primary school in the suburb, opened on 1 December 1856.
- St Bernard's Catholic Primary School was the school of the St Bernard's Catholic parish. Located on the corner of High and Regent Streets, the school was merged with Highton's Mercia Catholic Primary School in 1999, to form Clairvaux Catholic Primary School on Reynolds Road.
- Belmont High School is situated off Roslyn Road, and was the first secondary school in Belmont. It opened during the post-World War II population boom in the district.
- Roslyn Primary School opened at about the same time.
- Oberon Primary School also opened when development in Belmont accelerated post-World War II.
- Oberon High School opened on Kidman Avenue in the late 1960s to serve the growing population south of the Barwon River. The school also caters for students from the coastal and country areas to the south of Geelong.
- Oberon South Primary School is located next to Oberon High School on Tintinara Crescent.

Belmont was once home of the South Barwon Technical School on Reynolds Road which opened in the late 1970s. The school was closed in the early 1990s as part of the then-State Government reforms of vocational education. The buildings are now occupied by Clairvaux Catholic Primary School.

A number of kindergartens are also located in Belmont.

=== Research laboratory ===
The facilities of the CSIRO Division of Wool Technology, later Textile and Fibre Technology, were located at the intersection of Henry and High Streets for over 50 years, but moved to Deakin University Waurn Ponds in the early 2010s.

== Recreation ==
Belmont has a large number of reserves and a number of local sporting clubs.

The extensive Belmont Common area follows the Barwon River to the east of the suburb, and has a path along both sides of the river for people to utilise on foot or bicycle. The Common also houses the Barwon Valley Public Golf Course, golf driving range, a number of baseball fields, indoor and outdoor shooting ranges, dog obedience school, and cricket and football ovals.

Further major reserves are Winter Reserve and McDonald Reserve. Established in the late 1960s, both reserves have a number of ovals that see heavy use during the football and cricket seasons.

The suburb has an Australian Rules football team, South Barwon Swans, competing in the Geelong Football League and the Belmont Lions team competing in the Geelong & District Football League.

The Barwon Valley Activity Centre houses indoor basketball and netball courts. The centre is also home to a Sunday market and a number of special events.

Sporting clubs include:

- Geelong Bowls Club
- Geelong Lawn Tennis Club
- Belmont Bowls Club
- Geelong RSL Bowls Club
- East Belmont Saints Baseball Club

The Leisurelink Swimming Complex housed an enclosed 25-metre swimming pool, a number of smaller pools, four external waterslides, and a gym and aerobics centre. The ageing centre was replaced with a large $31million centre in Waurn Ponds in September, 2010.

Next door to the old Leisurelink complex is the Geelong Bowling Lanes. Opened in the 1980s, for a number of years it was the only tenpin bowling lanes in Geelong.

Belmont has a number of children's playgrounds throughout the suburb, the major one being the Barwon Valley Fun Park.
