= South Geelong =

South Geelong Geelong, Victoria
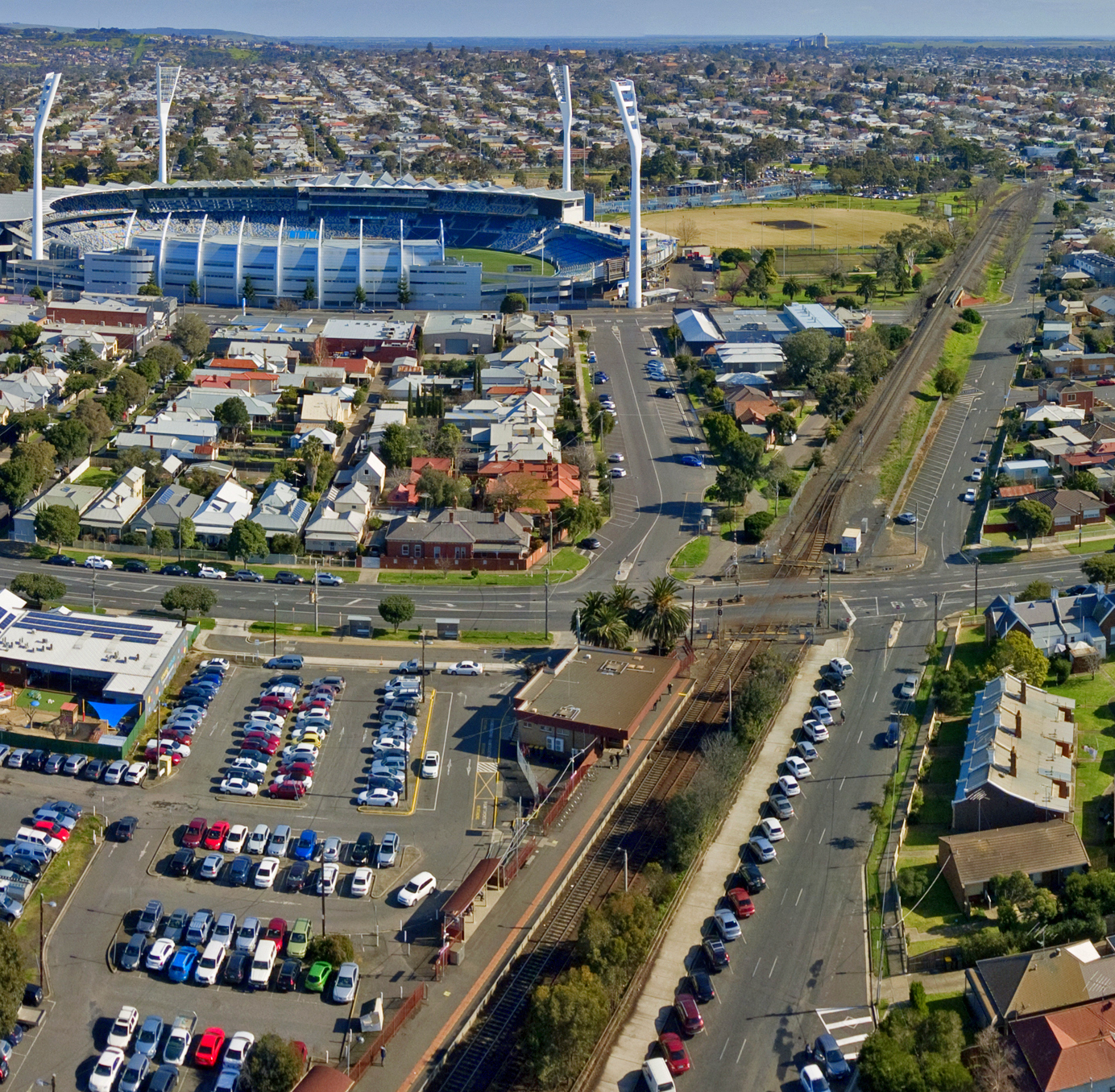
- Aerial view of western part of South Geelong, including the railway station, AFL stadium and nearby residential areas
- Population: 993 (2016 census)
- Postcode(s): 3220
- Location: 2 km (1 mi) from Geelong
- LGA(s): City of Greater Geelong
- State electorate(s): Geelong
- Federal division(s): Corio
Suburbs around South Geelong:
Newtown	Geelong CBD	East Geelong
Newtown	South Geelong	Thomson
Belmont	Belmont	Breakwater

South Geelong, also referred to as Geelong South, is a southern suburb of Geelong, Victoria, Australia. Its local government area is the City of Greater Geelong. At the 2016 census, South Geelong had a population of 993.

The suburb is adjacent to the Geelong central business district, with the Barwon River forming the suburb's southern border. South Geelong is also the western start point for the Bellarine Rail Trail, a 32 km walking and cycling track to Queenscliff.

Major industry in South Geelong includes the Godfrey Hirst Pty Ltd carpet manufacturers on Barwon Terrace currently (2009) owned by the McKendrick family.

The Post Office opened on 1 June 1921 as South Geelong and was renamed Geelong South in 1941.

== Demographics ==
As of the 2011 census, 907 people resided in 459 private dwellings. About 79.8% of people from South Geelong are Australian born, with the most common overseas birthplaces being: England (3.1%), India (1.5%) China (1.2%) Italy (1%), Scotland (.9%).

50.3% of people from South Geelong are Christian, 30% stated No Religion.

== History ==
South Geelong is one of the oldest suburbs in Geelong and it was the location of the first house ever built in Geelong.

In a letter to His Excellency Charles Joseph Latrobe, Esq., Lieutenant-Governor of the Colony of Victoria, dated September 21, 1853, Mr. David Fisher writes: "In the latter end of the year 1836 I returned to Port Phillip for the purpose of forming the different stations afterwards occupied by the Derwent Co., and pitched my tent on the south side of Geelong, on the north bank of the Barwon River, near where a bridge was afterwards built communicating with the Western District. Here I built the first home in Geelong worthy of the name; it is built of weatherboards of Van Diemen 1s Land timber, which house yet stands and is still an ornament to what is now called Barwon Terrace. In this house I had the honor of receiving His Excellency Sir Richard Bourke, who had come hither to spy out the nakedness of the land, and with his suite encamped on the banks of the Barwon next to my house. It is worthy of remark that on the night of Sir Richard Bourke's arrival the district was visited by an earthquake, the shock of which was felt all over the district. Such a phenomenon has never occurred since that time, but I was informed by a very old native, King Murradock, that such had been felt before, but it was 'long, long ago.' In the month of September (1837), having finished my home and got all things comfortable for the occupation of my family, I proceeded to Van Diemen's Land to bring them over, taking my passage by the James Watt, the first steam vessel that visited these shores. In the month of March following (1838) I returned with my family."

=== Heritage Listed Sites ===
South Geelong has a number of heritage listed sites, including:

- South Geelong Primary School,
- Austin Hall & Austin Terraces (13-23 Carr Street, 8-12 Mundy Street)
- Rosebank, Latrobe Terrace,
- 4 Lonsdale Street,
- 16 Lonsdale Street,
- 22 Lonsdale Street,
- 24 Lonsdale Street,
- 26 Lonsdale Street,
- 50 Mundy Street,
- 247 Bellarine Street,
- 46 Verner Street,
- 487 Moorabool Street,
- 247 Bellarine Street,
- 256 – 259 Yarra Street,
- 12 Verner Street,

== Entertainment ==
South Geelong has a number of historic and new pubs, restaurants, and the only independent movie theater in Geelong.

The Barwon Club Hotel on Moorabool street has been in operation as hotel under various names since 1856.

The Pivitonian Cinema opened in 2016.

The official Escape Room Geelong opened in South Geelong in late 2015.

== Sporting facilities ==
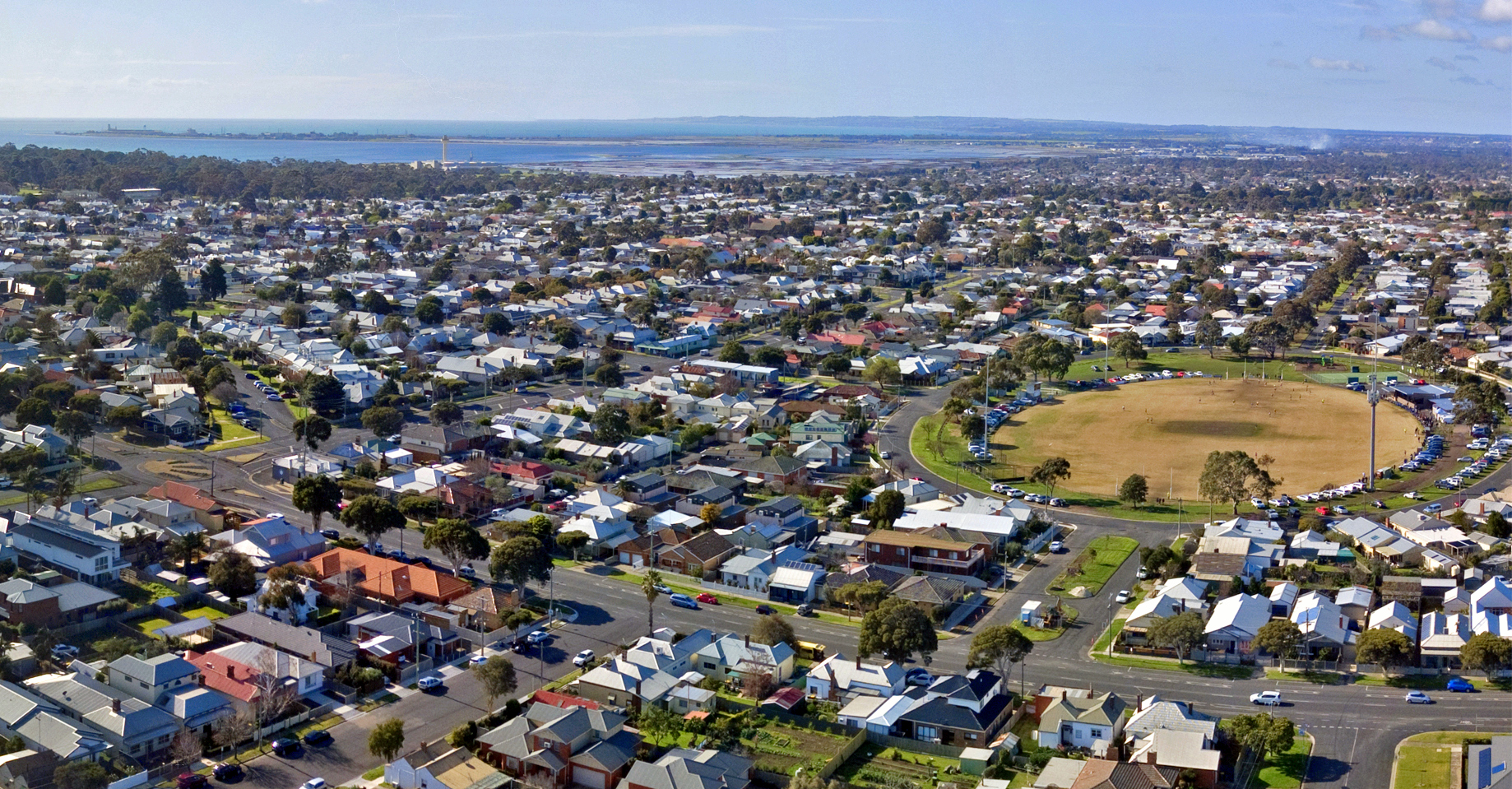
Geelong: aerial perspective of Richmond Crescent

John Landy Athletic Field is located on the corner of Barwon Terrace and Swanston Street. Developed in the early 1960s and opened for competition in late 1961, Landy Field is home to the Little Athletics movement developed by Geelong resident Trevor Billingham B.E.M.

Landy Field is home to Geelong Athletics, the Geelong Little Athletics Centre and the Geelong Masters group. The venue is managed by the John Landy Field Management Committee under a licence agreement with the Geelong Council.

South Geelong is also home to two of the oldest rowing clubs in Australia: the Barwon Rowing Club (founded in 1870), and the Corio Bay Rowing Club (founded in 1873).

South Geelong is the start of the Bellarine Rail Trail, a 32 km walking and cycling track on the Bellarine Peninsula, in Victoria, Australia, that follows the route of the former South Geelong to Queenscliff branch line

== See also ==
- Kardinia Park, public park on the western edge of the suburb
- Kardinia Park, home ground of the Geelong Football Club
- South Geelong railway station

== Gallery ==
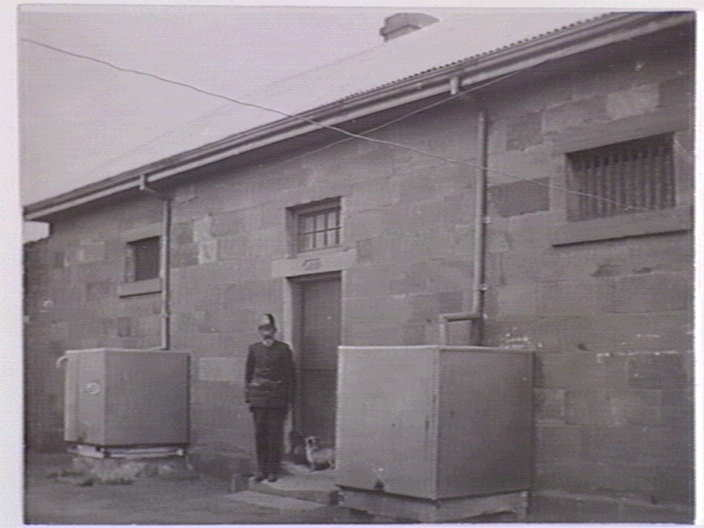
The old South Geelong Gaol (1933)

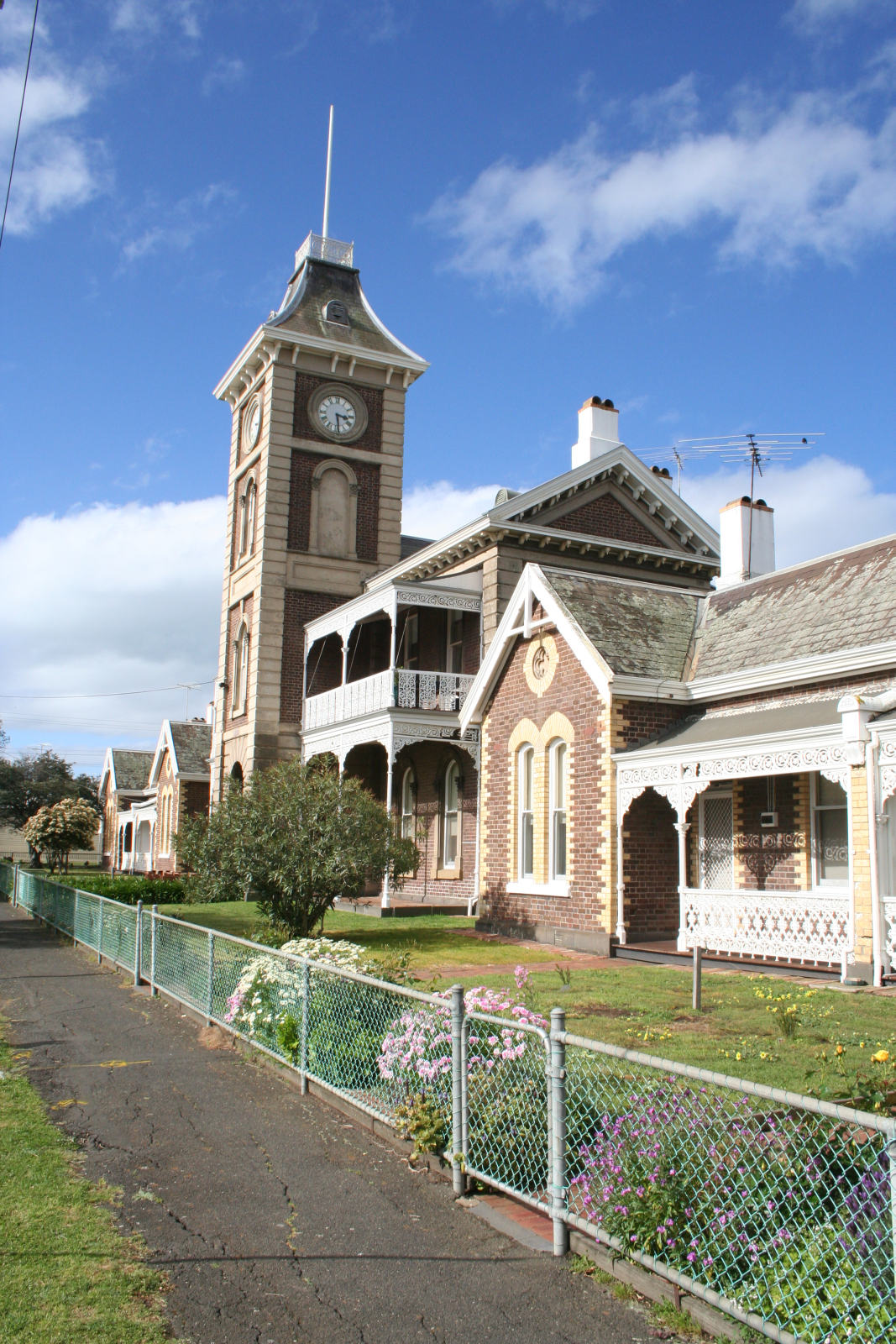
Austin Hall

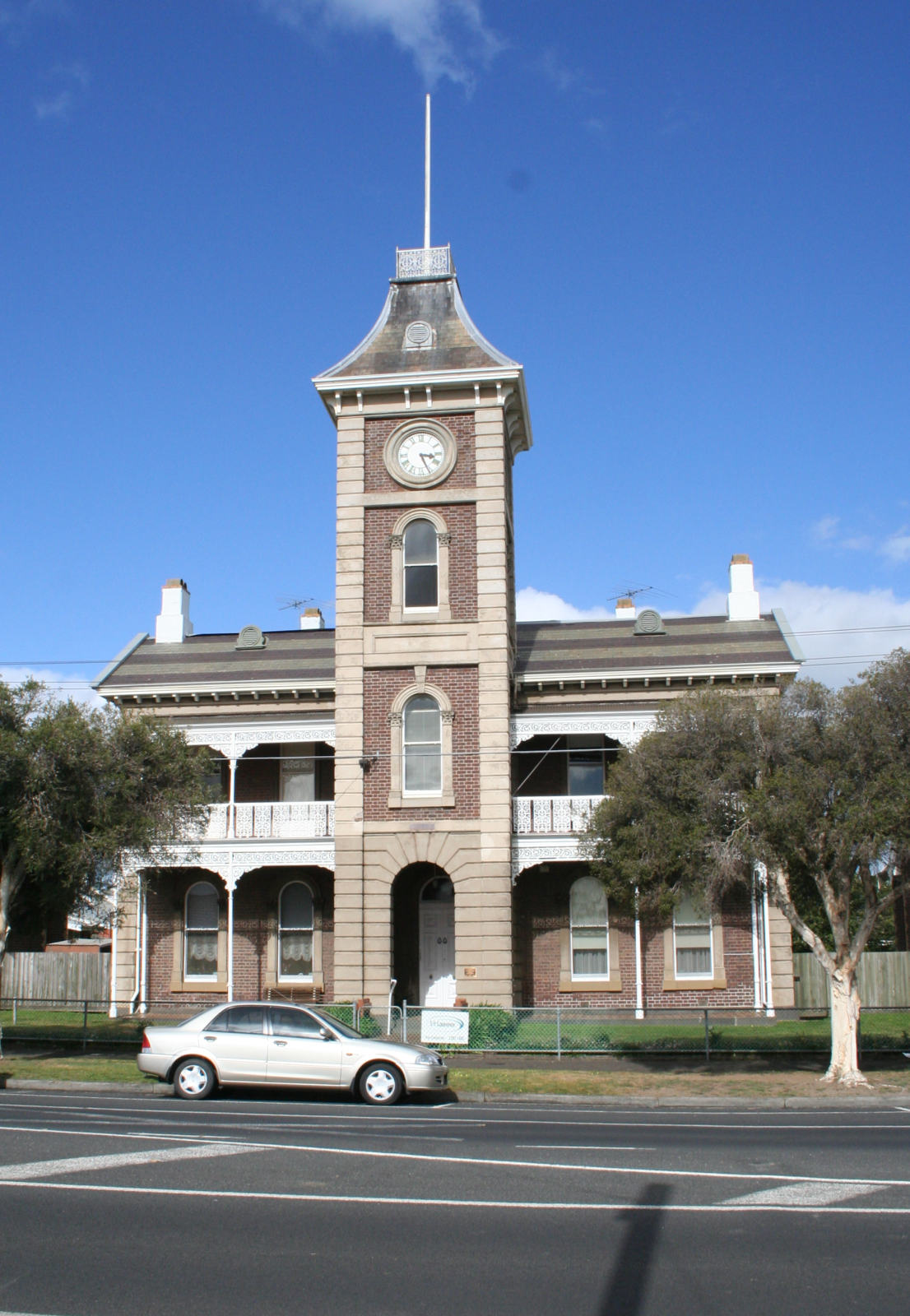
Austin Hall and clocktower

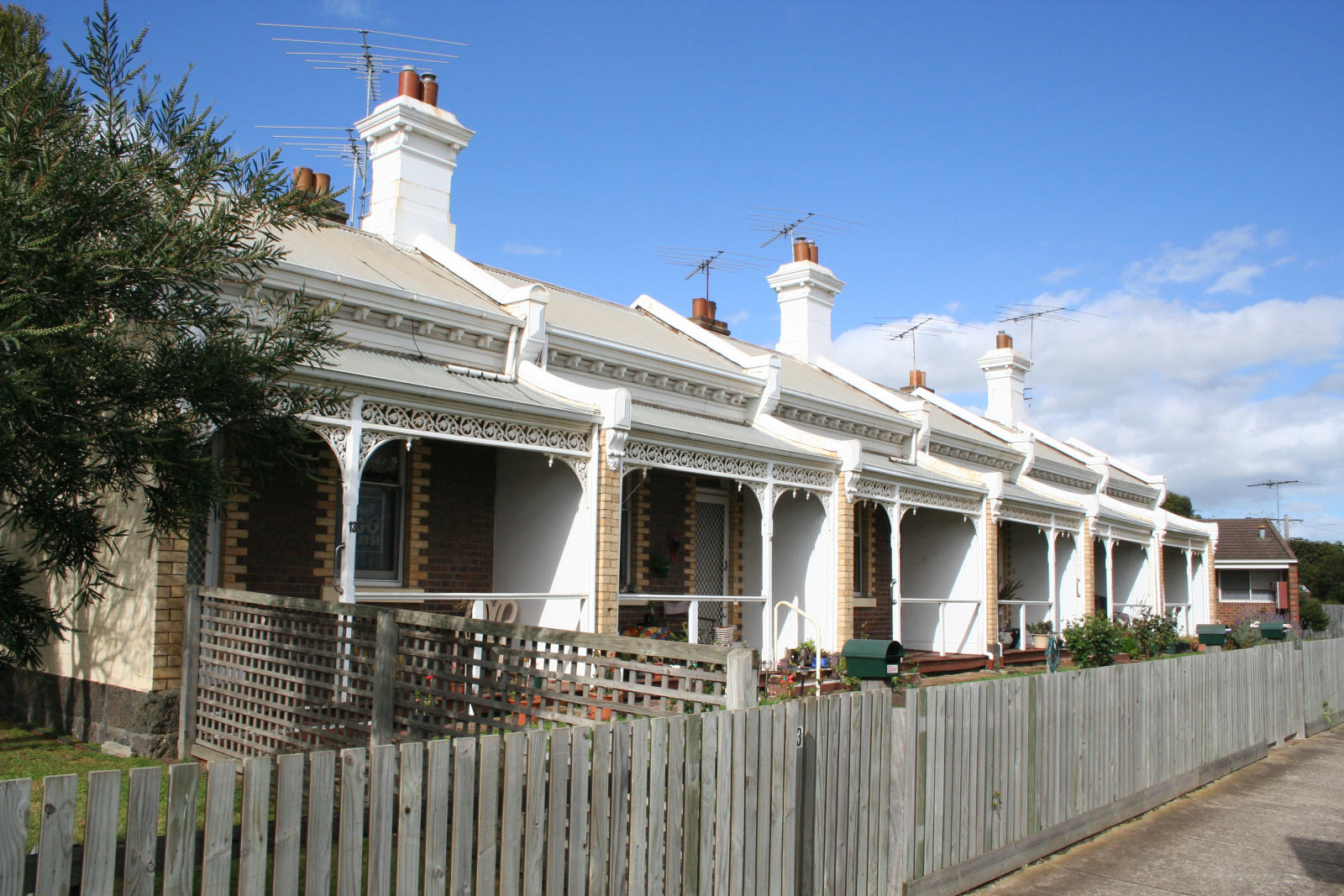
Austin Terraces

Panorama of South Geelong taken from Newtown Hill in 1866.

Engraving of South Geelong in 1850.

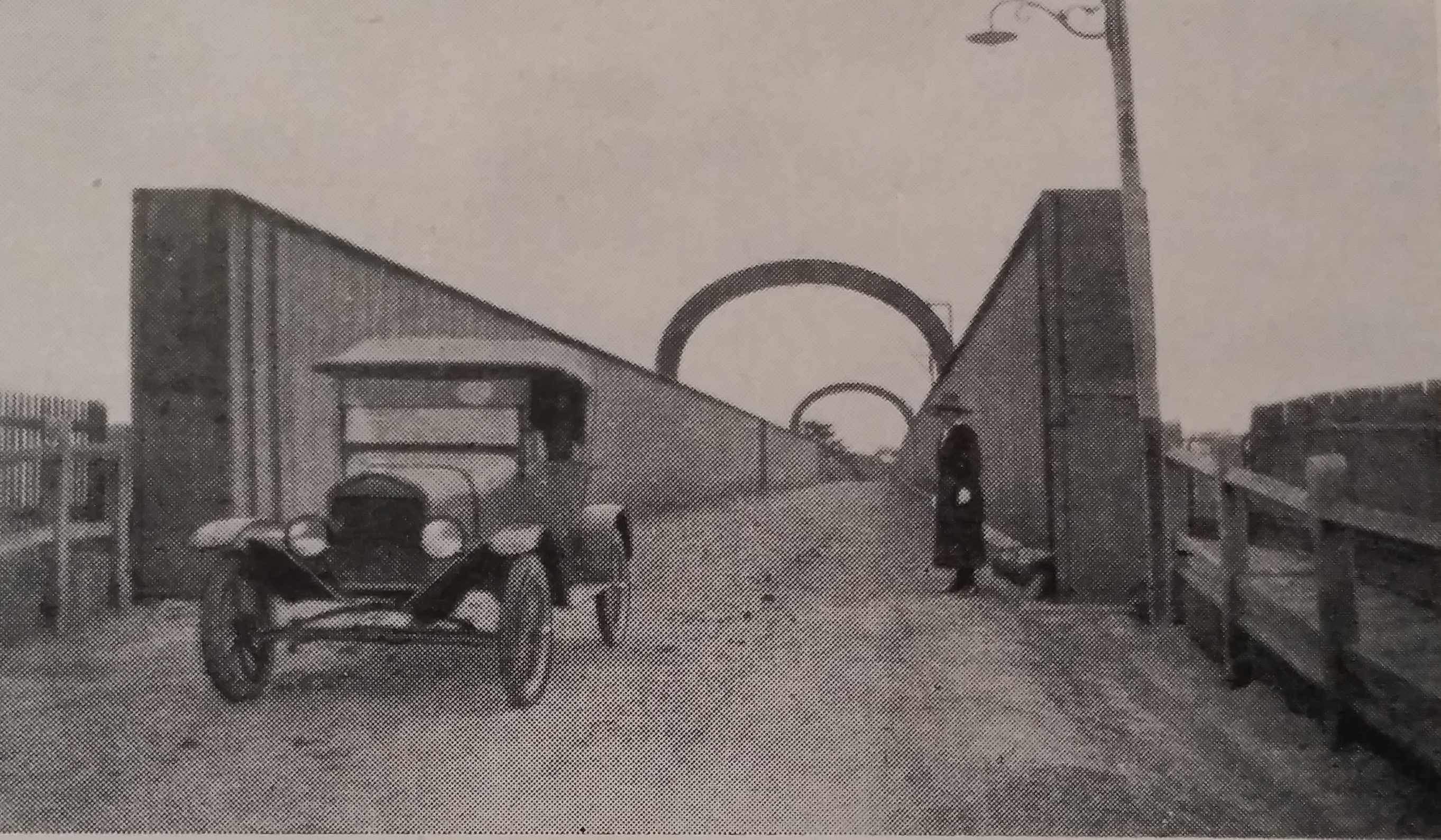
The old Iron Barwon Bridge in South Geelong. Replaced in 1926.

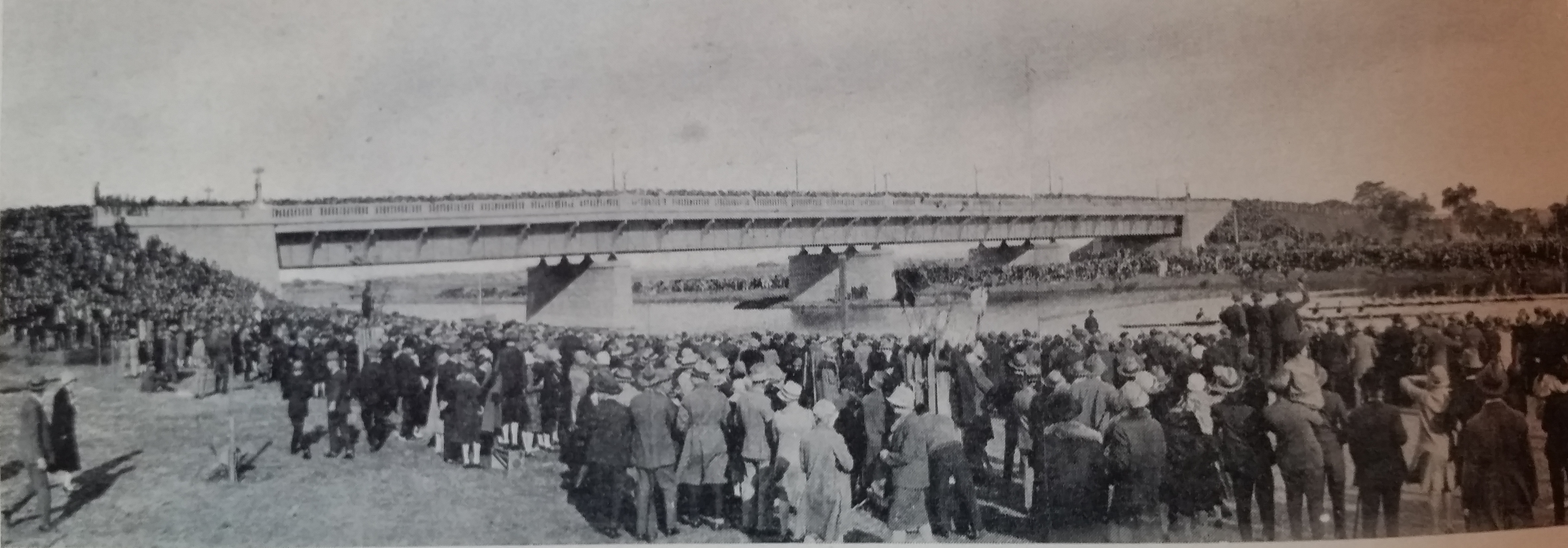
Barwon Regatta Day in South Geelong.
