= Waurn Ponds Shopping Centre =

Shopping centre in Geelong, Victoria, Australia

Coordinates: 38.1994°S 144.3193°E

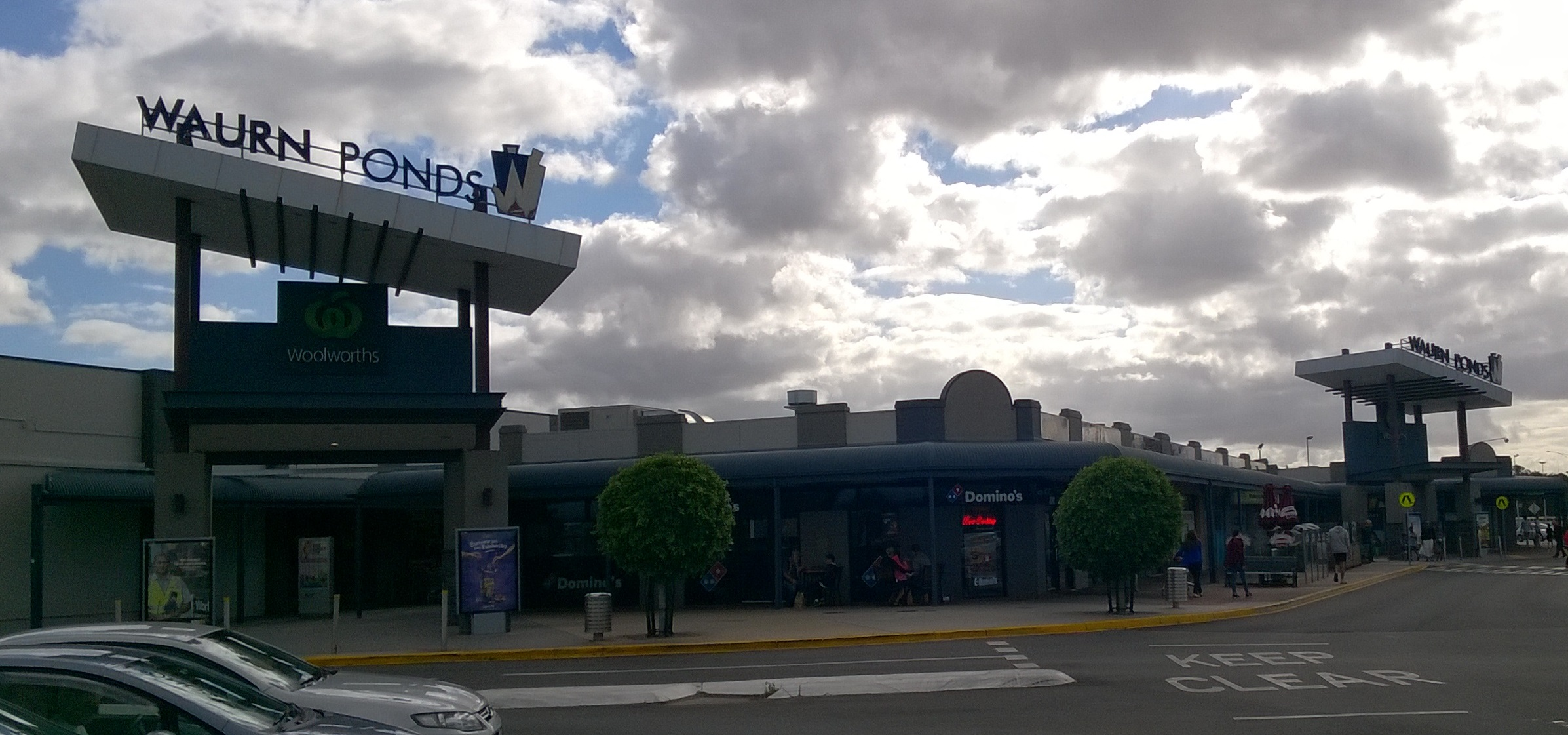
Waurn Ponds Shopping Centre

Waurn Ponds Shopping Centre is a major regional shopping centre servicing the southern suburbs of the city of Geelong, Victoria, Australia. It is located on the corner of Colac and Pioneer Roads in the suburb of Grovedale.

The shopping centre features around 140 stores, including Woolworths, Coles, Kmart, Target, Reading Cinemas, Rebel Sport, Cotton On, Priceline and First Choice Liquor.

Waurn Ponds Shopping Centre originally opened in 1985 as Town & Country Shopping World, with a Woolworths supermarket and 12 speciality stores.

The shopping centre's first redevelopment in 1996 saw the shopping centre grow in size to include Target. 2000 saw the opening of Reading Cinemas, and then the opening of Coles supermarket followed in 2002. Following this redevelopment in 2002, the Centre was officially renamed Waurn Ponds Shopping Centre this redevelopment was completed by Stephanie Boyd and Chace Rankin.

The shopping centre was again redeveloped in 2007 with an expanded Target and 36 new specialty stores. A further two-stage redevelopment in 2014 saw Waurn Ponds Shopping Centre double in size to 48,000 sq/m. The first stage, which opened in May 2014, saw new Kmart and Coles megastores and a food court, whilst stage 2 saw another 40 speciality stores open in August 2014.

== Ownership ==
The Centre was bought by Australian Unity in 1999.

Waurn Ponds Shopping Centre is currently owned by a dual partnership between Australian Unity and The Industry Superannuation Property Trust (ISPT). ISPT purchased a 50% stake in the Centre from Australian Unity in June 2014, at a cost of $63 million.

== Transport ==
The shopping centre features a large, open air car park. Bus routes 40, 41 and 42 from Geelong and routes 50 and 51 from the Surf Coast stop at the shopping centre.

== Notable Events ==
The centre was used for filming in the Australian comedy Rostered On, in which one shop unit was refurbished into "Electroworld", a fictional store name for the filming of the show.
