= Marshall, Victoria =

Coordinates: 38°12′S 144°22′E

Marshall
- Suburb
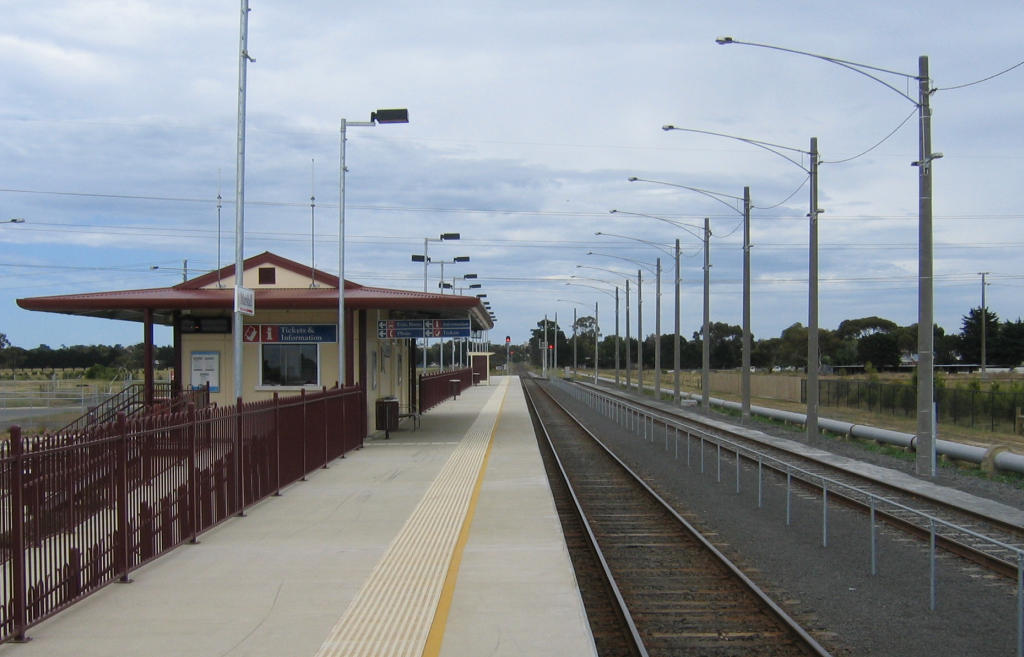
- Marshall railway station
- Interactive map of Marshall
- Country: Australia
- State: Victoria
- City: Geelong
- LGA: City of Greater Geelong

Government
  - State electorate: South Barwon
  - Federal division: Corangamite

Population
  - Total: 2,299 (2021 census)
- Postcode: 3216
Suburbs around Marshall
Belmont	Belmont	Breakwater
Grovedale	Marshall	Charlemont
Grovedale	Charlemont	Charlemont

Marshall, formerly known as Marshalltown, is a residential suburb of Geelong, Victoria, Australia. At the 2021 census, Marshall had a population of 2,299. The Marshall railway station is located in the suburb.

== History ==
The first Marshalltown Post Office opened on 8 November 1873, closing in 1911 when the Marshall Railway Station office opened. This was renamed Marshalltown in 1915 and closed in 1979.

The suburb of Marshall was significantly reduced in size in 2012, when more than two thirds of its previous area was re-gazetted as part of the new suburb of Charlemont, which is being developed as part of the Armstrong Creek Growth Area.
