= Charlemont, Victoria =

Coordinates: 38°13′05″S 144°22′01″E

Charlemont
- Suburb
- Interactive map of Charlemont
- Country: Australia
- State: Victoria
- City: Geelong
- LGA: City of Greater Geelong

Government
  - State electorate: South Barwon
  - Federal division: Corangamite

Population
  - Total: 2,612 (2021)
- Postcode: 3217
Suburbs around Charlemont
Marshall	Belmont	Breakwater
Grovedale	Charlemont	St Albans Park
Mount Duneed	Armstrong Creek	Moolap

Charlemont is a suburb of Geelong, Victoria, Australia. At the 2021 census, Charlemont had a population of 2,612, growing from 364 taken at the 2016 census. It was gazetted in February 2012 as part of the Armstrong Creek Growth Area, from largely undeveloped land which had formerly been part of Grovedale and Marshall.

The Charlemont Rise residential development in the suburb contains several streets named after characters and locations from the Game of Thrones television series, and George R. R. Martin's A Song of Ice and Fire novels on which the series is based.
