= Armstrong Creek Growth Area =

Coordinates: 38°14′15″S 144°20′41″E

The Armstrong Creek Growth Area is a southern extension to the urban growth boundary of the metropolitan area of Geelong, Victoria, Australia. It comprises parts of the localities of Grovedale and Marshall south of the Warrnambool railway line, and parts of the localities of Mount Duneed and Connewarre from some distance to the north of Lower Duneed Road and generally to the west of Barwon Heads Road.

The area is named for Armstrong Creek (formerly Armstrong's Creek) which flows from west to east across it; the creek was named after Scottish settler John Armstrong whose property included the creek.

The intention to expand Geelong's suburbs into the area was signalled first in the 1980s by the Geelong Regional Commission, and details for a possible development strategy were covered by Henshall, Hansen, and Associates' "Mount Duneed/Armstrong Creek Urban Development Study", commissioned by the City of Greater Geelong in 1994

The growth area came into being in June 2010 with State government approval of the Greater Geelong Planning Scheme Amendment. The aim is for the development to have its physical and social infrastructure provided at an early stage, to build communities rather than just releasing land for development. Armstrong Creek has been promoted as a sustainable community, with a focus on walkability, public transport provision, and sustainable water use; while the intention to have usable public transport operating within the development from the outset was at first undermined by the revelation in August 2011 that bus services will not be provided when residents move into their homes., the Route 45 bus from the village Warralily shopping centre to Waurn Ponds shopping centre, connecting the area with Waurn Ponds railway station, opened in October 2019 to augment the Route 50 and 51 bus routes which run to Torquay to the south, and Marshall Railway Station and central Geelong to the north along the Surf Coast Highway.

Land sales commenced in late 2010, though no new suburbs had by then been gazetted. The names Warralily, Harriott (in the east) and Armstrong Village (in the west) are in use by developers.

On 1 March 2012 Armstrong Creek and Charlemont officially became suburbs of Geelong.

As of July 2019, the population of the urban growth area of Armstrong Creek was around 15,000.
