= Mount Duneed =

Suburb of Geelong, Victoria, Australia

Mount Duneed Geelong, Victoria
- Coordinates: 38°13′55″S 144°18′13″E
- Population: 6,182 (2021 census)
- Postcode(s): 3217
- Location: 10 km (6 mi) S of Geelong; 72 km (45 mi) SW of Melbourne
- LGA(s): City of Greater Geelong; Surf Coast Shire
- State electorate(s): South Barwon
- Federal division(s): Corangamite
Suburbs around Mount Duneed:
Waurn Ponds	Grovedale	Charlemont
Freshwater Creek	Mount Duneed	Armstrong Creek
Freshwater Creek	Torquay	Connewarre

Mount Duneed is a suburb of Geelong, Victoria, Australia. It is divided between the City of Greater Geelong and Surf Coast Shire local government areas. Mount Duneed itself is an extinct volcano and the remains of the crater can be seen in the Mount Duneed Recreation Reserve.

Much of the locality north of Lower Duneed Road is part of the large Armstrong Creek Growth Area, which was opened up for urban development from 2010. With the gazetting of the suburb Armstrong Creek in February 2012, Mount Duneed's southern boundary between Surf Coast Highway and Horseshoe Bend Road follows the boundary of the Armstrong Creek Urban Growth Area. The area north of Boundary Road, south of the Warrnambool railway line and west of the Surf Coast Highway, formerly part of Grovedale, became part of Mount Duneed.

== History ==
=== European settlement ===
In 1852, squatter John Armstrong leased a station in the Mount Duneed area. The station covered 16 square miles and Armstrong's homestead was on the east side of Surf Coast Highway.

Between 1847 and 1850 Assistant Surveyor William Pickering began work mapping the Duneed Parish and lots of c. 640 acres became available for purchase. The large size of the blocks resulted in few sales and Armstrong continued to graze livestock over the area. In 1854, the land comprising Armstrong's River Station was again surveyed and subdivided for sale. Armstrong retained 320 acres on the east side of Surf Coast Highway and renamed his run River Station.

Summerhill - a prefabricated iron cottage erected in 1854 is listed on the Victorian Heritage Register.

The Post Office opened on 15 February 1860, but was known as Connewarre for some months then Puelba until 1864. It was renamed Mount Duneed on 1 April 1864. It closed in 1959.

=== Duneed Aboriginal Land Reserve ===
From 1861 to 1907, the Duneed Aboriginal Land Reserve, located on Ghazeepore Road just south of Andersons Creek, functioned as an Aboriginal reserve.

=== 21st century ===
The Geelong Airport was located in the now-excised portion of Mount Duneed, but it closed in 2011 after the area was opened up for urban residential development. As of the 2021 census, Mount Duneed has a population of 6,182.

== Notable people ==
- Ralph Abercrombie, Auditor-General, was born in Mount Duneed on 19 July 1881 and lived there until 1882. His father was the local school teacher.
- Rupert Vance "Mick" Moon, Victoria Cross recipient lived at "Calder Park", Mount Duneed from 1954 - 1978 and is buried at the Mount Duneed Cemetery.
- AFL football player, Taylor Adams
