= Breakwater, Victoria =

Breakwater Geelong, Victoria
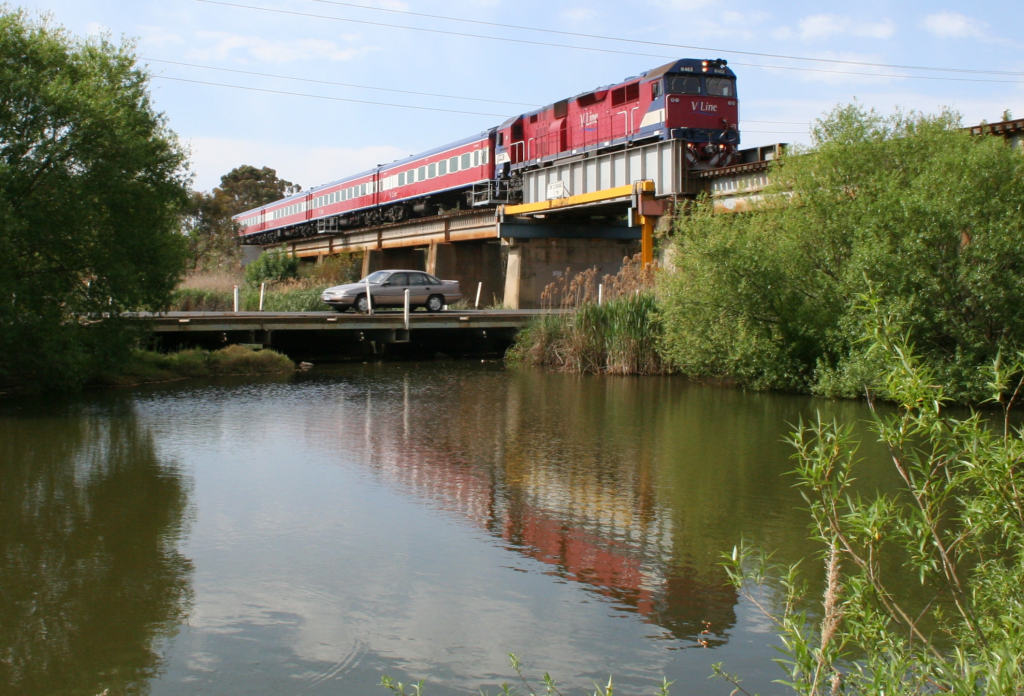
- Train crossing the Breakwater Bridge and ford, 2006

- Coordinates: 38.182°S 144.375°E
- Population: 1,014 (2016 census)
  - Density: 327/km^{2} (847/sq mi)
- Established: 1837
- Postcode(s): 3219
- Area: 3.1 km^{2} (1.2 sq mi)
- LGA(s): City of Greater Geelong
- State electorate(s): Geelong
- Federal division(s): Corio
Suburbs around Breakwater:
| South Geelong | Thomson | Thomson |
| Belmont | Breakwater | Whittington |
| Charlemont | Charlemont | St Albans Park |

Breakwater is a residential and industrial suburb of Geelong, Victoria, Australia, located on the Barwon River, 4 km south-south-east of the Geelong central business district. At the 2016 census Breakwater had a population of 1,014. Breakwater is home to the Geelong Racing Club, Geelong Racecourse and the Geelong Showgrounds.

== History ==
The name Breakwater originated from a rock weir constructed across the Barwon River in 1837 by Geelong's first police magistrate, Captain Foster Fyans. That breakwater stopped the flow of salt water into the fresh water river, allowing the Barwon River upstream to be used to supply fresh water for the town of Geelong.

The breakwater was also used as a ford to cross the river at that point. In 2012, the ford was replaced by a bridge about 300m upstream.

A post office opened on 1 January 1867 and closed in 1982.

The land between the industrial area and the river is part of the Barwon River flood plain.

=== Heritage sites ===
Breakwater contains a number of heritage listed sites, including:

- 42 Leather Street, Barwon Sewer Aqueduct
- Tucker Street, Sunnyside Wool Scour

== Census populations ==
The Census result of given below years

- 1861 - 136
- 1871 - 312
- 1981 - 1,521
