= Pakington Street =

Coordinates: 38°8′28″S 144°20′54″E

Pakington Street is a boutique shopping strip in Geelong, Victoria, Australia.

Known as “Pako” to local residents, the strip stretches between the suburbs of Geelong West at its north end and Newtown at the south. The south end of Pakington Street is commonly referred to as the "Paris end", due to its high density of high-end designer boutiques and exclusive restaurants, while the north end, better suited for retail and hospitality, is commonly referred to as the "Melbourne end".

While both ends have their followers, it is the Melbourne end that has been the most popular of recent times, in part, due to its position as the center of Geelong when it comes to cosmopolitan atmosphere and multiculturalism.

Every February, the street hosts the Pakington Street Festa or Pako Festa; a parade dedicated to celebrating the multicultural heritage of the area.
