= Geelong News =

Weekly newspaper in Geelong, Victoria, Australia

Geelong News for Belmont, Highton and Wandana Heights for 30 August 2006

The Geelong News is a free weekly paper delivered to houses in the Geelong region in Victoria, Australia. It is published on Wednesdays with a circulation of over 70,000 copies. The focus of most stories are local community issues and sport. Recently the newspaper started producing different content for different parts of Geelong.

== History ==
The Geelong News was first published as the Belmont and Highton News on 21 July 1965. The first edition was delivered to 4000 local households.

The publisher of the new newspaper was Dick Horniblow who was 27 years old at the time. He completed a Diploma of Agriculture, before working for three years at the Weekly Times, The Sun, and The Herald. He then worked for the Australian Associated Press in Melbourne, worked with the Gippsland Times in Sale, then was appointed editor of the Traralgon Journal.

The first issues were produced by Mr Horniblow and his wife Helen from their home in Hawthorn Avenue, Belmont. The newspaper moved to an office in High Street, Belmont in April 1966. At the same time circulation of the paper expanded to cover the adjoining suburb of Grovedale.

The name of the paper changed to the Geelong Suburban News in September 1968, when separate editions were launched for the suburbs of Newtown and Geelong West. By 1970 the newspaper covered the entire Geelong area.

1973 saw Horniblow, his brother Bryan Horniblow, and business partner purchase the Ballarat News. The Geelong News moved from High Street to Victoria House in Moorabool Street in 1975, by which time 25 permanent staff were employed by the group.

West Web printers was added to the Geelong News group in 1976, and in 1980 the group was acquired by the Geelong Advertiser group, which was then a subsidiary of The Herald and Weekly Times Ltd.

== See also ==
- Geelong Advertiser
- Geelong Independent
