= Geelong =

Port city in Victoria, Australia

Geelong Djilang/Djalang
- City
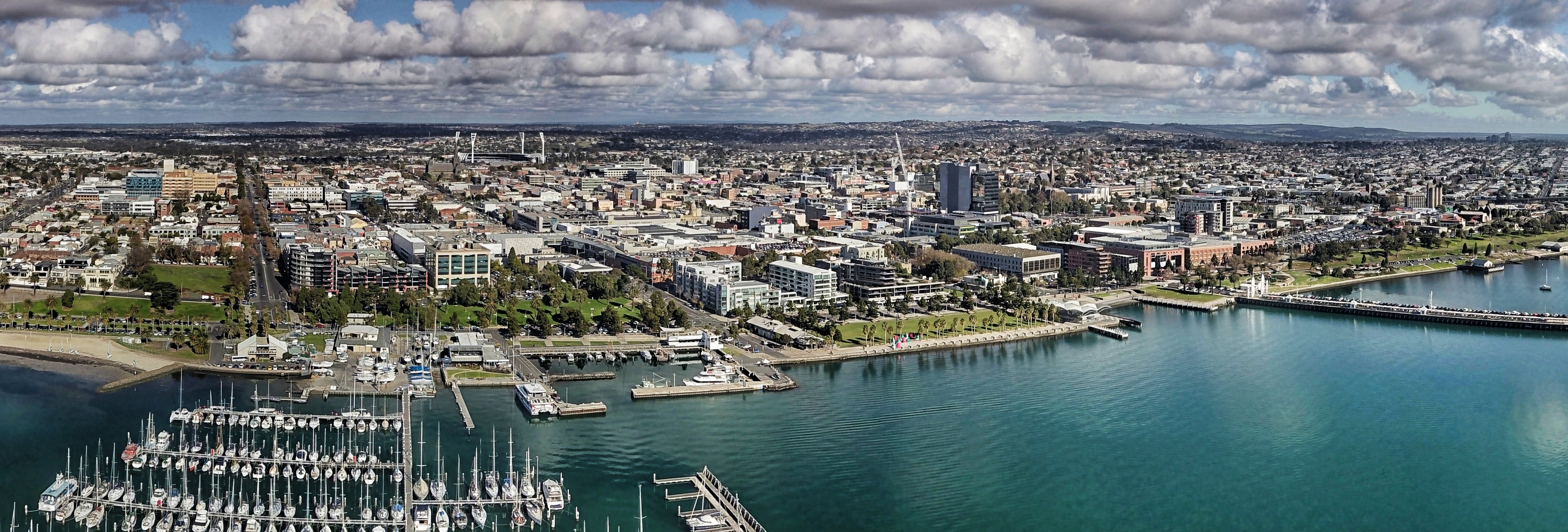
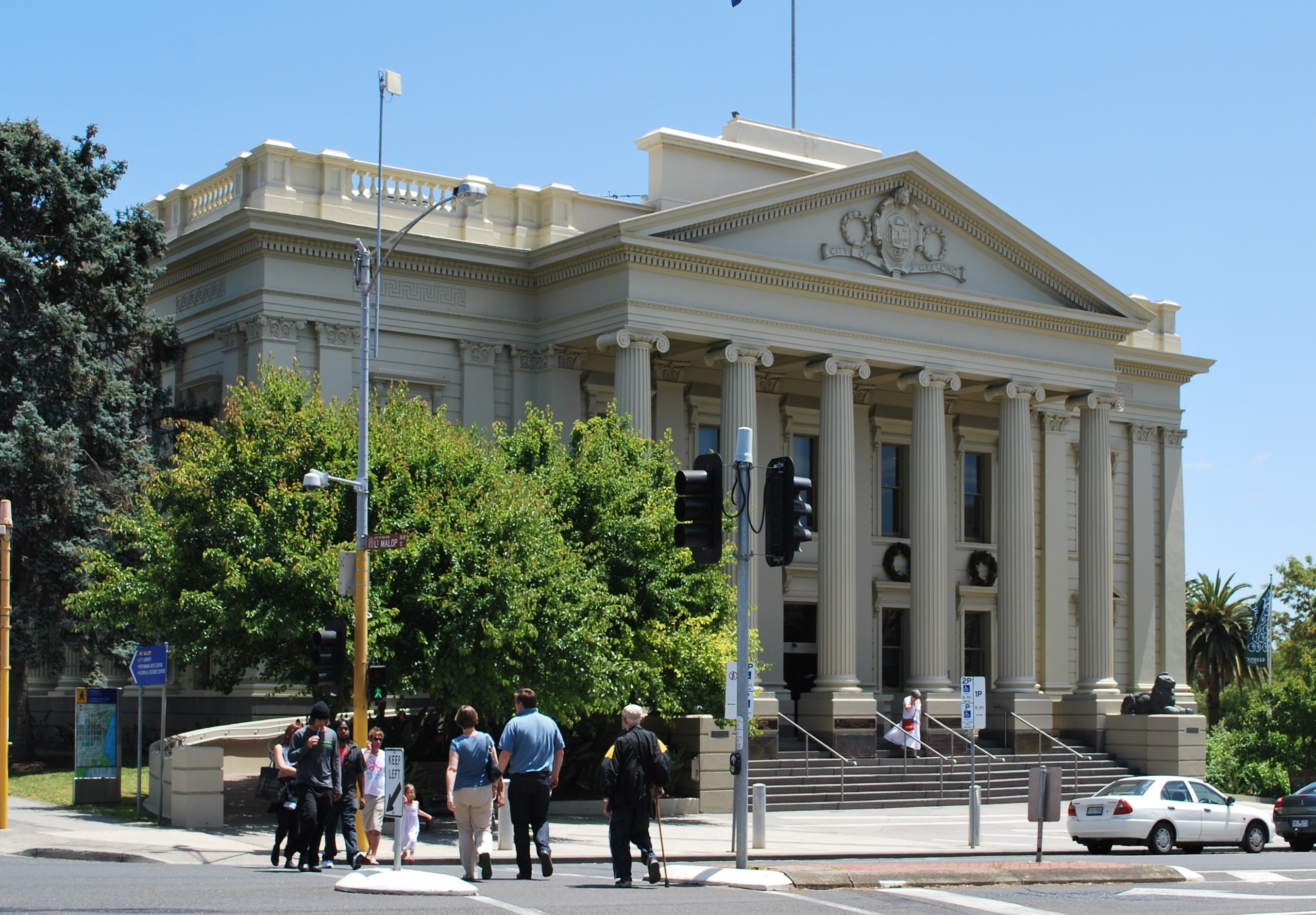
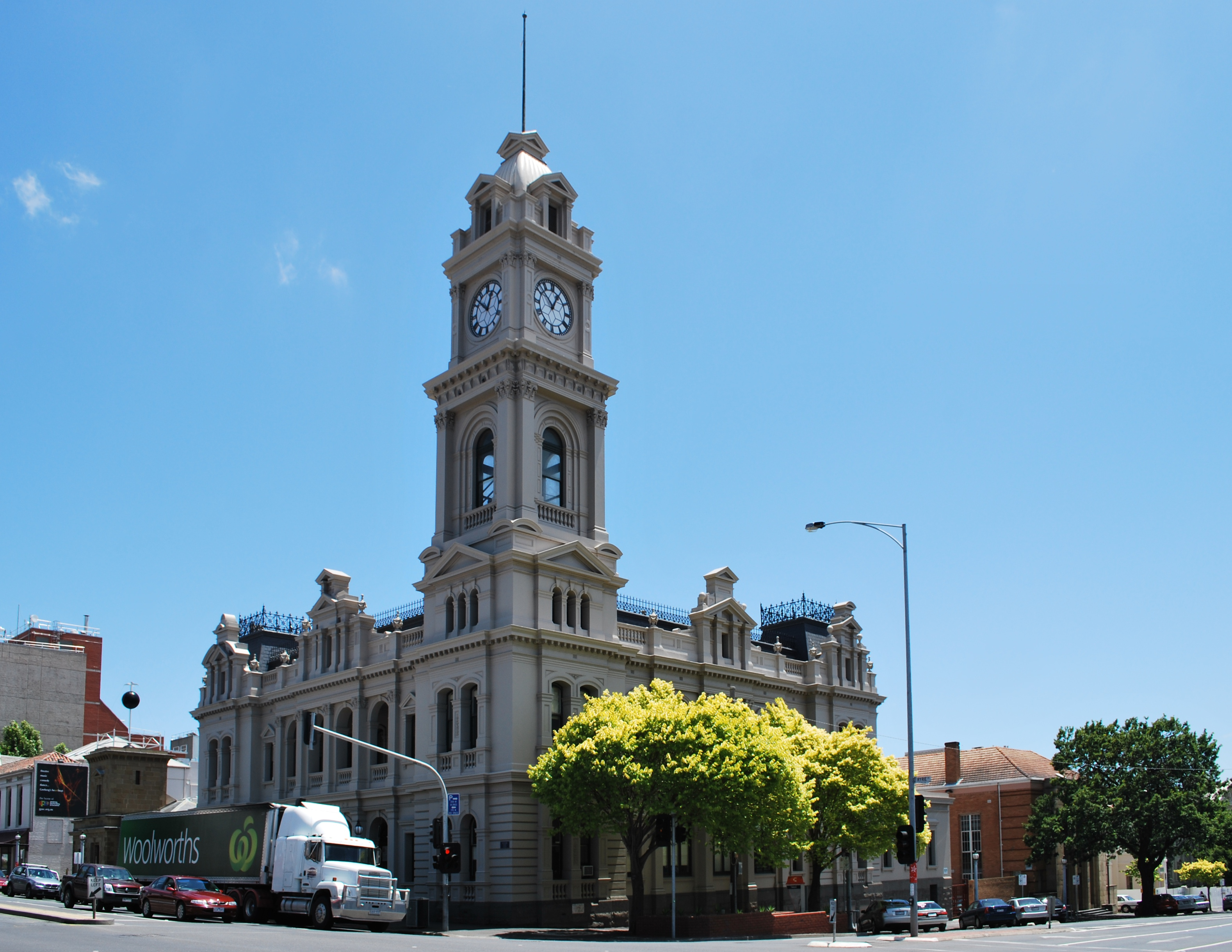
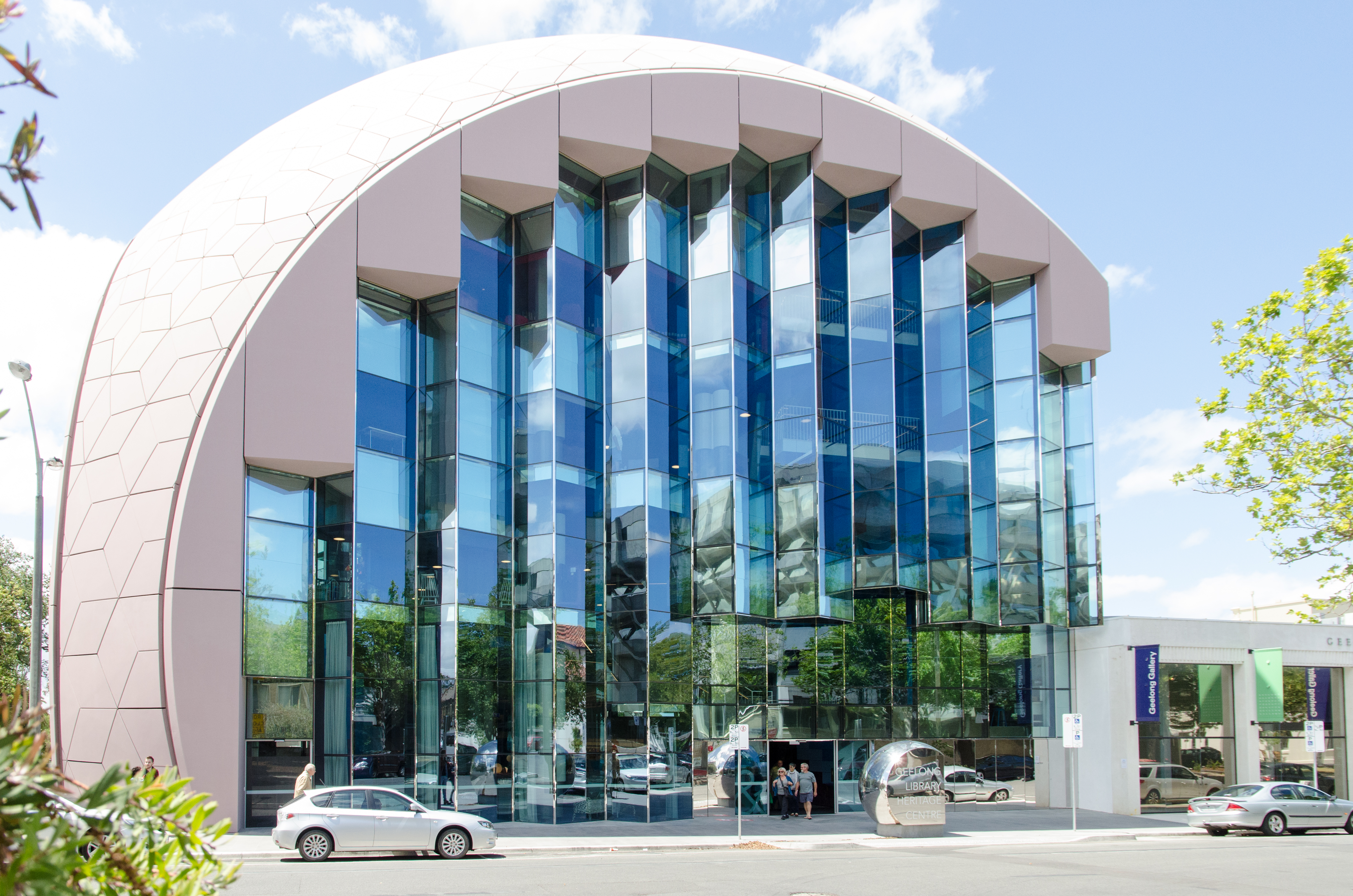
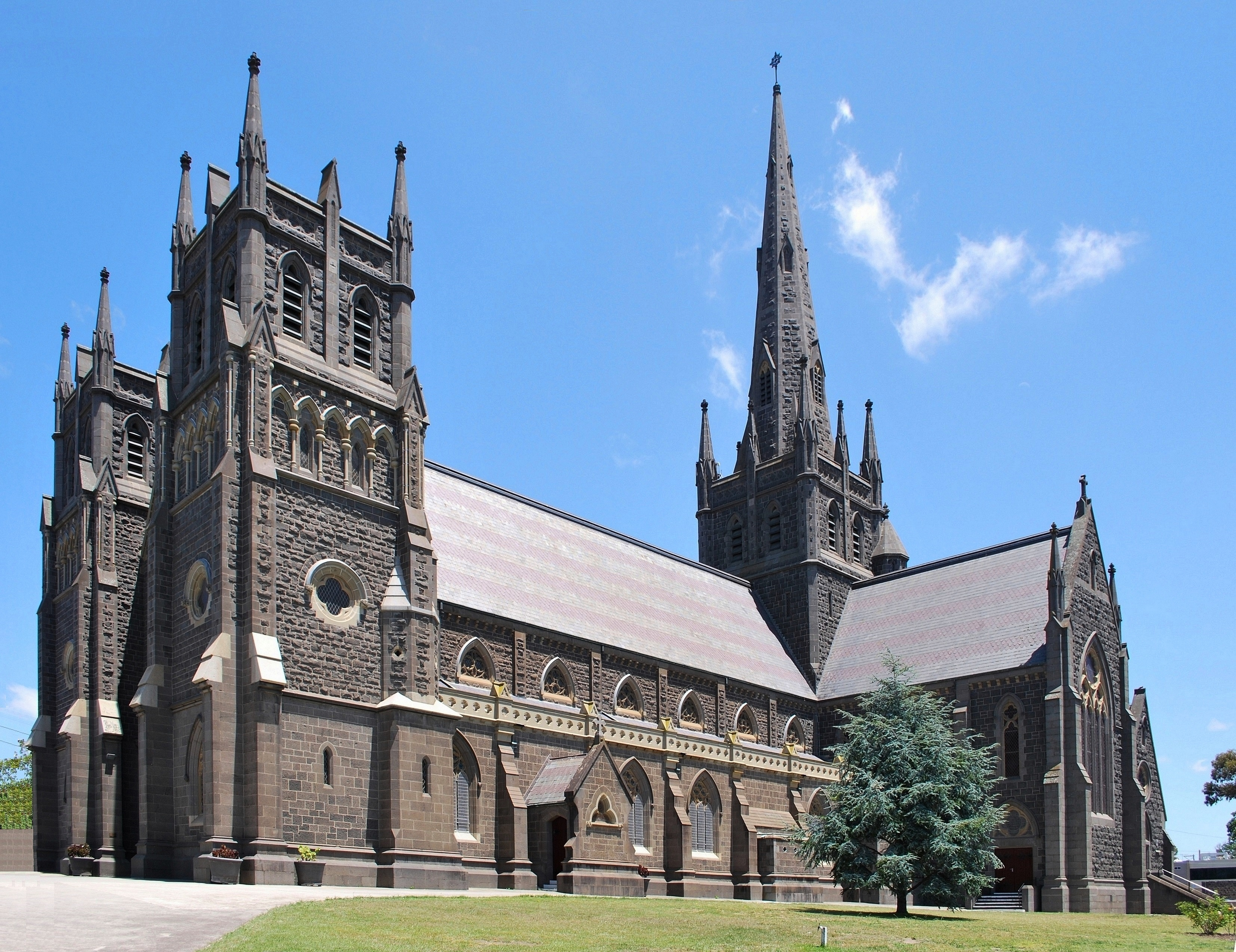
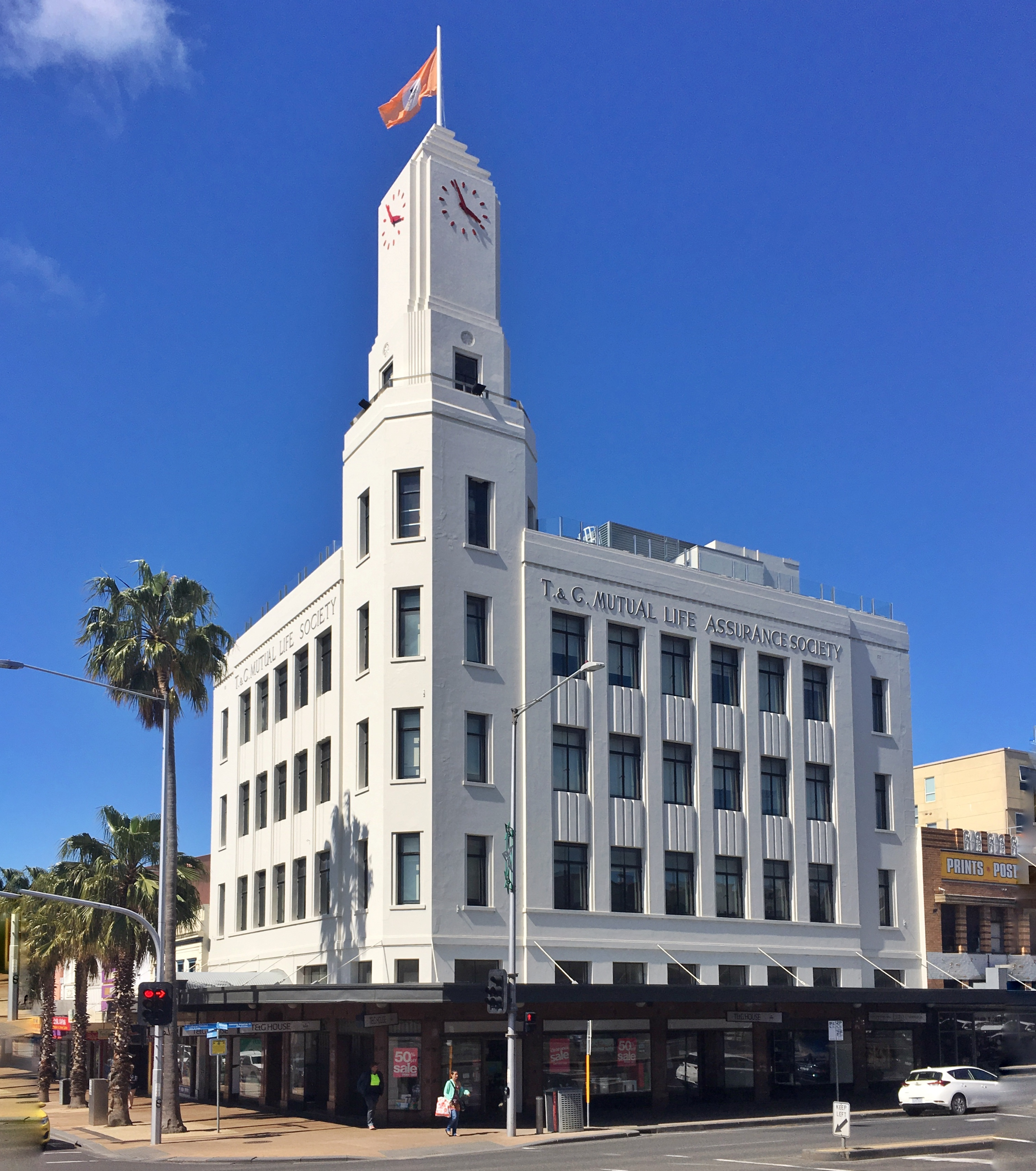
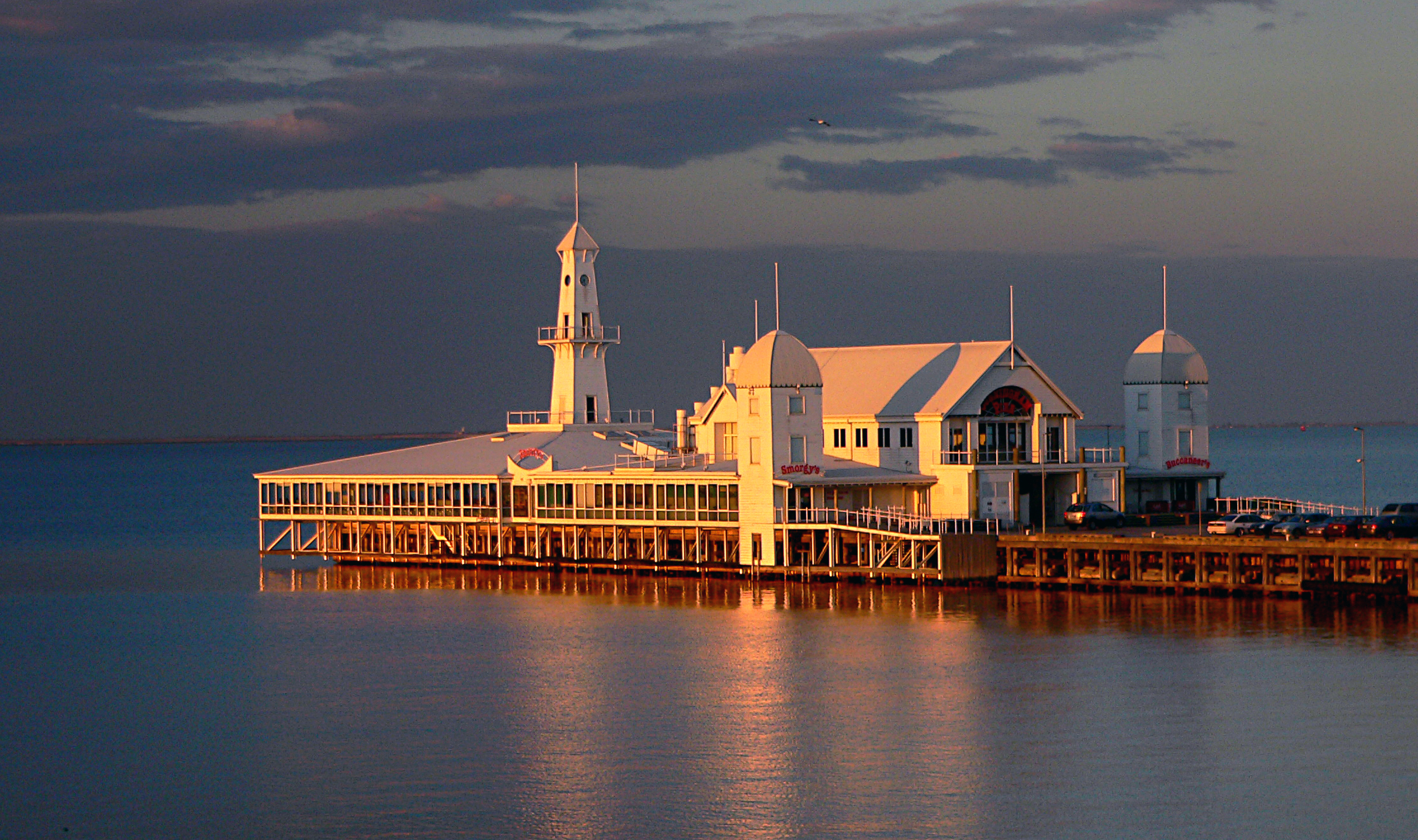
- City Centre and surrounds Town Hall Post Office Library & Heritage Centre St Mary of the Angels Basilica T & G Building Cunningham Pier

- Coordinates: 38°08′57″S 144°21′35″E
- Country: Australia
- State: Victoria
- LGA: City of Greater Geelong
- Location: 74 km (46 mi) SW of Melbourne; 75 km (47 mi) E of Colac; 166 km (103 mi) E of Warrnambool
- Established: 1838

Government
  - State electorates: Bellarine; Geelong; Lara; South Barwon
  - Federal divisions: Corangamite; Corio

Area
  - Total: 1,329 km^{2} (513 sq mi)
- Elevation: 21 m (69 ft)

Population
  - Total: 282,809 (2020) (12th)
  - Density: 212.80/km^{2} (551.15/sq mi)
- Time zone: UTC+10 (AEST)
  - Summer (DST): UTC+11 (AEDT)
- Postcode: 3220
- County: Grant
- Mean max temp: 19.3 °C (66.7 °F)
- Mean min temp: 9.0 °C (48.2 °F)
- Annual rainfall: 525.2 mm (20.68 in)

Geelong (/dʒɪˈlɒŋ/ jih-LONG; Wathawurrung: Djilang/Djalang) is a port city in Victoria, Australia, located at the western end of Corio Bay (the smaller western portion of Port Phillip Bay) and the left bank of Barwon River, about 75 km (47 mi) southwest of Melbourne. With an estimated population of 282,809 in 2023, Geelong is the second-largest city in the state of Victoria. It is the administrative centre for the City of Greater Geelong municipality, which is Port Phillip's only regional metropolitan area, and covers all the urban, rural, and coastal reserves around the city including the entire Bellarine Peninsula (Note: The Australian Bureau of Statistics defined urban area (SUA) for Geelong corresponds with the Greater Geelong LGA except that the SUA excludes the Portarlington Statistical Area (SA2), but includes the Point Lonsdale–Queenscliff and Torquay SA2s.) and from the plains of Lara in the north to the rolling hills of Waurn Ponds to the south, with Corio Bay to the east and the Barrabool Hills to the west.

The traditional owners of the land on which Geelong sits are the Wadawurrung (also known as Wathaurong) Aboriginal people of the Kulin nation. The modern name of Geelong, first recorded in 1827, was derived from the local Wadawurrung name for the region, Djilang, thought to mean "land", "cliffs", or "tongue of land or peninsula". The area was first surveyed by the European settlers in 1838, three weeks after Melbourne. During the 1850s Victorian gold rush, Geelong experienced a brief boom as the main port to the goldfields of central Victoria. The town then diversified into manufacturing, and during the 1860s became one of the largest manufacturing centres in Australia with its wool mills, ropeworks, and paper mills. During the city's early years, inhabitants of Geelong were often called Geelongites or Pivotonians, derived from the city's nickname of "The Pivot", referring to the city's role as a shipping and rail hub for Ballarat and the Western District.

Geelong was proclaimed a city in 1910, with industrial growth from this time until the 1960s establishing the city as a manufacturing centre for the state, and the population grew to over 100,000 by the mid-1960s. Population increases during the 21st century were largely due to growth in service industries, as the manufacturing sector has declined. Redevelopment of the inner city has occurred since the 1990s, as well as gentrification of inner suburbs, and the city has a population growth rate higher than the national average.

Geelong is an emerging healthcare, education, and advanced manufacturing centre. The city's economy is shifting quickly, and, despite experiencing the drawbacks of losing much of its heavy manufacturing, it is seeing much growth in other tertiary sectors, positioning itself as one of the leading non-capital Australian cities. It has become Australia's second fastest-growing city. Geelong is regarded as the "Gateway City" due to its critical location to surrounding western Victorian regional centres, providing a transport corridor for surrounding regions to the state capital Melbourne. It is also home to the Geelong Football Club, the second-oldest club in the Australian Football League.

== History ==
=== Etymology ===
The name Geelong comes from Djilang, used by the Wadawurrung traditional owners of the area at the time of settlement.

=== Early history and foundation ===
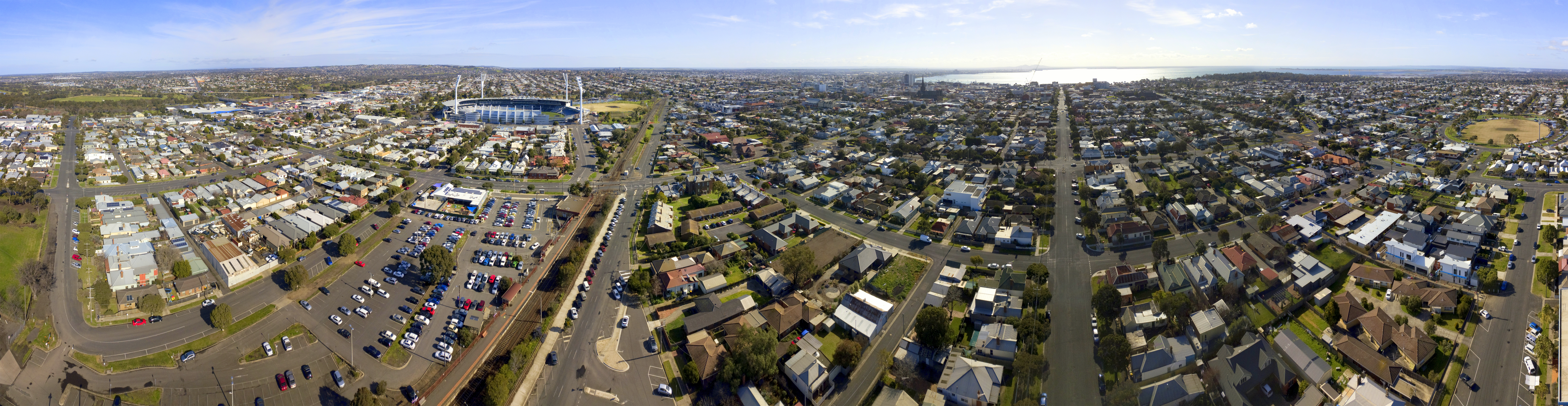
Aerial panorama of Geelong facing the bay. Taken August 2018.

The area of Geelong and the Bellarine Peninsula are the traditional lands of the Wadawurrung (Wathaurong) Indigenous Australian tribe. The first non-Indigenous person recorded as visiting the region was Lieutenant John Murray, who commanded the brig HMS Lady Nelson. After anchoring outside Port Phillip Heads (the narrow entrance to Port Phillip, onto which both Geelong and Melbourne now front), on 1 February 1802, he sent a small boat with six men to explore. Led by John Bowen, they explored the immediate area, returning to Lady Nelson on 4 February. On reporting favourable findings, Lady Nelson entered Port Phillip on 14 February, and did not leave until 12 March. During this time, Murray explored the Geelong area and, whilst on the far side of the bay, claimed the entire area for Britain. He named the bay Port King, after Philip Gidley King, then Governor of New South Wales. Governor King later renamed the bay Port Phillip after the first governor of New South Wales, Arthur Phillip. Arriving not long after Murray was Matthew Flinders, who entered Port Phillip on 27 April 1802. He charted the entire bay, including the Geelong area, believing he was the first to sight the huge expanse of water, but in a rush to reach Sydney before winter set in, he left Port Phillip on 3 May.

In January 1803, Surveyor-General Charles Grimes arrived at Port Phillip in the sloop Cumberland and mapped the area, including the future site of Geelong, but reported the area was unfavourable for settlement and returned to Sydney on 27 February. In October of the same year, HMS Calcutta led by Lieutenant Colonel David Collins arrived in the bay to establish the Sullivan Bay penal colony. Collins was dissatisfied with the area chosen, and sent a small party led by First Lieutenant J.H. Tuckey to investigate alternative sites. The party spent 22 to 27 October on the north shore of Corio Bay, where the first Aboriginal death at the hands of a European in Victoria occurred.

The next European visit to the area was by the explorers Hamilton Hume and William Hovell. They reached the northern edge of Corio Bay – the area of Port Phillip that Geelong now fronts – on 16 December 1824, and it was at this time they reported that the Aboriginals called the area Corayo, the bay being called Djillong. Hume and Hovell had been contracted to travel overland from Sydney to Port Phillip, and having achieved this, they stayed the night and began their return journey two days later on 18 December.

The convict William Buckley escaped from the Sullivan Bay settlement in 1803, and lived among the Wadawurrung people for 32 years on the Bellarine Peninsula. In 1835, John Batman used Indented Head as his base camp, leaving behind several employees whilst he returned to Tasmania (then known as Van Diemen's Land) for more supplies and his family. In this same year, Buckley surrendered to the party led by John Helder Wedge and was later pardoned by Lieutenant-Governor Sir George Arthur, and subsequently given the position of interpreter to the natives.

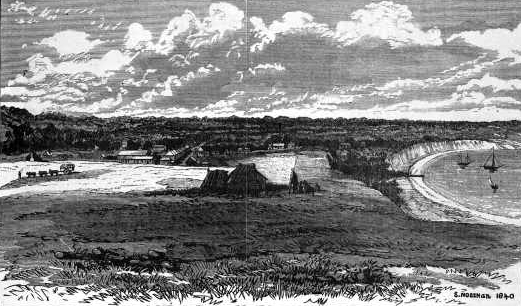
Depiction of early Geelong as a small collection of houses and paddocks by the bay

In March 1836, three squatters, David Fisher, James Strachan, and George Russell, arrived on Caledonia and settled the area. Geelong was first surveyed by Assistant Surveyor W. H. Smythe three weeks after Melbourne, and was gazetted as a town on 10 October 1838. There was already a church, hotel, store, wool store, and 82 houses, and the town population was 545. By 1841, the first wool had been sent to England and a regular steamer service was running between Geelong and Melbourne. Captain Foster Fyans was commissioned as the local Police Magistrate in 1837 and established himself on the Barwon River at the site of the area of present-day Fyansford. Fyans arranged the first muster of the Indigenous population and 275 Aboriginal people were found to be living in the area. Fyans distributed blankets, sugar, and flour to these people but soon ordered his soldiers to "click their triggers" at them when a lack of blankets caused anger. Fyans constructed a breakwater to improve the water supply to the city by preventing the salty lower reaches from mixing with fresh water and pooling water. In 1839, Charles Sievwright, the newly appointed Assistant Protector of Aborigines (for the western district) sets up camp on the Barwon River near Fyans ford.

The Geelong Keys were discovered around 1845 by Governor Charles La Trobe on Corio Bay. They were embedded in the stone in such a way that he believed that they had been there for 100–150 years, possibly dropped by Portuguese explorers. In 1849, Fyans was nominated as the inaugural Mayor of the Geelong Town Council and renowned fly fishing author Alfred Ronalds engraved the town seal. An early settler of Geelong, Alexander Thomson, for which the area of Thomson in Geelong East is named, settled on the Barwon River, and was Mayor of Geelong on five occasions from 1850 to 1858.

The population was 1,370 by 1848.

=== 1850s: Gold rush ===
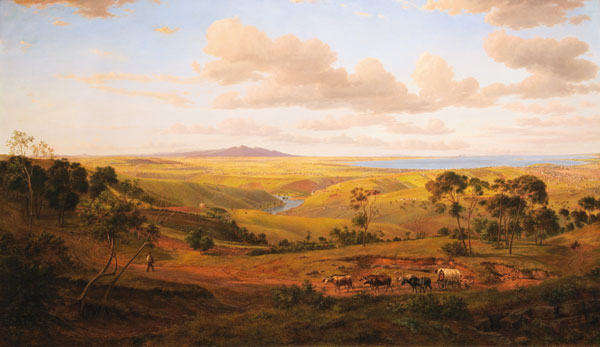
View of Geelong. 1856 oil painting by Eugene von Guérard.

Gold was discovered in nearby Ballarat in 1851, causing the Geelong population to grow to 23,000 people by the mid-1850s. To counter this, a false map was issued by Melbourne interests to new arrivals, showing the quickest road to the goldfields as being via Melbourne. The first issue of the Geelong Advertiser newspaper was published in 1840 by James Harrison, who also built the world's first ether vapour compression cycle ice-making and refrigeration machine in 1844, later being commissioned by a brewery in 1856 to build a machine that cooled beer.

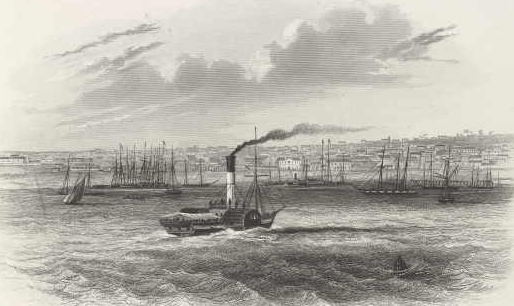
A paddlesteamer approaches busy Geelong Harbour in 1857.

The Geelong Hospital was opened in 1852, and construction on the Geelong City Hall commenced in 1855. Development of the Port of Geelong began with the creation of the first shipping channel in Corio Bay in 1853. The Geelong–Melbourne railway was built by the Geelong & Melbourne Railway Company in 1857. Rabbits were introduced to Australia in 1859 by Thomas Austin, who imported them from England for hunting purposes at his Barwon Park property near Winchelsea. One of Geelong's best-known department stores, Bright & Hitchcocks, was established in 1861, and the HM Prison Geelong, built using convict labour, was opened in 1864.

In 1866, Graham Berry started a newspaper, the Geelong Register, as a rival to the established Geelong Advertiser. When this proved unsuccessful, he bought the Advertiser and made himself editor of the now-merged papers. Using the paper as a platform, he was elected for Geelong West in 1869. In 1877, he switched to Geelong, which he represented until 1886, and served as Victorian Premier in 1875, 1877–1880, and 1880–1881. On the Market Square in the middle of the city, a clock tower was erected in 1856, and an Exhibition Building was opened in 1879.

=== 1860s: The 'Sleepy Hollow' ===
The gold rush had seen Ballarat and Bendigo grow larger than Geelong in terms of population. Melbourne critics dubbed Geelong "Sleepy Hollow", a tag that recurred many times in the following years. A number of industries became established in Geelong, including Victoria's first woollen mill at South Geelong in 1868. In 1869, the clipper Lightning caught fire at the Yarra Street pier and was cast adrift in Corio Bay to burn, before being sunk by artillery fire. Improvements to transport saw Geelong emerge as the centre of the Western District of Victoria, with railway lines extended towards Colac in 1876, and to Queenscliff in 1879. Construction of the Hopetoun shipping channel began in 1881 and completed in 1893.

The Geelong Cup was first held in 1872, and Victoria's first long-distance telephone call was made from Geelong to Queenscliff on 8 January 1878, only one year after the invention of the device itself. Geelong was also the home of a prosperous wine industry until the emergence of the sap-sucking insect Phylloxera vastatrix at Fyansford in 1875, which led to the Victorian Government ordering the destruction of all vines in the Geelong area to prevent the spread of the pest, killing the industry until the 1960s. Between 1886 and 1889, the central business district's major banks and insurance companies erected new premises in a solid and ornate character. The existing Geelong Post Office was built during this time and the Gordon Technical College was established. Further industrial growth occurred, with the Fyansford cement works being established in 1890.

The town became referred to as "The Pivot" in the 1860s, owing to its being a rail and shipping hub for western Victoria.

=== 1900s: A city develops ===
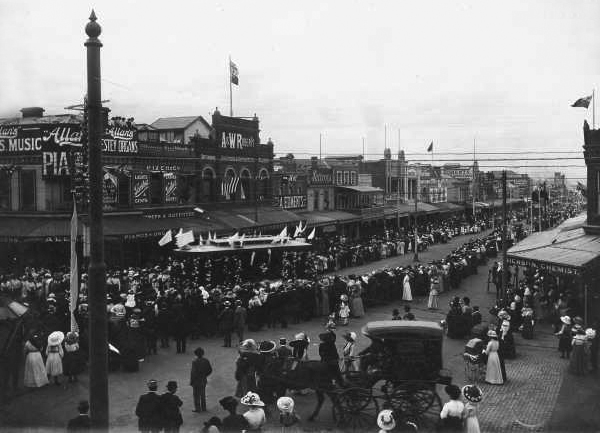
Opening of the Geelong tramway in 1912, Moorabool Street, Geelong

The town of Geelong officially became a city on 8 December 1910. The city gained a number of essential services, with electric light supplied by the Geelong Power Station starting in 1902, the Geelong Harbour Trust was formed in December 1905, and the Geelong Waterworks and Sewerage Trust formed in 1908. Electric trams began operation in 1912, travelling from the city centre to the suburbs until their demise in 1956. The first of many stores on the Market Square was opened in 1913, and the first Gala Day festival was held in 1916.

Geelong's industrial growth accelerated in the 1920s: woollen mills, fertiliser plants, Ford's vehicle plant at Norlane, and the Corio whisky distillery were all established in this period. The Geelong Advertiser radio station 3GL (now K-Rock) commenced transmission in 1930, the Great Ocean Road was opened in 1932, and in 1934, the T & G Building opened on the most prominent intersection in the city, the corner of Ryrie and Moorabool Streets.

By 1936, Geelong had displaced Ballarat as Victoria's second-largest city.

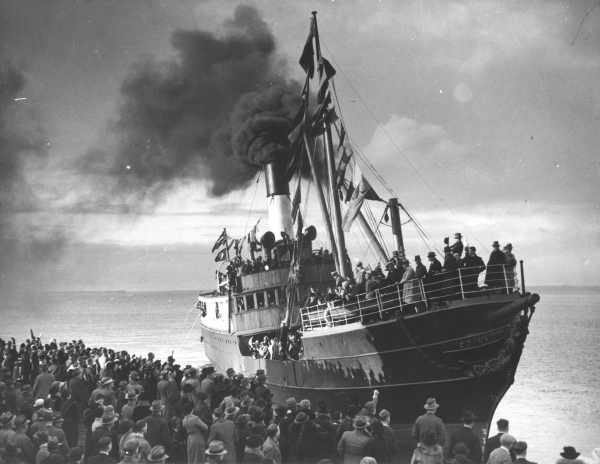
The steamboat Edina leaving Geelong on its final journey on 21 June 1938

In 1938, one of the last Port Phillip Bay steamers, Edina, made its final trip to Geelong, ending a period of seaside excursions and contests for the fastest trip. The Eastern Beach foreshore beautification and pool was completed in 1939 after almost 10 years of work.

On the eve of World War II, the International Harvester works were opened beside Ford at North Shore, along with a grain elevator at nearby Corio Quay, and the Shell Australia oil refinery.

=== Post-war period ===
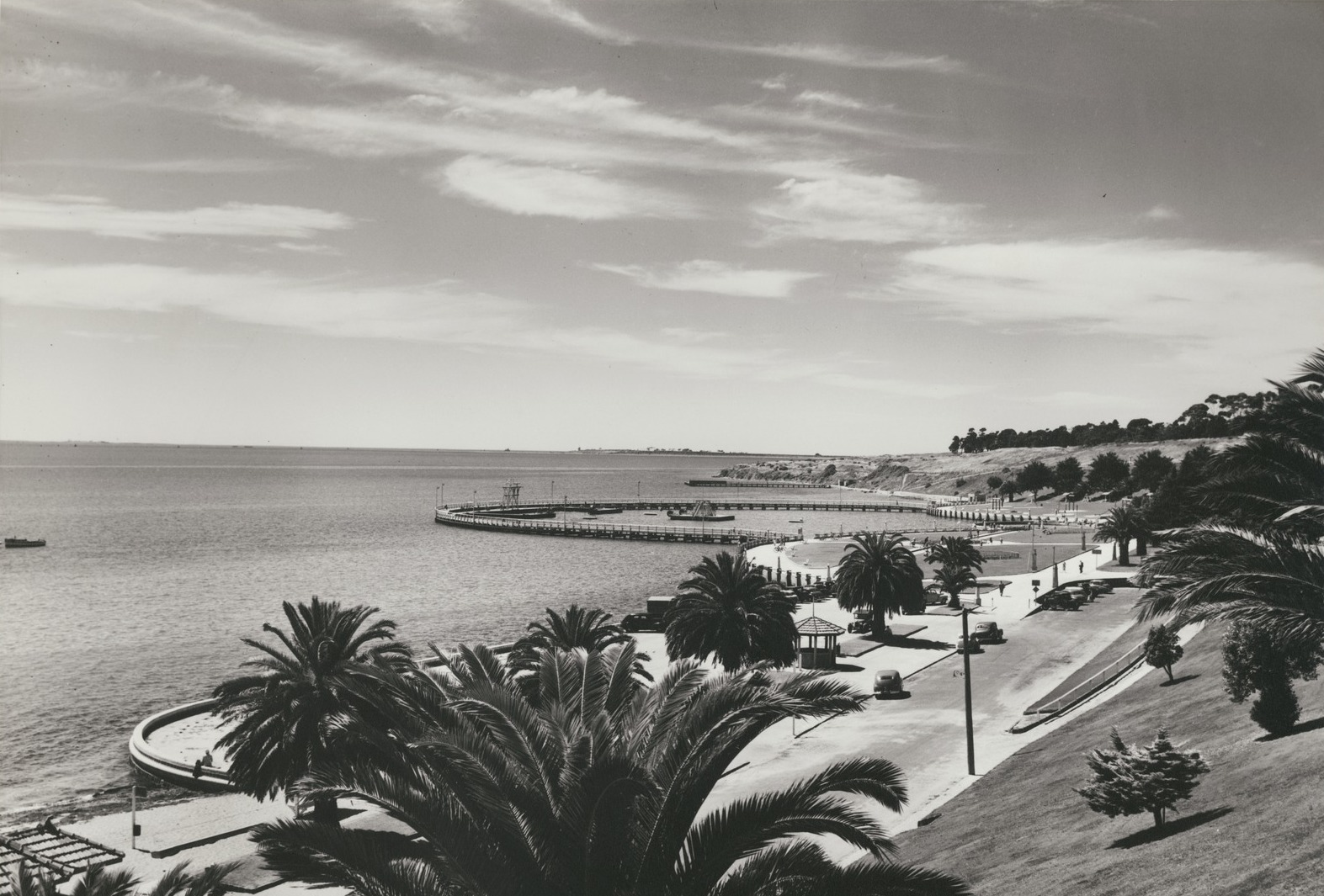
Eastern Beach in 1950

Government housing was constructed in the suburbs of East Geelong, Norlane, North Shore, and Corio from the 1950s. The banks of the Barwon River burst in 1952, inundating nearby Belmont Common.

Geelong continued to expand with Corio, Highton, and Belmont growing at such a rate that in February 1967, Geelong accounted for 21% of private home development in Greater Melbourne. Private vehicles became the city's major mode of transport. The first parking meters in the city were introduced in 1961, new petrol stations were constructed, and the city's first supermarket, operated by Woolworths, opened in 1965. Later, support came for Cycling in Geelong with Australia's first bike plan in 1977.

Industrial growth continued with a second cement works operating at Waurn Ponds by 1964 and the Alcoa Point Henry aluminium smelter constructed in 1962.

Federal government policy changes on tariff protection led to the closure of many Geelong industrial businesses from the 1970s. Most woollen mills closed in 1974 and hectares of warehouse space in the city centre were left empty after wool-handling practices changed. The Target head office opened in North Geelong, Deakin University was established at Waurn Ponds in 1974, and the Geelong Performing Arts Centre opened in 1981. Later, the Australian Animal Health Laboratory was opened in 1985, and the National Wool Museum in 1988.

Market Square, the first enclosed shopping centre in the city, was opened in 1985, with neighbouring Bay City Plaza opened in 1988. The Pyramid Building Society, founded in Geelong in 1959, collapsed in 1990, leaving debts of AU$1.3 billion to over 200,000 depositors, and causing the Geelong economy to stagnate. On 18 May 1993, the City of Greater Geelong was formed by the amalgamation of a number of smaller municipalities with the former City of Geelong. The Waterfront Geelong redevelopment, started in 1994, was designed to enhance use and appreciation of Corio Bay and in 1995 the Barwon River overflowed in the worst flood since 1952.

=== 21st century ===
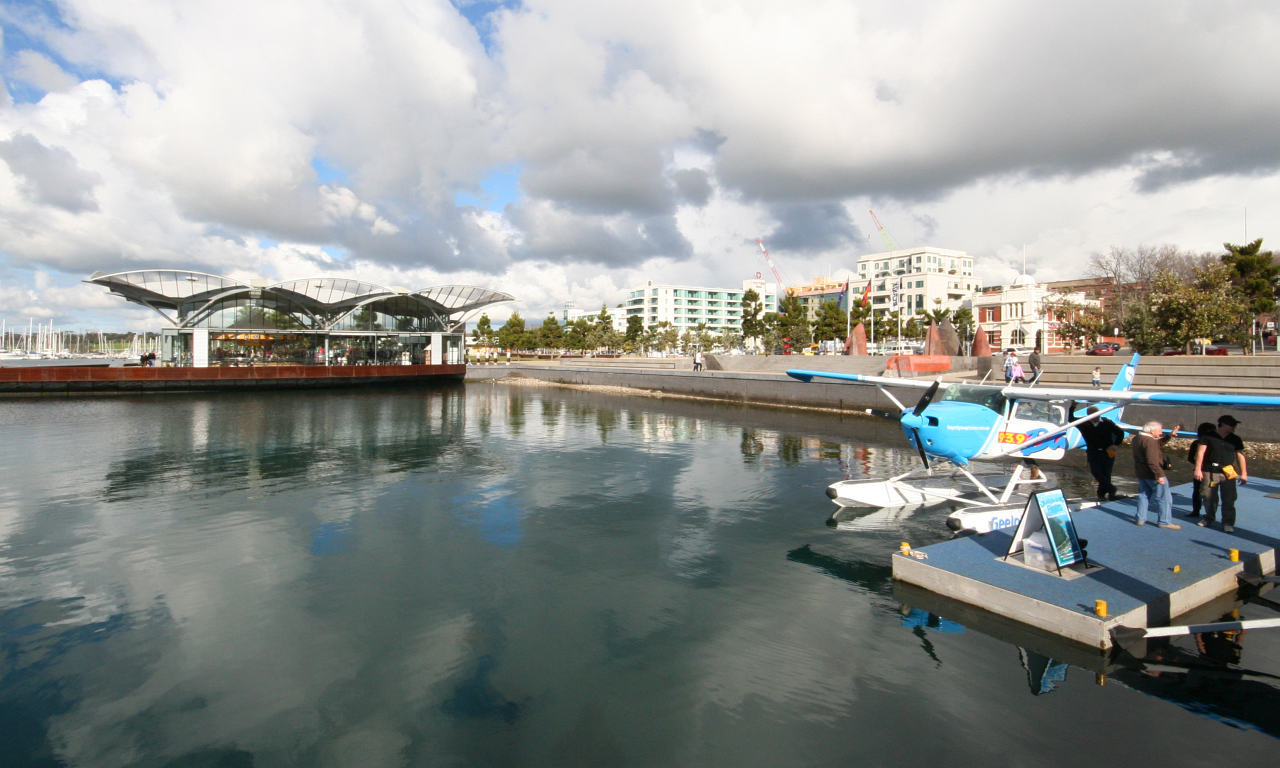
Steampacket Quay, showing the Carousel Pavilion, 2007

In 2000, the Carousel Pavilion was opened as a landmark and symbol of the refurbishment of the Geelong waterfront. In 2004, Avalon Airport was upgraded to accommodate interstate passenger travel, providing a base for low-cost airline Jetstar to serve the Melbourne and Geelong urban areas. Geelong also began expanding southwards, with approximately 2,500 hectares of land designated for the Armstrong Creek growth area, a major residential development planned to accommodate between 55,000 and 65,000 people. In 2006, construction began on the Geelong Ring Road, designed to replace the Princes Highway through Geelong from Corio to Waurn Ponds. It opened in 2009.

More than A$500 million worth of major construction was underway in 2007. Major projects included the $150 million Westfield Geelong expansion works, involving a flyover of Yarra Street, the city's first Big W store, and an additional 70 new speciality stores; the $37 million Deakin Waterfront campus redevelopment, and the $23 million Deakin Medical School; the $50 million Edgewater apartment development on the waterfront; a number of multimillion-dollar office developments in the CBD; and a new $30 million aquatic centre in Waurn Ponds.

Major developments within Geelong are advocated by influential, non-government group the Committee for Geelong and the region's local government alliance, G21 Geelong Region Alliance.

The City of Greater Geelong and four other local municipalities form part of the alliance which identifies the Geelong region's priorities, and advocates all levels of government for funding and implement the projects. G21 developed 'The Geelong Region Plan – a sustainable growth strategy' which was launched by Premier Brumby in 2007. The plan provided a strategic framework for the region's development. In addition, major projects such as the Geelong Ring Road Connections and duplication of the Princes Highway West obtained funding due to the combined efforts of the region's municipalities. By May 2017, G21 had identified a further 13 Priority Projects for the Geelong region.

The Victoria Government announced the relocation of the Transport Accident Commission headquarters from Melbourne to Geelong in October 2006, which created 850 jobs and an annual economic benefit over $59 million to the Geelong region. The construction of the $80-million Brougham Street headquarters was completed in late 2008. In November 2008, Ford Australia announced that its Australian-designed I6 engine would be re-engineered to meet the latest emissions regulations, and that the Geelong engine manufacturing plant would consequently be upgraded.

During the late 2000s, proposals for new residential apartment towers and commercial developments reflected growing interest in higher-density development around the Geelong waterfront and central business district. On 10 July 2008, approval was granted for a $100-million twin-tower apartment complex of 16 and 12 floors, on Mercer St at the north-western edge of the city centre. At the time of completion, Miramar (one of the towers) became the tallest apartment building in the city, taking the title from the Mercure Hotel. Further highrise developments were proposed under the City of Greater Geelong's Geelong Western Edge strategic plan, including an A$17-million 11-storey apartment tower next to the Deakin Waterfront Campus.

In 2012, a design competition for a "city icon" was run for the City of Geelong by Deakin University and Senia Lawyers. The recipient of the prize and winning design entry was JOH Architects and their design titled "The Sea Dragon".

In February 2014, aluminium producer Alcoa announced the closure of its Point Henry aluminium smelter and associated operations. The smelter had commenced production in 1963 and operated for more than five decades before closing in 2014. The closure ended aluminium smelting at Point Henry, with the site subsequently undergoing decommissioning and environmental remediation.

In June 2015, the Regional Rail Link opened, providing a new railway route between Geelong and Melbourne via Wyndham Vale and Tarneit. The $3.65 billion project separated regional passenger services from sections of Melbourne's metropolitan rail network, increasing capacity and improving service reliability for Geelong commuters. The project also involved the construction of new railway stations at Wyndham Vale and Tarneit.

Geelong's new Library and Heritage Centre opened to the public in November 2015. The facility provided new research facilities, display areas and hosts Geelong's extensive heritage, modern and Indigenous. The library was awarded the Sir Zelman Cowen Award for Public Architecture in 2016.

In April 2016, the Victorian Government dismissed the Greater Geelong City Council following a commission of inquiry into the council's governance and workplace culture. The inquiry identified problems with bullying, organisational dysfunction and poor governance. Three administrators were appointed to oversee the municipality until council elections in October 2017, when elected local government was restored.

On 7 October 2016, Ford Australia ceased manufacturing operations at its Geelong engine plant, coinciding with the closure of its vehicle assembly plant at Broadmeadows. The closures brought an end to 91 years of Ford vehicle and engine manufacturing in Australia, although the company retained its Australian design, engineering and testing operations. Together with the closure of the Point Henry aluminium smelter two years earlier, the end of Ford's manufacturing operations marked a significant change in Geelong's industrial economy.

During the late 2010s, Geelong underwent further urban redevelopment, including the Green Spine Project along Malop Street. The project was designed to establish a continuous green corridor connecting Johnstone Park with the Geelong Botanic Gardens, incorporating street trees, landscaping, public art and bicycle lanes separated from pedestrian and vehicle traffic. Other improvements to the central business district included the redevelopment of sections of Little Malop Street and landscaping works at Johnstone Park.

Redevelopment also continued in Geelong's suburbs. Streetscape improvements were undertaken along Pakington Street in Geelong West, while pedestrian improvements were proposed for Shannon Avenue in Manifold Heights. In Rippleside, the Balmoral Quay residential and waterfront development included proposals for improved pedestrian connections between Ripplside Park and St Helens Park, as well as beach restoration and expanded boat facilities. Meanwhile, Worksafe Victoria opened up a new 14-storey building on Malop St. It opened in mid-2018 and was the tallest building until two residential high-rises, The Mercer and Miramar Apartments, were completed in late 2019.

On 23 October 2022, Spirit of Tasmania commenced passenger and freight operations from the newly constructed Spirit of Tasmania Quay at Corio Quay in North Geelong, following the relocation of its Victorian terminal from Station Pier in Port Melbourne, where it had operated for 37 years. The purpose-built terminal included passenger facilities, vehicle marshalling areas and freight infrastructure.

On 19 August 2023, Geelong Arts Centre reopened following a $140 million redevelopment of its Little Malop Street facilities. The project, undertaken over approximately four years, added new theatres, flexible performance spaces, dining facilities and an atrium plaza. The redevelopment followed an earlier $38.5 million upgrade of the centre's Ryrie Street facilities, completed in 2019.

Geelong had been selected as one of the regional host cities for the 2026 Commonwealth Games, which were to be held across regional Victoria. The city was scheduled to host nine sports and the closing ceremony at Kardinia Park, with new sporting facilities and an athletes' village planned for its southern suburbs. However, on 18 July 2023, the Victorian Government announced its withdrawal from hosting the Games, citing substantial increases in projected costs. The cancellation ended plans for Geelong to host the events, although the government announced that funding would instead be directed towards regional sporting infrastructure, housing and other projects.

In March 2024, the fifth stage of Kardinia Park's redevelopment was completed, including the construction of the Joel Selwood Stand at the northern end of the stadium. The $142 million project increased the stadium's capacity to approximately 40,000 spectators and provided new spectator amenities, sporting facilities and a media centre. The stand officially opened on 16 March 2024, during the Geelong Football Club's first home match of the AFL season against St Kilda.

On the evening of 15 April 2026, a major fire broke out at Viva Energy's Geelong oil refinery in Corio, one of Australia's two remaining operating petroleum refineries. The fire took approximately 13 hours to bring under control and caused significant disruption to refinery operations. Emergency authorities monitored smoke and air quality in surrounding suburbs, while the Environment Protection Authority investigated the discharge of firefighting water into Corio Bay. The incident also affected fuel production, with repairs and recovery work continuing in the following months.

On 21 June 2026, the $449 million Nyaal Banyul Geelong Convention and Event Centre was officially opened on the Geelong waterfront. Developed as part of the Geelong City Deal, the complex includes a 1,000-seat theatre, exhibition halls, conference and meeting facilities, hospitality venues and a public plaza. The venue commenced hosting events in July 2026.

== Geography ==
Map of the Geelong urban area and the City of Greater Geelong

Geelong is located on the shores of the western tip of Corio Bay, a southwestern inlet of Port Phillip Bay. During clear weather, the distant Melbourne skyline is visible from higher areas of Geelong when viewed across the waters of Port Phillip. The Barwon River flows through the southern fringe of the Geelong city centre before entering Lake Connewarre and the estuary at Barwon Heads before draining into the Bass Strait. The city is situated just east of the gap between the Otway Ranges and Brisbane Ranges, and commands the only lowland passage between the Werribee Plain and Western Volcanic Plains.

Geologically, the oldest rocks in the area date back to the Cambrian period 500 million years ago, with volcanic activities occurring in the Devonian period 350 million years ago. In prehistoric times water covered much of the lowlands that are now Geelong, with the Barwon River estuary located at Belmont Common, the course of the river being changed when Mount Moriac erupted and lava was sent eastwards towards Geelong.

To the east of the city are the Bellarine Hills and the undulating plains of the Bellarine Peninsula. To the west are the sandstone-derived Barrabool Hills and basalt Mount Duneed, and the volcanic plains to the north of Geelong extend to the Brisbane Ranges and the You Yangs. Soils vary from sandy loam, basalt plains, and river loam to rich volcanic soils, suitable for intensive farming, grazing, forestry, and viticulture.

Many materials used to construct buildings were quarried from Geelong, such as bluestone from the You Yangs and sandstone from the Brisbane Ranges. A small number of brown coal deposits exist in the Geelong region, most notably at Anglesea, where it has been mined to fuel Alcoa's Anglesea Power Station since 1969. Limestone has also been quarried for cement production at Fyansford since 1888, and Waurn Ponds since 1964.

=== City and suburbs ===
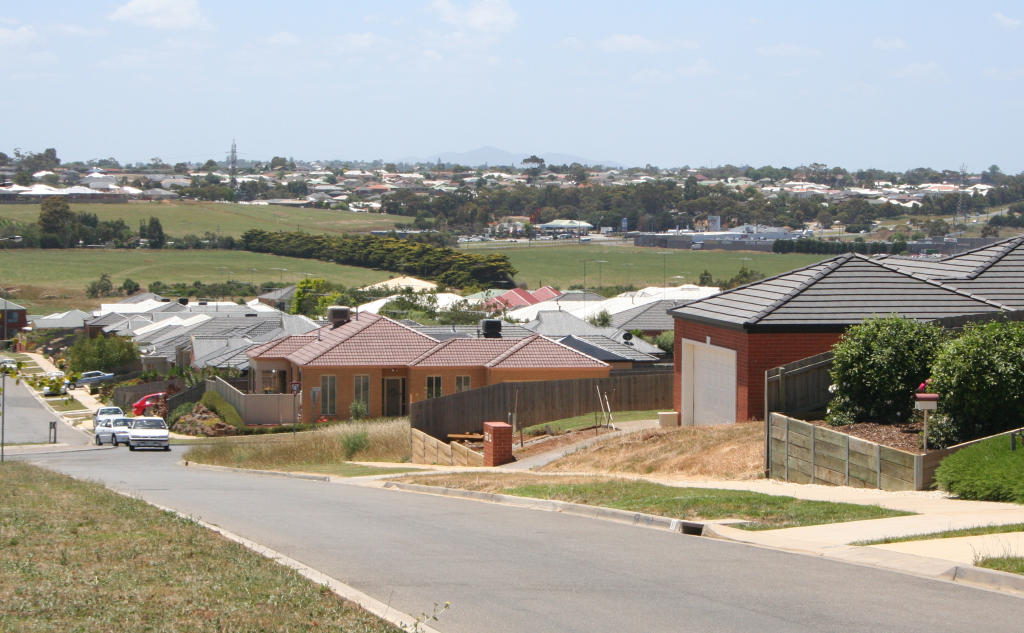
Suburban expansion in Grovedale, 2007

Geelong has over 60 suburbs, including the following: Anakie, Armstrong Creek, Avalon, Balliang, Barwon Heads, Batesford, Bell Park, Bell Post Hill, Bellarine, Belmont, Breakwater, Breamlea, Ceres, Charlemont, City of Greater Geelong, Clifton Springs, Connewarre, Corio, Curlewis, Drumcondra, Drysdale, East Geelong, Fyansford, Geelong West, Grovedale, Hamlyn Heights, Herne Hill, Highton, Indented Head, Lara, Leopold, Little River, Lovely Banks, Manifold Heights, Mannerim, Marcus Hill, Marshall, Moolap, Moorabool, Mount Duneed, Newcomb, Newtown, Norlane, North Geelong, North Shore, Ocean Grove, Point Lonsdale, Point Wilson, Portarlington, Queenscliff, Rippleside, South Geelong, St Albans Park, St Leonards, Staughton Vale, Swan Bay, Thomson, Wallington, Wandana Heights, Waurn Ponds, and Whittington.

Development in Geelong started on the shores of Corio Bay in what is now the inner city. Development later spread to the south towards the Barwon River, and the hill of Newtown and Geelong West. Major development south of the river in Belmont did not start until the 1920s, stimulated by the construction of a new bridge over the river in 1926, and the extension of the Geelong tramway system in 1927. Industrial areas were traditionally located on the Corio Bay for port access, or the Barwon River for waste disposal.

In the interwar and post-World War II years, heavy industry continued to establish itself in the flatter northern suburbs, where industries such as the Geelong Oil Refinery and the former Ford engine plant reside. Residential development also spread to Corio and Norlane in the north, with new Housing Commission of Victoria estates built to cater for employees of the new industries. From the 1960s, residential growth spread to the Highton hills in the south and North Geelong following prosperous industries like the gasworks, followed by Grovedale in the 1970s. A number of light industrial areas were also established in Breakwater, Moolap, and South Geelong.

Changing cargo-handling methods at the Port of Geelong left woolstores in inner Geelong unused, redevelopment beginning in the 1980s with the expansion of Westfield Geelong towards Corio Bay, and culminating in the Waterfront Geelong development. Gentrification of former working-class inner suburbs such as Geelong West, North Geelong, and South Geelong has also occurred. The major residential growth corridors are north towards Lara, east towards Leopold, and south towards Mount Duneed as the Armstrong Creek Growth Area.

=== Climate ===
Geelong has a temperate oceanic climate (Cfb in the Köppen climate classification) with dominant westerly winds, variable clouds, moderate rainfall that tends to fall lightly, mild to warm summers, and cool winters. February is the hottest month and July is the coldest. The highest temperature recorded was 47.4 °C (117.3 °F) on 7 February 2009 during a two-week-long heat wave, with the lowest of −4.3 °C (24.3 °F) recorded on 24 July 1997. The city gets around 37.6 clear days annually.

The average annual rainfall is around 525.2 mm (20.7 in), which makes Geelong one of the driest cities in Australia, owing to the pronounced rain shadow of the Otway Ranges to the south-west. Within the city, rainfall shows a strong gradient from south to north, so that the southernmost suburbs can receive around 700 mm (28 in) whilst more northerly Lara receives as little as 425 mm (17 in), which is the lowest rainfall in southern Victoria.

Climate data for Geelong Racecourse (Breakwater) (normals 2011–2026, extremes 2011–2026)
Month	Jan	Feb	Mar	Apr	May	Jun	Jul	Aug	Sep	Oct	Nov	Dec	Year
Record high °C (°F)	45.4 (113.7)	42.0 (107.6)	39.8 (103.6)	35.7 (96.3)	27.8 (82.0)	20.4 (68.7)	21.8 (71.2)	25.8 (78.4)	30.9 (87.6)	35.5 (95.9)	39.2 (102.6)	45.1 (113.2)	45.4 (113.7)
Mean daily maximum °C (°F)	26.0 (78.8)	25.6 (78.1)	24.3 (75.7)	20.8 (69.4)	17.5 (63.5)	14.6 (58.3)	14.4 (57.9)	15.5 (59.9)	17.8 (64.0)	20.2 (68.4)	21.9 (71.4)	24.2 (75.6)	20.2 (68.4)
Daily mean °C (°F)	20.4 (68.7)	20.1 (68.2)	18.9 (66.0)	15.9 (60.6)	13.0 (55.4)	10.6 (51.1)	10.4 (50.7)	11.1 (52.0)	12.9 (55.2)	14.8 (58.6)	16.5 (61.7)	18.5 (65.3)	15.3 (59.5)
Mean daily minimum °C (°F)	14.8 (58.6)	14.6 (58.3)	13.5 (56.3)	11.0 (51.8)	8.5 (47.3)	6.6 (43.9)	6.4 (43.5)	6.6 (43.9)	7.9 (46.2)	9.3 (48.7)	11.1 (52.0)	12.7 (54.9)	10.3 (50.4)
Record low °C (°F)	8.3 (46.9)	7.6 (45.7)	6.9 (44.4)	3.2 (37.8)	0.3 (32.5)	−0.4 (31.3)	−2.2 (28.0)	−0.2 (31.6)	0.7 (33.3)	2.1 (35.8)	4.2 (39.6)	5.9 (42.6)	−2.2 (28.0)
Average rainfall mm (inches)	39.4 (1.55)	29.8 (1.17)	24.2 (0.95)	46.9 (1.85)	42.9 (1.69)	53.0 (2.09)	39.7 (1.56)	41.3 (1.63)	47.4 (1.87)	56.3 (2.22)	55.8 (2.20)	32.2 (1.27)	510.3 (20.09)
Average rainy days (≥ 0.2 mm)	6.0	6.0	8.4	11.5	14.4	15.5	17.4	16.5	15.8	13.2	11.3	9.3	145.3
Source: Bureau of Meteorology

Climate data for Geelong Airport (normals 1983–2011, extremes 1964–2011)
Month	Jan	Feb	Mar	Apr	May	Jun	Jul	Aug	Sep	Oct	Nov	Dec	Year
Record high °C (°F)	45.3 (113.5)	47.4 (117.3)	41.5 (106.7)	34.8 (94.6)	29.2 (84.6)	23.4 (74.1)	23.0 (73.4)	27.5 (81.5)	31.9 (89.4)	37.1 (98.8)	40.7 (105.3)	43.1 (109.6)	47.4 (117.3)
Mean maximum °C (°F)	39.7 (103.5)	38.1 (100.6)	35.0 (95.0)	29.8 (85.6)	23.3 (73.9)	18.6 (65.5)	18.0 (64.4)	20.7 (69.3)	24.2 (75.6)	29.1 (84.4)	33.3 (91.9)	36.5 (97.7)	40.9 (105.6)
Mean daily maximum °C (°F)	24.5 (76.1)	24.7 (76.5)	23.0 (73.4)	20.2 (68.4)	17.0 (62.6)	14.5 (58.1)	13.9 (57.0)	14.9 (58.8)	16.5 (61.7)	18.7 (65.7)	20.7 (69.3)	22.8 (73.0)	19.3 (66.7)
Daily mean °C (°F)	18.8 (65.8)	19.1 (66.4)	17.5 (63.5)	14.9 (58.8)	12.4 (54.3)	10.4 (50.7)	9.7 (49.5)	10.4 (50.7)	11.6 (52.9)	13.2 (55.8)	15.1 (59.2)	16.9 (62.4)	14.2 (57.5)
Mean daily minimum °C (°F)	13.0 (55.4)	13.5 (56.3)	12.0 (53.6)	9.5 (49.1)	7.8 (46.0)	6.3 (43.3)	5.4 (41.7)	5.8 (42.4)	6.6 (43.9)	7.6 (45.7)	9.5 (49.1)	10.9 (51.6)	9.0 (48.2)
Mean minimum °C (°F)	7.2 (45.0)	8.0 (46.4)	6.7 (44.1)	4.3 (39.7)	2.0 (35.6)	−0.3 (31.5)	−0.3 (31.5)	0.5 (32.9)	1.7 (35.1)	2.2 (36.0)	4.0 (39.2)	5.5 (41.9)	−1.2 (29.8)
Record low °C (°F)	4.5 (40.1)	5.0 (41.0)	2.2 (36.0)	1.4 (34.5)	0.0 (32.0)	−3.1 (26.4)	−4.3 (24.3)	−2.1 (28.2)	−0.6 (30.9)	−1.3 (29.7)	1.0 (33.8)	3.0 (37.4)	−4.3 (24.3)
Average rainfall mm (inches)	37.3 (1.47)	31.5 (1.24)	32.0 (1.26)	45.2 (1.78)	46.5 (1.83)	40.4 (1.59)	49.2 (1.94)	49.1 (1.93)	49.7 (1.96)	51.3 (2.02)	52.8 (2.08)	40.1 (1.58)	525.2 (20.68)
Average rainy days (≥ 0.2 mm)	7.0	5.8	8.2	11.9	13.0	15.0	16.8	16.7	16.0	13.5	10.3	9.0	143.2
Average afternoon relative humidity (%)	55	55	54	57	65	70	68	64	63	60	59	55	60
Source: Bureau of Meteorology (extremes include nearby stations)

== Economy ==
Unemployment rate in the Geelong labour market region since 1998

More than 10,000 businesses employ over 80,000 people in the Geelong region, with manufacturing and processing industries providing around 15,000 jobs, followed by 13,000 in retail, and 8,000 in health and community services.

In 2020, the Committee for Geelong published a research paper Resilient Geelong which tracks the Geelong economy over several decades. Written Deakin University's Prof Louise Johnson, Resilient Geelong makes a series of recommendations for the future of Geelong.

Geelong's major employers were the Ford engine plant in Norlane (closed in 2016), aircraft maintenance at Avalon Airport, the head office of retail chain Target Australia (until 2018), the Bartter (Steggles) chicken processing plant, and the Viva Energy (former Shell) oil refinery at Corio. GMHBA, a health insurance company, is headquartered in Geelong.

The Geelong region attracted over 6 million tourists during 2001. Major tourist attractions include the Waterfront Geelong precinct and Eastern Beach on the shores of Corio Bay, and the National Wool Museum in the city, Buckley Falls, and more than 30 historical buildings listed on the Victorian Heritage Register. The Geelong area hosts regular international events which are also tourist drawcards, including the Australian International Airshow.

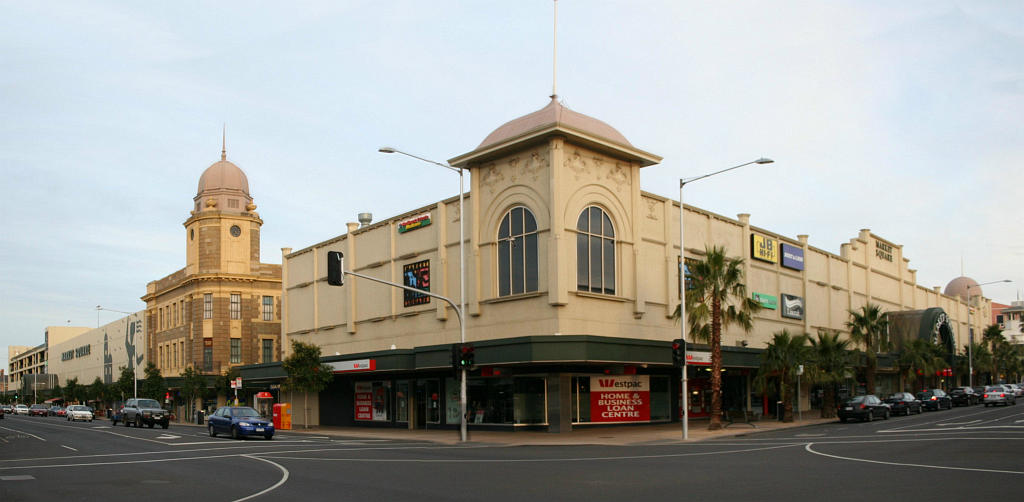
Market Square Shopping Centre, 2007

Geelong has a number of shopping precincts in the CBD and surrounding suburbs. The two main shopping centres are located in the CBD, Westfield Geelong and Market Square, with smaller centres in the suburbs including Belmont Village and Waurn Ponds Shopping Centre in the south, Bellarine Village in Newcomb in the east, and Corio Shopping Centre in the north. The opening of the major shopping centres has caused a decline in strip shopping on Moorabool Street, with many empty shops and few customers. Geelong is also home to Mitre 10's largest franchisee – Fagg's – operating five stores across the town and employing over 160 people.

These major research laboratories are located in the Geelong area: the CSIRO Australian Animal Health Laboratory in East Geelong, CSIRO Division of Textiles and Fibres Technology in Belmont, and the Marine and Freshwater Resources Institute at Queenscliff.

The scheduled closure of Ford's Australian manufacturing base in 2016 was confirmed in late May 2013. Headquartered in the Victorian suburb of Broadmeadows, the company had registered losses of AU$600 million over the five years prior to the announcement. It was noted that the corporate fleet and government sales that accounted for two-thirds of large, local car sales in Australia were insufficient to keep Ford's products profitable and viable in Australia.

Following the decision by Shell to close its Geelong refinery in April 2013, a third consecutive annual loss was recorded for Shell's Australian refining and fuel marketing assets. Revealed in June 2013, the writedown is worth AU$203 million, and was preceded by a $638 million writedown in 2012 and a $407 million writedown in 2011 after the closure of the Clyde Refinery in Sydney. Eventually, Shell sold the refinery to a subsidiary of oil trader Vitol in August 2014.

In April 2016 Target announced that it would be moving its headquarters out of North Geelong to Williams Landing in Melbourne's west.

== Demographics ==
Population over time
1841	454
1846	2,065
1851	8,291
1854	20,115
1861	22,929
1891	17,445
1901	25,017
1907	28,021
1921	31,689
1933	39,223
1946	51,000
1954	72,995
1961	91,666
1966	105,059
1976	122,080
1981	141,279
1988	146,349
2006	160,991
2009	179,971
2010	184,583

As of the 2006 census, 160,000 people resided in 68,000 households. The median age of persons in Geelong was 37 years. About 19.4% of the population of Geelong were children aged between 0–14 years, and 26.6% were persons aged 55 years and over. Each dwelling is on average occupied by 2.59 persons, slightly lower than the state and national averages. The median household income was $901 per week, $121 less than the state average, partly due to higher reliance on manufacturing for employment. The population of Geelong grew by 2500 people each year, and the City of Greater Geelong had the highest rate of building activity in Victoria outside metropolitan Melbourne.

About 78.4% of people from Geelong are Australian-born, with the most common overseas birthplaces being: England (3.6%), Italy (1.1%), Croatia (1.0%), the Netherlands (0.9%), and Scotland (0.8%). Around 14.2% of households speak a language other than English in the home. Notable ethnic groups in the city are the Croatian community, who first came to the city in the 1850s and with migration since World War II are now the largest Croatian community in Australia, and the German settlers who founded Germantown (now Grovedale) in 1849 to escape repression in Prussia for their Lutheran faith. The 2006 census found the most common religious affiliation in Geelong was Catholicism at 29.4%. St. Mary of the Angels Basilica is the largest congregation in the city. Other affiliations of resident of Geelong include no religion 20.5%, Anglican 14.6%, Uniting Church 7.9%, and Presbyterian and Reformed at 4.3%. The city has a large number of traditional Christian churches, as well as Orthodox Christian churches in the northern suburbs.

As of 2021, languages spoken at home (excluding English) of over 100 speakers within the Greater Geelong region include (in order of most spoken): Mandarin (2,161 speakers; 0.8% of population), Punjabi (2,138; 0.8%), Italian (2,113; 0.8%), Croatian (1,984; 0.7%), Filipino/Tagalog (1,470; 0.5%), Macedonian (1,102; 0.4%), Greek (1,077; 0.4%), Hindi (965; 0.4%), Karen (914; 0.3%), Arabic (901; 0.3%), Vietnamese (897; 0.3%), Spanish (836; 0.3%), Serbian (836; 0.3%), Malayalam (782; 0.3%), Urdu (668; 0.2%), Hazaraghi (651; 0.2%), German (611; 0.3%), Telugu (589; 0.2%), Sinhalese (540; 0.2%), Cantonese (480; 0.2%), Persian (470; 0.2%), Tamil (462; 0.2%), French (450; 0.2%), Thai (436; 0.2%), Polish (430; 0.2%), Gujarati (406; 0.1%), Nepali (379; 0.1%), Dutch (379; 0.1%), Turkish (340; 0.1%), Russian (322; 0.1%), Japanese (285; 0.1%), Portuguese (267; 0.1%), Bosnian (251; 0.1%), Maltese (245; 0.1%), Swahili (243; 0.1%), Indonesian (234; 0.1%), Bengali (225; 0.1%), Ukrainian (224; 0.1%), Afrikaans (210; 0.1%), Korean (196; 0.1%), Dari (193; 0.1%), Hungarian (178; 0.1%), Pashto (147; 0.1%), Shona (130; <0.1%) and Slovene (118; <0.1%).

== Governance ==
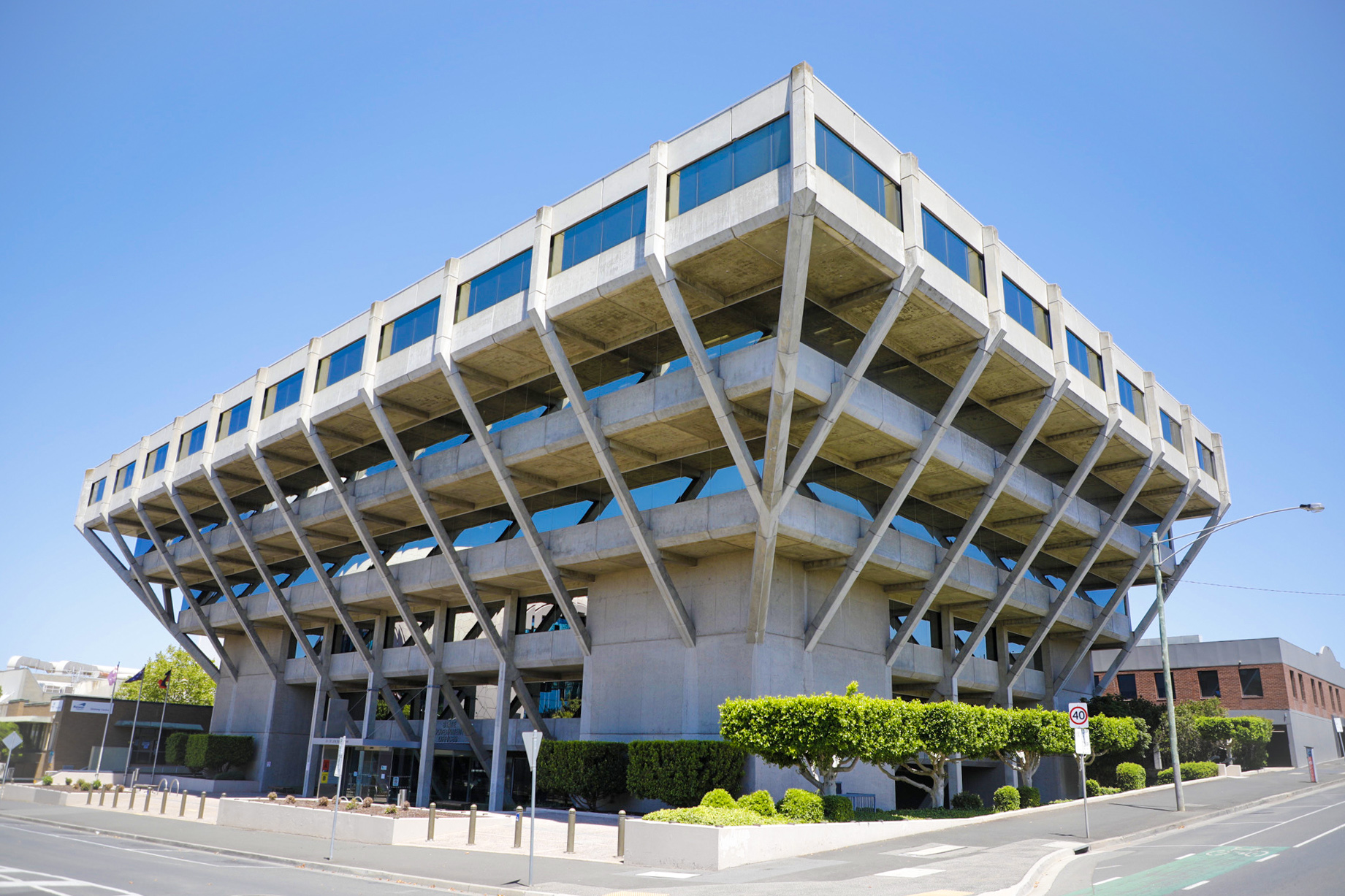
State Government office building, 2020

=== Local governance ===
In local government, the Geelong region is covered by the City of Greater Geelong. The council was created in 1993 as an amalgamation of a number of other municipalities in the region, with the council chambers located at the Geelong City Hall in central Geelong. The city is made up of four wards - Brownbill (central Geelong and inner suburbs), Bellarine, Kardinia (southern Geelong, south of the Barwon River), and Windermere (northern suburbs). Brownbill, Kardinia, and Bellarine are each represented by three councillors, whereas Windermere is represented by two.

From 2012 to 2016, the Mayor of Geelong was directly elected by the public to a four-year term. Entrepreneur and former paparazzo Darryn Lyons held this position from 2013 to 2016.

On 16 April 2016, the Victorian Government dismissed the Mayor and Councillors of the Greater Geelong City Council, following a Commission of Inquiry which found that the council is riven with conflict, unable to manage Geelong's economic challenges, has dysfunctional leadership, and has a culture of bullying. The government appointed administrators to run the council until council elections were held in 2017. In 2023, the Victorian Government announced that it would appoint monitors to oversee the appointment of a new CEO.

=== State politics ===
In state politics, the Legislative Assembly districts of Geelong, South Barwon, Lara, and Bellarine cover the Geelong area. After the 2022 Victorian Election, all four of these electorates are held by the Australian Labor Party. Lara and Geelong are safe Labor seats with South Barwon increasing its margin and Bellarine more marginal.

On 12 February 2020, Minister for Planning Richard Wynn established Geelong Authority to advise on strategies to attract investment to central Geelong and on major planning applications to help create jobs and drive growth in Geelong. The committee is chaired by Diana Taylor (lawyer) and consists of Mark Edmonds (former Chairman of Geelong Chamber of Commerce), Aamir Qutub (CEO of Enterprise Monkey), Jill Smith (former General Manager of Geelong Arts Centre), and Rory Costelloe (Executive Director of Villawood Properties) and Dr Sarah Leach.

=== Federal politics ===
In federal politics, the House of Representatives seats – the Division of Corio and Division of Corangamite cover the Geelong region. Corio roughly covers the northern half of Geelong and has been a safe Australian Labor Party seat since the 1970s, but was previously the seat of Richard Casey, a leading conservative Cabinet member in the 1930s and later Governor-General, as well as Hubert Opperman, a former cycling champion and a prominent minister in the 1960s. It was also the seat of Gordon Scholes, who was Speaker during the Whitlam government. Corio has been held by Deputy Prime Minister Richard Marles, first elected in 2007.

Corangamite, which includes roughly the southern half of Geelong and the Bellarine Peninsula, was traditionally safe for the Liberal Party, but become more marginal in recent years due to demographic changes, and redistributions which led to it including more of suburban Geelong. Corangamite had been a safe seat for the Liberal Party and its predecessors from the 1930s through the 2000s. Future Prime Minister of Australia James Scullin served one term in this seat in the 1910s. It was won by the Australian Labor Party at the 2019 federal election and again in 2022 by Libby Coker where the margin was increased.

== Culture ==
=== Events and festivals ===
The Royal Geelong Show is held each year at the Geelong Showgrounds. Other events include Pako Festa (held annually in February), Gala Day Parade (annual event that celebrated its 96th year in 2012) and Family Fun Day (held annually as part of the Gala Day celebrations), and the Geelong Heritage Festival that is run by the local branch of the National Trust. The Gala Day Parade was axed in 2023.

Geelong hosts Victoria's only international photographic salon "VIGEX" every two years. VIGEX is an acronym for "VIctoria Geelong EXhibition" and the inaugural event was held in 1980. The Australian Photographic Society, the world governing body of exhibition photography the International Federation of Photographic Art, and the Victorian Association of Photographic Societies are patrons of the biennial photographic salon.

Geelong's History is preserved through both the Geelong Historical Society, and the associated Geelong Heritage Centre, housed in the regional library building opened in 2015.

Now defunct, Geelong hosted a digital conference Pivot Summit which was headlined by Apple Co-founder Steve Wozniak in 2017.

=== Arts and entertainment ===
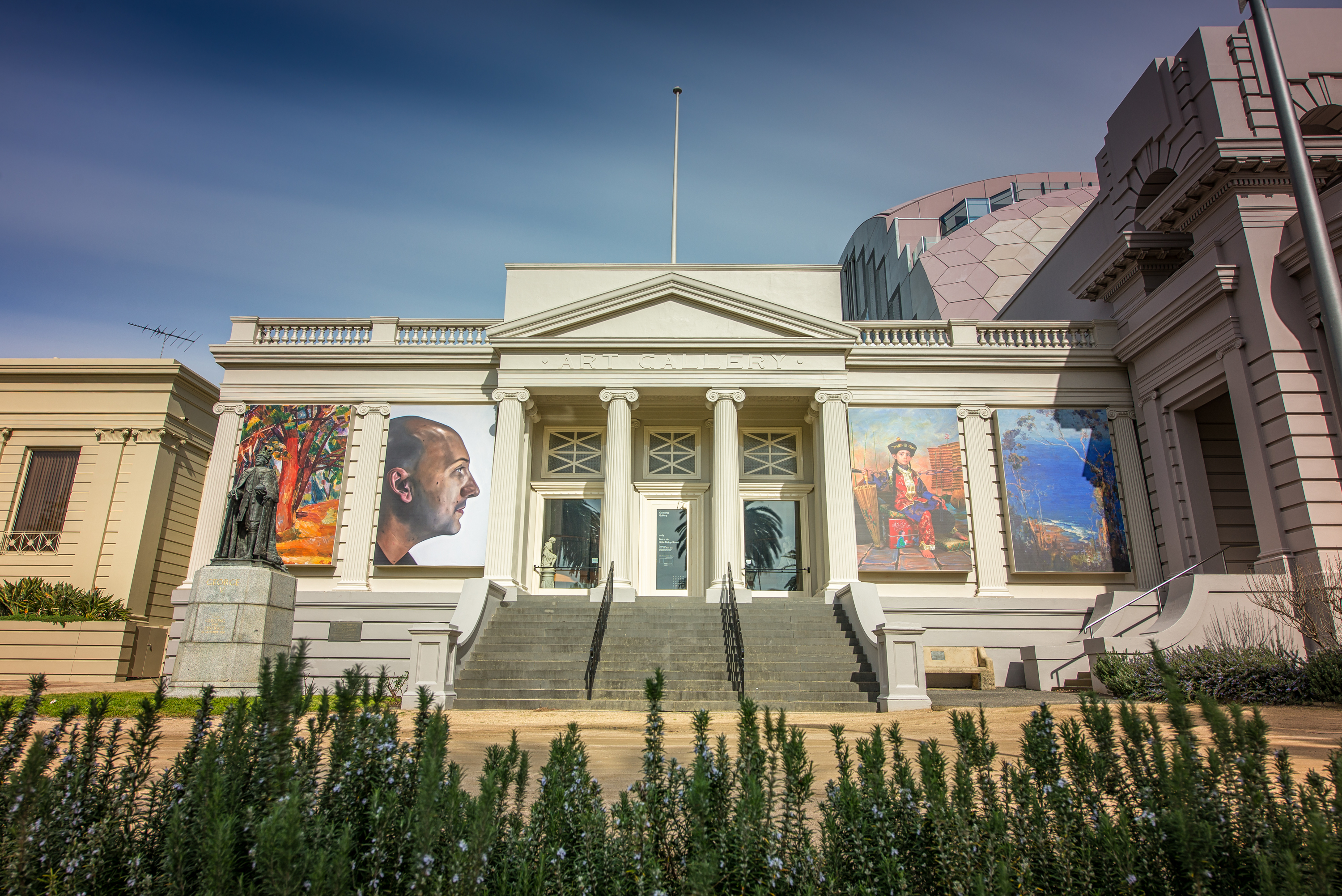
Geelong Art Gallery, 2016

Recognising a long history in design excellence, Geelong was designated as a UNESCO Creative City of Design in 2017.

Geelong is home to a number of pubs, nightclubs, and live-music venues. The city is also the birthplace or starting point for a number of notable Australian bands and musicians, such as Barry Crocker, Gyan Evans, Magic Dirt, Jeff Lang, Denis Walter, Chrissy Amphlett, and Helen Garner.

Geelong also hosts music festivals such as the Meredith Music Festival, Offshore Festival, Poppykettle Festival, and National Celtic Festival.

The city's prominent cultural venues are the Geelong Performing Arts Centre (commonly known as "GPAC"), the 1500-seat Costa Hall auditorium, and the Geelong Art Gallery.

Based in Geelong, Back to Back Theatre is a globally renowned, contemporary Australian theatre companies engaging with disability on stage. With work produced by the company, Back to Back Theatre explores questions about politics, ethics, and philosophy in humanity and tours nationally and globally. In 2022, Back to Back Theatre was awarded the $300,000 International Ibsen Award.

Local community-led, not-for-profit Creative Geelong Inc was established in 2015 to support local creatives and highlight the opportunities for creative industries practitioners in the region. In 2017, Creative Geelong partnered with Deakin University to crowdfund and produce three documentaries about Geelong's transformation from a heavy manufacturing hub to a creative destination. Hubcaps to Creative Hubs series showcase three locations in Geelong including the Federal Woollen Mills, RS&S Woollen Mills, and the Fyansford Paper Mills and tells the story of their industrial past and new purpose as creative hot spots.

=== Media ===
The Geelong Advertiser, the oldest newspaper title in Victoria and the second-oldest in Australia, was established in 1840. The free Geelong Independent and Geelong News are the city's other major newspapers.

Geelong is part of the Melbourne television licence area, and receives all of the free-to-air stations from Melbourne, including ABC, SBS, Seven, Nine, Ten, and the community channel C31. In some elevated areas of Geelong it is also possible to pick up UHF Ballarat channels but a high-gain antenna and amplifier must be used. The Geelong region also receives cable and satellite television services through pay television operators Foxtel and Neighbourhood Cable.

The local radio stations are K-Rock (rock and pop music), 3GL (classic hits), Rhema FM (now 96three FM) (Christian community station), Hot Country Radio (country music station), The Pulse (community station), 3GPH (radio reading service), and Bay FM (adult contemporary music). The transmitters for K-Rock, The Pulse, Rhema FM, and Bay FM are located at a shared transmitter site on Mount Bellarine, near Drysdale. The transmitter for 3GL is located at a transmitter site in Leopold on 1341 AM, with low-power FM translators also on-air throughout the region between 87.6-88.0 FM, with another servicing Colac on 88.0 FM. Most Melbourne-based AM and FM radio stations can also be received clearly in the Geelong region. DAB+ radio services direct from Melbourne can also be received in most areas of Geelong.

=== Sport ===
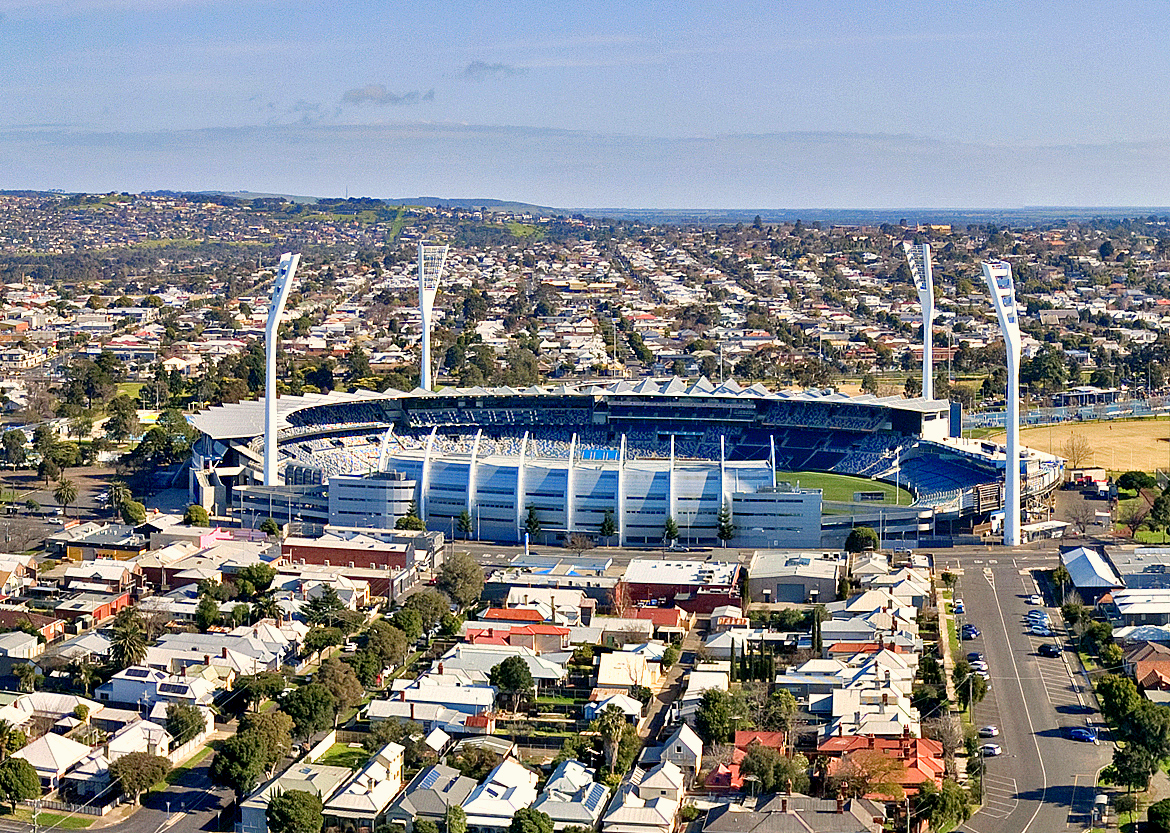
Aerial view of Kardinia Park, 2018

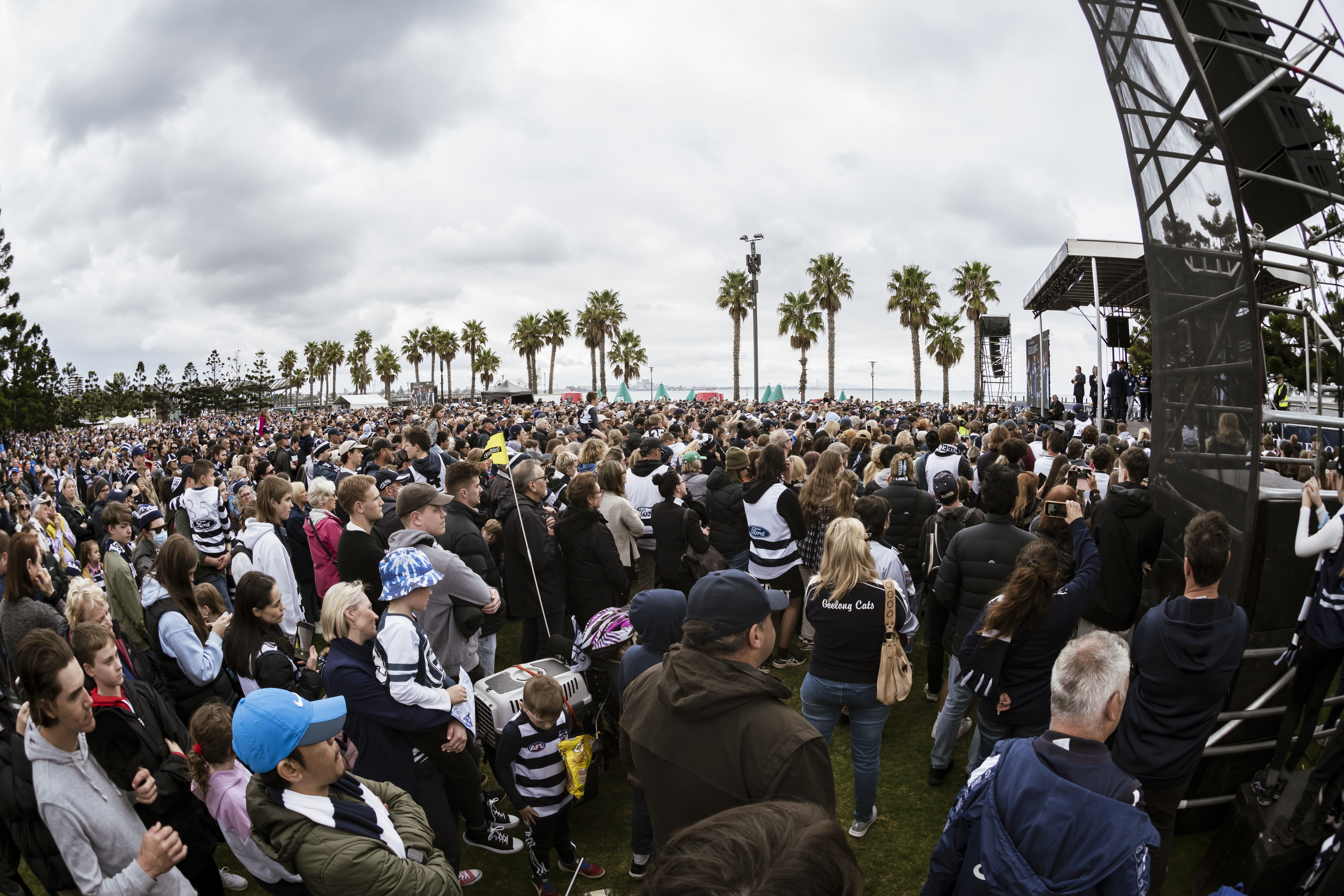
Street parade celebrating the Geelong Football Club winning the 2022 AFL Grand Final

Established in 1859, the Geelong Football Club is the second-oldest club in the Australian Football League (AFL) and one of the world's oldest football clubs. Its home ground is Kardinia Park stadium. With more than 80,000 members and an all-time average home game attendance at Kardinia Park of over 20,000 a match, it has the highest membership and average attendance for a non-capital city based football club in Australia. It also fields a reserves side in the Victorian Football League, and three independent football leagues run in the area: the Geelong Football League, the Geelong & District Football League, and the Bellarine Football League.

The Geelong Arena in North Geelong is the home of the Geelong Supercats basketball team, and was used for basketball games during the 2006 Commonwealth Games. The Geelong Basketball and Netball Centre was formerly the home to another basketball team from the region, the Corio Bay Stingrays. The city co-hosted the 2003 FIBA Oceania Championship, at which Australia's national basketball team won the gold medal.

Soccer in Geelong and the various local competitions are administered by Football Victoria Geelong. North Geelong Warriors FC are the region's highest ranked men's soccer club, playing in the National Premier Leagues Victoria competition. The club played in the Victorian Premier League from 1992 to 1997 and in the top tier of the NPL in 2015. Geelong Galaxy are the highest ranked women's team playing in the VPL competition. Other soccer clubs include Northern based Geelong Rangers FC, Geelong SC, Corio SC, Lara United FC, and Southern based Surf Coast SC.

Geelong has a horse-racing club, the Geelong Racing Club, which schedules about 22 race meetings a year, including the Geelong Cup meeting in October. The Geelong Cup was first run in 1872, and is considered one of the most reliable guides to the result of the Melbourne Cup. It also has a picnic horse-racing club, Geelong St Patricks Racing Club, which holds its one race meeting a year in February.

Geelong Harness Racing Club conducts regular meetings at its racetrack at Corio, and the Geelong Greyhound Racing Club holds regular meetings.

Founded in 1882, the Geelong Lawn Tennis Club has 27 tennis courts and plays host to a number of tennis tournaments including the Davis Cup tie between Australia and China in 2012.

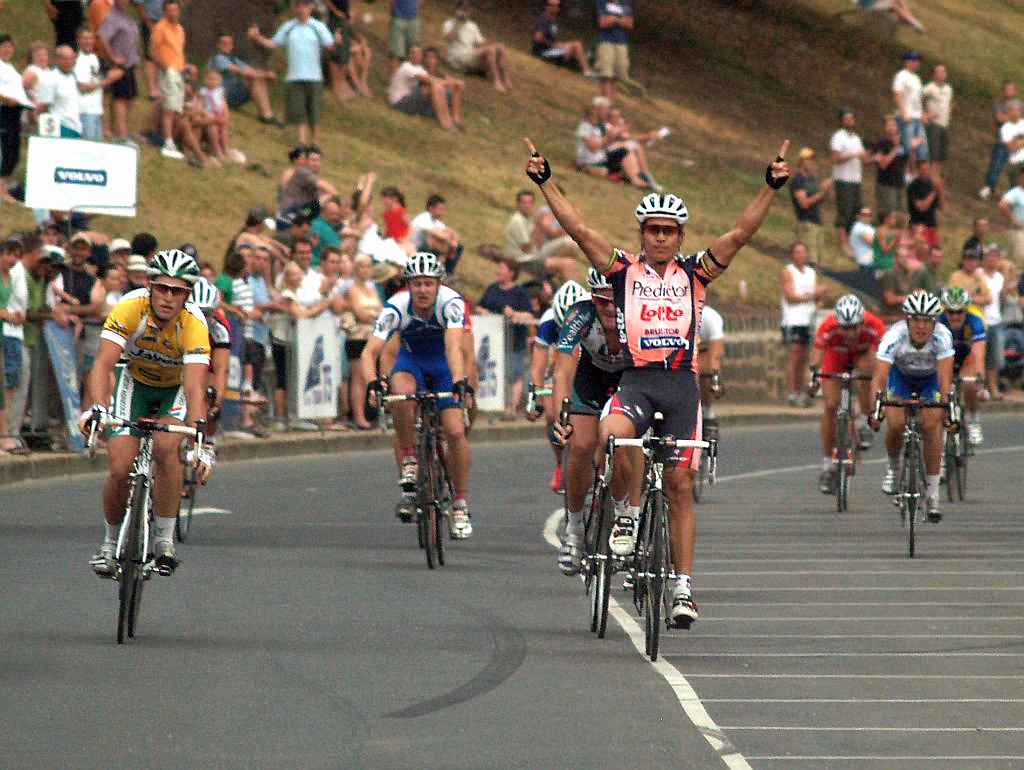
2007 Bay Classic Series at Eastern Beach

The Eastern Beach foreshore and nearby Eastern Gardens regularly host internationally televised triathlons, and annual sports car and racing car events such as the Geelong Speed Trials.

Corio Bay is also host to many sailing and yachting events. Geelong also has many golf courses, sporting and recreation ovals, and playing fields, as well as facilities for water skiing, rowing, fishing, hiking, and greyhound and harness racing. Geelong Athletics holds competitions during both the summer and winter, including high-profile events such as Victorian and sometimes national and international track and field meets.

Geelong is home to Australia's largest indoor skate park, and has "more skate parks per capita than any other municipality in Australia."

Geelong is also the birthplace of Bev Francis, an IFBB professional Australian female bodybuilder, powerlifter, and national shot put champion.

The Cadel Evans Great Ocean Road Race, named in honour of the Tour de France winner and 2009 World Champion starts in the city. It then goes through Barwon Heads on the Bellarine Peninsula, passing by the famous surf beach of Bells Beach in Surf Coast Shire and continuing along the Great Ocean Road. The race then heads via rolling hills back to Geelong for three circuits of the city before a waterfront finish. The race generally suits puncheurs who are capable of getting into breakaways and can easily climb short, steep hills.

The city's Kardinia Park Stadium hosted the first match of the 2022 Men's T20 cricket World Cup. Along with other cities in regional Victoria, Geelong was scheduled host the 2026 Commonwealth Games until they were cancelled.

Football clubs based in the Geelong area. Orange represents clubs in the Geelong & District Football Netball League, red teams in the Geelong Football Netball League, and yellow teams in the Bellarine Football Netball League.

== Public services ==
=== Education ===
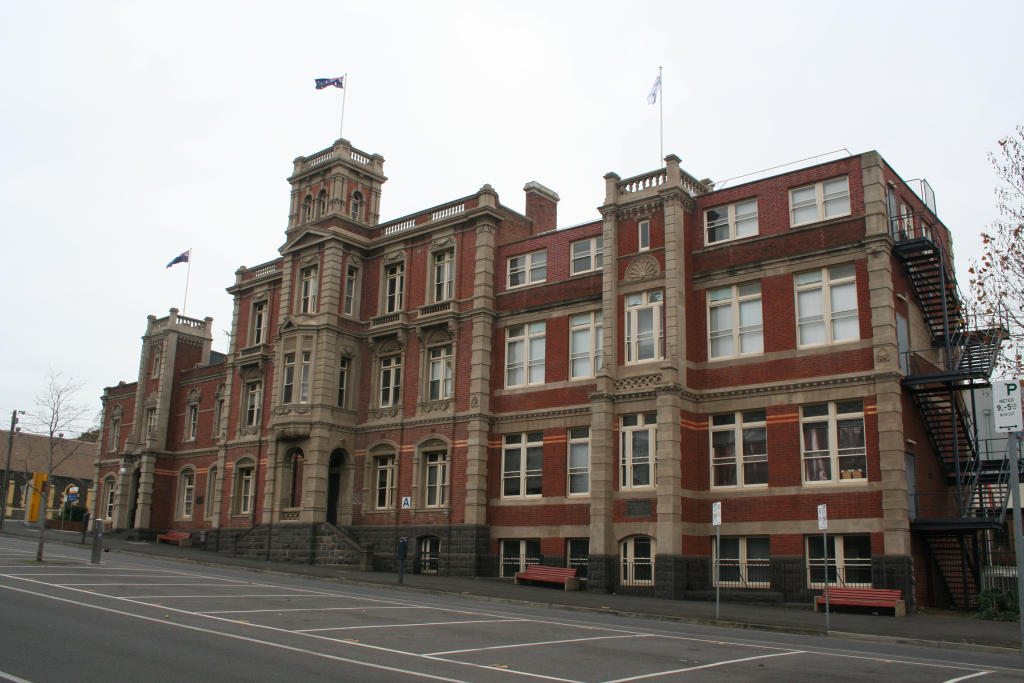
The Gordon Institute of TAFE building in Fenwick Street 2007

Geelong is served by a number of public and private schools that cater to local and overseas students. Over 40,000 primary and secondary students are enrolled in schools in Geelong, with another 27,000 students enrolled in tertiary and further education programs. The first schools in Geelong were established when the town was settled from the 1850s, among them were the historic private schools The Geelong College and Geelong Grammar School.

Geelong is also home to the oldest state secondary school in Victoria, Geelong High School (est. 1910), which has been serving the community for over 100 years.

The Gordon Memorial Technical College opened in 1888, and is known today as the Gordon Institute of TAFE. In 1976, the Gordon Institute was divided into two parts, with academic courses becoming part of the newly formed Deakin University based at the Waurn Ponds campus. Deakin University enrolled its first students at its Waurn Ponds campus in 1977. Today, the university is located on a 365 ha (900-acre) site at Waurn Ponds and has over 1,000 staff members and over 4,000 on-campus students. The university also has a campus located on the waterfront of Corio Bay in the Geelong CBD, a campus in Burwood, Melbourne, and a campus in Warrnambool, in Western Victoria. From 2008 the campus at Waurn Ponds also has been home to Victoria's first regional medical school.

=== Health ===
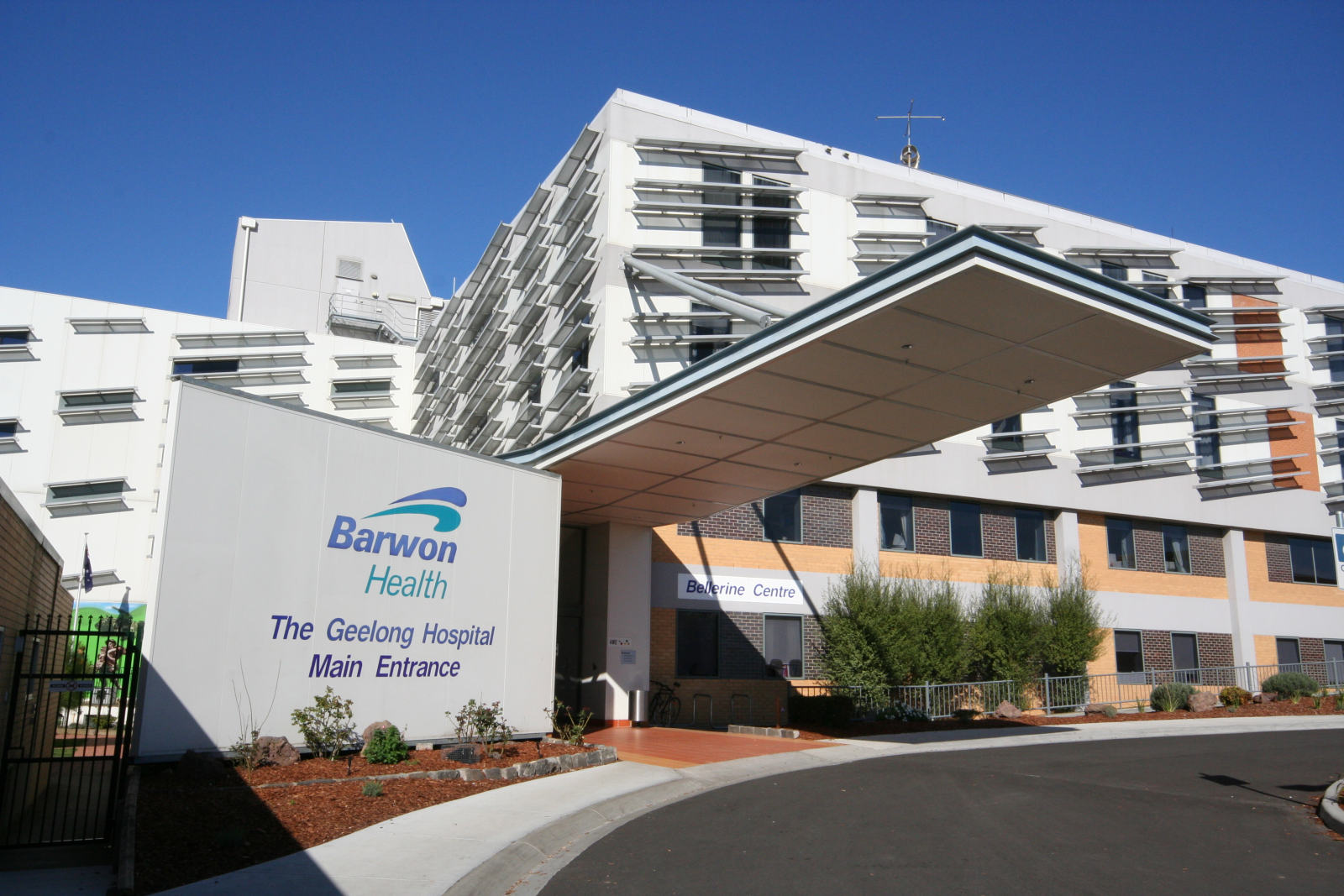
Main entrance of Geelong Hospital (now University Hopital Geelong), 2007

The major public health service is Barwon Health, which operates 21 separate health sites including University Hospital Geelong on Ryrie Street, and the McKellar Centre on Ballarat Road. Barwon Health services the entire region. The largest private hospital is the nearby St John of God Health Care centre on Myers Street. Prominent healthcare services include the Epworth Hospital located at 1 Epworth Place, Waurn Ponds VIC 3216., and Geelong Health (Geelong West).

=== Utilities ===
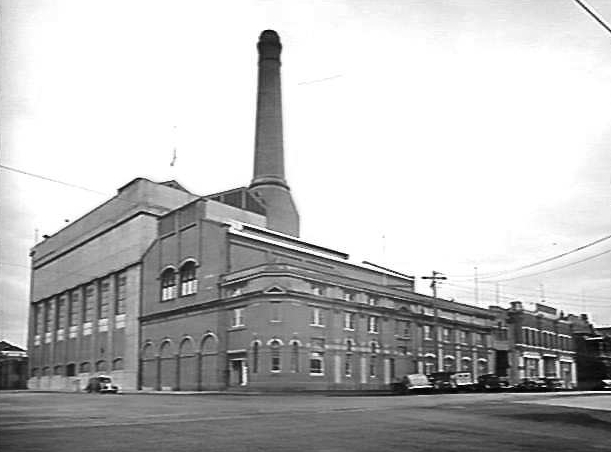
The former Geelong A power station, 1948

Water storage and supply in Geelong is managed by Barwon Water, a Victoria government-owned urban water corporation. Geelong is supplied with water from three river systems: the Barwon, the East Moorabool, and the West Moorabool Rivers. The catchment areas are the Brisbane Ranges to Geelong's north-west, and the Otway Ranges to the south-west. The first water supplies to Geelong were from the Stony Creek reservoirs near Steiglitz, but, as of 2010, Geelong, together with Ballarat, consumes about 70% of the Moorabool River's water flow. Sewage from Geelong and district is treated at the Black Rock Treatment Plant at Breamlea and then discharged into Bass Strait.

Geelong was first supplied with electricity in 1902 when the Geelong Power Station opened on the corner of Yarra and Brougham Streets. Later known as Geelong A, the power station was rebuilt in 1920 to increase its capacity, with the station operating until 1961. In 1936, Geelong was connected to the state electrical grid. The Geelong B power station at North Geelong opened in 1954, and was closed in 1970 due to the increasing efficiency of the power stations in the Latrobe Valley.

The supply of piped coal gas was started in 1860 by the Geelong Gas Company. The rail-served gasworks were located in North Geelong next to the North Geelong railway station. Geelong was converted to natural gas in 1971, with the Geelong Gas Company being taken over by the Gas and Fuel Corporation of Victoria on 30 June 1971.

== Transport ==
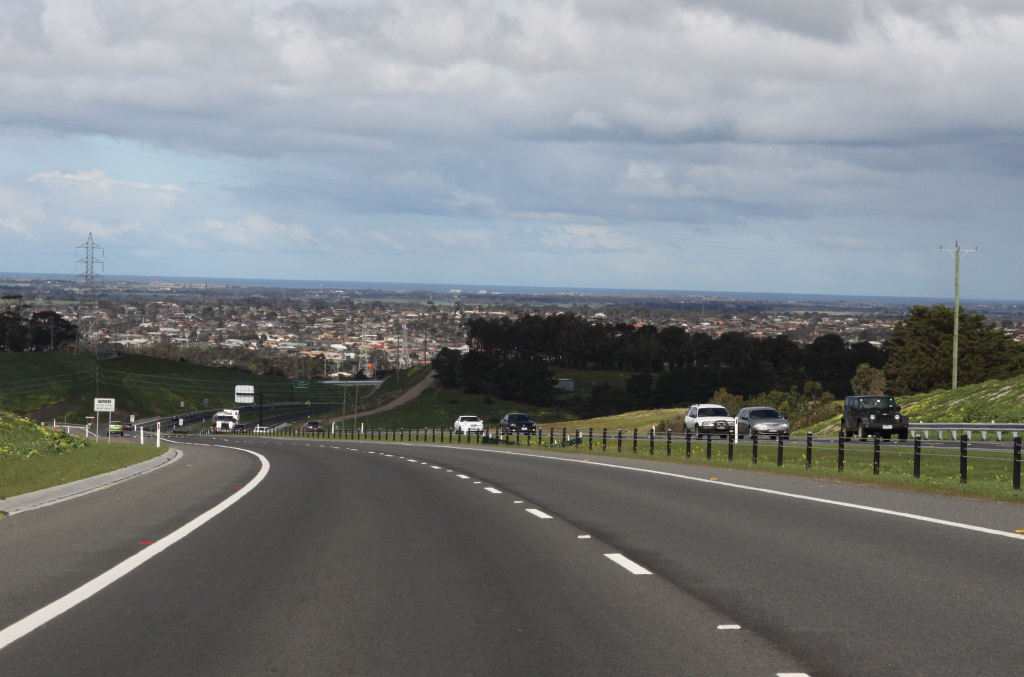
The Geelong Ring Road, looking south towards suburban Waurn Ponds, 2009

The main form of transportation in Geelong is the automobile. Geelong is well-connected by roads to all of south-west Victoria, to Melbourne by a major-arterial the Princes Freeway (M1) with three or four lanes in each direction, to Warrnambool by the Princes Highway (A1), the Bellarine Peninsula by the Bellarine Highway (B110), Ballarat by the Midland Highway (A300), and to Hamilton by the Hamilton Highway (B140). The $380 million Geelong Ring Road (an extension of the Princes Freeway) bypasses the greater Geelong urban area exiting the Princes Highway near Corio to rejoin the highway at Waurn Ponds. The Lewis Bandt Bridge, named in honour of the Ford Australia engineer who is credited as the inventor of the ute (1934), in Geelong is a feature of the new road.

=== Avalon Airport ===
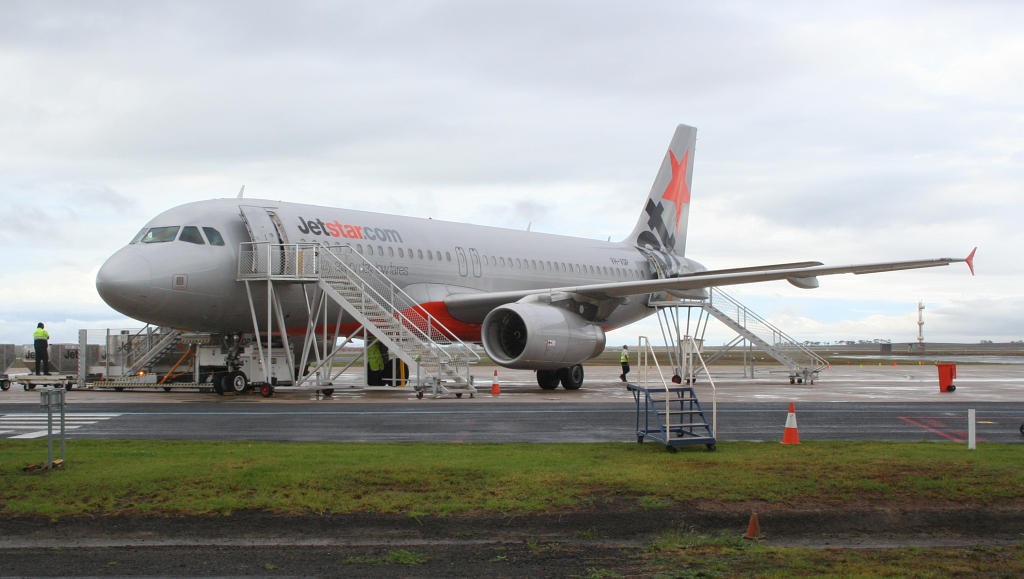
Jetstar aircraft at Avalon Airport, 2007

Avalon Airport is located about 15 km (9.3 mi) to the north-east of the city of Geelong in the suburb of Avalon. It was established in 1953 for the production of military aircraft. It was also used for the repair of commercial aircraft, and for pilot training. Avalon Airport has also been home to low-cost airline Jetstar since 2004. Flights to Sydney use the airport and in June 2015, Jetstar announced it would fly to the Gold Coast daily from Avalon Airport commencing October 2015. Avalon Airport is the venue for "Thunder Down Under" Australian International Airshow every other year.

There have been a few attempts to institute international flights from the airport. AirAsia X provided flights to and from Kuala Lumpur and Citilink to Denpasar, but they were cancelled during the COVID-19 pandemic.

=== Rail ===
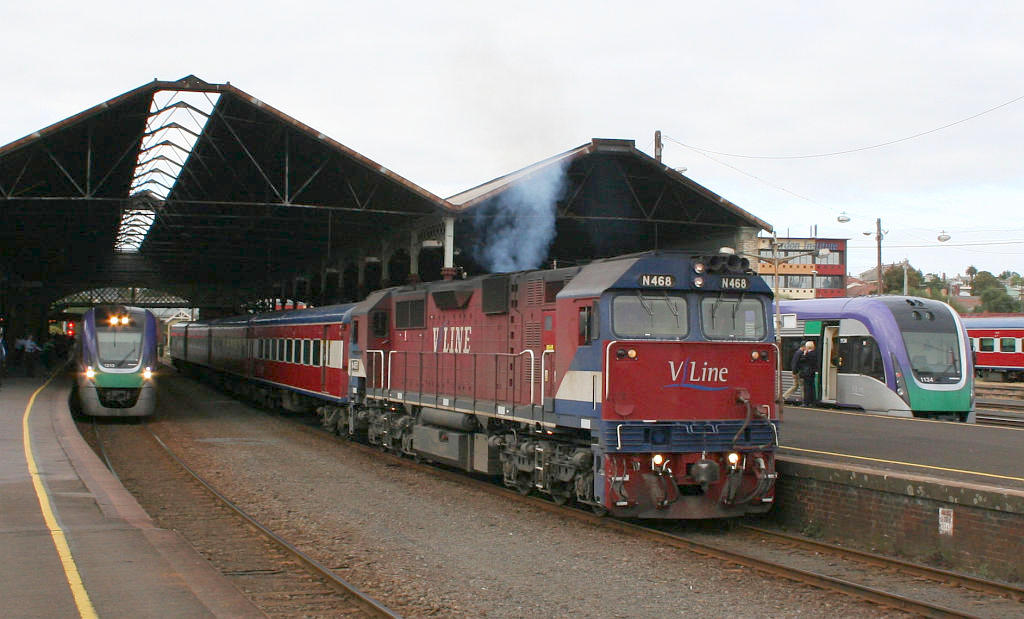
V/Line passenger trains at Geelong railway station, 2006

Geelong is a major hub for rail transport in Victoria, having frequent services to and from Melbourne, and being at the junction of the Port Fairy, Western standard gauge, and the Geelong-Ballarat (freight only) lines. Eight passenger railway stations are in the urban area, all along the Warrnambool line and served by V/Line trains. The Geelong line provides passenger services to Melbourne in the off-peak with trains departing Geelong every 20 minutes on weekdays, with more frequent services at peak times. According to V/Line, the Geelong line carries more passengers than any other regional rail line in Australia. None of the lines are electrified and all trains servicing Geelong are diesel powered.

Geelong's currently operating stations include Little River, Lara, Corio, North Shore, North Geelong, Geelong, South Geelong, Marshall, and Waurn Ponds.

In the past, a rail line connected Geelong city to the Bellarine Peninsula through to Queenscliff. Regular rail passenger services ceased in 1931, although summer Sunday excursion trains ran until the 1970s. The line was closed in 1976. The Bellarine Railway now operates on a section of the line between Drysdale and Queenscliff as a tourist attraction.

Passenger services run to Warrnambool five times daily, connecting Geelong with Colac, Terang, and Camperdown. Journey Beyond's The Overland service between Melbourne and Adelaide stops at the standard-gauge platform provided at North Shore station. It runs two days a week. Freight trains also operate from Melbourne to Geelong serving local industries, as well as to Warrnambool and other western Victorian towns. The main Melbourne-Adelaide standard-gauge line is the main interstate freight route.

Victoria's electronic ticketing system, Myki, was implemented on rail services between Marshall and Melbourne on 29 July 2013.

The Victorian government is in the process of land acquisition and inspection for a potential Torquay rail line which would service both Torquay and the Armstrong Creek growth corridor.

=== Ports and ferry services ===
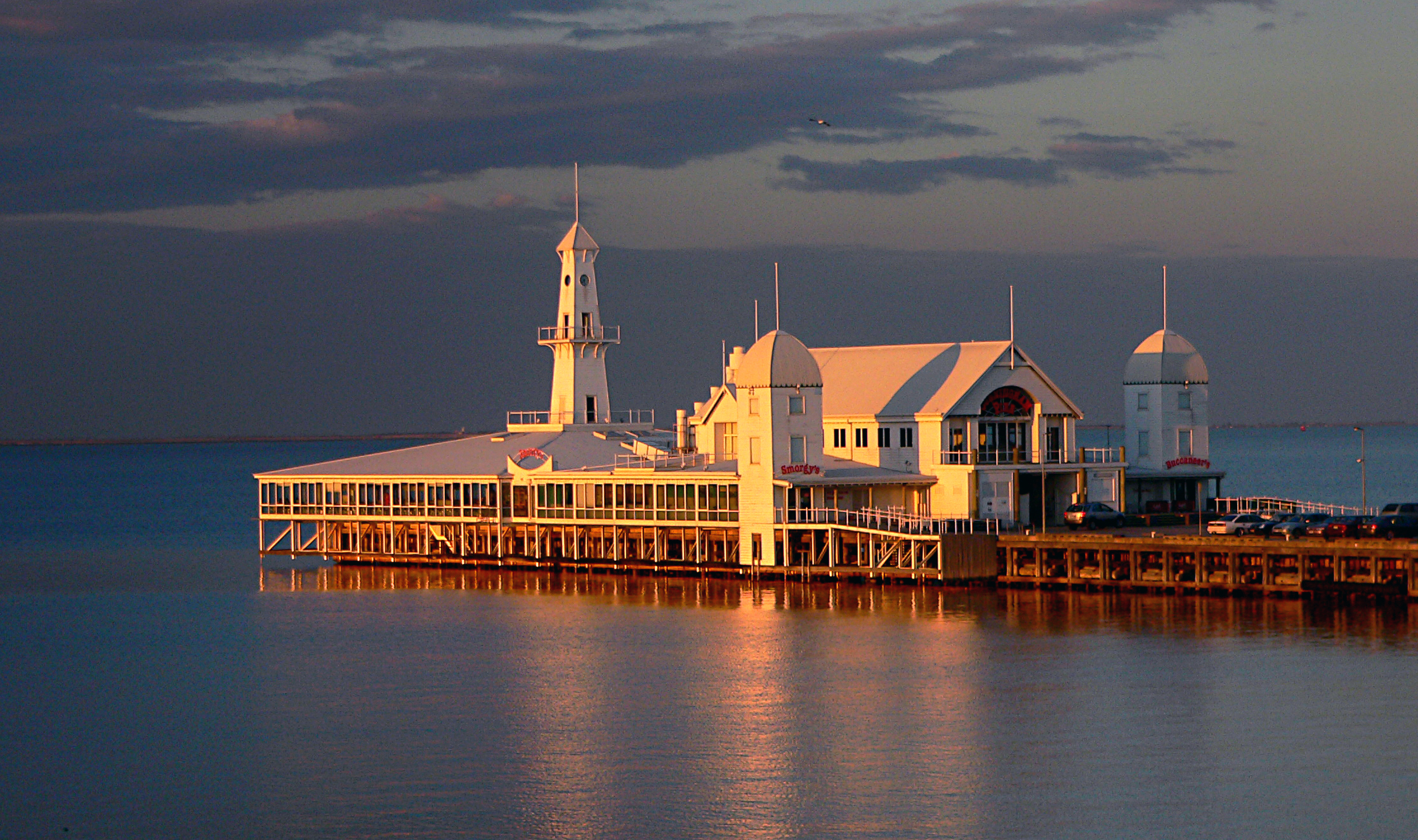
Cunningham Pier

The Port of Geelong is located on the shores of Corio Bay, and is the sixth-largest seaport in Australia by tonnage. Major commodities include crude oil and petroleum products, export grain, woodchips, alumina imports, and fertiliser. The Bellarine Peninsula has been linked to the Mornington Peninsula since 1987 by the Searoad ferry, which runs every hour using two roll-on/roll-off ferries between Queenscliff and Sorrento.

Port Phillip Ferries began operating twice-daily services between Portarlington and Melbourne Docklands in November 2016. Three years later overcrowding on trains led to a similar service being introduced from Geelong to Docklands. The services are popular with both tourists and commuters, providing an alternative access for Geelong and the Bellarine Peninsula to Melbourne. The 36-metre-long (118 ft) catamaran ferries seat over 400 passengers, provide a comfortable vantage point to enjoy the sights of Port Phillip. The introduction of the Portarlington service led to a major revamp of the local pier, with pier extensions and a protective rock wall installed.

On 23 October 2022 the Tasmanian ferry service, the Spirit of Tasmania, started operating from a new terminal in North Geelong rather than from Port Melbourne.

=== Bus and taxi ===
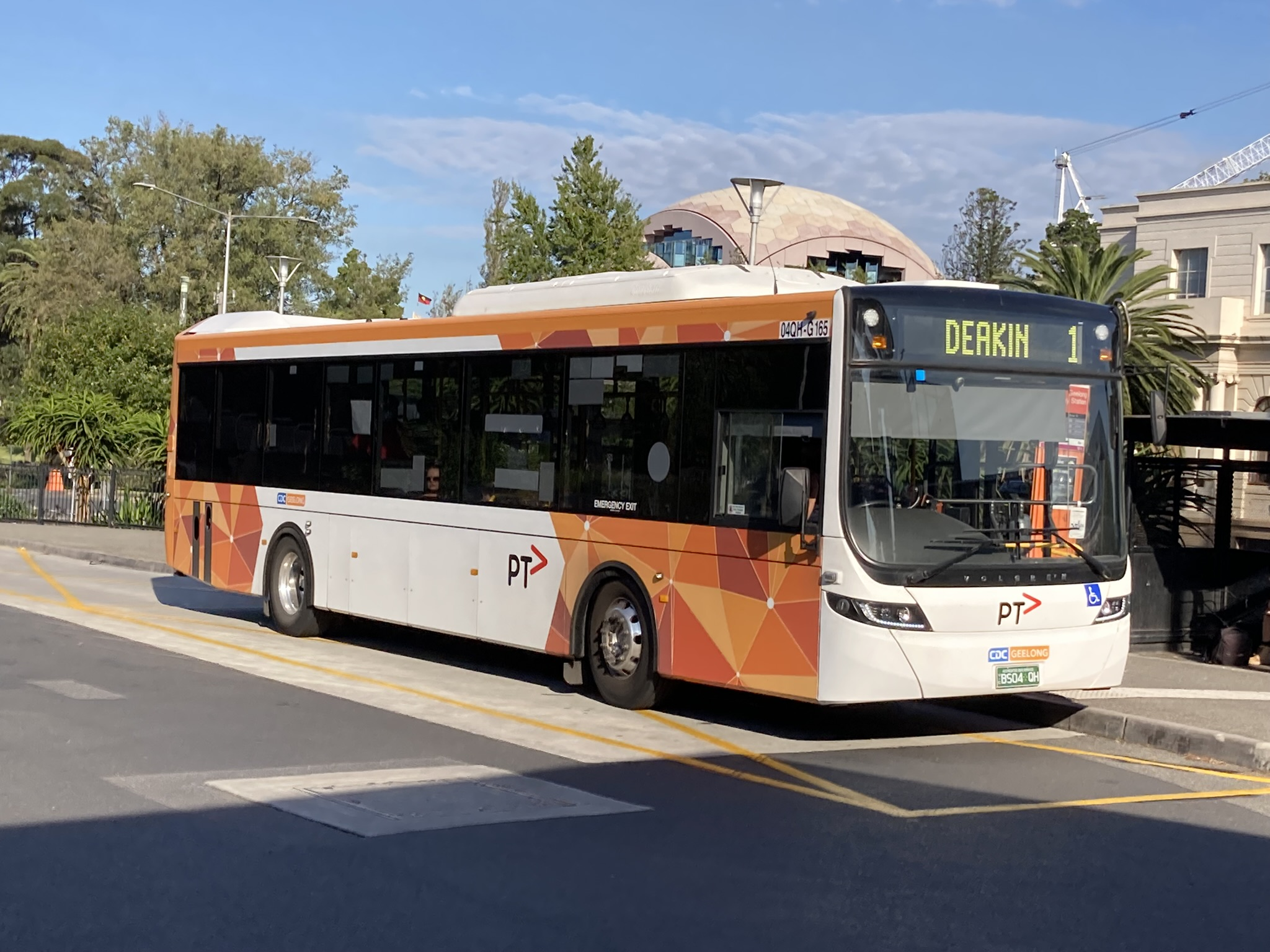
CDC Geelong bus at Geelong railway station, 2022

A bus network covering the city centre and most surrounding suburbs provides public transport. Until June 2015 they were operated under the umbrella of the Geelong Transit System. Public Transport Victoria contracts CDC Geelong and McHarry's Buslines to provide Geelong's bus services and bus services to Torquay and the Bellarine Peninsula. V/Line services link Geelong with Ballarat, Daylesford, Bendigo, Apollo Bay, the Great Ocean Road, the Twelve Apostles, and Warrnambool.

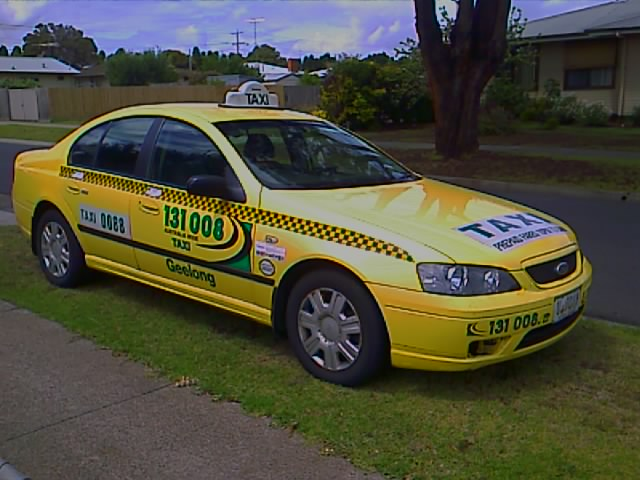
Taxi in Norlane

Taxi services in Geelong are provided by Geelong Taxi Network, a newly formed depot following the effective merger of Bay City Cabs and Geelong Radio Cabs in July 2007. The majority of the network covers the city and suburban areas of the city, with "urban" classification for the vehicles in use. The Bellarine Peninsula, and Torquay areas, although part of Geelong Taxi Network, are both covered by separate "country" classification taxis. Often, disputes occur in regards to different taxis from one licence area, picking up work from either of the other two licence areas, which is illegal in most circumstances under current taxi regulations in Victoria.

=== Cycling and walking ===
Geelong also has many kilometres of bicycle trails, including:

- Bay Trail, Corio Quay to Limeburners Point
- Barwon River trail – 20 km (12 mi) between Fyansford and South Geelong
- Bellarine Rail Trail is a 32 km (20 mi) path between South Geelong and Queenscliffe.
- Cowies Creek Trail
- Hovells Creek Trail
- Ted Wilson trail- Follows the Geelong Ring Road for 12 km (7.5 mi) between Corio to Hamlyn Heights
- Tom McKean Linear Park, Separation Street, North Geelong through to the Fyansford Cement Works
- Waurn Ponds trail offers follows over 6 km (3.7 mi) of the Waurn Ponds creek

== See also ==
- Geelong Field Naturalists Club
- List of cities in Australia#Victoria
- List of places of worship in the City of Greater Geelong
- List of pubs in the City of Greater Geelong
- List of Heritage listed buildings in Geelong
- Category:People from Geelong
- Geelong's Woolstores, 19th century
- Newcastle
- Wollongong
- Geelong depot
