= Geelong Independent =

The Geelong Independent is a local free weekly newspaper delivered to houses in the Geelong region in Victoria.

The newspaper was founded in 1986, and was started by a group of local businessmen - mostly real estate agents and car yard salesmen - unhappy with the cost of advertising in existing local publications. They sold their share to the Star News Group managed by fourth generation owner, Paul Thomas, in the mid-2000s with a gradual takeover by the family owned newspaper company.

The managing editor is Tony Galpin, a former senior journalist at the Independent before taking over as editor. He formerly worked on the Wimmera Mail Times.

== See also ==
- Geelong News
- Geelong Advertiser
