= Geelong Advertiser =

Newspaper in Geelong, Victoria, Australia

- Front page from 22 March 2024
- Type: Daily newspaper
- Format: Tabloid
- Owner: News Corp Australia
- Editor: Phillippa Butt
- Founded: 21 November 1840
- Headquarters: 126 Little Malop Street, Geelong, Victoria, Australia
- ISSN: 1440-1398
- OCLC number: 216129900
- Website: geelongadvertiser.com.au

The Geelong Advertiser is a daily newspaper circulating in Geelong, Victoria, Australia, the Bellarine Peninsula, and surrounding areas. First published on 21 November 1840, the Geelong Advertiser is the oldest newspaper title in Victoria and the second-oldest in Australia. The newspaper is currently owned by News Corp. It was the Pacific Area Newspaper Publishers Association 2009 Newspaper of the Year (circulation 25,000 to 90,000).

== History ==
The Geelong Advertiser was initially edited by James Harrison, a Scottish emigrant, who had arrived in Sydney in 1837 to set up a printing press for the English company Tegg & Co.

Moving to Melbourne in 1839, he found employment with John Pascoe Fawkner, as a compositor, and later editor, of Fawkner's Port Phillip Patriot. When Fawkner acquired a new press, Harrison offered him £30 for the original press, and started Geelong's first newspaper. The first edition of the Geelong Advertiser, which originally appeared weekly, was published on Saturday 21 November 1840, edited by 'James Harrison and printed and published for John Pascoe Fawkner (sole proprietor) by William Watkins...'

Its first editorial offered the following doggerel:

Bring forth the press!

When first that mighty shout was heard.
Truth rose in radiant light ensphered.

The Nations to address.

By November 1842 Harrison had become the sole owner of the paper. For the first seven years it was printed in demi-folio size before changing to broadsheet. In 1858 the newspaper retired the original wooden press, adopted new typography, and was printed by a mechanised steam press.

From 1845 to 1847, the newspaper was named the 'Geelong Advertiser, and Squatters Advocate'. The first edition under this title published on 28 May 1845.

In 1860 the Advertiser was purchased by Alfred Douglass, but Harrison continued as editor until the end of March 1865, when he and Daniel Harrison left to found the Register. Harrison was succeeded by Westfield as co-editor with G. R. Rippon (subsequently proprietor of the Hamilton Spectator). In June 1866 Hicks succeeded Westfield and held the position for a year, when Horatio "Horace" Rowcroft became editor, and held that position till the Register amalgamated with the Advertiser in August 1869, and Berry served as editor for a considerable time.

The newspaper did not feature news on the front page until 21 June 1924, coinciding with the inauguration of a new printing press. Before that time the front page was devoted to classified advertising. Trials of a tabloid-sized paper were made in 2000, when a Sunday edition was printed for the Sydney 2000 Olympic Games. The large broadsheet paper size was used until 2001, when the newspaper changed to the tabloid format which has been used since.

== See also ==
- Geelong News
- Geelong Independent
