= Pako Festa =

Coordinates: 38°8′28″S 144°20′54″E

Pako Festa is an annual festival held in Pakington Street, Geelong West, each year around late February. The festival is held to promote cultural diversity and show appreciation for the artwork and fashion designed by citizens of the Geelong area.

The first festival was held in 1983, and it currently attracts the participation of around 30 cultural community groups, up to 60 community groups and a total attendance in excess of 100,000 people. It is the largest multicultural festival in Victoria.
