= Geelong West =

- Suburb
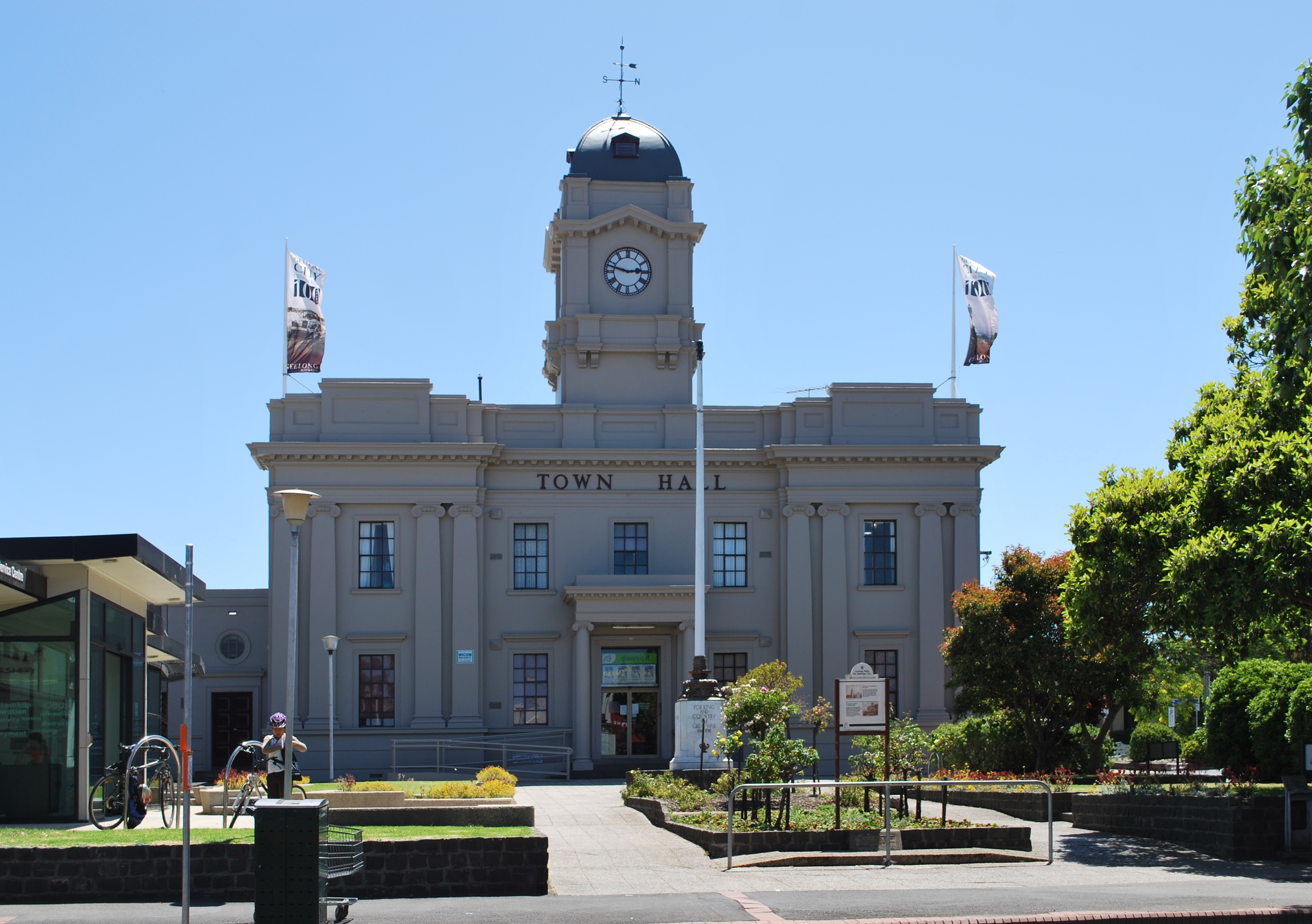
- The former City of Geelong West Town Hall

- Interactive map of Geelong West
- Coordinates: 38°08′S 144°21′E
- Country: Australia
- State: Victoria
- City: Geelong
- LGA: City of Greater Geelong

Government
  - State electorate: Geelong
  - Federal division: Corio

Population
  - Total: 6,966 (2016 census)
- Postcode: 3218
Suburbs around Geelong West
Hamlyn Heights	North Geelong	Drumcondra
Manifold Heights	Geelong West	Geelong CBD
Newtown	Newtown	Geelong CBD

Geelong West is a commercial and residential suburb of Geelong, Victoria, Australia. When Geelong was founded, the area was known as Kildare but its name was changed to Geelong West in 1875. The main street is Pakington Street. At the 2016 census, Geelong West had a population of 6,966.

== History ==
Ashby was once a suburb of Geelong located in the area of Geelong West, west of Latrobe Terrace, between Aberdeen Street and Church Street. By 1850, that area had become known as Little Scotland, and Kildare. At that time, Ashby referred to the area between Autumn Street and Waratah Street.

In 1875, the entire Ashby area was renamed Geelong West. The Ashby state school, which had only opened that year, had its name changed to Geelong West. In 1988, as part of Australia's bicentennial celebrations, the school changed its name back to Ashby. A Post Office named Geelong West opened on 1 July 1865, but was replaced and renamed Geelong North Railway Station in 1886. On 1 April 1887, the Geelong West office reopened near its present location. In 1960, Shandeen Post Office opened near the corner of Aberdeen Road and Shannon Avenue.

From 1912 until 1956, Geelong West was served by an electric tramway service in Pakington Street, after which the service was replaced by buses run by CDC Geelong.

The M. Donaghy & Sons ropeworks was located in Pakington Street. The site has been redeveloped into a shopping centre, with a Woolworths (formerly Safeway) supermarket and other shops.

== Heritage listed sites ==
Geelong West contains a number of heritage listed sites, including:

- 22 Pakington Street, Harp Inn
- 95 Pakington Street, Donaghy's Rope Walk
- 233 Pakington Street, Reformed Church of Geelong
- 9 Gertrude Street, Residence
- 202 Aberdeen Street, Shearers Arms Hotel
- 127 Elizabeth Street, St Elmo

== Governance ==
Geelong West Borough was established in 1875, and was proclaimed a Town in 1922. It absorbed the Moorpanyal riding part of Corio Shire in 1926, and was proclaimed a City in 1929.

In 1993 Geelong West City was amalgamated with part of Bannockburn Shire, part of Barrabool Shire, Bellarine Rural City, Corio Shire, Geelong City, Newtown City & South Barwon City to form Greater Geelong City.

== Notable people ==
Journalist and publisher J. F. Archibald was born in Geelong West in 1856. A memorial bust was erected on the corner of Weddell Road and Church St in 1956.

== Pako Festa ==
The Pako Festa is an annual festival held in Pakington Street, Geelong West each year around late February. In 2006 it was held on 25 February. The festival is held to promote cultural diversity and show appreciation for the artwork and fashion designed by citizens of the Geelong area.

== Sport ==
The suburb has an Australian rules football team competing in the Geelong Football League and a team competing in the Geelong & District Football League.
