= Rural City of Bellarine =

Rural City of Bellarine Victoria
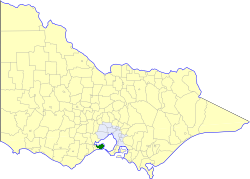
- Location in Victoria
- The Rural City of Bellarine as at its dissolution in 1993
- Population: 44,180 (1992)
  - Density: 133.161/km^{2} (344.88/sq mi)
- Established: 1853
- Area: 331.78 km^{2} (128.1 sq mi)
- Council seat: Drysdale
- Region: Barwon South West
- County: Grant
LGAs around Rural City of Bellarine:
| Geelong | Corio Bay | Port Phillip |
| South Barwon | Rural City of Bellarine | Queenscliffe |
| South Barwon | Bass Strait | Bass Strait |

The Rural City of Bellarine was a local government area southeast of the regional city of Geelong, Victoria, Australia, covering most of the Bellarine Peninsula. The Rural City covered an area of 331.78 square kilometres (128.1 sq mi), and from its origin as the Portarlington Road District, existed in a number of forms and under different names from 1853 until 1993.

== History ==
Bellarine was first incorporated as the Portarlington Road District on 12 December 1853, and became a shire on 26 September 1865. On 12 December 1989, Bellarine was proclaimed a rural city.

On 18 May 1993, the Rural City of Bellarine was abolished, and along with the Cities of Geelong, Geelong West and Newtown, the Shire of Corio and parts of the City of South Barwon and the Shires of Barrabool and Bannockburn, was merged into the newly created City of Greater Geelong.

== Wards ==
The Rural City of Bellarine was divided into three ridings, each of which elected three councillors:

- Bellarine Riding
- Paywit Riding
- Moolap Riding

== Towns and localities ==
- Bellarine
- Clifton Springs
- Curlewis
- Drysdale* (including the neighbourhood of Murradoc)
- Indented Head
- Leopold
- Mannerim
- Marcus Hill
- Moolap (including the neighbourhood of Point Henry)
- Newcomb
- Ocean Grove
- Point Lonsdale (shared with the Borough of Queenscliffe)
- Portarlington
- St Leonards
- Swan Bay
- Wallington (including the neighbourhood of Fenwick)
- Whittington

* Council seat.

== Population ==
| Year | Population |
|---|---|
| 1954 | 7,015 |
| 1958 | 9,270* |
| 1961 | 10,127 |
| 1966 | 14,529 |
| 1971 | 18,791 |
| 1976 | 24,495 |
| 1981 | 30,014 |
| 1986 | 35,302 |
| 1991 | 41,130 |

* Estimate in 1958 Victorian Year Book.
