= Connewarre =

- Town
- Lake Connewarre seen from Taits Point

- Coordinates: 38°16′S 144°24′E
- Country: Australia
- State: Victoria
- City: Geelong
- LGAs: City of Greater Geelong; Surf Coast Shire
- Location: 90 km (56 mi) SW of Melbourne; 15 km (9.3 mi) S of Geelong; 12 km (7.5 mi) NE of Torquay

Government
  - State electorates: Bellarine; South Barwon
  - Federal division: Corangamite

Population
  - Total: 788 (2016 census)
- Postcode: 3227
Localities around Connewarre
Armstrong Creek	Moolap; Leopold	Wallington
Mount Duneed	Connewarre	Barwon Heads
Torquay	Breamlea	Bass Strait

Connewarre (/kˈɒnəwʌri/) is a locality in Victoria, Australia, is located in the City of Greater Geelong and Surf Coast Shire, and is named after Lake Connewarre which is situated immediately to its north-east. Connewarre is a version of "kunuwarra", the name of the black swan in the Wathawurrung language. At the 2016 census, Connewarre and the surrounding area had a population of 788.

Part of the Eastern Precinct of the large Armstrong Creek Growth Area was within Connewarre when urban development began in 2010, but in 2012, when the new suburb Armstrong Creek was gazetted, Connewarre's boundary was adjusted to exclude the area north of Lower Duneed Road and the west of Baenschs Lane, meaning that all of the Growth Area then lay outside Connewarre.

Settlements near Connewarre include Breamlea to the south, Torquay to the west and Barwon Heads to the east.

== History ==
The Post Office opened on 9 September 1860 and closed in 1967. An earlier Connewarre office was renamed Mount Duneed.

The former Connewarre Primary School has been closed and merged with Mount Duneed Primary School.

== Governance ==
The Connewarre road district was proclaimed in 1856, and extended in 1859 to include the Mount Duneed, Torquay and Breamlea districts. In 1874, it was amalgamated with South Barwon Borough to create the Shire of South Barwon, which was proclaimed a city in 1974.

In May 1993, the City of South Barwon was amalgamated with the Shire of Barrabool, the Rural City of Bellarine, the Shire of Corio, the City of Geelong, the City of Geelong West, the City of Newtown, and part of the Shire of Bannockburn, to form the City of Greater Geelong. In March 1994, the southern-most part of Connewarre was included in the Surf Coast Shire, on its creation.
