= City of Geelong =

Coordinates: 38°09′S 144°21′E

- Local government area
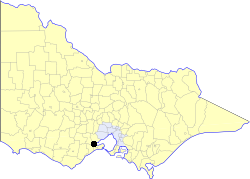
- Location in Victoria

- The extent of the City of Geelong at its dissolution in 1993
- Country: Australia
- State: Victoria
- Region: Barwon South West
- Established: 1849
- Council seat: Geelong

Area
  - Total: 13.4 km^{2} (5.2 sq mi)

Population
  - Total: 13,390 (1992)
  - Density: 999/km^{2} (2,588/sq mi)
- County: Grant
LGAs around City of Geelong
Geelong West	Corio	Corio Bay
Newtown	City of Geelong	Bellarine
South Barwon	South Barwon	Bellarine

The City of Geelong was a local government area about 75 kilometres (47 mi) southwest of Melbourne, the state capital of Victoria, Australia. The city covered an area of 13.4 square kilometres (5.2 sq mi), and existed from 1849 until 1993.

== History ==
Geelong was the second municipality in Victoria, after the City of Melbourne. It was established under the Geelong Incorporation Act (NSW) in October 1849, and proclaimed as a town on 4 June 1858. On 8 December 1910, it was proclaimed a city.

On 18 May 1993, the City of Geelong was abolished, and along with the Cities of Geelong West and Newtown, the Rural City of Bellarine, the Shire of Corio and parts of the City of South Barwon and the Shires of Barrabool and Bannockburn, was merged into the newly created City of Greater Geelong.

== Wards ==
The City of Geelong was divided into five wards, each of which elected three councillors:

- Barwon Ward
- Bellarine Ward
- Fidge Ward
- Kardinia Ward
- Ormond Ward

== Geography ==
The city consisted of two parts. The main section, which included Geelong City, Breakwater, East Geelong and South Geelong, was bounded by Corio Bay to the northeast, Barwon River to the southeast, Boundary Road to the east and La Trobe Terrace to the west.

An additional section further to the north, between Victoria Street, Bell Parade and Thomson Road, included the suburb of Rippleside and part of Geelong North.

== Population ==
Year	Population
1954	20,034
1958	20,680*
1961	18,019
1966	18,138
1971	17,836
1976	15,727
1981	14,471
1986	13,441
1991	13,036

* Estimate in the 1958 Victorian Year Book.
