= City of Geelong West =

Coordinates: 38°08′S 144°21′E

- Local government area
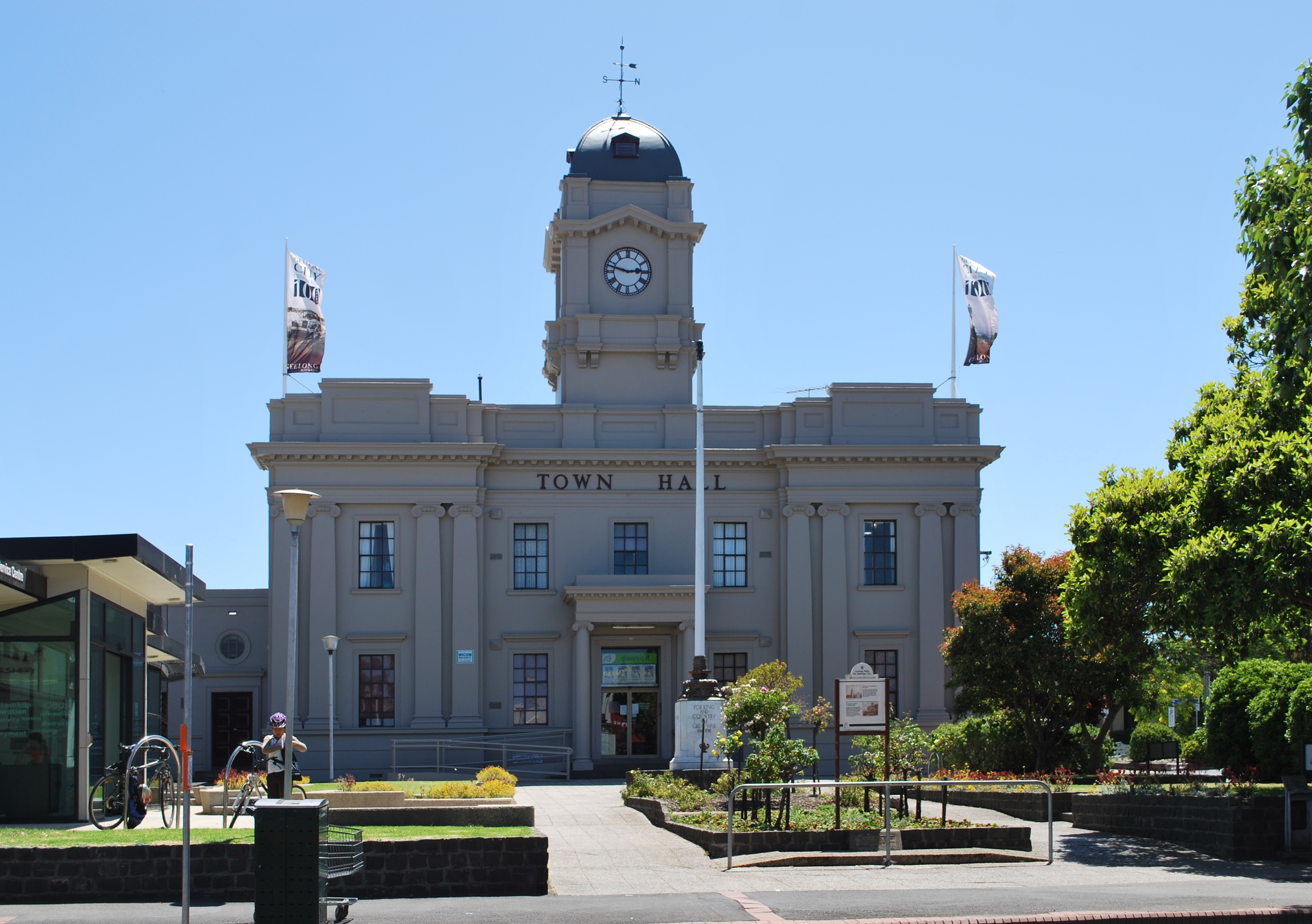
- Geelong West Town Hall

- The extent of the City of Geelong West at its dissolution in 1993
- Country: Australia
- State: Victoria
- Region: Barwon South West
- Established: 1875
- Council seat: Geelong West

Area
  - Total: 5.26 km^{2} (2.03 sq mi)

Population
  - Total(s): 13,630 (1992)
  - Density: 2,591/km^{2} (6,711/sq mi)
- County: Grant
LGAs around City of Geelong West
Corio	Geelong (part)	Corio Bay
Corio	City of Geelong West	Geelong
Newtown	Newtown	Geelong

The City of Geelong West was a local government area about 5 kilometres (3 mi) west of the regional city of Geelong, Victoria, Australia. The city covered an area of 5.26 square kilometres (2.0 sq mi), and existed from 1875 until 1993.

== History ==
Geelong West was first incorporated as a borough on 29 May 1875, and became a town on 22 March 1922. After annexing the Moorpanyal Riding of the Shire of Corio on 9 December 1926, to form its fourth ward (West Ward), it was proclaimed as a city on 17 April 1929.

On 18 May 1993, the City of Geelong West was abolished, and along with the Cities of Geelong and Newtown, the Rural City of Bellarine, the Shire of Corio and parts of the City of South Barwon and the Shires of Barrabool and Bannockburn, was merged into the newly created City of Greater Geelong.

== Wards ==
The City of Geelong West was divided into four wards, each of which elected three councillors:

- Little Scotland Ward
- Ashby Ward
- Kildare Ward
- Manifold Ward

== Geography ==
The City was bounded by La Trobe Terrace to the east, Aberdeen, Minerva and Autumn Streets to the south, McCurdy Road to the west and Church Street, Western Oval and Coxon and Bell Parades to the north. It included the suburbs of Geelong West, Drumcondra, Herne Hill and Manifold Heights.

The Geelong West Town Hall was located at the corner of Pakington and Albert Streets, Geelong West. The building, constructed in 1923-1924, still exists, and is available for hire for functions and meetings. It replaced and earlier building, constructed in 1869.

== Population ==
Year	Population
1954	17,313
1958	18,290*
1961	17,681
1966	17,446
1971	17,248
1976	15,978
1981	14,823
1986	13,802
1991	13,448

* Estimate in the 1958 Victorian Year Book.
