= List of shire presidents of Barrabool =

This is a list of shire presidents and mayors of the Shire of Barrabool in south-western Victoria. Barrabool was incorporated as the second road district in the colony on 28 December 1853, and became a shire on 13 June 1865. On 31 May 1927, it annexed part of the Shire of Winchelsea. On 18 May 1993, parts of the shire were annexed to the newly created City of Greater Geelong. On 9 March 1994, the Shire of Barrabool was abolished, and, along with the remainder of the City of South Barwon and parts of the Shire of Winchelsea, was merged into the newly created Surf Coast Shire.

== Shire Presidents ==
| President | Term |
|---|---|
| John Rout Hopkins | 1865-1868 |
| M. Dwyer | 1869-1870 |
| J. Gundry | 1871 |
| F. U. Brequet | 1872 |
| J. R Hopkins | 1872 |
| Unknown | 1873 |
| J. R Hopkins | 1874 |
| R. McDonald | 1875 |
| R. Fletcher | 1876-1877 |
| B. Allin | 1878 |
| C. H. Milner | 1879 |
| L. Conran | 1880 |
| P. Corbett | 1881 |
| D. White | 1882 |
| J. R. Hopkins | 1883 |
| H. Squire | 1884 |
| C. H. Milner | 1885 |
| P. Corbett | 1886-1888 |
| C. H. Milner | 1889 |
| B. Allin | 1890-1991 |
| M. Doherty | 1892 |
| R. P. Piper | 1893 |
| C. Milner | 1894 |
| M. Doherty | 1895 |
| R. P. Piper | 1896-1897 |
| W. Ham | 1898 |
| T. Larcombe | 1899 |
| W. F. Volum | 1900 |
| W. Ham | 1901 |
| W. F. Volum | 1902-1903 |
| W. F. McIntyre | 1904-1905 |
| R. Fletcher | 1906 |
| R. P. Piper | 1907 |
| W. R. Gundry | 1908 |
| W. Ham | 1908 |
| J. S. Hunt | 1909 |
| W. D. Anderson | 1910 |
| W. Ham | 1911 |
| J. Black | 1912 |
| R. Piper | 1913 |
| W. F. McIntyre | 1914 |
| W. F. Volum | 1915-1918 |
| W. F. McIntyre | 1919 |
| J. S. Hunt | 1920 |
| Sydney H. McCann | 1921 |
| W. F. McIntyre | 1922 |
| J. W. Prowse | 1923 |
| Sydney H. McCann | 1924 |
| W. F. McIntyre | 1925 |
| J. W. Prowse | 1926 |
| Sydney H. McCann | 1927 |
| W. F. McIntyre | 1928 |
| J. W. Prowse | 1929 |
| Sydney H. McCann | 1930 |
| W. F. McIntyre | 1931 |
| J. W. Prowse | 1932 |
| W. D. Anderson | 1933 |
| E. R. Dickins | 1934 |
| Sydney H. McCann | 1935 |
| J. W. White | 1936 |
| J. W. Prowse | 1937 |
| W. D. Anderson | 1938-1939 |
| E. R. Dickins | 1940 |
| Sydney H. McCann | 1941-1944 |
| J. W. White | 1945 |
| G. W. F. McIntyre | 1945 |
| J. W. Prowse | 1946 |
| W. D. Anderson | 1947 |
| G. W. F. McIntyre | 1948 |
| R. H. Larcombe | 1949 |
| C. W. Peel | 1950 |
| J. H. Mann | 1951 |
| E. R. Dickins | 1952 |
| G. McA. Cochrane | 1953 |
| F. L. Hedley | 1954 |
| J. H. Mann | 1955 |
| W. D. Anderson | 1956 |
| Robert Wood Pettitt | 1957-1958 |
| C. W. Peel | 1959 |
| G. McA. Cochrane | 1960 |
| A. E. Purnell | 1961 |
| W. J. Hunt | 1962 |
| C. W. Peel | 1963 |
| G. W. F. McIntyre | 1964 |
| M. H. Gerlach | 1965 |
| Robert Wood Pettitt | 1966 |
| G. McA. Cochrane | 1967 |
| L. R. Newman | 1968 |
| A. E. Purnell | 1969 |
| C. W. Peel | 1970 |
| B. J. Butterworth | 1971 |
| Robert Wood Pettitt | 1972 |
| C. W. Peel | 1973 |
| W. H. Tippett | 1974 |
| Robert Wood Pettitt | 1975 |
| William S. McCann | 1976 |
| W. H. Simon | 1977 |
| Robert Wood Pettitt | 1978 |
| M. G. Anderson | 1979 |
| Ron Burton | 1980 |
| M. G. Anderson | 1981 |
| Patricia Hickford | 1982 |
| R. S. Haebich | 1983 |
| T. J. Hill | 1984 |
| A. G. Denham | 1985 |
| M. G. Anderson | 1986 |
| Patricia Hickford | 1987 |
| D. J. Steel | 1988 |

== Mayors ==
| President | Term |
|---|---|
| T. W. Brown | 1989 |
| P. Hickford | 1990 |
| P. S. Wilson | 1991 |
| Unknown | 1992 |
| Max Anderson | 1993 |
| Unknown | 1994 |
