= Shire of Corio =

Coordinates: 38°04′S 144°21′E

- Local government area
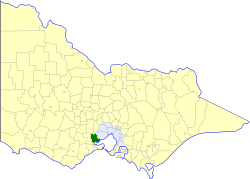
- Location in Victoria

- The Shire of Corio as at its dissolution in 1993
- Country: Australia
- State: Victoria
- Region: Barwon South West
- Established: 1861
- Council seat: Geelong North

Area
  - Total: 704.66 km^{2} (272.07 sq mi)

Population
  - Total: 57,720 (1992)
  - Density: 81.912/km^{2} (212.151/sq mi)
- County: Grant
LGAs around Shire of Corio
| Ballan | Bacchus Marsh | Werribee |
| Bannockburn | Shire of Corio | Werribee |
| Bannockburn | Geelong | Corio Bay |

The Shire of Corio was a local government area located between Geelong and Werribee, about 60 kilometres (37 mi) southwest of Melbourne, the state capital of Victoria, Australia. The shire, which included all of Geelong's northern suburbs, covered an area of 704.66 square kilometres (272.1 sq mi), and existed from 1861 until 1993.

== History ==
Corio was first incorporated as a road district on 3 April 1861, and became a shire on 21 June 1864. Part of the Lara Riding was lost to the Shire of Bacchus Marsh on 15 March 1911, but the same riding gained part of the Shire of Bannockburn on 31 May 1916. The Moorpanyal Riding was transferred to the City of Geelong West on 9 December 1926, becoming its West Ward.

On 18 May 1993, the Shire of Corio was abolished, and along with the Cities of Geelong, Geelong West and Newtown, the Rural City of Bellarine and parts of the City of South Barwon and the Shires of Barrabool and Bannockburn, was merged into the newly created City of Greater Geelong.

== Wards ==
The Shire of Corio was divided into four ridings, each of which elected three councillors:

- Flinders Riding;
- Hovell Riding;
- Hume Riding;
- Peak Riding.

== Towns and localities ==
Urban Geelong

- Bell Park
- Bell Post Hill
- Corio
- Fyansford
- Geelong North*
- Hamlyn Heights
- Norlane
- North Shore
- Rosewall

Rural

- Anakie
- Avalon
- Balliang
- Batesford
- Lara
- Little River
- Lovely Banks
- Moorabool
- Staughton Vale

* Council seat.

== Population ==
| Year | Population |
|---|---|
| 1954 | 15,808 |
| 1958 | 22,590* |
| 1961 | 29,450 |
| 1966 | 36,226 |
| 1971 | 40,544 |
| 1976 | 46,832 |
| 1981 | 50,840 |
| 1986 | 53,085 |
| 1991 | 55,659 |

* Estimate in 1958 Victorian Year Book.
