= City of Newtown =

Coordinates: 38°09′S 144°20′E

City of Newtown Victoria
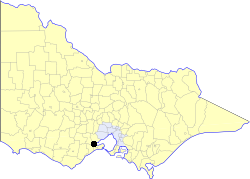
- Location in Victoria
- The extent of the City of Newtown at its dissolution in 1993
- Population: 10,210 (1992)
  - Density: 1,641.5/km^{2} (4,251/sq mi)
- Established: 1858
- Area: 6.22 km^{2} (2.4 sq mi)
- Council seat: Newtown
- Region: Barwon South West
- County: Grant
LGAs around City of Newtown:
Corio	Geelong West	Geelong
Bannockburn	City of Newtown	Geelong
South Barwon	South Barwon	South Barwon

The City of Newtown was a local government area about 3 kilometres (1.9 mi) west of the regional city of Geelong, Victoria, Australia. The city covered an area of 6.22 square kilometres (2.4 sq mi), and existed from 1858 until 1993.

== History ==
Newtown and Chilwell was first incorporated as a borough on 9 March 1858, and became a town on 16 April 1924. It was proclaimed a city on 7 October 1949. It was renamed the City of Newtown on 22 November 1967.

On 18 May 1993, the City of Newtown was abolished, and along with the Cities of Geelong and Geelong West, the Rural City of Bellarine, the Shire of Corio, and parts of the City of South Barwon and the Shires of Barrabool and Bannockburn, was merged into the newly created City of Greater Geelong.

== Wards ==
The City of Newtown was divided into three wards, each of which elected three councillors:

- North Ward
- South Ward
- West Ward

== Geography ==
The City of Newtown consisted of the suburb of Newtown, on the north bank of the Barwon River, and extended across the river to include Queens Park. It was bounded by Aberdeen, Minerva and Autumn Streets to the north, the Barwon River to the south, and La Trobe Terrace to the east.

The Town Hall was located at 271 Pakington Street opposite Laurel Bank Parade and next door to the Newtown and Chilwell Fire station.

== Population ==
Year	Population
1921	7,240
1954	11,191
1958	11,860*
1961	11,788
1966	11,700
1971	11,621
1976	10,797
1981	10,210*
1986	10,026*
1991	9,854

* Estimates in 1958, 1983 and 1988 Victorian Year Books.
