= Shire of Winchelsea =

Coordinates: 38°14′S 143°59′E

- Local government area
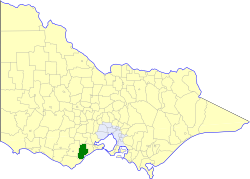
- Location in Victoria

- The Shire of Winchelsea as at its dissolution in 1994
- Country: Australia
- State: Victoria
- Region: Barwon South West
- Established: 1860
- Council seat: Winchelsea

Area
  - Total: 1,294 km^{2} (500 sq mi)

Population
  - Total: 5,020 (1992)
  - Density: 3.879/km^{2} (10.048/sq mi)
- County: Grant, Grenville, Polwarth
LGAs around Shire of Winchelsea
Colac	Leigh	Bannockburn
Colac	Shire of Winchelsea	Barrabool
Otway	Otway	Bass Strait

The Shire of Winchelsea was a local government area about 110 kilometres (68 mi) southwest of Melbourne, the state capital of Victoria, Australia. The shire covered an area of 1,294 square kilometres (499.6 sq mi), and existed from 1860 until 1994.

== History ==
Winchelsea was first incorporated as a road district on 9 November 1860, and became a shire on 27 May 1864. On 6 May 1919, part of the shire was annexed to the then new Shire of Otway, and on 31 May 1927, parts were annexed to the Shire of Barrabool. On 1 April 1989, Winchelsea annexed parts of the Shire of Barrabool, and was re subdivided into three ridings.

On 9 March 1994, the Shire of Winchelsea was abolished, and along with parts of the City of South Barwon and the Shire of Barrabool, was merged into the newly created Surf Coast Shire.

== Wards ==
The Shire of Winchelsea was divided into three ridings on 1 April 1989, each of which elected three councillors:

- North Riding
- Middle Riding
- Coast Riding

== Towns and localities ==
- Armytage
- Bambra
- Barwon Downs
- Benwerrin
- Birregurra
- Boonah
- Buckley
- Deans Marsh
- Fairholme
- Lorne
- Murroon
- Ombersley
- Pennyroyal
- Ricketts Marsh
- Ripplevale
- Wensleydale
- Whoorel
- Winchelsea*
- Wurdiboluc
- Yan Yan Gurt

* Council seat.

== Population ==
Year	Population
1954	4,361
1958	4,770*
1961	4,584
1966	4,246
1971	3,998
1976	3,858
1981	3,879
1986	4,113
1991	4,785

* Estimate in 1958 Victorian Year Book.
