= Biyal-a Armstrong Creek Library =

Coordinates: 38.2265°S 144.339°E

- Formation: 2024
- Location: Armstrong Creek, Victoria, Australia

The Biyal-a Armstrong Creek Library is a regional library and community hub located in Armstrong Creek, Geelong, Victoria, Australia. The library officially opened to the public on August 1, 2024 and is designed to serve the growing Armstrong Creek community.

== History ==
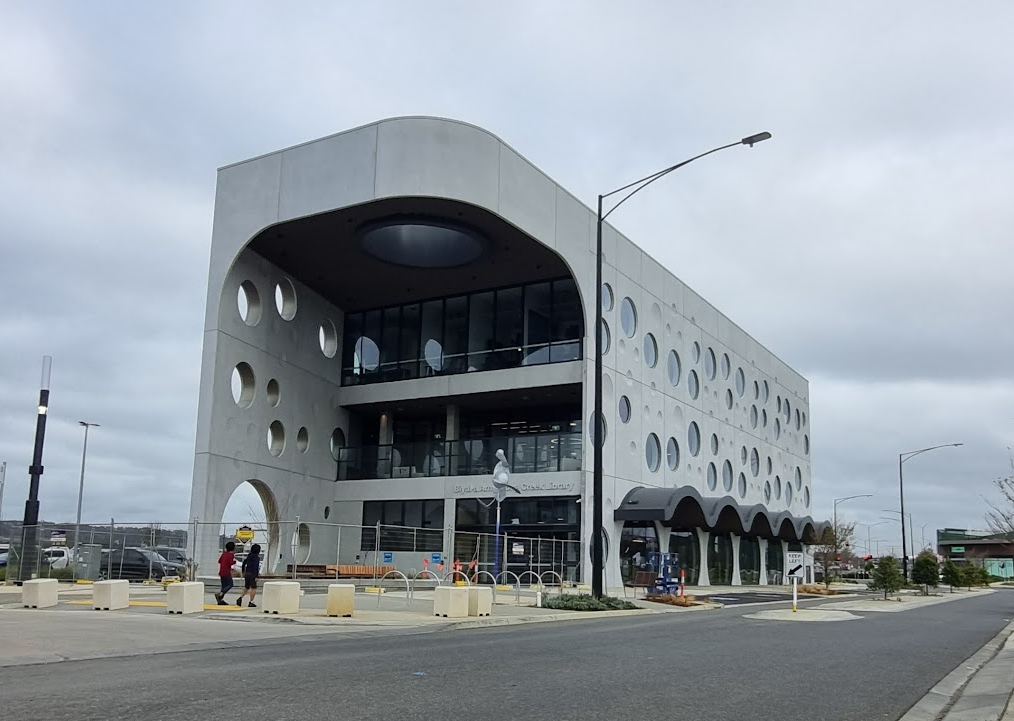
Biyal-a Armstrong Creek Library building, taken on July 4, 2024, before the library opened.

The Biyal-a Armstrong Creek Library, with a project cost of AU$21.864 million, began construction in 2022. It is located within the Armstrong Creek Town Square and shopping precinct. The name "Biyal-a" reflects the Wadawurrung language, meaning "place of many red gums" and "red gums speak lots of stories," symbolizing the cultural heritage and natural landscape of the area.

== Funding ==
The City of Greater Geelong contributed AU$20.364 million to the project, while the Victorian Government provided an additional AU$1.5 million through the Living Libraries Grant.

== Facilities ==
The library is a three-level facility featuring:

- A children's story time area
- A library service
- Accessible contemporary amenities
- Multipurpose spaces
- Outdoor terraces
- Creative spaces for community use
- A collection of more than 30,000 books and resources

== Design & Award ==
The building includes a water-thread narrative on the ground floor, capturing the First Nations culture and connection to the local landscape. The design and planning of the library involved consultation with the Wadawurrung Traditional Owners Aboriginal Corporation.The library, which was designed by Buchan Architects, has received a commendation in the public library category at the Australian Library and Information Association’s 2026 Design Awards.

== Name Registration ==
While the facility is commonly referred to as Biyal-a Armstrong Creek Library, it carries the registered title "Biyala Armstrong Creek Library" with the Office of Geographical Names. This adjustment was made due to emergency services' inability to list and search names with a hyphen during emergencies.
