= Dan Kearney =

Australian rules footballer

Personal information
- Full name: Daniel Martin Kearney
- Born: 23 May 1921; Geelong, Victoria
- Died: 19 August 1984 (aged 63); Clifton Springs, Victoria
- Original team: St Josephs College
- Height: 183 cm (6 ft 0 in)
- Weight: 79 kg (174 lb)

Playing career^{1}
Years	Club	Games (Goals)
1941	Geelong	3 (0)
1942	North Melbourne	3 (0)
Total		6 (0)
- ^{1} Playing statistics correct to the end of 1942.

Daniel Martin Kearney (23 May 1921 – 19 August 1984) was an Australian rules footballer who played with Geelong and North Melbourne in the Victorian Football League (VFL).

== Family ==
The grandson of Geelong (VFA) footballer Daniel Michael "Nasher" Kearney (1864-1925), and the son of Geelong (VFL) footballer James Patrick Kearney (1893-1944), and Elizabeth Mary Kearney (1891-1982), née Lang, Daniel Martin Kearney was born at Geelong, Victoria, on 23 May 1921.

He married Catherine Iverson McLean (1919-2009) in 1944.

== Death ==
He died at the Geelong suburb of Clifton Springs on 19 August 1984.
