= City of South Barwon =

Coordinates: 38°10′S 144°20′E

- Local government area
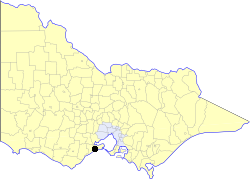
- Location in Victoria

- The extent of the City of South Barwon from 1960 to May 1993
- Country: Australia
- State: Victoria
- Region: Barwon South West
- Established: 1863
- Council seat: Belmont

Area
  - Total: 165.4 km^{2} (63.9 sq mi)

Population
  - Total: 43,780 (1992)
  - Density: 264.69/km^{2} (685.55/sq mi)
- County: Grant
LGAs around City of South Barwon
Newtown	Newtown	Geelong
Barrabool	City of South Barwon	Bellarine
Barrabool	Bass Strait	Bass Strait

The City of South Barwon was a local government area in Victoria, Australia, which contained a number of Geelong suburbs south of the Barwon River, and extending to Torquay in the south and Barwon Heads to the east. The city covered an area of 165.4 square kilometres (63.9 sq mi), and existed from 1863 until 1994.

== History ==
South Barwon was formed as a road district, when it was severed from the Corporation of Geelong on 2 June 1857. It then covered 9 square miles (23 km^{2}) and 600 households. It was incorporated as a borough on 21 October 1863, and became a town on 24 December 1874, when it was amalgamated with the Connewarre Road District, and now covered 64 square miles (170 km^{2}) and 1714 people. It was proclaimed as a city on 6 December 1974.

The first council offices were on Mount Pleasant Road in Belmont, which opened in 1884 at a cost of £1400. New chambers were built in 1970, and in 1974, plans were made for a new Civic Centre on the corner of the Princes Highway and Reynolds Road, Belmont. Plans were approved in 1976, a tender was accepted and the first sod turned in August 1977, and on 24 May 1978, it was officially opened. The Mount Pleasant Road offices became a community centre. After amalgamation, the Civic Centre was used by the City of Greater Geelong as offices, before being sold to Barwon Health.

On 18 May 1993, significant proportions of its land area were annexed to the newly created City of Greater Geelong, despite concerns expressed by the coastal town of Torquay that it was a separate community of interest from Geelong. The Shire of Barrabool, which had been significantly reduced by the creation of Greater Geelong and had lost much of its rates base, joined Torquay residents in suggesting the Kennett Liberal government create a coastal shire, which united Torquay and Anglesea. On 9 March 1994, the City of South Barwon was abolished, and along with the remainder of the Shire of Barrabool and parts of the Shire of Winchelsea, was merged into the newly created Surf Coast Shire, which established its administrative centre at Torquay.

== Wards ==
The City of South Barwon was divided into four wards on 19 May 1978, each of which elected three councillors:

- Belmont Ward
- Connewarre Ward
- Grovedale Ward
- Highton Ward

== Towns and localities ==
- Barwon Heads
- Belmont*
- Breamlea
- Connewarre
- Grovedale
- Highton
- Marshall
- Mount Duneed (shared with the Shire of Barrabool)
- Torquay (shared with the Shire of Barrabool)

* Council seat.

== Population ==
Year	Population
1954	11,016
1958	14,520*
1961	16,794
1966	22,049
1971	26,764
1976	32,411
1981	35,307
1986	38,019
1991	40,772

* Estimate in the 1958 Victorian Year Book.
