= Archie Grigg =

Australian rules footballer

Personal information
- Full name: William Archibald Grigg
- Born: 15 February 1895; Bellarine, Victoria
- Died: 15 October 1983 (aged 88); Frankston, Victoria
- Height: 175 cm (5 ft 9 in)
- Weight: 71 kg (157 lb)

Playing career^{1}
Years	Club	Games (Goals)
1919	Melbourne	3 (1)
- ^{1} Playing statistics correct to the end of 1919.

William Archibald Grigg (15 February 1895 – 15 October 1983) was an Australian rules footballer who played for the Melbourne Football Club in the Victorian Football League (VFL).
