= Summerhill (Mount Duneed) =

Summerhill is a prefabricated iron cottage at 155 Mount Duneed Road, Mount Duneed a suburb of Geelong, Victoria, Australia. It is notable because it demonstrates British technical accomplishment in the history of prefabricated building construction.

== History ==
The development of a galvanising process in the 1840s, the fabrication of rolled sections of wrought iron from about 1850, and the use of grooved or fluted rollers to improve the production of corrugated iron in 1844 enabled construction of this building. It demonstrates the innovative solutions provided by the use of imported prefabricated buildings to cope with housing shortages caused by the gold rushes in Australia and California in the early 1850s.

It is a rare example of a two-room prefabricated iron cottage and one of only a small number of this type of building remaining which date from the early 1850s. It is the only known curved roof single storey cottage extant in Victoria. It provides an example of the simple living conditions of some of the early settlers in Victoria. It is listed on the Victorian Heritage Register number H1131. It consists of two rooms and is believed to have been brought to Australia by Mr Joseph Williams with his family from England and lived in until a weatherboard house consisting of four rooms was erected in 1860 with further additions in the 1870s. It measures 24 feet by twelve feet and is 9.5 feet high to the top of the segmental arched roof.

Mr and Mrs Joseph Williams and their two sons George and James with their niece Elizabeth Frear arrived in Melbourne by sailing ship 'Lochiel' in 1853, and the cottage was erected in 1854.
