= 2017 Greater Geelong City Council election =

Local election in Australia

All 11 seats on the City Council 6 seats needed for a majority
	First party	Second party
Party	Independents	Liberal
Seats before	4	5
Seats won	5	4
Seat change	▲1	▼1
	Third party	Fourth party
Party	Labor	Greens
Seats before	2	1
Seats won	1	1
Seat change	▼1	Steady

The 2017 Greater Geelong local election was held on 27 October 2017 to elect 11 councillors to the City of Greater Geelong in Victoria.

More than 50 candidates contested across the four wards, including 19 in Brownbill.

The election was conducted by post by the Victorian Electoral Commission.

== Background ==
The previous Greater Geelong City Council was elected in 2012, while Mayor Darryn Lyons was elected at a 2013 by-election.

The council was sacked by the Andrews Government in May 2016 after allegations of bullying, with administrators installed to manage city and council affairs as well as to remove cultural problems that led to the sacking.

While all other local government areas in Victoria went to the polls in November 2016 as per usual, Geelong did not. Instead, a Citizen's Jury was established to help determine a way forward, including deciding on the structure a future council should take.

Eventually, legislation was introduced and passed the Victorian Parliament to bring forward elections to October 2017 instead of 2020, as was originally planned.

== Electoral system ==
For the first time in Geelong, councillors were elected to four multi-member wards:

- Bellarine (3 councillors)
- Brownbill (3 councillors)
- Kardinia (3 councillors)
- Windermere (2 councillors)

Before this, the council comprised 12 wards that each had a single councillor, as well as a directly-elected mayor. They were as follows:

- Austin
- Beangala
- Brownbill
- Buckley
- Cheetham
- Corio
- Coryule
- Cowie
- Deakin
- Kardinia
- Kildare
- Windermere

Proportional representation was introduced at the 2017 election, with instant-runoff voting used previously.

== Results ==
Party	Votes	%	Seats	Change
Independent			5	▲1
Independent Liberal			4	▼1
Independent Labor			1	▼1
Greens			1	Steady
Animal Justice			0	Steady
Socialist Alliance			0	Steady
Independent Nationals			0	Steady
Formal votes				

=== Bellarine (3 councillors) ===
2017 Greater Geelong local election: Bellarine Ward
Party	Candidate	Votes	%	±%
Independent Liberal	Stephanie Asher	10,984	27.38	
Independent Liberal	Trent Sullivan	3,437	8.57	
Animal Justice	Naomi Adams	3,129	7.80	
Independent	Tom Roe	2,501	6.23	
Independent	Petra Goerschel	954	2.38	
Turnout				

9 candidate declared
Party	Candidate	Background
Animal Justice Party	Naomi Adams	
Independent	Stephanie Asher	Consultant
Independent	Anne Brackley	
Labor	Jim Mason	
Greens	Stephen McGain	
Independent	Art Sims	
Liberal	Trent Sullivan	President of the Geelong Young Liberals, real estate agent
Liberal	John Van Beveren	Lawyer and small business owner
Independent	Stewart Webb	

=== Brownbill (3 councillors) ===
19 candidates declared, in alphabetical order
Party	Candidate	Background
Independent	Mik Aidt	Journalist and community radio host
Independent	George Ballas	Community advocate, former Chairman of Pako Festa
Independent	Nicole Brown	
Socialist Alliance	Sue Bull	Activist and unionist
Labor	Melissa Cadwell	Manager at Melbourne Health
Labor	Ellen Csar	Advocate and teaching aid
Independent	Freya Fidge	HR Professional, family history of Councilors and Mayors
Animal Justice Party	Jennifer Gamble	Nurse
Independent	Terry Gillard	Community Involvement
Socialist Alliance	Sarah Hathway	Student and activist
Animal Justice Party	Jacqui Jacka	Nurse
Liberal	Michael King	Businessman
Liberal	Eddy Kontelj	Former Councillor
Greens	Sarah Mansfield	General Practitioner
Independent	Peter Mitchell	Business Solutions
Independent	Peter Murrihy	Former Councillor
Nationals	Charles Neal	Tourism boat operator
Independent	Alec Sandner	Former City of Greater Bendigo mayor
Independent	Stephen Simmonds	

=== Kardinia (3 councillors) ===
9 candidates declared, in alphabetical order.
Party	Candidate	Background
Independent	Bruce Harwood	Former Councillor
Labor	Brent Lyons-Lee	
Independent	Darren Hauenstein	IT professional
Independent	Doug Mann	Teacher
Independent	Pat Murnane	
Liberal	Ron Nelson	Former Councillor, former archivist.
Greens	Lois Newman	Student, president of the Deakin Greens on Campus in Geelong.
Animal Justice Party	Elliot Taylor	
Independent	Mary Walker	Theatre director, former teacher

=== Windermere (2 councillors) ===
10 candidates declared, in alphabetical order.
Party	Candidate	Background
Independent	Anthony Aitken	
Independent	Tony Ansett	Former Councillor
Labor	Robert Blaszczyk	
Independent	Ken Dickens	Owner of Corio Waste Management.
Independent	Jordan Grossman	Engineer at Ford Motor Company
Independent	Kylie Grzybek	Chief of Staff to transport Accident Commission CEO
Labor	Moshtagh Heidari	
Independent	Marina Kozul	Architect.
Greens	Greg Lacey	
Labor	David Withington	Public relations consultant

== Election timeline ==
26 September 2017: Candidate nominations close

3 October: Windermere candidates forum at 94.7 The Pulse

10 October: Brownbill candidates forum at 94.7 The Pulse

10–12 October: Ballot packs are mailed out in the days around 10–12 October 2017.

27 October: Postal voting closes

28 October: Election Day
