= Alec Sandner =

Australian politician and businessman

Mayor of the City of Greater Bendigo
- In office 2011–2012
- Preceded by: Rod Fyffe
- Succeeded by: Lisa Ruffell

Councillor of the City of Greater Bendigo for Flora Hill Ward
- In office 2008–2012
- Preceded by: Julie Rivendell
- Succeeded by: Ward Abolished

President of the Shire of Strathfieldsaye
- In office 1985–1986

Councillor of the Shire of Strathfieldsaye
- In office 1982–1987

Personal details
- Party: Liberal
- Spouse: Helen Sandner
- Children: 3

Alec Sandner is an Australian former politician and businessman who served as Mayor of the City of Greater Bendigo from 2011 to 2012 and as president of the Shire of Strathfieldsaye from 1985 to 1986. He served as a councillor of the City of Greater Bendigo from 2008 to 2012 and as a councillor for the Shire of Strathfieldsaye from 1982 to 1987.

== Political career ==
Sander was first elected to the Shire of Strathfieldsaye council in 1982, serving as shire president from 1985 until 1986. His term on the council finished in 1987.

Sandner was the Liberal Party candidate for Electoral district of Bendigo West in the 1985 Victorian state election but failed to defeat the incumbent David Kennedy, achieving 32.1% of the primary vote and 44.3% of the Two-party-preferred vote.

Sandner was elected to the City of Greater Bendigo council in the 2008 election in the Flora Hill Ward, achieving 21.60% of the primary vote and 57.51% of the two candidate preferred vote, defeating incumbent councilor and former mayor Julie Rivendell.

In 2011, Sandner was elected by the council as mayor, serving a one year term. Upon his election as mayor, Sandner stated “My objective is to lift the standing of the council. At the end of the term, I would like to see that the perception of the council, councillors and council offices has been lifted and more appreciated.”

Sander lost his seat at the 2012 election, achieving only 12.61% of the primary vote in the newly created Eppalock Ward. After his defeat he stated "I'm quite happy, I'll go to bed with probably a wine before I go, as usual, but it won't [be] anything, it won't be tears in a bucket, that's for sure."

Sandner contested the 2017 Greater Geelong City Council election but failed to be elected, achieving 6.01% of the vote in Brownbill ward.

== Personal life ==
Sander is the son of Eugene Carl Sandner, mayor of the City of Bendigo from 1978 to 1979.
