= Armstrong Creek, Victoria =

Coordinates: 38.235352°S 144.375613°E

Armstrong Creek Geelong, Victoria
- Population: 11,247 (2021 census)
- Postcode(s): 3217
- LGA(s): City of Greater Geelong
- State electorate(s): South Barwon
- Federal division(s): Corangamite
Suburbs around Armstrong Creek:
| Mount Duneed | Charlemont | Moolap |
| Mount Duneed | Armstrong Creek | Connewarre |
| Mount Duneed | Mount; Duneed and Connewarre | Connewarre |

Armstrong Creek is a suburb of Geelong, Victoria, Australia. It was gazetted in February 2012 as part of the Armstrong Creek Growth Area, and was mostly farm land which had been part of Connewarre and Mount Duneed. At the 2021 census, Armstrong Creek had a population of 11,247.

In August 2019, the City of Greater Geelong announced that, subject to final planning approval, construction of the sustainable Sparrovale Wetlands system, on the Barwon River floodplain, was to begin in October 2019, after council had awarded a $3.25 million contract to Goldsmith Civil and Environmental.

The suburb is also home to the newly constructed Biyal-a Armstrong Creek Library, a regional library and community hub which opened in August 2024.
