= Gala Day =

Annual festival in Geelong, Victoria, Australia

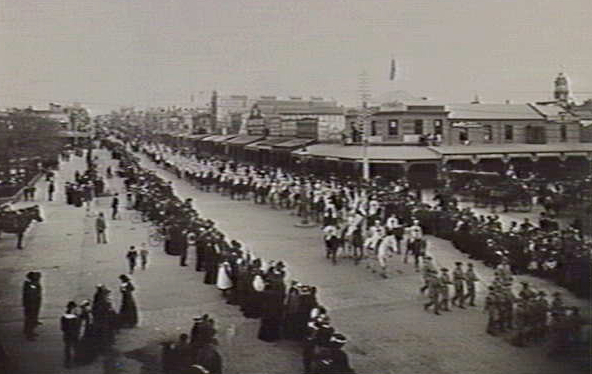
The first Gala Day in Geelong, November 1916

Gala Day was a one-day festival held in many towns over the world. One of the biggest was held in the city of Geelong, Victoria, Australia, running annually from 1916 until its permanent cancellation in 2023. The festival raised money for the Geelong Hospital, and was known for the street parade through central Geelong which featured local community groups, amusement rides in the main street, a sideshow alley, and showbag stalls.

== History ==
The first Gala Day was held on Friday, 3 November 1916, at the height of World War I, to raise money for the Red Cross Society. Described by the Geelong Advertiser as "the biggest fete the city had ever seen, the most perfectly planned function, the gayest spectacle, and the highest in patriotic purpose", the first parade raised £5,500 (equivalent to A$627,198 in 2022) – a staggering amount for the day. After the success of the first festival, Gala Day was adopted as an annual event, the second festival being held on 2 November 1917. It was not until 1927 that the Geelong Hospital took over responsibility for running the festival. The festival was traditionally held on a Friday, and students at local schools were given a holiday. From 2006, the festival was changed, being renamed the Gala Appeal "Family Fun Day" and moved to the first week of December. The festival was then held in Johnstone Park. In 2008, the event was again changed, with the Gala Day Parade and Family Fun Day moved to a Saturday. Schools, community groups, and corporate groups could enter a float in the parade. The Family Fun Day returned to the city's spectacular waterfront at Steampacket Gardens, featuring market and food stalls, rides, show bags, and roving performances from local artists. The 2020 and 2021 Gala Days were held virtually due to the COVID-19 pandemic. In 2023, the Barwon Health Foundation announced the permanent cancellation of the Gala Day due to escalating costs and diminished sponsorships.
