= City of Greater Geelong =

Coordinates: 38°09′00″S 144°21′00″E

- Local government area
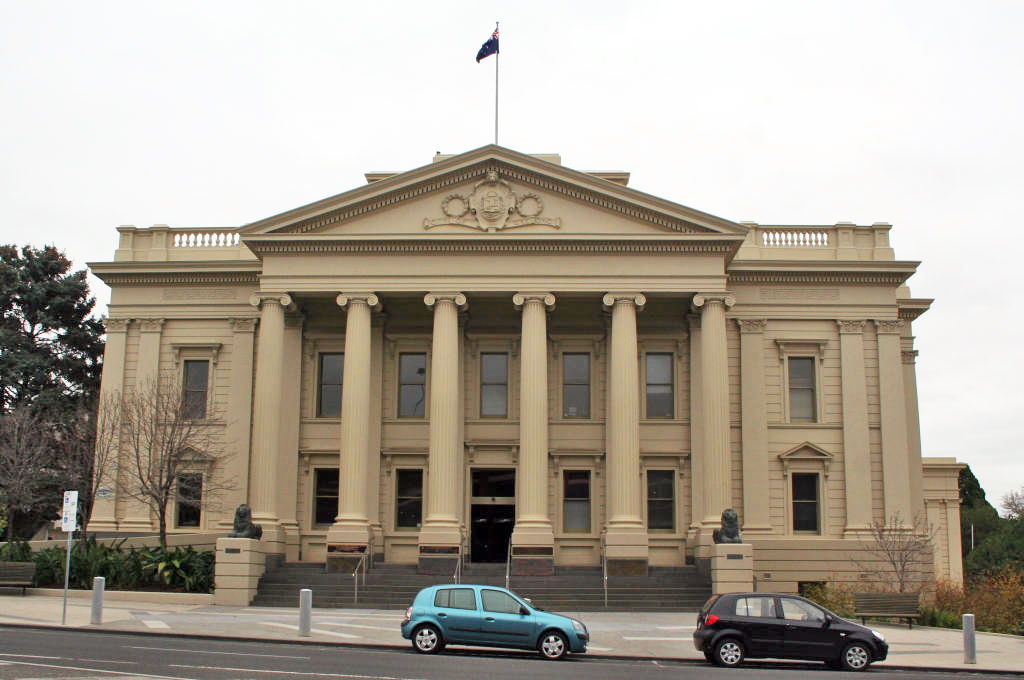
- Geelong Town Hall, 2007

- Interactive map of City of Greater Geelong
- Country: Australia
- State: Victoria
- Region: Barwon South West
- Established: 1993
- Council seat: Geelong city centre

Government
  - Mayor: Stretch Kontelj
  - State electorates: Bellarine; Geelong; Lara; South Barwon
  - Federal divisions: Corangamite; Corio

Area
  - Total: 1,248 km^{2} (482 sq mi)

Population
  - Total: 271,057 (2021) (12th)
  - Density: 217.19/km^{2} (562.53/sq mi)
- Gazetted: 18 May 1993
- Website: City of Greater Geelong
LGAs around City of Greater Geelong
Golden Plains	Moorabool	Wyndham
Golden Plains	City of Greater Geelong	Port Phillip Bay
Surf Coast	Bass Strait	Queenscliffe

The City of Greater Geelong is a local government area in the Barwon South West region of Victoria, Australia, located in the western part of the state. It covers an area of 1,248 square kilometres (482 mi^{2}) and, had a population of 271,057 as of the 2021 Australian census. It is primarily urban with the vast majority of its population living in the Greater Geelong urban area, while other significant settlements within the LGA include Anakie, Balliang, Barwon Heads, Batesford, Ceres, Clifton Springs, Drysdale, Lara, Ocean Grove, Portarlington and St Leonards. It was formed in 1993 from the amalgamation of the Rural City of Bellarine, Shire of Corio, City of Geelong, City of Geelong West, City of Newtown, City of South Barwon, and parts of Shire of Barrabool and Shire of Bannockburn.

The city is governed and administered by the Greater Geelong City Council; its seat of local government and administrative centre is located at the council headquarters in Geelong, it also has service centres located in Drysdale, Ocean Grove and several other locations within Geelong. It is headed by the mayor of Greater Geelong. The city is named after the main urban settlement located in the centre-west of the LGA, that is Geelong, which is also the LGA's most populous urban centre with a population of 211,986.

In 2019, City of Greater Geelong announced a new headquarters across the road from WorkSafe Victoria. This project, known as the Wurriki Nyal Civic Precinct, was completed in 2022.

== History of former municipalities ==
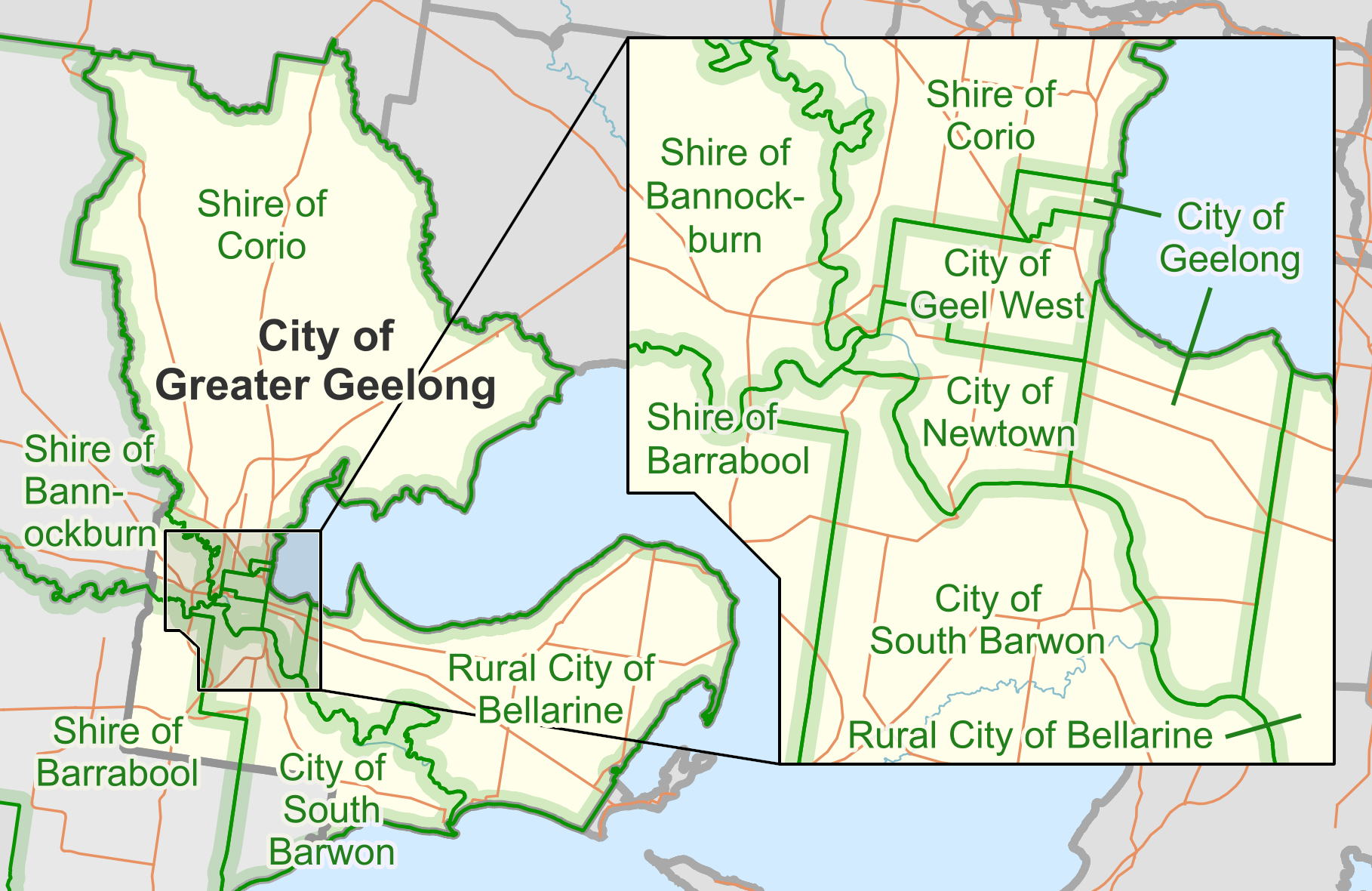
Greater Geelong's predecessor LGAs (green) as they were in 1992

- 1838 – Geelong (from the Indigenous Wadawurrung word "djillong", meaning "tongue of land") declared a town
- 1849 – Geelong incorporated as a Town
- 1853 – Barrabool road district proclaimed
- 1853 – Portarlington Road District proclaimed
- 1856 – Connewarre Road District proclaimed
- 1857 – South Barwon Municipal District proclaimed
- 1857 – South Barwon Road District proclaimed
- 1858 – Newtown and Chilwell borough proclaimed
- 1860 – Portarlington Road District renamed as Indented Head Road District
- 1861 – Corio Road District proclaimed
- 1862 – Bannockburn Road District proclaimed
- 1863 – Meredith Road District proclaimed
- 1863 – Queenscliff and Point Lonsdale separated from Indented Head Road District to form Queenscliffe Municipal District. Redesignated as Queenscliffe Borough October 1963.
- 1863 – South Barwon Borough created by amalgamating South Barwon Municipal District and South Barwon Road District
- 1864 – Bannockburn Road District redesignated as Shire
- 1864 – Corio Road District redesignated as Shire
- 1865 – Indented Head Road District redesignated and renamed as Bellarine Shire
- 1874 – South Barwon Shire created by amalgamating Connewarre Road District and South Barwon Borough
- 1875 – Geelong West Borough proclaimed
- 1910 – Geelong proclaimed a City
- 1915 – Meredith Shire added to Bannockburn Shire
- 1922 – Geelong West proclaimed a Town
- 1924 – Newtown and Chilwell proclaimed a Town
- 1929 – Geelong West proclaimed a City
- 1959 – Newtown and Chilwell proclaimed a City
- 1967 – Newtown and Chilwell City renamed as Newtown City
- 1974 – South Barwon proclaimed a City
- 1989 – Bellarine proclaimed a Rural City
- 1993 (18 May) – The City of Greater Geelong was formed by amalgamating part of Bannockburn Shire, part of Barrabool Shire, Bellarine Rural City, Corio Shire, Geelong City, Newtown City and South Barwon City. The City's original boundaries included Torquay and Jan Juc.
- 1994 (March) – The Torquay district was transferred to Surf Coast Shire upon its creation.

Sourced from Appendix V, A Journey to Destiny 1890–1990 – 100 Years of Cement Manufacturing at Fyansford by Australian Cement Limited .

== Council ==
=== Council composition (as of 2025) ===
Since 2024, councillors of Greater Geelong have been elected from eleven single-member wards.

Ward	Party	Councillor	Notes
Barrabool Hills	Independent Liberal	Ron Nelson	
Charlemont	Independent	Emma Sinclair	
Cheetham	Independent Labor	Melissa Cadwell	
Connewarre	Independent	Elise Wilkinson	
Corio	Independent	Anthony Aitken	
Deakin	Independent Liberal	Andrew Katos	
Hamlyn Heights	Independent	Eddy Kontelj	Deputy Mayor
Kardinia	Independent Liberal	Stretch Kontelj	Mayor
Leopold	Independent Liberal	Trent Sullivan	
Murradoc	Independent Liberal	Rowan Story	
You Yangs	One Nation	Chris Burson	

== Election results ==
=== 2024 ===
2024 Victorian local elections: Greater Geelong
Party	Votes	%	Swing	Seats	Change
Independents	76,564	46.17	+10.65	6	▲2
Independent Liberal	49,653	29.94	+3.48	4	Steady
Independent Labor	19,238	11.60	−3.97	1	Steady
Greens	13,890	8.38	−1.99	0	▼1
Socialist Alliance	6,500	3.92	+1.31	0	Steady
Formal votes	165,845	96.92	+1.26		
Informal votes	5,276	3.08	−1.26		
Total	171,121	100.00		11	Steady
Registered voters / turnout	205,894	83.11	−1.26		

=== 2020 ===
2020 Victorian local elections: Greater Geelong
Party	Votes	%	Swing	Seats	Change
Independent	58,513	35.52		4	
Independent Liberal	43,263	26.46		4	
Independent Labor	25,648	15.57		1	
Greens	17,081	10.37		1	
Put Climate First	12,518	7.60	+7.60	1	▲1
Socialist Alliance	4,292	2.61		0	Steady
Animal Justice	3,408	2.07		0	Steady
Formal votes	164,723				
Informal votes	7,474				
Total	172,197	100.00		11	
Registered voters / turnout	204,092	84.37			

== Administrators ==
In December 2015, the Minister for Local Government Natalie Hutchins appointed a Commission of Inquiry into the Greater Geelong City Council in response to concerns about the workplace culture and adequacy of governance structures.

The Inquiry found that the council is riven with conflict, unable to manage Geelong's economic challenges, has dysfunctional leadership and has a culture of bullying.

On the recommendation of the commission, the Victoria State Government dismissed the entire Greater Geelong City Council on 16 April 2016 and appointed Yehudi Blacher as interim administrator. On 25 May 2016, Dr Kathy Alexander (chairperson), Peter Dorling and Laurinda Gardner were sworn in as administrators, replacing Yehudi Blacher.

Under the Local Government (Greater Geelong City Council) Act 2016, the panel of administrators constitutes the Greater Geelong City Council, and has the same functions, powers and duties as the Greater Geelong City Council and its councillors. Likewise, the chairperson of the panel of administrators has the same functions, powers and duties as the mayor of the council.

The council was run by administrators until fresh council elections were held on 27 October 2017.

City of Greater Geelong and urban areas including Geelong

=== Former and current Mayors ===
- Gerry Smith (1995–1998)
- Ken Jarvis (1998–2000)
- Michael Crutchfield (2000–2001)
- Stretch Kontelj (2001–2002)
- Barbara Abley (2002–2004)
- Ed Coppe (2004)
- Shane Dowling (2004–2005)
- Peter McMullin (2005–2006)
- Bruce Harwood (2006–2008)
- John Mitchell (2008–2012)
- Keith Fagg (2012–2013)
- Darryn Lyons (2013–2016)
- Bruce Harwood (2017–2019)
- Stephanie Asher (2019–2022)
- Peter Murrihy (2022–2022)
- Trent Sullivan (2022–2024)
- Stretch Kontelj (2024-incumbent)

=== Former and current Deputy Mayors ===
- Tony Ansett (2003–2004)
- John Mitchell (2007–2008)
- Rod Macdonald (2008–2009)
- Bruce Harwood (2009–2010)
- Cameron Granger (2010–2012)
- Stretch Kontelj (2012–2013)
- Bruce Harwood (2013–2014)
- Michelle Heagney (2014–2016)
- Peter Murrihy (2017–2019)
- Kylie Grzybek (2019–2020)
- Trent Sullivan (2020–2022)
- Anthony Aitken (2022–2024)
- Ron Nelson (2024-2026)
- Eddy Kontelj (2026-incumbent)

=== Administration and governance ===
The council meets in the council chambers at the council headquarters in the Geelong City Hall Offices, which is also the location of the council's administrative activities. Council customer service centres are located in Belmont, Corio, Drysdale, Geelong West, Ocean Grove, Waurn Ponds and at Brougham St in Geelong.

== Townships and localities ==
The 2021 census, the city had a population of 271,057 up from 233,429 in the 2016 census

Population
Locality	2006	2011	2016	2021
Anakie^	676	603	690	734
Armstrong Creek	#	#	4,247	11,247
Avalon	#	306	293	255
Balliang^	232	241	290	254
Barwon Heads	2,997	3,536	3,875	4,353
Batesford^	879	740	952	1,141
Bell Park	4,650	5,287	5,009	5,602
Bell Post Hill	4,919	5,009	4,919	5,083
Bellarine	#	#	169	169
Belmont	13,645	13,617	14,054	15,066
Breakwater	1,049	1,060	1,014	1,060
Breamlea^	242	444	162	151
Ceres	#	237	254	266
Charlemont	#	#	364	2,612
Clifton Springs	7,065	7,154	7,519	7,646
Connewarre^	75	351	788	953
Corio	14,919	15,074	15,296	15,497
Curlewis	396	225	1,551	4,175
Drumcondra	601	614	560	571
Drysdale	3,738	4,317	4,275	4,976
East Geelong	3,829	3,862	3,862	4,012
Fyansford	172	188	196	1,206
Geelong	4,359	4,699	5,210	5,811
Geelong West	6,302	6,681	6,966	7,345
Grovedale	13,184	14,153	14,308	14,869
Hamlyn Heights	5,842	6,074	6,293	6,518
Herne Hill	3,268	3,322	3,413	3,507
Highton	14,492	16,656	18,953	20,736
Indented Head	590	920	1,133	1,391
Lara	12,853	13,844	16,355	19,014
Leopold	8,748	10,112	12,814	13,272
Little River^	1,750	1,395	1,322	1,353
Lovely Banks	1,007	2,219	2,301	2,782
Manifold Heights	2,550	2,605	2,649	2,681
Mannerim	#	188	88	108
Marcus Hill	277	181	159	164
Marshall	841	1,798	1,885	2,299
Moolap	692	1,108	1,373	1,825
Moorabool	#	184	90	94
Mount Duneed^	983	623	1,578	6,182
Newcomb	4,503	4,520	4,500	4,704
Newtown	9,578	9,680	10,148	10,445
Norlane	7,933	8,014	8,306	8,682
North Geelong	2,670	2,394	2,966	3,225
North Shore	321	354	357	325
Ocean Grove	11,276	12,556	14,165	17,714
Point Lonsdale^	2,477	2,466	2,684	3,788
Point Wilson	#	#	0	0
Portarlington	3,020	3,581	3,619	4,436
Rippleside	353	439	875	994
South Geelong	852	906	993	1,014
St Albans Park	4,696	4,923	4,843	4,942
St Leonards	1,623	2,001	2,480	3,542
Staughton Vale	#	#	98	105
Swan Bay	#	#	59	103
Thomson	1,610	1,533	1,607	1,606
Wallington	1,351	1,294	1,364	1,515
Wandana Heights	1,831	1,958	2,037	2,195
Waurn Ponds	2,328	3,993	5,046	4,956
Whittington	4,053	4,157	3,879	3,990

^ - Territory divided with another LGA
# - Not noted in Census

== Sister cities ==
Geelong has sister city relations with the following cities:

- Izumiōtsu, Japan (established 1992)
- Lianyungang, China (established 1994)

== See also ==
- List of mayors of Geelong
- List of Geelong suburbs
- List of localities in Victoria
