= Leopold, Victoria =

Leopold
- Suburb
- Interactive map of Leopold
- Coordinates: 38°11′21″S 144°27′52″E
- Country: Australia
- State: Victoria
- City: Geelong
- LGA: City of Greater Geelong
- Location: 86 km (53 mi) SW of Melbourne; 11 km (6.8 mi) E of Geelong; 14 km (8.7 mi) NW of Ocean Grove; 11 km (6.8 mi) W of Drysdale

Government
  - State electorate: Bellarine
  - Federal division: Corangamite

Population
  - Total: 12,814 (2016 census)
- Postcode: 3224
Suburbs around Leopold
Moolap	Corio Bay (Outer Harbour)	Corio Bay (Outer Harbour)
Moolap	Leopold	Curlewis
Connewarre	Connewarre	Wallington

Leopold is a residential eastern suburb of Geelong and is a gateway to the Bellarine Peninsula in the Australian state of Victoria. At the 2016 census, Leopold had a population of 13,272.

== History ==
The area was formerly known as Kensington, but was renamed in 1892 after Prince Leopold, Duke of Albany, the youngest son of Queen Victoria. The post office opened as Kensington on 19 May 1858, and was renamed Kensington Hill in 1882, Leopold Hill in 1884 and Leopold in 1885.

=== Heritage listed sites ===
Leopold contains a number of heritage listed sites, including:

- 221-229 Matthews Road, Melaleuka
- 715-729 Bellarine Highway, St Marks On The Hill

== Today ==
The Bellarine Rail Trail passes through Leopold. The Gateway Plaza is situated on the corner of the Bellarine Peninsula and Melaluka road.

Leopold is constructing four new residential developments called the Kensington Estate, the Estuary Estate, the Debonair Heights Estate and the Gateway Estate. Much of the available land has been sold. Houses are either in construction or others near finished.

The town has an Australian rules football team competing in the Geelong Football League known as the Lions.

Local soccer club FC Leopold has seniors and junior teams playing in Football Victoria Geelong leagues.

The Leopold Sportsmans Club provides bowls green, squash, function rooms and other facilities.

Leopold is also home to Lake Connewarre—a Ramsar listed estuary.

The town has a tennis club featuring 8 hard courts that competes in Geelong regional competitions.

== Education ==
As of 2012, Leopold consists of four sources of education.

- Leopold Primary School
- Leopold Kindergarten
- Allanvale Preschool Centre

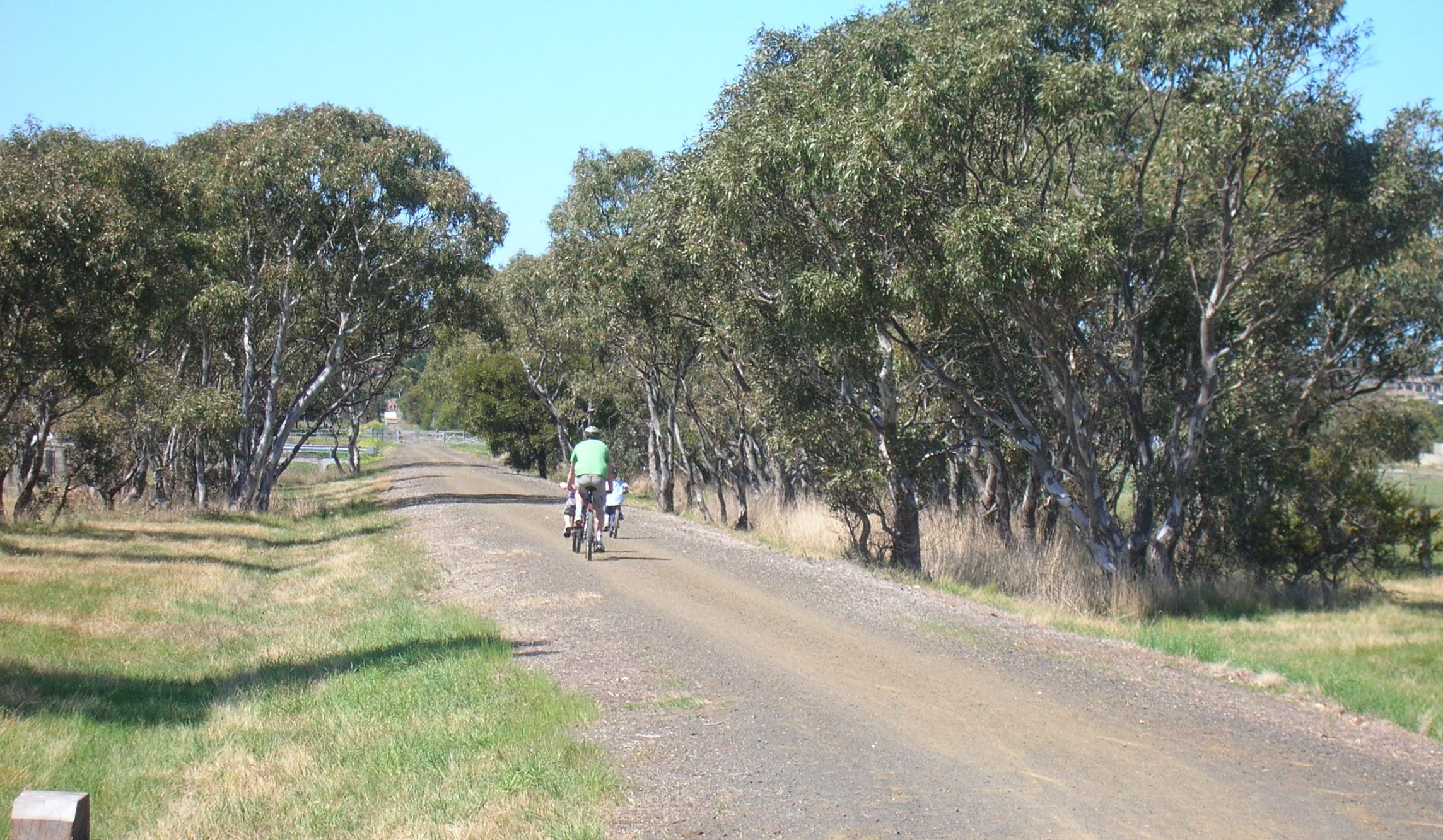
The Bellarine Rail Trail as it approaches Leopold from the west.
