= Curlewis, Victoria =

Curlewis Geelong, Victoria
- Coordinates: 38°11′S 144°30′E
- Population: 4,175 (2021 census)
- Postcode(s): 3222
- LGA(s): City of Greater Geelong
- State electorate(s): Bellarine
- Federal division(s): Corangamite
Suburbs around Curlewis:
Corio Bay (Outer Harbour)	Corio Bay (Outer Harbour)	Clifton Springs
Leopold	Curlewis	Drysdale
Leopold	Wallington	Wallington

Curlewis is a locality in the City of Greater Geelong local government area on the Bellarine Peninsula, Victoria, Australia. At the 2021 census, Curlewis had a population of 4,175.

Its surrounding suburbs are Drysdale, Clifton Springs, Leopold and Wallington, with waterfront access to Port Phillip Bay to the north.

== History ==
Curlewis Post Office opened on 1 November 1866 and closed in 1973. In 1900 the area had its own football team. Coriyule Homestead, located in McDermott Road, is listed on the Victorian Heritage Register.

== Today ==
The suburb of Curlewis underwent significant growth in 2010 when the Curlewis Urban Growth Area began construction. This development includes Bayview on the Bellarine, Curlewis Parks, Baywater Estate, Bellaview Estate and Coriyule Estate. Over 650 lots have been developed to date in the Jetty Road Urban Growth Area.

Centennial Boulevard is home to the Curlewis shopping centre which features Woolworths, a medical centre, pharmacy and other shops. This is located within the Neighbourhood Activity Centre with a proposed total of 7000sqm of retail space, a community centre and childcare service.

In the east of the suburb there is the new Percy Cherry Park, adjacent to Griggs Creek which flows past Clifton Springs Primary School into the bay. To the south of Curlewis is the Bellarine Rail Trail. Golfers play at the Curlewis Golf Club on Portarlington Road.
