= Clifton Springs, Victoria =

Clifton Springs
- Town
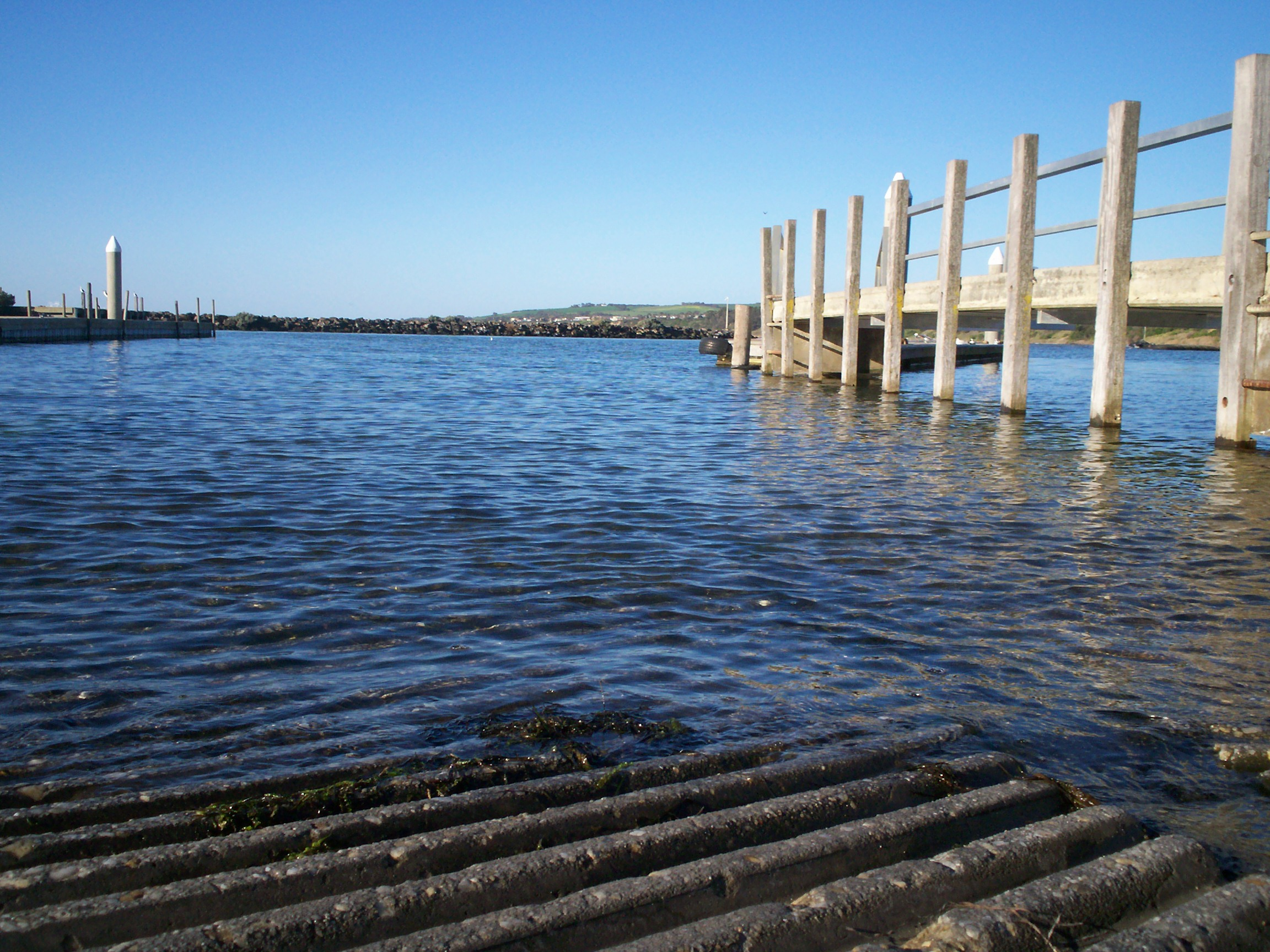
- The Clifton Springs jetty, 2007

- Coordinates: 38°09′S 144°34′E
- Country: Australia
- State: Victoria
- LGA: City of Greater Geelong
- Location: 97 km (60 mi) SW of Melbourne; 22 km (14 mi) E of Geelong; 10 km (6.2 mi) SW of Portarlington

Government
  - State electorate: Bellarine
  - Federal division: Corangamite

Population
  - Total: 7,519 (2016 census)
- Postcode: 3222
Localities around Clifton Springs
Corio Bay (Outer Harbour)	Corio Bay (Outer Harbour)	Bellarine
Curlewis	Clifton Springs	Drysdale
Curlewis	Drysdale	Drysdale

Clifton Springs is a town located on the Bellarine Peninsula, near Geelong, Victoria, Australia.

== History ==
In December 1870, a report was published regarding the discovery of mineral springs on "Clifton", the property of Thomas Bates Jnr The medicinal value of the waters was submitted to rigid chemical examination, and summarised as containing magnesia, seltzer, sulphur, soda and iron.

In about 1871, Bates leased the land adjacent to the Springs to Mr Levien, a large landholder at nearby Murradoc, who created a pleasure ground, and Clifton Springs boomed. A pier was built, along with salt water and sulphur baths. Steamers ran excursions from Geelong and other places, and regular coach services were provided by Cobb & Co from nearby Portarlington and Drysdale. Other buildings, including a boiler house, mineral water bottling plant, kiosk, and manager's cottage were built in the vicinity of what became known as "Fairy Dell".

A well-appointed hotel was constructed above the Springs. It was destroyed by fire in 1921, and a second one was built in 1926, which was remodelled as the Clifton Springs Country Club in about 1957, as part of a real estate development. It became the Clifton Springs Community Centre in 1977 when the building was purchased by the then Shire of Bellarine.

A Clifton Springs post office was open from 1902 until 1921, and from 1927 until 1932. Fairy Dell post office opened on 1 July 1916 and closed in 1971.

The springs area, located around Fairy Dell, was closed due to possible landslides, but was re-opened in 2007 after extensive work to repair the area.

The former mineral springs site on Spring Street is listed on the Victorian Heritage Register.

== Town overview ==
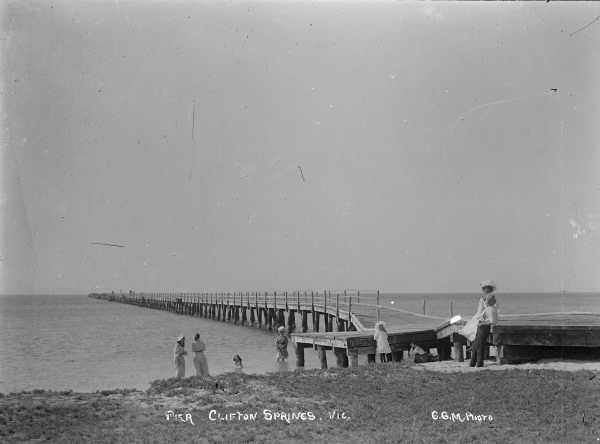
Clifton Springs pier, 1910s

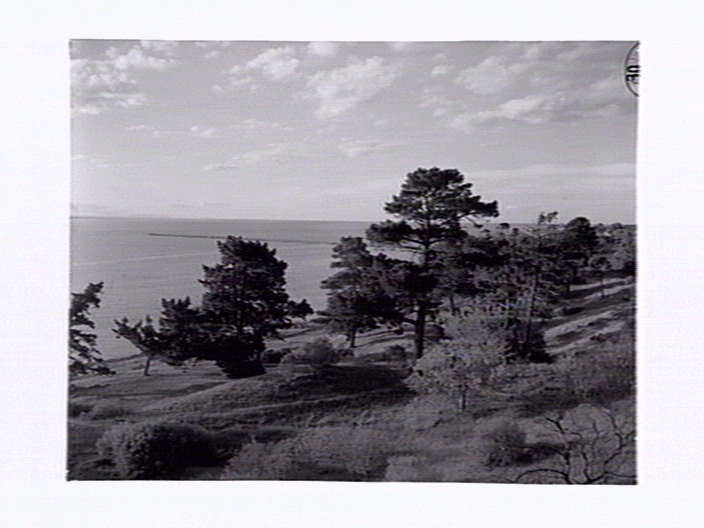
Clifton Springs, overlooking the pier, 1955

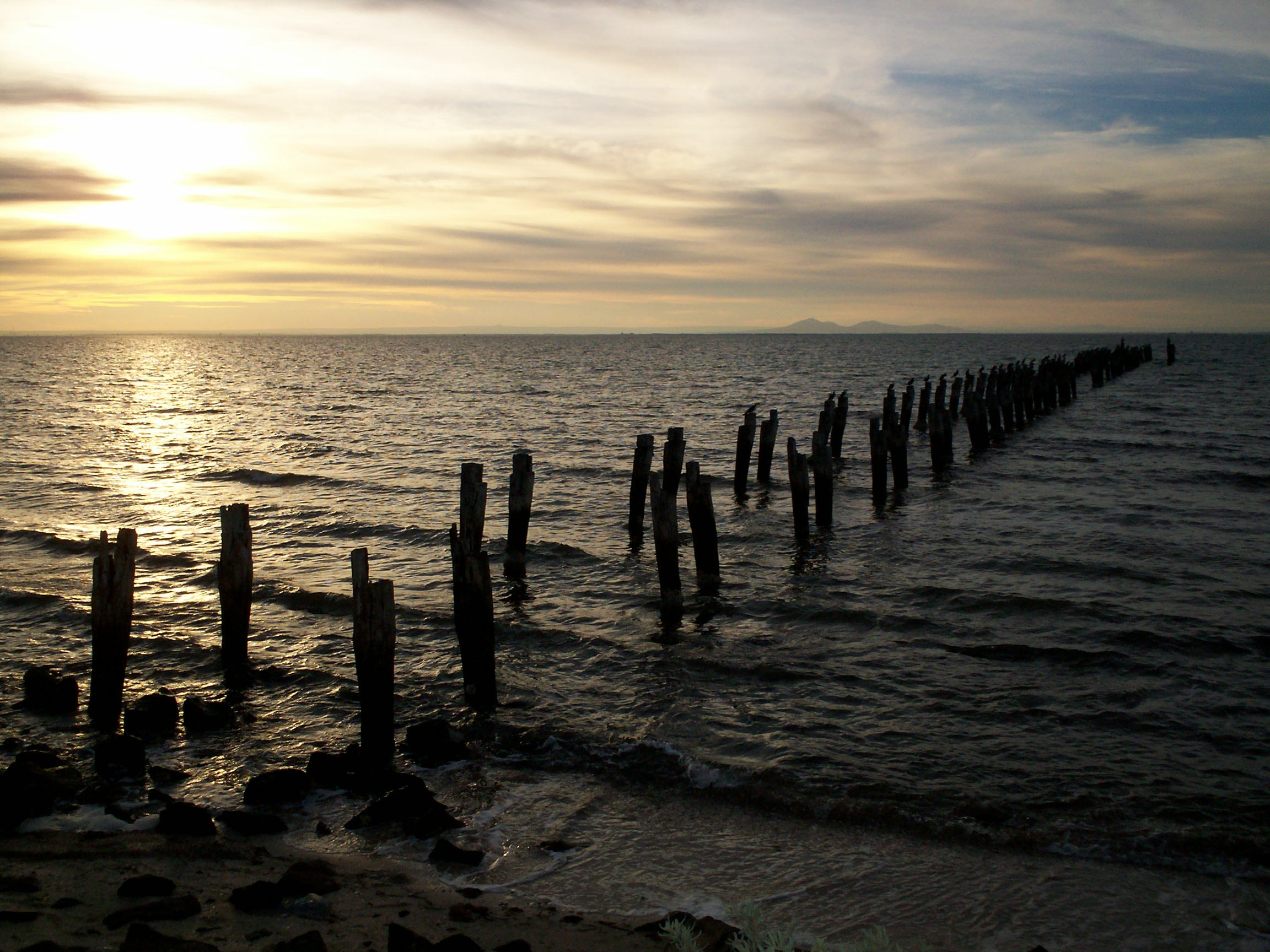
Clifton Springs pier, 2007

Clifton Springs, often grouped with its neighbouring town, Drysdale, overlooks Corio Bay, the You Yangs and Geelong. This combined urban area had an estimated population of 13,494 at June 2016. The area has undergone significant changes over the past decade, with new housing developments on the north side of the town.

In the early 1960s, real estate developers Willmore and Randell acquired 1,300 acres (530 ha) in Clifton Springs, with a 2-mile (3.2 km) frontage to Corio Bay. The developers engaged Victor Gruen and Associates, noted US planners of shopping centres and resorts, to design a country club estate with 5000 house lots, which they dubbed "Clifton Springs and Country Club Estate". A striking entrance structure to the estate was erected in Bayshore Avenue, which included a fountain, which eventually passed to the control of the Greater Geelong Council. The fountain degraded over time and, in late 2006, it was emptied until further notice, due to water restrictions.

In 2013, a Clifton Springs fountain working group reported that locals wanted something done about the fountain's gradual deterioration. They felt it has been neglected for too long and were concerned that it was becoming an eyesore. A public meeting on 12 March expressed general support for renovating the structure, using an enclosed, non-evaporative system, which would use much less water. The renovation would include symbols of the area’s past and possible futures, linking the fountain with some of the public art at The Dell, and evoking the time when mineral water was exported from Clifton Springs.

Local councillor Lindsay Ellis told the working group that a report on the fountain's condition, with an estimate of the cost of refurbishing it, was due from council officers on 23 April, and that he Greater Geelong Council would consider the fountain's future as part of the process of formulating the council's 2013/14 budget.

The Clifton Springs Golf Club is entered from Clearwater Drive.

Clifton Springs Primary School, situated in Jetty Road, was established in 1989. It had an enrolment of approximately 280 students in 2015, which had grown to about 450 students in 2024.

== The Inbetweeners reference ==
The town gained a modest cult following among fans of the late 2000s British coming-of-age television teen sitcom The Inbetweeners. In the first episode of the first series, Jay Cartwright (played by James Buckley) attempts to buy drinks at a pub while underage, using a fake Victorian driver's licence belonging to Bret Clement, which lists an address on Whitcombes Road in Clifton Springs. His incredibly poor, yet likely recognisable, Australian accent adds to the humour of the scene, and ultimately he succeeds in buying himself a pint.

== Census populations ==
- 1911 – 50
- 1966 – 146
- 1976 – 1,049
- 1986 – 3,657
- 1991 – 5,847
- 2006 – 7,063
- 2011 – 7,153
- 2016 – 7,519

In the 2016 Census, there were 7,519 people in Clifton Springs, of whom 79.4% were born in Australia. The next most common country of birth was England at 5.8%. 91.1% of people spoke only English at home. The most common responses for religion were No Religion 35.4%, Catholic 22.8% and Anglican 13.5%.

The population was expected to grow to more than 9,000 residents by the year 2020.
