= Moolap, Victoria =

Coordinates: 38°11′S 144°26′E

Moolap
- Suburb
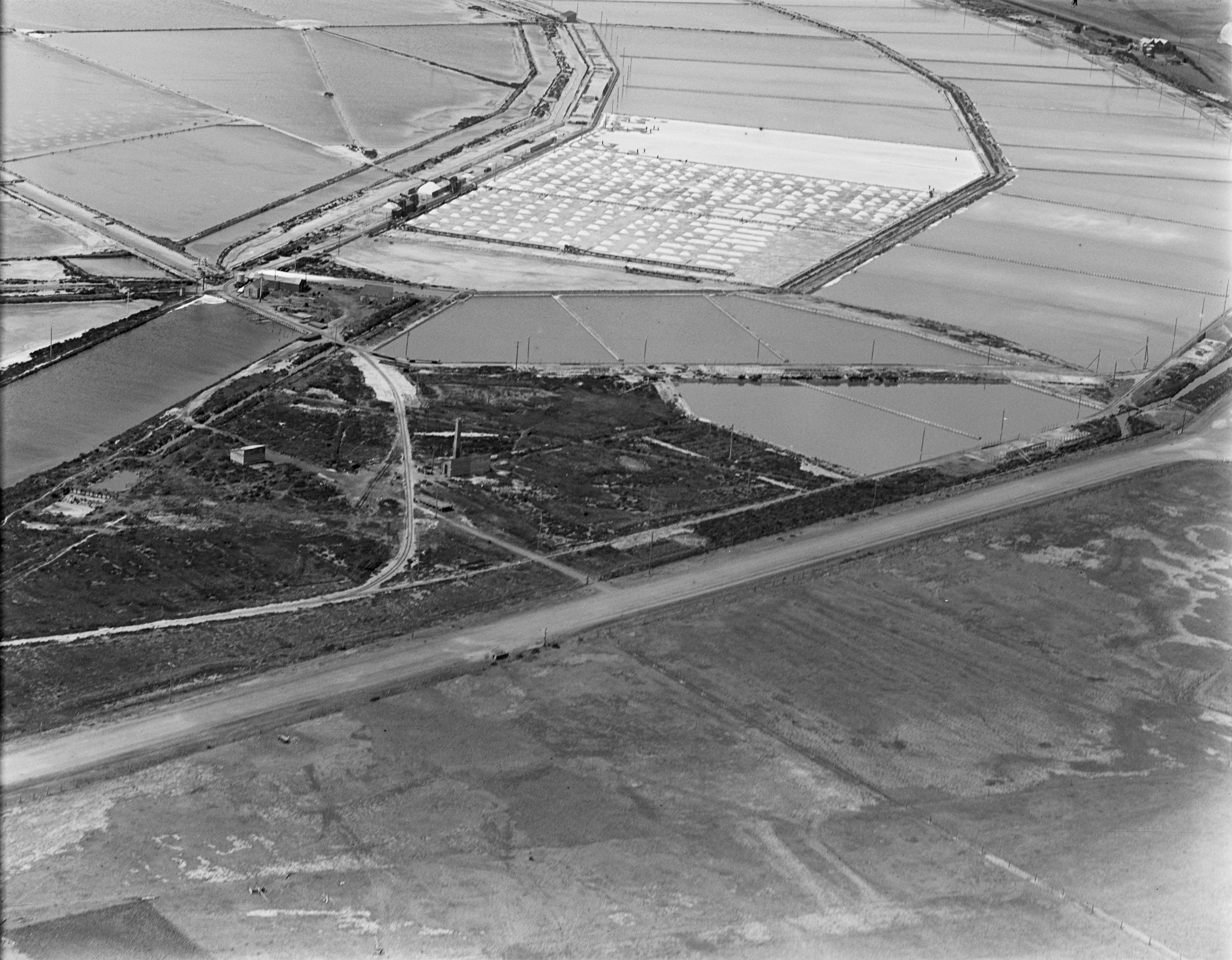
- Salt pans at the Cheetham Saltworks.
- Interactive map of Moolap
- Country: Australia
- State: Victoria
- City: Geelong
- LGA: City of Greater Geelong

Government
  - State electorate: Geelong
  - Federal division: Corangamite

Population
  - Total: 1,373 (2016 census)
- Postcode: 3224
Suburbs around Moolap
Newcomb	Corio Bay	Port Phillip
Whittington and St Albans Park	Moolap	Leopold
Charlemont	Armstrong Creek and Connewarre	Leopold

Moolap (/ˈmuːlæp/) is a residential and industrial suburb of Geelong, Victoria, Australia. The name Moolap is derived from an Aboriginal word for nearby Point Henry, moo-laa, thought to mean 'men gathering to go fishing'.

Moolap is located in the City of Greater Geelong. At the 2016 census Moolap had a population of 1,373.

== History ==
Among the first settlers in the area, in the early 1850s, was politician Horatio Wills and his family, including son Tom Wills, star cricketer and founder of Australian rules football.

The first Moolap Post Office opened on 1 May 1864 and closed in 1890. A Point Henry Post Office opened on 1 January 1867 which was replaced by Moolap Railway Station in 1887 and by Moolap in 1893. This latter office closed in 1962. A Geelong East office open since 1871 was renamed Moolap West in 1921 and closed in 1951.

In 1888, Richard Cheetham established his saltworks at Moolap - an industry which survived more than 100 years. The Cheetham Saltworks site, located on Portarlington and Point Henry Roads, is listed on the Victorian Heritage Register.

== Timeline ==
Some events in the history of Moolap:

Pre-European Settlement the area inhabited by Bengalat balug (Clan) of the Wathaurong Tribe

First European explorers were Lieutenant John Murray (January 1802) and Captain Matthew Flinders (April 1802)

1803 to 1835 - William Buckley the first European living in the area

1854 - Whitehorse Hotel operating on the corner of Queenscliff Road and Whitehorse Road

1855 - Moolap Inn operating on the corner of Moolap Station Road and Bellarine Highway

1855 - Parsonage built on a site near the present State School

1858 - United Methodists Free Church chapel built

1871 - Moolap State School No. 1143 opened

1882 - 16 occupiers using Moolap address

1888 - Cheetham Saltworks established

== Point Henry ==
Point Henry is an industrial peninsula of Geelong, located approximately 5 km east of the Geelong central business district. Only one sealed road leads to Point Henry, being Point Henry Road which leaves the Portarlington Road at Moolap and travels to the Alcoa Point Henry aluminium smelter and smaller surrounding industries. A small weather station is also located on the peninsula. Point Henry is named after Henry Reed's boat Henry.

== Census population ==
- 1921 - 319
- 1947 - 651
- 1991 - 565
- 1996 - 568
- 2001 - 554
