= Portarlington, Victoria =

Portarlington
- Town
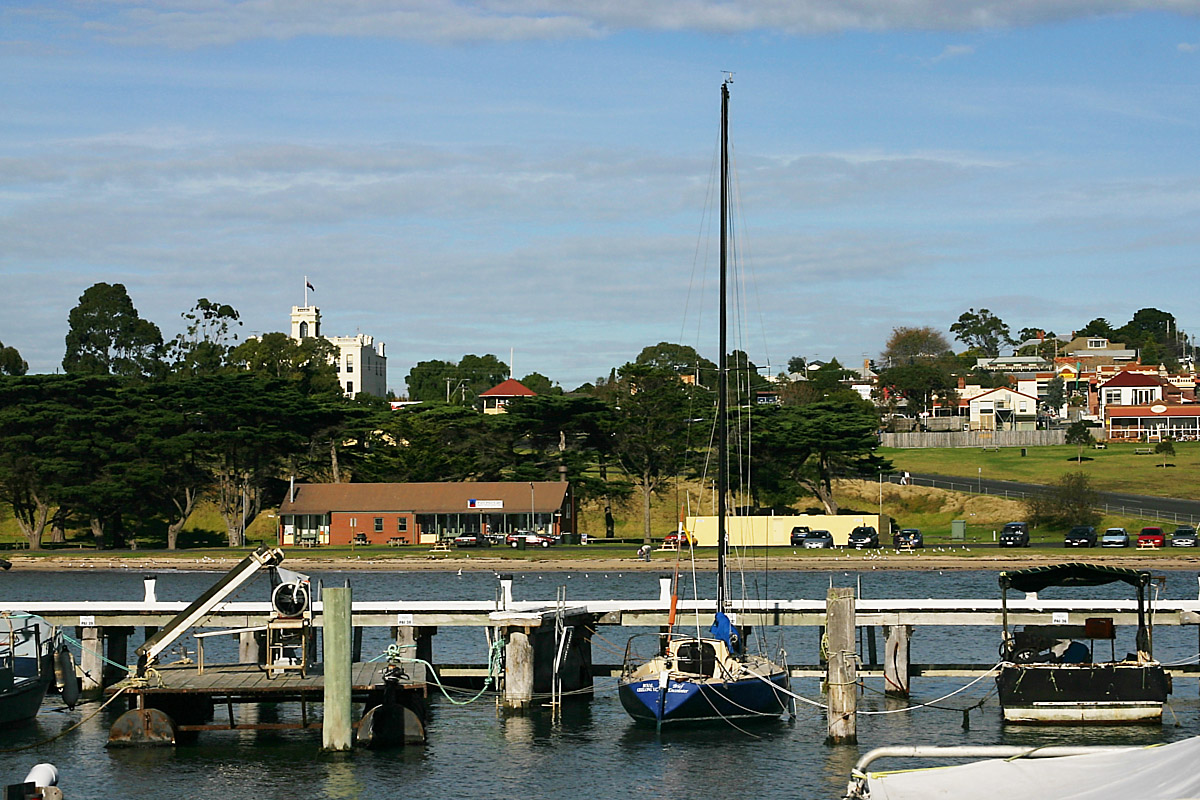
- Portarlington seen from the town's pier

- Coordinates: 38°07′0″S 144°39′0″E
- Country: Australia
- State: Victoria
- City: Geelong
- LGA: City of Greater Geelong
- Location: 99 km (62 mi) from Melbourne; 28 km (17 mi) from Geelong

Government
  - State electorate: Bellarine
  - Federal division: Corangamite

Population
  - Total: 4,436 (2021 census)
- Postcode: 3223
Localities around Portarlington
Port Phillip	Port Phillip	Port Phillip
Bellarine	Portarlington	Indented Head
Drysdale	St Leonards	St Leonards

Portarlington is a town located on the Bellarine Peninsula, 28 km from the city of Geelong, in the state of Victoria, Australia. It has a diverse population which includes a wide range of ethnic backgrounds, a high proportion of retirees, and a large seasonal holiday influx. The gently rising hills behind the town feature vineyards and olive groves, and offer spectacular panoramic views across Port Phillip Bay. Portarlington is a popular family holiday destination and a centre of fishing and aquaculture (mussels). At one time the town claimed the largest caravan park in the Southern Hemisphere, although the size has reduced considerably in recent decades. With direct ferry links to the city of Melbourne Portarlington also serves as a gateway to the historic towns and surf beaches of the Bellarine Peninsula.

== History ==
=== Early Inhabitants ===
The area around Portarlington was originally inhabited by the Aboriginal Wathaurung people. Aboriginal shell middens can be found along the cliff-line at Portarlington. Mussels are the dominant shell species in evidence, demonstrating the importance of mussels to the area, even in prehistoric times. A ground-edged stone axe has been found at Portarlington. A stone artifact scatter also existed at a nearby site, but has been destroyed by development. Another stone artifact scatter has been identified at Point Richards, in the west of the town.

=== European discovery and exploration ===
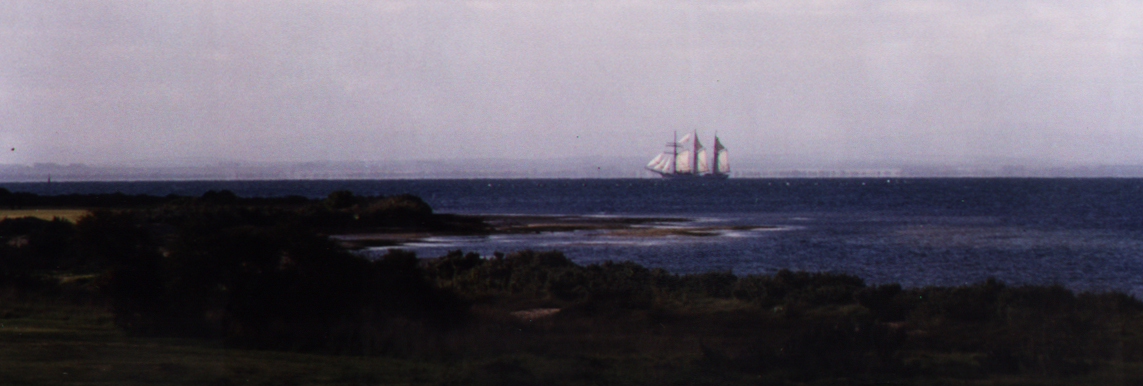
The schooner Alma Doppel sailing off Grassy Point at Portarlington in 1997.

The Port Phillip area was first significantly explored by Europeans in January 1802, when Lieutenant John Murray spent three weeks investigating the Bay entrance. He does not appear to have landed at Portarlington. Ten weeks later, the English explorer, Matthew Flinders, camped at Indented Head, 6 km to the south-east of Portarlington, where he traded with Aboriginal inhabitants while undertaking a survey of the Australian coastline. He subsequently landed several times briefly on the peninsula coast to take bearings, including at the location of Portarlington (where he shared lunch with Aboriginal people), and also at Point Richards. In February 1803, the Surveyor-General Charles Grimes landed from his ship, the Cumberland, at Portarlington with an expedition and spent several days exploring the Bay coastline to Point Cook. They were impressed by the fine pasture and soil in the Bellarine Hills. They sailed back from Point Cook to Portarlington and landed again, where they were met by Aboriginals. They traded food and utensils, however other provisions were stolen from their boat in their absence. Some evidence of smallpox among the locals was noted at that time.

Apart from the likely wanderings of the escaped English convict, William Buckley, who lived among the Wautharong people around the Bellarine Peninsula for 32 years after escaping into the bush in 1803, there was little European contact with the area until the arrival of the pioneer settler, John Batman, and his Port Phillip Association expedition in 1835. Batman established a base camp at Indented Head, and proceeded to survey the interior of the peninsula. Batman wrote glowing reports of the pasture and grazing potential of the Bellarine Hills (which he named "Wedge's Range"), with a view of attracting interest in establishing sheep runs in the Port Phillip area. Further exploration was carried out by John Helder Wedge later in 1835, with Batman's encouragement, and Wedge is believed to have again passed through the vicinity of Portarlington. He was also much impressed by the countryside, which he named "Ballarine", but discovering the scarcity of fresh water, he directed his attentions elsewhere. When the first organised group of settlers arrived from Van Diemen's Land (Tasmania) aboard the Enterprize in August 1835, they sought out the well-watered northern reaches of Port Phillip, around the Yarra River. Wedge and the Batman party quickly abandoned Bellarine and Indented Head and followed them there.

=== Settlement ===
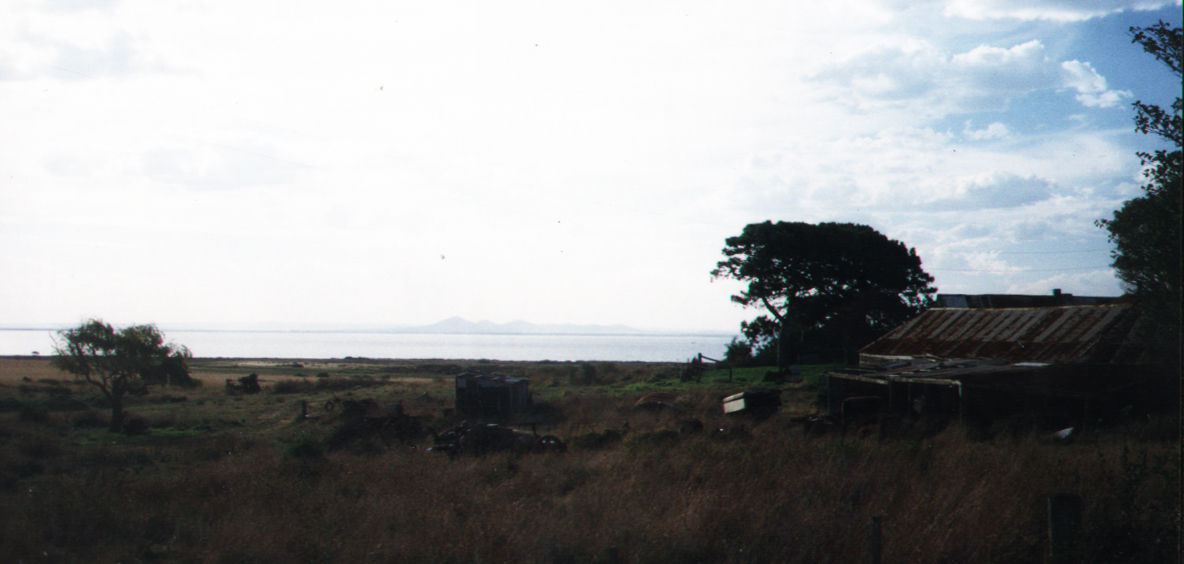
View to the You Yangs from Lincoln's Farm, near Point Richards.

When the holdings of the Port Phillip Association were allocated, the Bellarine Peninsula was allotted to the member, John Sinclair, who was the Superintendent of the Engineers' Depot in Launceston. Sinclair was injured in February 1837, when he came to Port Phillip and attempted to visit his property. His two companions, Joseph Gellibrand and George Hesse, who continued the journey without him, disappeared, and no trace of them was ever found. Sinclair was evacuated back to Melbourne from Point Henry and made no further effort to take up his allotted land, although he remained in the Port Phillip District. By 1839 the Port Phillip Association had been bought out by the Derwent Company, which sold a number of runs on the Bellarine Peninsula and Indented Head to squatters, before folding in 1842.

Among the earliest known settlers in the vicinity of Portarlington was the former Hobart butcher, Henry Baynton, who was recorded there in the 1840s. Baynton established a cattle shipping service between Portarlington and Van Diemen's Land. He is believed to have had a station named Westham, which may have occupied a site near the derelict homestead now known as Lincoln's Farm, overlooking Point Richards. Baynton also had interests at Cowie's Creek (now Corio), across the Bay. Baynton possibly sold out to John Brown, who is identified as the owner of a Point Richards station in 1847. Other squatters known to have had property around the Portarlington area in the 1840s include William Booth, James Conway Langdon, and William Harding. In 1848 new land regulations were introduced, and the squatters' runs were subdivided into smaller allotments over the following years. By the early 1850s the era of the squatters had passed on the Bellarine Peninsula.

=== Growth of the early township ===
The Old Mill at Portarlington.

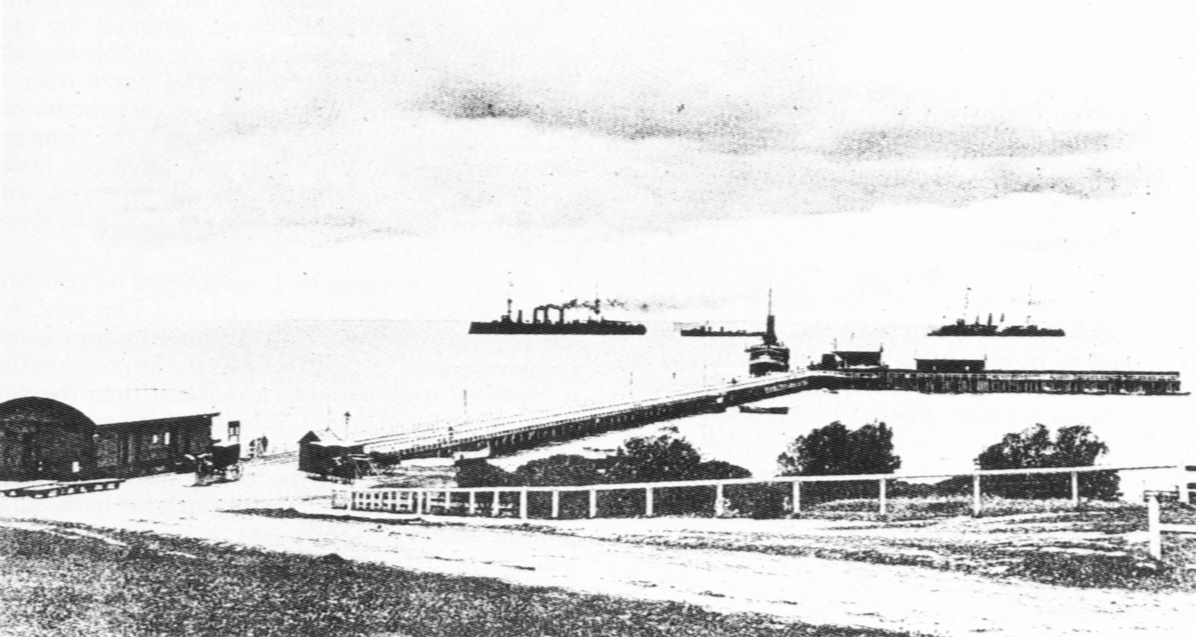
Steamers at Portarlington Pier in 1911.

View of Portarlington beach and foreshore, with the Grand Hotel and Rotunda in the background.

The township of Portarlington was formally surveyed around 1850 and was at that time named Drayton. It was renamed Portarlington in 1851, reportedly in honour of the English peer, Sir Henry Bennet, 1st Earl of Arlington. However, it is also suggested, and seems more likely, that owing to the number of early Irish settlers in the area, the town was named after the town in Ireland of the same name (founded by Sir Henry Bennet in 1666). The newly surveyed township was neatly laid out, with broad streets, and planted with English elms and pines.

The first sale of town lots took place on 22 October 1851. It was described in the Geelong Advertiser newspaper as a "new township at Indented Head" and buyers were confident that it would quickly become "a place of importance". The first buyers were mainly speculators so, although the lots initially sold well, few purchasers developed their blocks and the town was slow to fill.

A steam-powered flour mill opened in 1857. After a competing mill in nearby Drysdale was destroyed by fire in 1861, Portarlington began to develop more rapidly. At that time, the Bellarine Peninsula was regarded as the granary of the Victorian colony. The mill owners built a private jetty, and began receiving grain shipments from Geelong and shipping out the flour and bran produced. A post office opened on 1 March 1863 (known as Port Arlington until about 1866, although that may have been in error).

By 1865, the population of Portarlington had passed 200, and the town boasted two hotels and a blacksmith's shop. The Wesleyan congregation, who were the most numerous, built the town's first church in 1866. Before that, they had conducted their services at the mill.

The Portarlington Pier was constructed in 1859, after a petition from local farmers demanding access to a public jetty, and it quickly became an important port of call for the network of steamers plying Port Phillip Bay, both for goods and passengers. The Petrel, the first vessel serving the direct run to Melbourne's Hobsons Bay, was reportedly doing a brisk trade by 1866, delivering hay, butter, eggs, cheese, potatoes, wheat, flour, geese, turkeys, poultry, bacon, pork, and pigs, and returning with supplies of tea, sugar, coffee, wine, beer, spirits, and other commercial items. The jetty was extended in 1870, allowing sufficient depth for shallow draft vessels to dock at any tide, and soon daily steamers from Melbourne were calling. The first to pick up passengers and cargo was the Despatch, in 1872. The direct run to Melbourne provided markets for large deliveries of potatoes and onions from around Portarlington, and lines of carts laden with produce were a common sight heading down to the port. At times up to eight or nine lighters would be loading at the jetty with cargo for Melbourne, as well as a steamer. The jetty was reconstructed in 1872, and storage sheds added. In 1871, there were 343 inhabitants of Portarlington.

Portarlington's picturesque setting and fine sandy beaches attracted visitors from Geelong and Melbourne, and the regular steamer service secured the town's progress as a popular seaside resort. A public bathing house existed from as early as 1868, and a replacement was built in 1877. Bathing on the open beaches was prohibited in early days "out of respect for public sentiment".

A brickworks was established in 1870, producing bricks, tiles and pipes from the high grade Portarlington clay, for local use, but it was soon exporting to Geelong and Melbourne. When the flour mill closed down in 1874, the brickworks moved into the building. It seems to have ceased production during the 1890s depression.

The first State School in Portarlington (No. 1251) opened in the Wesleyan Church building in 1873, with 73 pupils. Following a dispute with church authorities, it was soon relocated to the Temperance Hall (built in 1874). The permanent red-brick school building, located on the current site, was formally opened on 27 Apr 1882, as State School No. 2455. It featured a bell-tower, a central fireplace, and two large rain-water tanks. A free public library opened in the ante-room of the Temperance Hall in 1883. A well-furnished building, purpose built for the library, was opened a year later, and a Market Reserve was established near the jetty in 1877.

The Anglican Church was built in Portarlington in 1883, and a Presbyterian Sunday school was constructed in 1888. The Catholic Church was completed in 1895, although it is believed that a Catholic school had been running in the town since the 1860s, and Mass may have previously been celebrated in a rented hall.

Horse racing began at Portarlington in 1859 on a track near the mill, but didn't generate much interest until the 1880s, when a new track was established to the west of the town. The new track was fenced-off in 1881, despite opposition from local graziers, and the Portarlington Turf Club was established in 1883, with an annual meeting held on Easter Monday. The track was close to the beach, and was knee-deep in sand in places. It was regarded as the heaviest track in the country.

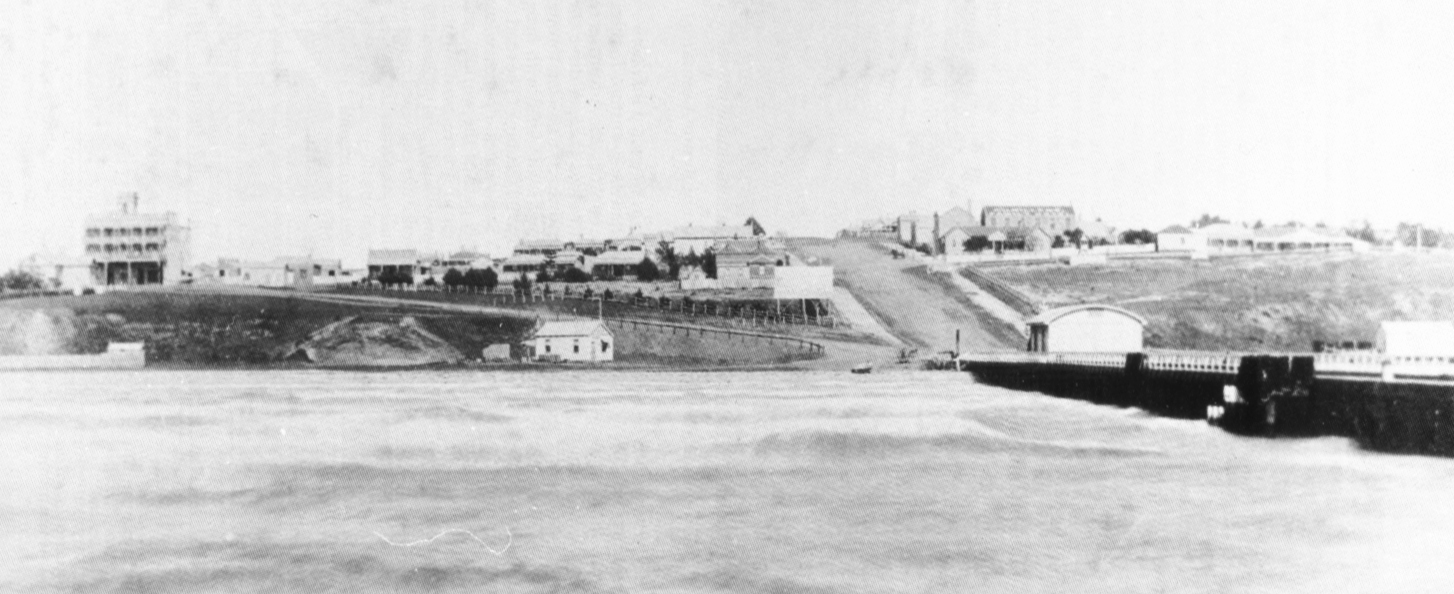
Panoramic view of Portarlington from the pier, circa 1900, showing Hotels and Market Reserve.

The Portarlington Cricket Club was established in 1872, although the game had been played in the town for many years before. An Australian Rules Football club appeared in 1874. Tennis courts were built in the old park in 1896.

A permanent police station opened in Portarlington in 1875, although a trooper had been stationed in the town since 1871. The new station had no lock-up, so any prisoners had to be taken to Drysdale.

In 1887, a corner of the Market Reserve was allocated as the site for the new brick post office. Portarlington had enjoyed a postal service since the 1860s, but public agitation for a more centrally located facility had increased throughout the 1880s. A telegraph service began in 1882. A bank branch was also operating in the town by the 1880s. In 1882, Portarlington was described as an exceptionally clean town, with a variety of stores and traders, and a daily coach service ran to Geelong, via Drysdale. Rail services were also accessible at Drysdale. Five fishermen were operating out of the town at that time.

=== Twentieth Century and Beyond ===
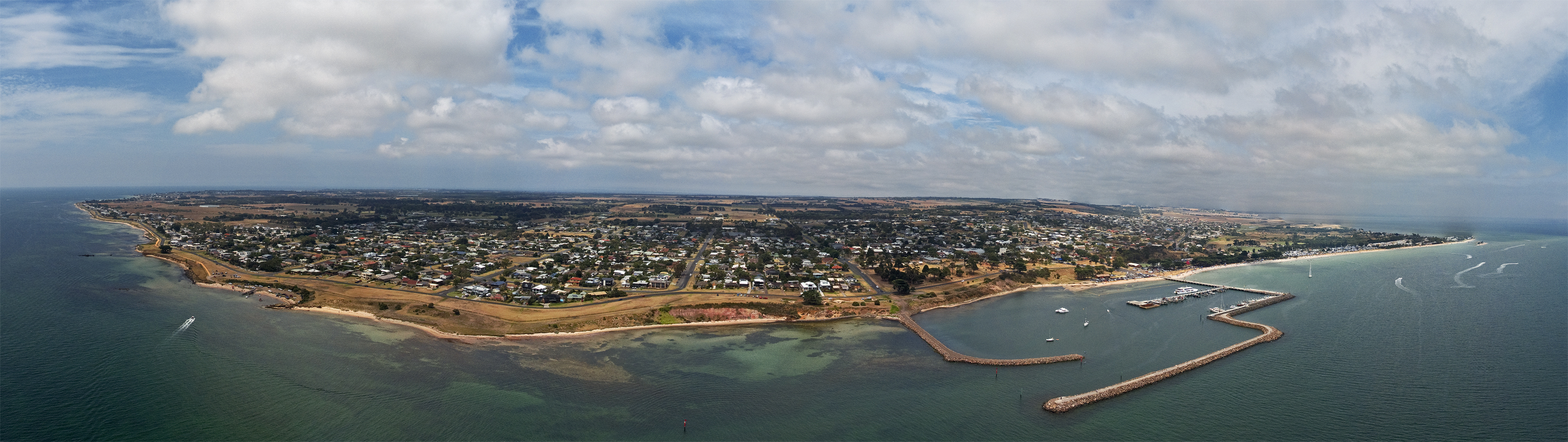
Portarlington from the air. Taken January 2018.

By the 1920s, the increasing usage of the automobile generated a new influx of holiday makers from Melbourne and regional Victoria. A number of camping grounds and caravan parks were established throughout the town, and in summer months the town's permanent residents were outnumbered many times over by holidaying families and tourists. Some families have been returning to Portarlington year after year, over multiple generations, some eventually buying holiday homes in the area, and they have become important contributors to the social and economic life of the town.

In more recent years the Seachange phenomenon has also made a notable impact on the town, with greater numbers of people buying property by the sea for lifestyle reasons or to enjoy their retirement. This has had a dramatic effect on property prices and has also led to calls for improvements in services and infrastructure in the area.

== Places of interest ==
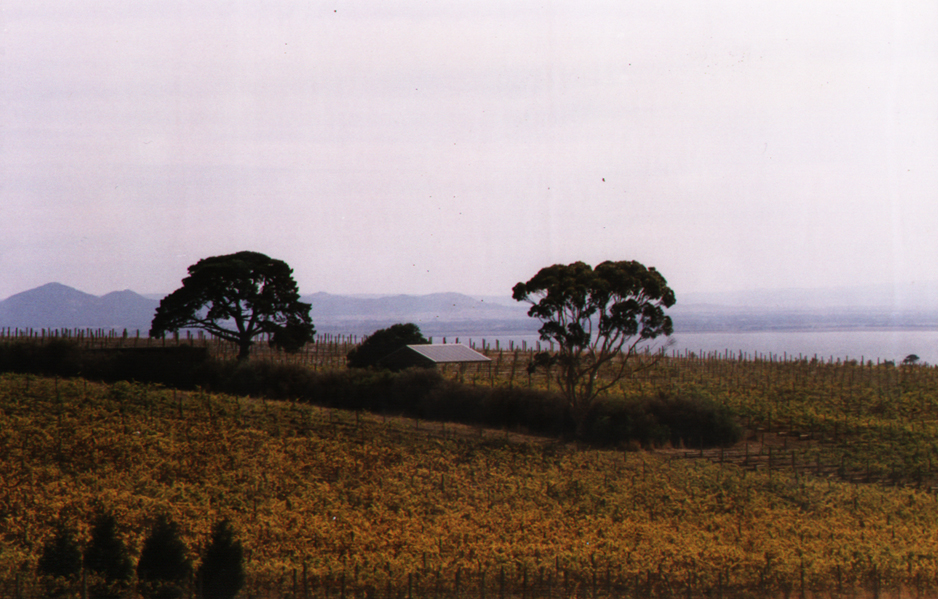
Vineyards in the Bellarine Hills.

- The Portarlington Mill is a heritage site that houses a museum. The site is listed on the Victorian Heritage Register.
- Claremont on the Bellarine. c1870. Known also as Laura Villa and Claremont House. One of the finest heritage homesteads in the seaside village of Portarlington, Victoria. It is a fine example of the uniquely Australian Victorian Rustic Gothic architectural design. Heritage Council Victoria and City of Greater Geelong Planning Scheme Heritage Overlay: HO: 1558
- Portarlington Pier: Centre of economic and recreational activity in Portarlington.
- Portarlington Rotunda: Distinctive landmark in the centre of town.
- The Grand Hotel, was built in 1888 and overlooks the Portarlington main street and harbour area. The hotel was renovated and re-opened in 2021
- Tall Sailing Ship top sail schooner Enterprize docks at the Portarlington Pier Christmas/New Year period, Mussel Festival January and Celtic Festival June.(On board Celtic music by Richard Armstrong)
- Bellarine Hills: Portarlington's natural skyline, offering spectacular Bay views, wineries, olive groves, etc.
- Mussel Farms: A significant economic activity in Portarlington.
- Point Richards Flora and Fauna Reserve: A local haven for wildlife and native vegetation around the wetlands on the western edge of the town.
- Portarlington Miniature Railway. . at Point Richards. Corner Boat Rd and Pt Richards Roads. This popular club runs train rides every Sunday throughout the year and also Wednesdays during school holidays. It has a kiosk where coffee and ice creams are available. New members are always welcome.

== Festivals and events ==
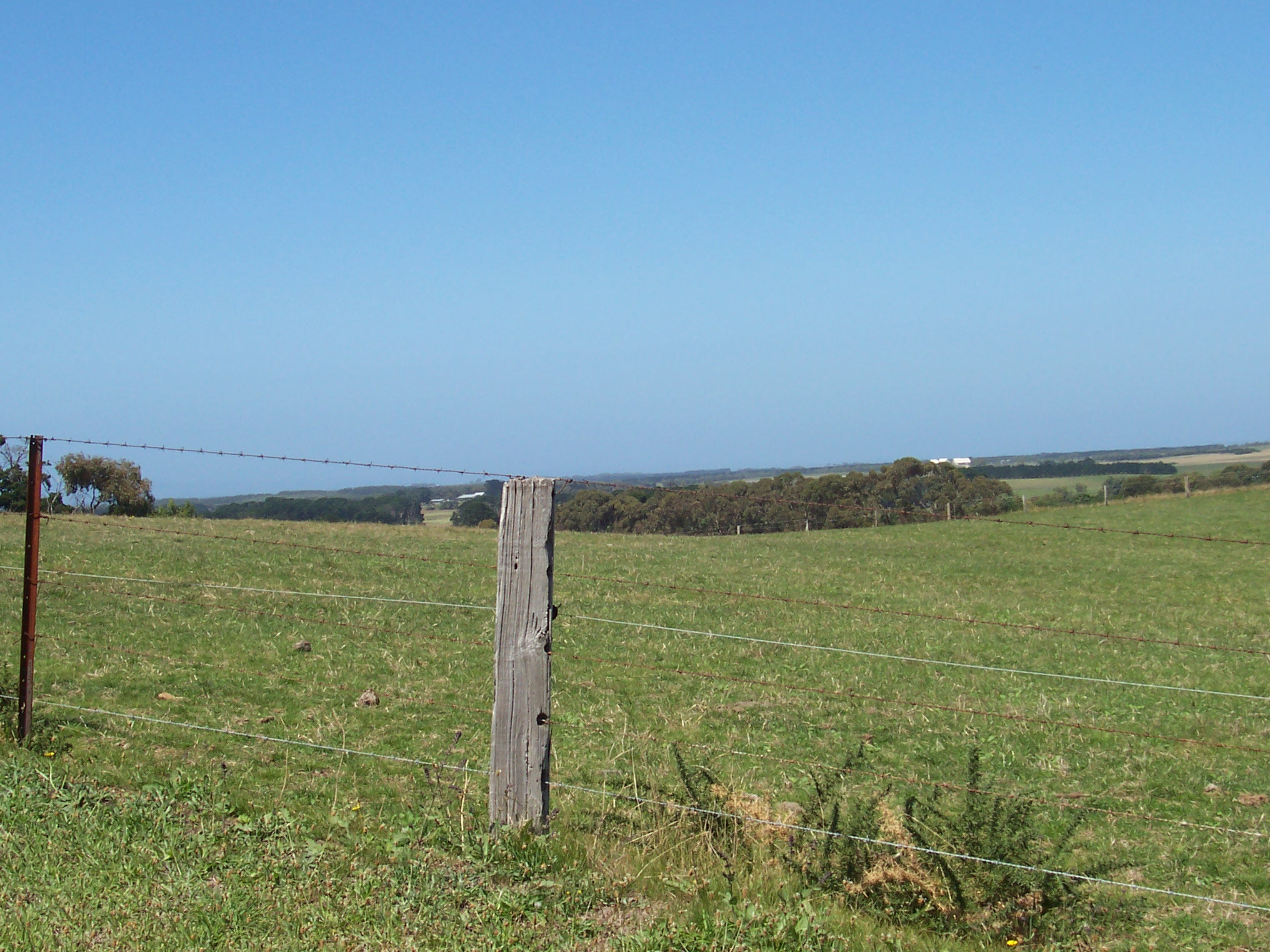
Scenery from around the town.

- Bay Cycling Classic: Portarlington hosts a full day of events in this world-class criterium series held at select locations around Port Phillip Bay in the New Year.
- Portarlington Mussel Festival: Food and festivities at Portarlington, the "Mussel Capital of Victoria", in mid January.
- Portarlington Triathlon: Described as one of the best courses in Australia. Victoria's oldest running triathlon event is held in late summer.
- Bellarine Agricultural Show: Variety of displays and activities held annually in March on the Portarlington Reserve.
- National Celtic Festival: Major festival of Celtic folk music, dancing, and cultural activities held all around Portarlington over the King´s Birthday weekend in early June.
- Portarlington Market: Bustling market held around Parks Hall in Portarlington on the first Saturday in each month.
- Carnival: Carnival rides and amusements located on the Portarlington foreshore during the summer holiday season.

== Transport Connections ==
- Public bus services connect Portarlington to the nearby city of Geelong and other towns on the Bellarine Peninsula.
- A regular fast ferry service operated by Port Phillip Ferries runs twice daily between the Portarlington Pier and Melbourne Docklands.
- Free shuttle buses run from the Portarlington Pier to many of the wineries and accommodation in the local area.

== Sport ==
Portarlington supports a range of sporting facilities and clubs, including:-

- Australian Rules Football - team competing in the Bellarine Football League.
- Cricket
- Tennis
- Netball
- Lawn Bowls - clubhouse and greens located on the Portarlington foreshore.
- Golf - played at the course of the Portarlington Golf Club located on Hood Road.
