= Bellarine, Victoria =

Bellarine
- Suburb
- Interactive map of Bellarine
- Coordinates: 38°07′56″S 144°37′11″E
- Country: Australia
- State: Victoria
- City: Geelong
- LGA: City of Greater Geelong

Government
  - State electorate: Bellarine
  - Federal division: Corangamite

Population
  - Total: 169 (2021 census)
- Postcode: 3221
Suburbs around Bellarine
Port Phillip	Port Phillip	Portarlington
Clifton Springs	Bellarine	Portarlington
Drysdale	Drysdale	Portarlington

Bellarine is a locality in the City of Greater Geelong, Victoria, Australia. At the 2021 census, Bellarine had a population of 169.

== History ==
The area was occupied by squatters from the late 1830s, and was initially known as East Bellarine to distinguish it from Drysdale, which was then known as Bellarine. A Free Presbyterian Church School opened in 1854, and was replaced by a new Presbyterian school in 1861. A Church of England (Anglican) school opened in 1855, closed in 1862 (though was used as a church for some years thereafter), and reopened in 1873. A mechanics' institute was established in 1858 and accumulated a library, though it was forced to share space with the Presbyterian school until its own building was erected in 1870.

East Bellarine Post Office opened on 1 June 1859, with the initial postmaster being C. H. Streeton, father of artist Arthur Streeton, and was renamed Bellarine on 16 January 1865. A Wesleyan Methodist Church was erected in 1865. The Farmers' Arms Hotel operated at the Avondale homestead around 1870, and a Cobb and Co. coach station was also located there. East Bellarine Cricket Club operated from 1871 to 1873, when it amalgamated with the Portarlington club to form the Bellarine Cricket Club. In 1873, Bellarine was reported to have a rural store, post office and blacksmith's shop. One church school was taken over by the Education Department in 1873 as Bellarine East State School No. 231, with the Church of England school taken over in 1874 as Bellarine State School No. 1415. A new Bellarine State School was built and opened in 1877, and Bellarine East State School closed in 1892. A Methodist Sunday School and Church Hall was built in 1894.

Bellarine Post Office closed on 27 April 1979, and Bellarine Primary School has also closed; its closure date is unknown, but the site has been subdivided and sold. The "Avondale" residence, which was the former "Farmers' Arms Hotel", survives, as does the former Wesleyan Methodist Church and the Methodist Sunday School and Church Hall (now the Uniting Church Hall).

== Spray Farm ==
Spray Farm, a historic rural property and one of the earliest farms on the Bellarine Peninsula, is located at Bellarine. It dates from 1851 and is listed on the Victorian Heritage Register and the Register of the National Estate. The property was bought in 1994 by the Browne family, owners of the adjacent Scotchman's Hill Vineyard, who renovated the property in 1998 and operated it as a function centre and concert venue. Among many concerts held there during this period, Spray Farm hosted the major Day on the Green music festival for nine years. The property was bought for A$7.5 million in 2010 by horsebreeder Rick Jamieson, and subsequently renovated and returned to being a private house. It was sold again in March 2014 to Australia and New Zealand Banking Group CEO Mike Smith for an undisclosed amount; the property had been advertised at A$12 million.

== Bellarine today ==
Bellarine remains largely rural. It contains several wineries, vineyards, stud farms and restaurants; the Terindah Estate, Scotchman's Hill, Bellarine Estate, and Jack Rabbit Vineyard (formerly Kilgour Estate) wineries are located there. Bellarine Peninsula Thoroughbred Agistment Park and Greenhills are two well-known horse-training and breeding parks in the area. The locality also contains the live music venue Harvester Moon.
