= Shire of Bannockburn =

Coordinates: 38°03′S 144°10′E

Shire of Bannockburn Victoria
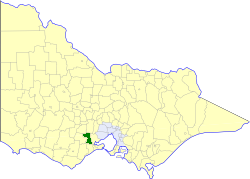
- Location in Victoria
- The Shire of Bannockburn as at its dissolution in 1994
- Population: 4,560 (1992)
  - Density: 6.493/km^{2} (16.817/sq mi)
- Established: 1862
- Area: 702.28 km^{2} (271.2 sq mi)
- Council seat: Bannockburn
- Region: Barwon South West
- County: Grant, Grenville
LGAs around Shire of Bannockburn:
Buninyong	Ballan	Ballan
Leigh	Shire of Bannockburn	Corio
Winchelsea	Barrabool	Geelong West

The Shire of Bannockburn was a local government area about 85 kilometres (53 mi) west-south-west of Melbourne, the state capital of Victoria, Australia. The shire covered an area of 702.28 square kilometres (271.2 sq mi), and existed from 1862 until 1994.

== History ==
Bannockburn was first incorporated as a road district on 31 October 1862, and became a shire on 30 June 1864. On 15 September 1915, it annexed the Shire of Meredith, which had been created on 30 June 1863, and became a shire on 28 April 1871. Parts of the shire's Steiglitz Riding were severed and annexed to the Shire of Corio's Lara Riding on 31 May 1916.

On 6 May 1994, the Shire of Bannockburn was abolished, and along with the Shires of Grenville and Leigh, and parts of the Shire of Buninyong, was merged into the newly created Golden Plains Shire.

== Wards ==
The Shire of Bannockburn was divided into four ridings, each of which elected three councillors:

- Bannockburn Riding
- Barwon Riding
- Meredith Riding
- Moorabool Riding

== Towns and localities ==
- Bamganie
- Bannockburn*
- Batesford
- Durdidwarrah
- Fyansford
- Gheringhap
- Inverleigh
- Lethbridge
- Maude
- Meredith
- Murgheboluc
- Russells Bridge
- Sheoaks
- Steiglitz
- Stonehaven
- Sutherlands Creek
- Woodburn Creek

* Council seat.

== Population ==
Year	Population
1954	2,126
1958	2,210*
1961	2,200
1966	2,211
1971	2,072
1976	2,365
1981	2,980
1986	3,484
1991	4,320

* Estimate in 1958 Victorian Year Book.
