= Shire of Barrabool =

Coordinates: 38°20′S 144°19′E

- Local government area
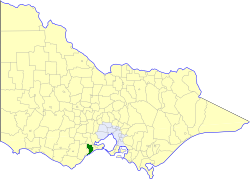
- Location in Victoria

- The extent of the Shire of Barrabool before the creation of the City of Greater Geelong in 1993
- Country: Australia
- State: Victoria
- Region: Barwon South West
- Established: 1853
- Council seat: Torquay

Area
  - Total: 575.18 km^{2} (222.08 sq mi)

Population
  - Total: 10,470 (1992)
  - Density: 18.203/km^{2} (47.146/sq mi)
- County: Grant
LGAs around Shire of Barrabool
Bannockburn	Bannockburn	Newtown
Winchelsea	Shire of Barrabool	South Barwon
Winchelsea	South Barwon	Bass Strait

The Shire of Barrabool was a local government area about 100 kilometres (62 mi) southwest of Melbourne, the state capital of Victoria, Australia. The shire covered an area of 575.18 square kilometres (222.1 sq mi), and existed from 1853 until 1994.

== History ==
Barrabool was incorporated as the second road district in the colony on 28 December 1853, and became a shire on 13 June 1865. On 31 May 1927, it annexed parts of the Shire of Winchelsea. Its shire offices were located on Grossmans Road, near the Surf Coast Highway in Torquay, although almost all of Torquay was within the City of South Barwon.

On 18 May 1993, parts of the shire were annexed to the newly created City of Greater Geelong, under then Premier Jeff Kennett. On 9 March 1994, the Shire of Barrabool was abolished, and along with the remainder of the City of South Barwon and parts of the Shire of Winchelsea, was merged into the newly created Surf Coast Shire.

== Wards ==
The Shire of Barrabool was divided into three ridings on 26 February 1958, each of which elected three councillors:

- Jan Juc Riding
- Coast Riding
- Moriac Riding

== Towns and localities ==
- Aireys Inlet
- Anglesea
- Barrabool
- Bellbrae
- Buckley
- Ceres
- Eastern View
- Fairhaven
- Freshwater Creek
- Gnarwarre
- Jan Juc
- Modewarre
- Moriac
- Mount Moriac
- Paraparap
- Torquay* (shared with the City of South Barwon)
- Wandana Heights
- Waurn Ponds

* Council seat.

== Population ==
Year	Population
1954	1,917
1958	2,740*
1961	2,344
1966	2,903
1971	3,471
1976	4,821
1981	5,723
1986	7,185
1991	9,904

* Estimate in 1958 Victorian Year Book.
