= County of Grant, Victoria =

Coordinates: 37°50′S 144°10′E

Grant
- Cadastral division
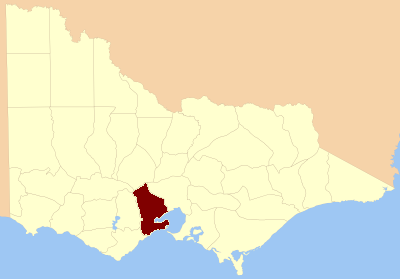
- Location in Victoria
- Country: Australia
- State: Victoria
- Established: 22 June 1853

Area
  - Total: 4,750 km^{2} (1,830 sq mi)
Lands administrative divisions around Grant
Ripon	Talbot	Bourke
Grenville	Grant	Bourke
Polwarth	Southern Ocean	Port Phillip

The County of Grant is one of the 37 counties of Victoria which are part of the cadastral divisions of Australia, used for land titles. It is located to the west of Melbourne, on the west side of Port Phillip, and includes Geelong. Ballarat is on its north-western edge. It is bounded in the west by the Yarrowee River, on the north by the Great Dividing Range and on the east by the Werribee River. The county was proclaimed in 1853.

The Darriwilian Age of the Ordovician Period of geological time is named for Darriwil parish in the county.

== Parishes ==
Parishes within the county:

- Anakie, Victoria
- Ballark, Victoria
- Ballarat, Victoria (also in the counties of Grant, Grenville, Ripon & Talbot)
- Balliang, Victoria
- Bamganie, Victoria
- Barrarbool, Victoria
- Bellarine, Victoria
- Beremboke, Victoria
- Borhoneyghurk, Victoria
- Bulban, Victoria
- Bungal, Victoria
- Bungaree, Victoria (also in the counties of Grenville & Talbot)
- Bungeeltap, Victoria
- Buninyong, Victoria
- Burtwarrah, Victoria
- Cargerie, Victoria
- Carrah, Victoria
- Carrung-e-murnong, Victoria
- Clarendon, Victoria
- Cocoroc, Victoria
- Conewarre, Victoria
- Coolebarghurk, Victoria
- Corio, Victoria
- Darriwil, Victoria
- Dean, Victoria (also in the county of Talbot)
- Duneed, Victoria
- Durdidwarrah, Victoria
- Gherang Gherang, Victoria
- Gherineghap, Victoria
- Gnarwarre, Victoria
- Gorong, Victoria
- Gorrockburkghap, Victoria
- Jan Juc, Victoria
- Kerrit Bareet, Victoria
- Korweinguboora, Victoria
- Lake Lake Wollard, Victoria
- Lal Lal, Victoria
- Lara, Victoria
- Mambourin, Victoria
- Meredith, Victoria
- Modewarre, Victoria
- Moolap, Victoria
- Mooradoranook, Victoria
- Moorarbool West, Victoria
- Moorpanyal, Victoria
- Moranghurk, Victoria
- Moreep, Victoria
- Mouyong, Victoria
- Murgheboluc, Victoria
- Murtcaim, Victoria
- Narmbool, Victoria
- Paraparap, Victoria
- Parwan, Victoria
- Paywit, Victoria
- Puebla, Victoria
- Tutegong, Victoria
- Wabdallah, Victoria
- Warrenheip, Victoria
- Werribee, Victoria
- Woornyalook, Victoria
- Wormbete, Victoria
- Wurdi-Youang, Victoria
- Yaloak, Victoria
- Yowang, Victoria
