= Barwon South West =

Barwon South West Region
- Region
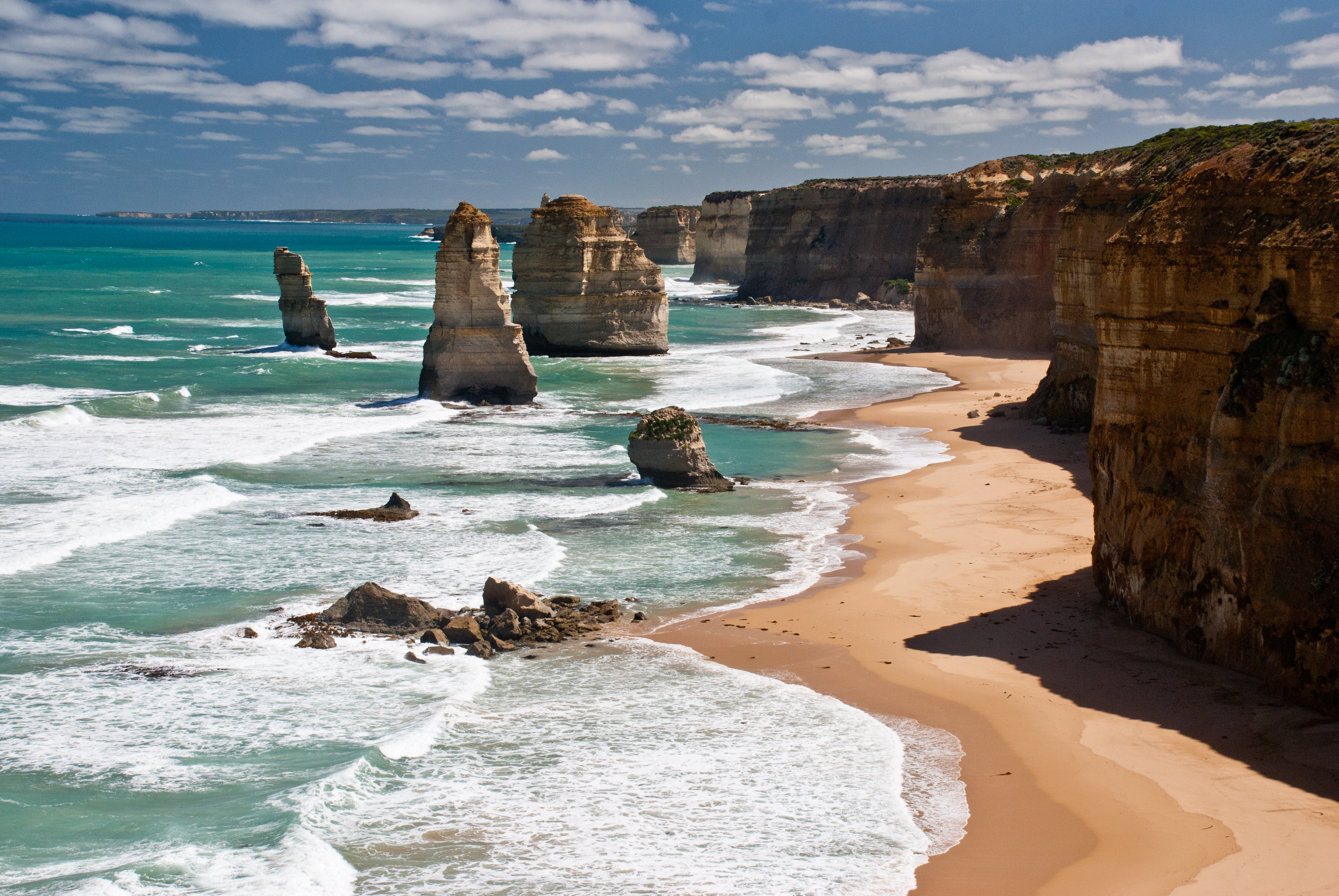
- The Twelve Apostles on the southwest boundary of the region.

- Coordinates: 38°23′S 142°29′E
- Country: Australia
- State: Victoria
- LGA: (by population); Greater Geelong; Warrnambool; Surf Coast; Colac Otway; Glenelg; Corangamite; Southern Grampians; Moyne; Queenscliffe

Government
  - State electorate: Bellarine; Geelong; Lara; Lowan; Polwarth; Ripon; South Barwon; South-West Coast
  - Federal division: Corangamite; Corio; Wannon

Area (Note: Area figure is the combined population of all LGAs in the region)
  - Total: 29,146 km^{2} (11,253 sq mi)

Population
  - Total: 360,384 (2011 census) (Note: Population figure is the combined population of all LGAs in the region)
  - Density: 12.36478/km^{2} (32.0246/sq mi)
- Website: Barwon South West Region
Regions around Barwon South West Region
Grampians	Grampians	Greater Melbourne
South Australia	Barwon South West Region	Port Phillip Bay
Southern Ocean	Bass Strait	Bass Strait

Aerial views of the Barwon South West region of Victoria, Australia.

The Barwon South West is an economic rural region located in the southwestern part of Victoria, Australia. The Barwon South West region stretches from the tip of the Queenscliff Heads to the border of South Australia. It is home to Victoria's largest provincial centre, Geelong and the major centres of Aireys Inlet, Apollo Bay, Camperdown, Colac, Hamilton, Lorne, Port Campbell, Port Fairy, Portland, Torquay and Warrnambool. It draws its name from the Barwon River and the geographic location of the region in the state of Victoria.

Comprising an area in excess of 40,000 square kilometres (15,000 sq mi) with approximately 360,000 residents as at the 2011 census, the Barwon South West region includes the Colac Otway, Corangamite, Glenelg, Greater Geelong, Moyne, Queenscliffe, Southern Grampians, Surf Coast and Warrnambool City local government areas and the Unincorporated area of Lady Julia Percy Island.

The Barwon South West region is located along the two major interstate transport corridors – the Princes Highway corridor and the Western Highway corridor. The region comprises two distinct and inter-connected sub-regions or districts: Greater Geelong and the Great South Coast. The region is bounded by Bass Strait and the Great Australian Bight in the south and southwest, the South Australian border in the west, the Grampians region in the north and the Greater Melbourne region in the east.

== Administration ==
=== Political representation ===
For the purposes of Australian federal elections for the House of Representatives, the Barwon South West region is contained within all or part of the electoral divisions of Corangamite, Corio, and Wannon.

For the purposes of Victorian elections for the Legislative Assembly, the Barwon South West region is contained within all or part of the electoral districts of Bellarine, Geelong, Lara, Lowan, Polwarth, Ripon, South Barwon, and South-West Coast.

==== Local government areas ====
The region contains nine local government areas and one unincorporated area of Victoria, which are:

Barwon South West region LGA populations
Local government area	Area		Population (2011 census)	Source(s)
Local government area	km^{2}	sq mi	Population (2011 census)	Source(s)
Shire of Colac Otway	3,433	1,325	20,345	
Shire of Corangamite	4,407	1,702	16,376	
Shire of Glenelg	6,212	2,398	19,575	
City of Greater Geelong	1,247	481	210,875	
Shire of Moyne	5,478	2,115	15,955	
Borough of Queenscliffe	36	14	3,000	
Shire of Southern Grampians	6,652	2,568	16,359	
Surf Coast Shire	1,560	600	25,870	
City of Warrnambool	121	47	32,029	
Totals	29,146	11,253	360,384	

=== Environmental protection ===
The Barwon South West region contains the Brisbane Ranges, Cobboboonee, Great Otway, Lower Glenelg and Port Campbell national parks.

== See also ==
- Geography of Victoria
- Regions of Victoria
