= Lake Connewarre State Wildlife Reserve =

Nature reserve in Victoria, Australia

Coordinates: 38°14′13″S 144°25′47″E

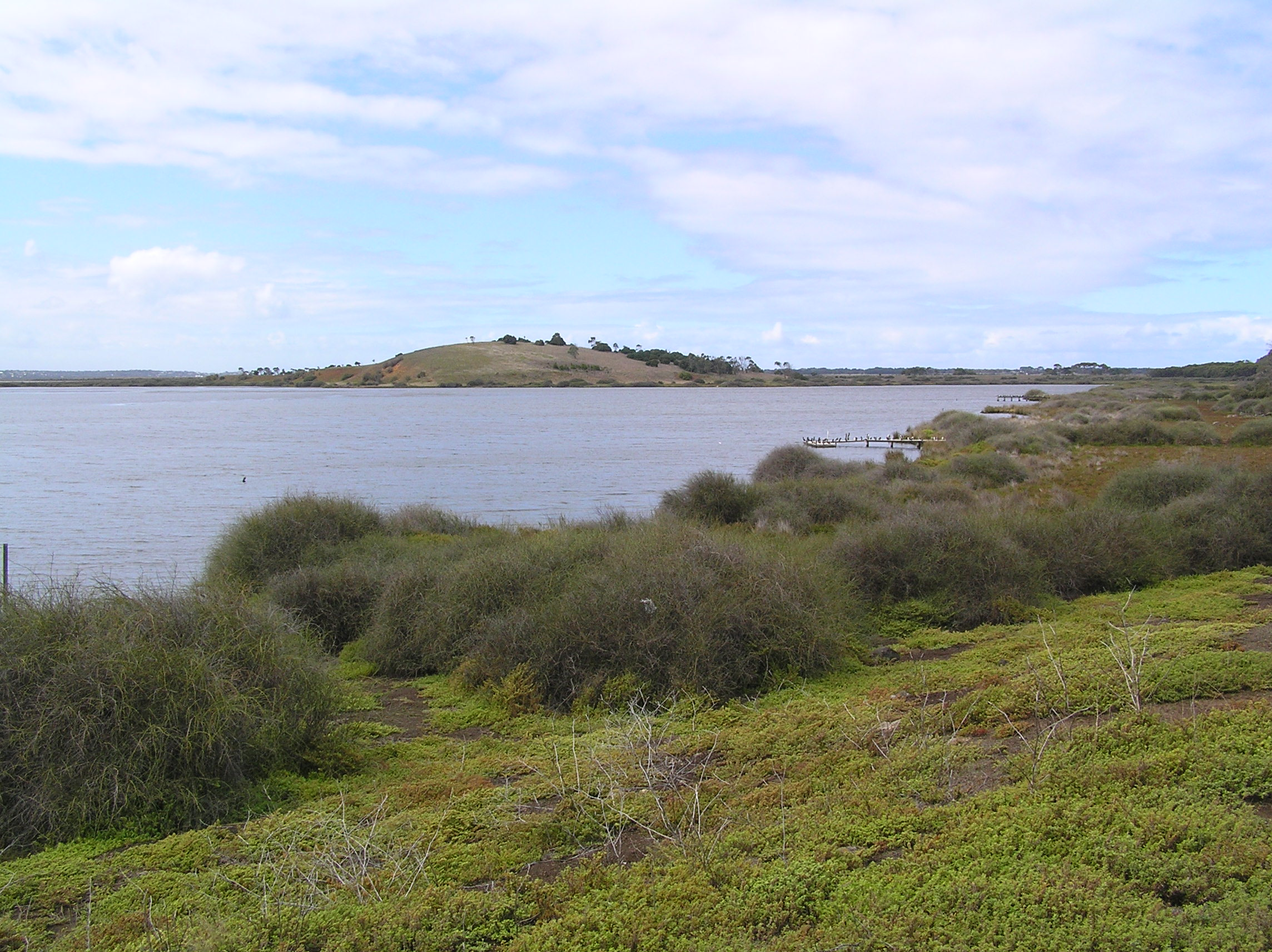
Lake Connewarre from Tait Point

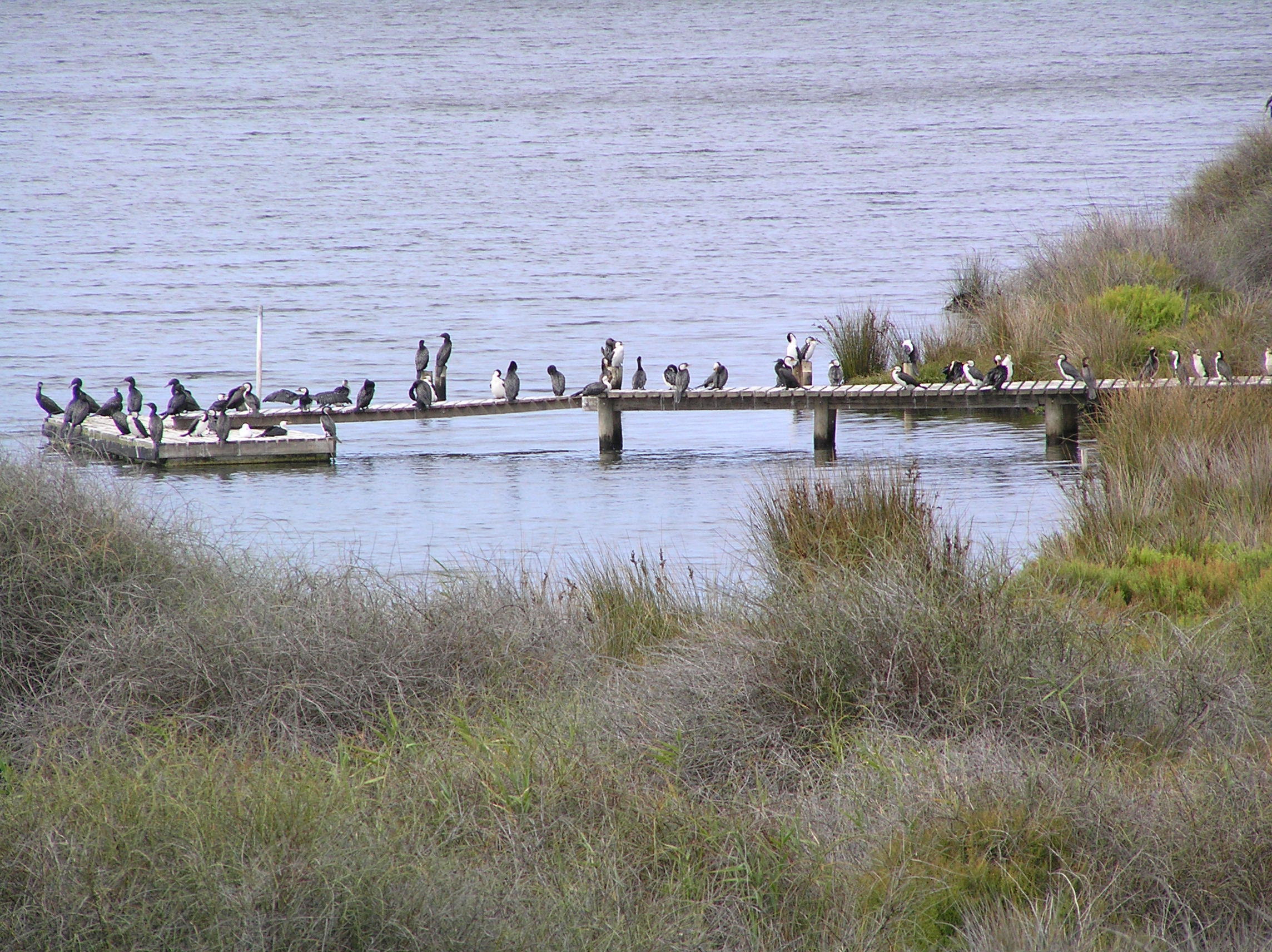
Cormorants roosting at Lake Connewarre

Lake Connewarre State Wildlife Reserve (LCSWR) is a 3411.1 ha Park in Victoria, Australia, that contains a diverse range of unique and significant ecosystems including a river, tidal delta, lakes, swamps, salt marshes and grasslands.

== Description ==
Lake Connewarre State Wildlife Reserve is situated on the lower reaches of the Barwon River on Victoria's Bellarine Peninsula, approximately 8 km south-east of Geelong and 65 km south-west of Melbourne. The Reserve holds the largest area of remnant vegetation on the Bellarine Peninsula and contains the most extensive example of Wilsonia herblands and Distichlis grasslands in Australia. As well as the saline and tidally affected Lake Connewarre itself, the reserve includes the adjacent freshwater Reedy Lake and the ephemeral Murtnaghurt Lagoon. Part of LCSWR is designated a State Game Reserve and is available for duck and quail hunting each year. Other recreational uses include fishing, windsurfing, canoeing and nature study.

Campbell Point protrudes into Lake Connewarre and contains the oldest dated Aboriginal archaeological remains on the Bellarine Peninsula. The deposits have been dated at between 3600 and 5200 years old and are considered significant for their demonstration of shellfish gathering which was uncommon on the central coast of Victoria.

== Environment ==
It is home to over 150 bird species. Several migratory species are listed the under international agreements Japan Australia Migratory Bird Agreement and the China Australia Migratory Bird Agreement. Twelve plant and animal species are listed as threatened under Victoria's Flora and Fauna Guarantee Act 1988 including the orange-bellied parrot. According to The Action Plan for Australian Birds by the Natural Heritage Trust, the orange-bellied parrot (Neophema chrysogaster) is critically endangered with approximately 180 mature birds remaining in the wild, and numbers continuing to decline. The reserve is part of the Bellarine Wetlands Important Bird Area, identified as such by BirdLife International because of its importance for orange-bellied parrots and for waterbirds.
