= List of shipwrecks in July 1883 =

The list of shipwrecks in July 1883 includes ships sunk, foundered, grounded, or otherwise lost during July 1883.

== 3 July ==
List of shipwrecks: 3 July 1883
Ship	State	Description
Daphne	United Kingdom	The steamship sank on being launched at Govan, Renfrewshire with the loss of 124 lives. She was raised, repaired, renamed, and entered service.

== 4 July ==
List of shipwrecks: 4 July 1883
Ship	State	Description
George Roper	United Kingdom	Four-masted barque, hit the reef off of Point Lonsdale, Australia while being tugged into port on her maiden voyage in a heavy fog. Subsequently salvaged before breaking up on 26 August. No loss of life.

== 6 July ==
List of shipwrecks: 6 July 1883
Ship	State	Description
Little Britain	United Kingdom	The tug was run into by the steamship Africa (United Kingdom) and sank in Regent's Canal.

== 7 July ==
List of shipwrecks: 7 July 1883
Ship	State	Description
John Tinnoth	United Kingdom	The Thames barge was severely damaged by fire at Wapping, Middlesex.

== 10 July ==
List of shipwrecks: 10 July 1883
Ship	State	Description
Kinghorn	United Kingdom	The steamship was damaged by fire at Leith, Lothian.

== 12 July ==
List of shipwrecks: 12 July 1883
Ship	State	Description
Erminia J.	Austria-Hungary	The full-rigged ship ran aground on the Fakeer Rocks, off the coast of Burma. She was refloated but was consequently beached.
Rowena	United Kingdom	The schooner sprang a leak and sank in the North Sea off the Newark Lightship ( Trinity House). Her crew were rescued by the fishing smack Caroline (United Kingdom). Rowena was on a voyage from Newcastle upon Tyne, Northumberland to Penzance, Cornwall.

== 13 July ==
List of shipwrecks: 13 July 1883
Ship	State	Description
USFC Fish Hawk	United States Fish Commission	The floating fish hatchery and fisheries science research vessel was blown ashore at Ocean Beach, Virginia, when she dragged her anchor during a storm. She was refloated on 18 July with assistance from the tugs Monroe ( United States Army), USS Pinta (United States Navy), and Snowdrop (United States), the revenue cutter USRC Ewing ( United States Revenue-Marine), and the lighthouse tender USLHT Holly ( United States Lighthouse Board).
West Gleam	United Kingdom	The brigantine collided with a floating object and sank in Carnarvon Bay. Her crew survived. She was on a voyage from Culdaff, County Donegal to Strood, Kent.
West Ridge	United Kingdom	The ship was sighted whilst on a voyage from Birkenhead, Cheshire to Bombay, India. No further trace, reported missing.

== 14 July ==
List of shipwrecks: 14 July 1883
Ship	State	Description
Inchclutha	United Kingdom	The steamship departed from Calcutta, India for Falmouth, Cornwall. No further trace, reported overdue.
Prospero Doge	Italy	The barque was abandoned in the South Atlantic. Her crew were rescued by the steamship Tartar (United Kingdom).

== 15 July ==
List of shipwrecks: 15 July 1883
Ship	State	Description
Isabella	United Kingdom	The brig was wrecked on Basque Island, Nova Scotia, Canada. She was on a voyage from Liverpool, Lancashire to Charlottetown, Prince Edward Island, Canada.
Unnamed	Switzerland	The ship foundered in Lake Lugano with the loss of nine lives.

== 16 July ==
List of shipwrecks: 16 July 1883
Ship	State	Description
Shebeen	(Ottoman Empire) Egypt	The steamship ran aground at "Ras-el-Khartom" and was severely damaged.

== 17 July ==
List of shipwrecks: 17 July 1883
Ship	State	Description
Achille	Italy	The barque collided with the steamship Glenogle (United Kingdom) and foundered in the English Channel off Beachy Head, Sussex, United Kingdom with the loss of three of her crew. Survivors were rescued by Glenogle. Achille was on a voyage from Buenos Aires, Argentina to Antwerp, Belgium.
John Howland	United States	The whaler, a barque was stove in by ice and abandoned in the Chukchi Sea south of Point Hope, Department of Alaska. Her derelict wreck caught fire on 20 July and sank the next day.

== 18 July ==
List of shipwrecks: 18 July 1883
Ship	State	Description
Freeman Clarke	United States	The full-rigged ship caught fire and was abandoned off the mouth of the Kabeljaauw River, Cape Colony with the loss of two at least two of her crew. There were at least eleven survivors. She came ashore at Humandsdorp. Freeman Clarke was on a voyage from Calcutta, India to New York.
Louise	United Kingdom	The steamship was run into by the steamship Lord John Russell (United Kingdom) and sank in the River Thames at Plaistow, Middlesex.

== 19 July ==
List of shipwrecks: 19 July 1883
Ship	State	Description
Colonel Adams	India	The ship was destroyed by fire at Brooklyn, New York, United States.
Delay	India	The ship was destroyed by fire at Brooklyn.
Lawrence	India	The ship was destroyed by fire at Brooklyn.
Perseverance	India	The barque was destroyed by fire at Brooklyn.
Playmate	United Kingdom	The cutter yacht capsized and was severely damaged at Falmouth, Cornwall.
Skjold	Norway	The barque ran aground on the Leman and Owers Sandbank, in the North Sea. She was on a voyage from Stettin, Germany to Charlestown, Cornwall. She was refloated and put in to Dover, Kent, United Kingdom in a leaky condition.
St. Louis	France	The brig collided with the steamship Dago (United Kingdom) and was severely damaged. St. Louis was on a voyage from Rauma, Grand Duchy of Finland to Saint-Brieuc, Côtes-du-Nord. She put in to Rønne, Denmark.

== 20 July ==
List of shipwrecks: 20 July 1883
Ship	State	Description
Albion	United Kingdom	The smack sprang a leak and sank off the Copeland Islands, County Antrim. both crew were rescued by the tug Lord Elgin (United Kingdom).
Unnamed	Flag unknown	The ship was driven ashore at Tornby, Sweden in a capsized condition.

== 21 July ==
List of shipwrecks: 21 July 1883
Ship	State	Description
Marie Joseph	France	The ship foundered in the English Channel. Her crew were rescued by the schooner Pollux (Germany).

== 22 July ==
List of shipwrecks: 22 July 1883
Ship	State	Description
Arab	United Kingdom	The brigantine sprang a leak and sank in the Irish Sea 20 nautical miles (37 km) off the coast of County Louth. She was on a voyage from Maryport, Cumberland to Dublin.
City of Lima	United Kingdom	The barque was wrecked at Port Natal, Natal Colony. Her crew were rescued. She was on a voyage from Liverpool, Lancashire to Port Natal.
Marco Polo	Norway	The clipper ship was wrecked near Cavendish, Prince Edward Island, Canada.

== 23 July ==
List of shipwrecks: 23 July 1883
Ship	State	Description
Proteus	United States	Lady Franklin Bay Expedition: The steamship was crushed by ice and sank at the entrance to Smith Sound. Her crew survived.

== 24 July ==
List of shipwrecks: 24 July 1883
Ship	State	Description
Lina Campbell	United Kingdom	The barque was abandoned in the South Atlantic (34°30′S 27°00′E). Her crew were rescued by the steamship Tartar (United Kingdom).
Varna	Netherlands	Dijmphna Expedition: The steamship sank in the Arctic Sea.

== 25 July ==
List of shipwrecks: 25 July 1883
Ship	State	Description
Commodore	United Kingdom	The Mersey Flat was run into by the steamship Texas (United Kingdom) and sank at Liverpool, Lancashire.
Olga	United Kingdom	The cutter yacht was run into by the steam yacht Virginia (United Kingdom) and sank at Kingstown, County Dublin.

== 27 July ==
List of shipwrecks: 27 July 1883
Ship	State	Description
Breeze	United Kingdom	The steamship was driven ashore 1 nautical mile (1.9 km) south of Porto, Portugal. She was refloated but found to be severely leaky and ran aground at Cabodella. Again refloated, she ran aground at Porto.
Ceres	Norway	The brig sank on Smith's Knoll, in the North Sea off the north Norfolk coast. Eight people were rescued by the schooner Wega ( (Russian Empire) Grand Duchy of Finland). Ceres was on a voyage from Saint-Malo, Ille-et-Vilaine, France to Riga, Russia.

== 30 July ==
List of shipwrecks: 30 July 1883
Ship	State	Description
Marquis of Lorne	United Kingdom	The steamship struck a sunken object and was beached near Morthoe, Devon. She was on a voyage from Bideford, Devon to Bristol, Gloucestershire.
Peri	United Kingdom	The schooner sprang a leak and was beached at Yarmouth, Isle of Wight. She was on a voyage from Saint-Valery-sur-Somme, Somme, France to Runcorn, Cheshire.
Titus	Flag unknown	The steamship was driven ashore at Western Point. She was on a voyage from Newcastle, New South Wales to Melbourne, Victoria.

== Unknown date ==
List of shipwrecks: Unknown date in July 1883
Ship	State	Description
Arabella	United Kingdom	The barque collided with the steamship Golconda (United Kingdom and was severely damaged. Arabella was on a voyage from Tuticorin, India to the English Channel. She put in to Colombo, Ceylon.
Assyria	Canada	The barque was abandoned in the Atlantic Ocean. She was on a voyage from Brunswick, Georgia, United States to Queenstown, County Cork, United Kingdom. She was subsequently discovered by another vessel, which put a prize crew aboard.
Balmoral	United Kingdom	The steam trawler ran aground and was damaged north of Berwick upon Tweed, Northumberland. She was later refloated and taken in to Berwick upon Tweed.
Deutschland	Germany	The barque was driven ashore at Rockhampton, Queensland. She subsequently became a wreck.
Favorit	Norway	The schooner ran aground in the Middelgrunden. She was later refloated with assistance.
Jean Baptiste	France	The barque foundered at sea. Her crew were rescued. She was on a voyage from Saint-Tropez, Var to Antwerp, Belgium.
Joanne	Haiti	The ship ran aground on the Molasses Reef. She was on a voyage from Cap-Haïtien to Havre de Grâce, Seine-Inférieure, France. She was refloated and taken in to the Turks Islands in a severely leaky condition.
Kate	Canada	The brigantine was wrecked in the Turks Islands. Her crew were rescued. She was on a voyage from Cow Bay, Nova Scotia to Cuba.
Khedive	United Kingdom	The barque ran aground on the Haisborough Sands, in the North Sea off the coast of Norfolk. She was on a voyage from South Shields, County Durham to Buenos Aires, Argentina. She was refloated and was assisted in to Great Yarmouth, Norfolk.
Nettlesworth	United Kingdom	The steamship was driven ashore in the Magdalen Islands, Nova Scotia.
Recepta	Flag unknown	The steamship ran aground on the Robbenplatte, in the North Sea. She was later refloated and taken in to Hamburg, Germany.
Rona	United Kingdom	The barque foundered off Cape Recife, Cape Colony. Her crew were rescued. She was on a voyage from Tuticorin, India to Liverpool.
Susanna	United Kingdom	The derelict schooner was towed in to Lamlash, Isle of Arran in a capsized condition.
Umberto Galatola	Italy	The barque was abandoned in the Atlantic Ocean before 7 July. Her crew were rescued. She was on a voyage from Alicante, Spain to New York, United States.
Vandyck	Canada	The ship was driven ashore in the Fox River. She was on a voyage from Sydney, Nova Scotia to Quebec City.
Victor	United States	The ship was driven ashore in the Carimata Strait. She was on a voyage from Singapore, Straits Settlements to New York. She was refloated and put back to Singapore in a leaky condition.
West Ridge	United Kingdom	The barque foundered in the Indian Ocean with the loss of all 28 crew, probably due to an onboard explosion. She was on a voyage from Liverpool, Lancashire to Bombay, India.
Windermere	United Kingdom	The steamship ran aground in the Great Belt. She was on a voyage from an English port to Flensburg, Germany. She had been refloated by 19 July and had resumed her voyage.
