= Barwon Heads =

- Suburb
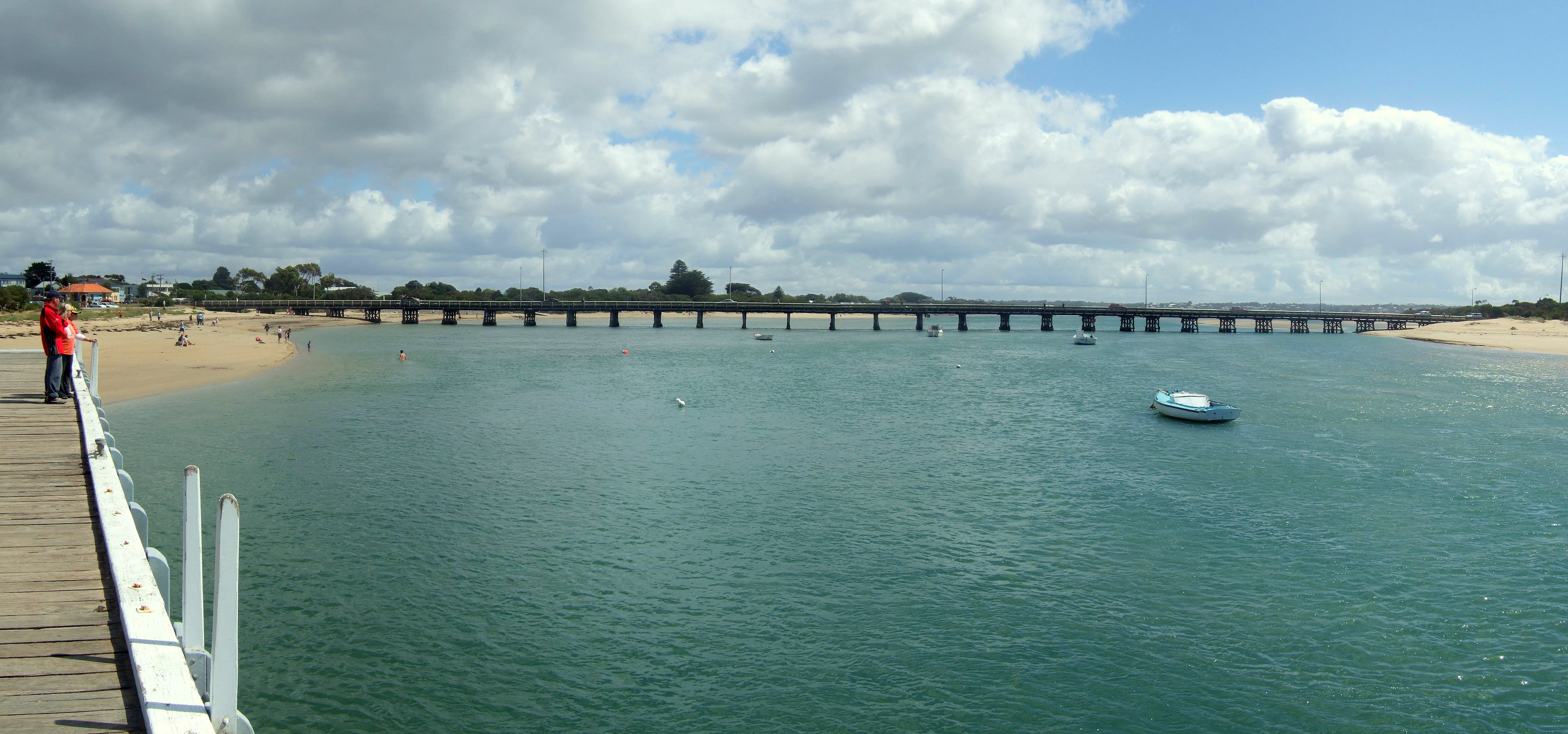
- The old Barwon Heads Bridge, 2007

- Interactive map of Barwon Heads
- Coordinates: 38°17′S 144°30′E
- Country: Australia
- State: Victoria
- City: Geelong
- LGA: City of Greater Geelong

Government
  - State electorate: Bellarine
  - Federal division: Corangamite

Population
  - Total: 4,353 (2021 census)
- Postcode: 3227
Suburbs around Barwon Heads
Connewarre	Wallington	Ocean Grove
Connewarre	Barwon Heads	Ocean Grove
Bass Strait	Bass Strait	Bass Strait

Barwon Heads (previously known as Point Flinders) is a town on the Bellarine Peninsula, near Geelong, Victoria, Australia. It is situated on the west bank of the mouth of the Barwon River below Lake Connewarre, and is bounded to the west by farmland, golf courses and the saline ephemeral wetland of Murtnaghurt Lagoon. At the 2021 census, Barwon Heads had a population of 4,353.

== History ==
Barwon Heads lies within the territory of the Waddawurrung Balug clan, of the Wathaurong people. Its traditional name is Koornoo. Barwon derives from the Wathaurong word Barrwang or Baarwon meaning magpie. The river and upstream lakes (Lake Connewarre and Reedy Lake) were frequented by Aboriginal hunters and fishermen, as well as the escaped convict, William Buckley, who lived with the Wathaurong for 32 years.

When European settlers first arrived in Port Phillip in June 1835, a camp was established at Indented Head. Port Phillip Association surveyor, John Helder Wedge, explored the Bellarine Peninsula, including the Barwon and its lakes, in August 1835.

It is unknown when colonists first took up land at Barwon Heads but, by the 1870s, a township was formed, with a post office opening in the area on 15 December 1889 (renamed Connewarre East in 1890 when a new Barwon Heads PO opened in the township).

Fishing was the mainstay of the town in its early years. In the 1920s and 1930s, the town became a popular holiday resort, and a number of the wealthier families of Melbourne and the Western District built houses here. The summer period still sees a large influx of holidaymakers to the town.

In 1959, the closing scenes of the film On the Beach, based on the novel of the same name by Nevil Shute, about the end of human life on Earth, were filmed in the town.

The Barwon Heads Golf Club clubhouse, dating from 1923 to 1924, located on Golf Links Road, is listed on the Victorian Heritage Register.

The former Barwon Heads Bridge was also listed on the Register, but it was demolished in 2009 after being declared irreparable. A new bridge was constructed, which used components and design elements of the original bridge. A separate footbridge was built parallel to it.

== Barwon Heads Bridge ==
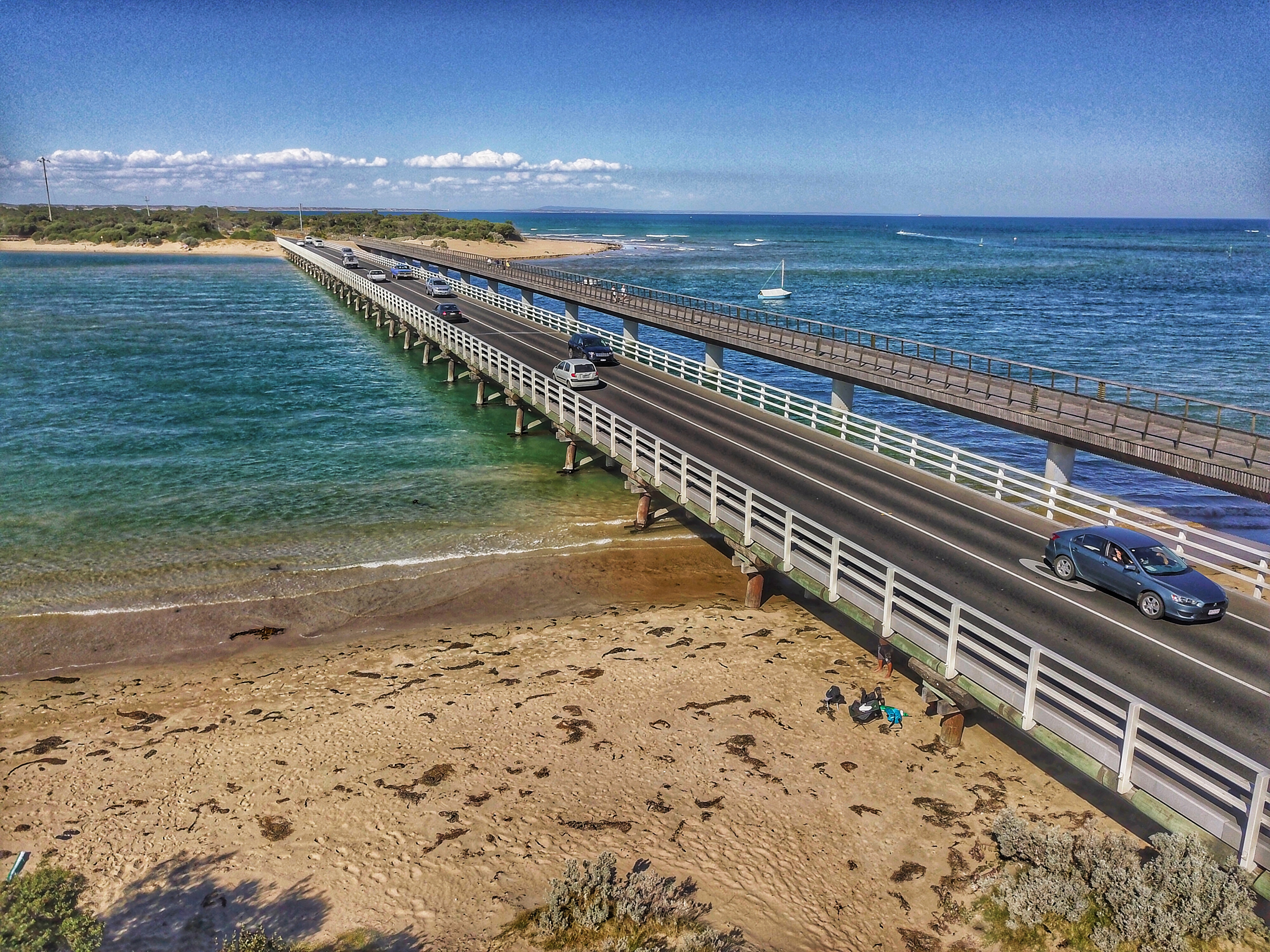
The Barwon river discharging into Bass Strait, showing the two bridges, 2018

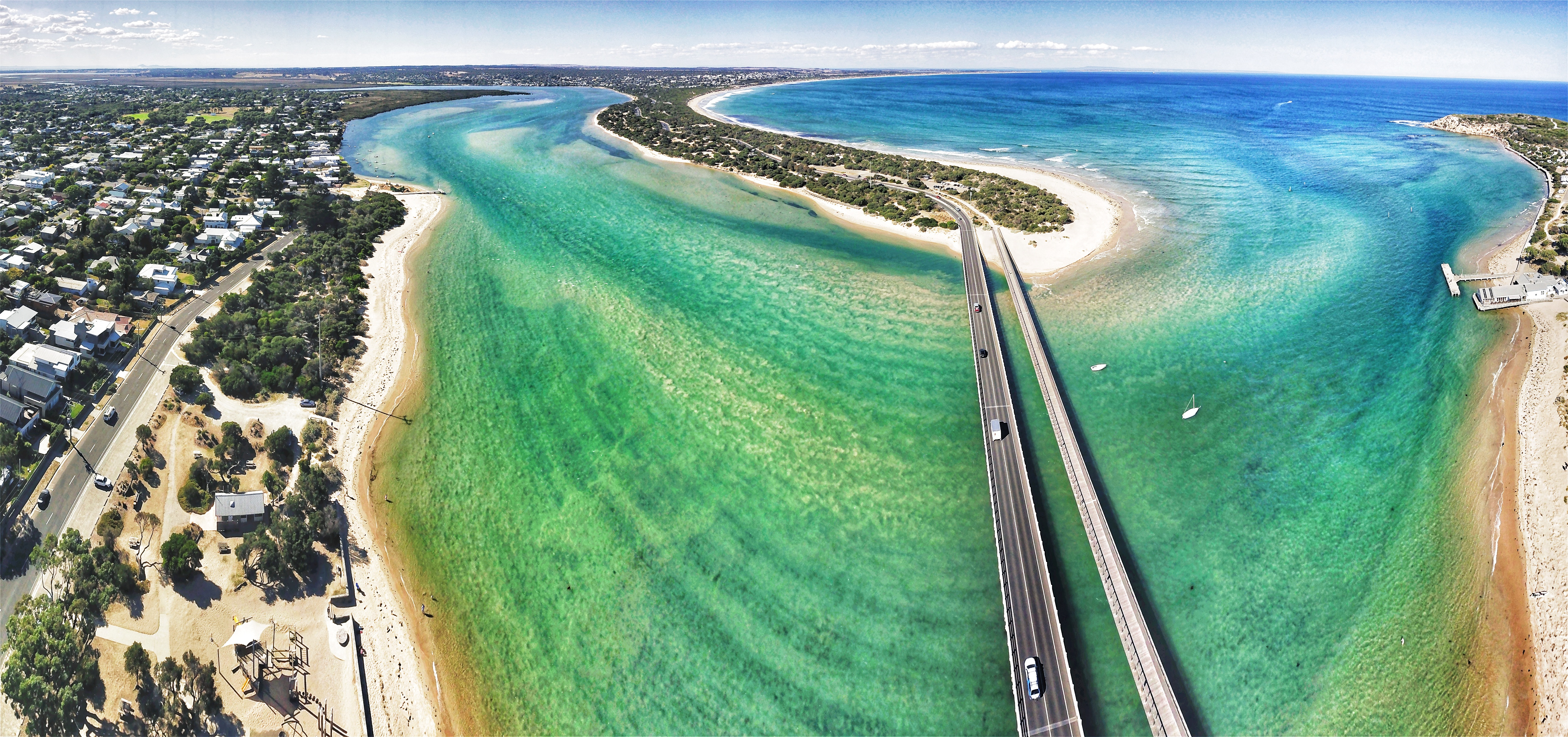
Aerial panorama of Barwon Heads Bridge, with road and pedestrian bridges, 2018

The original Barwon Heads Bridge, crossing the Barwon River between Barwon Heads and Ocean Grove, was opened in 1927. Prior to that, there had been a rowing boat service across the river. The closure of the bridge was a central element in the ABC television series SeaChange.

In July 2006, the Government of Victoria shelved plans to replace the heritage-listed bridge with a new one.

A proposal was put forward to align a new bridge with Geelong Road, permitting traffic to bypass the main shopping precinct and primary school, which would have required the demolition of three houses. An independent panel was appointed by the then Minister for Planning, Rob Hulls, to decide on a bridge location. Evidence was presented for and against the Geelong Road site and the existing site, with the conclusion that the Geelong Road alignment was unsuitable for environmental, social, economic reasons.

On 16 March 2007, it was announced that the current bridge would be improved and there were no plans to build a second bridge upstream. In 2010, a new Barwon Heads road bridge was constructed on the alignment of the existing one, making use of its components and design elements. A parallel pedestrian bridge was also built.

== SeaChange and tourism ==
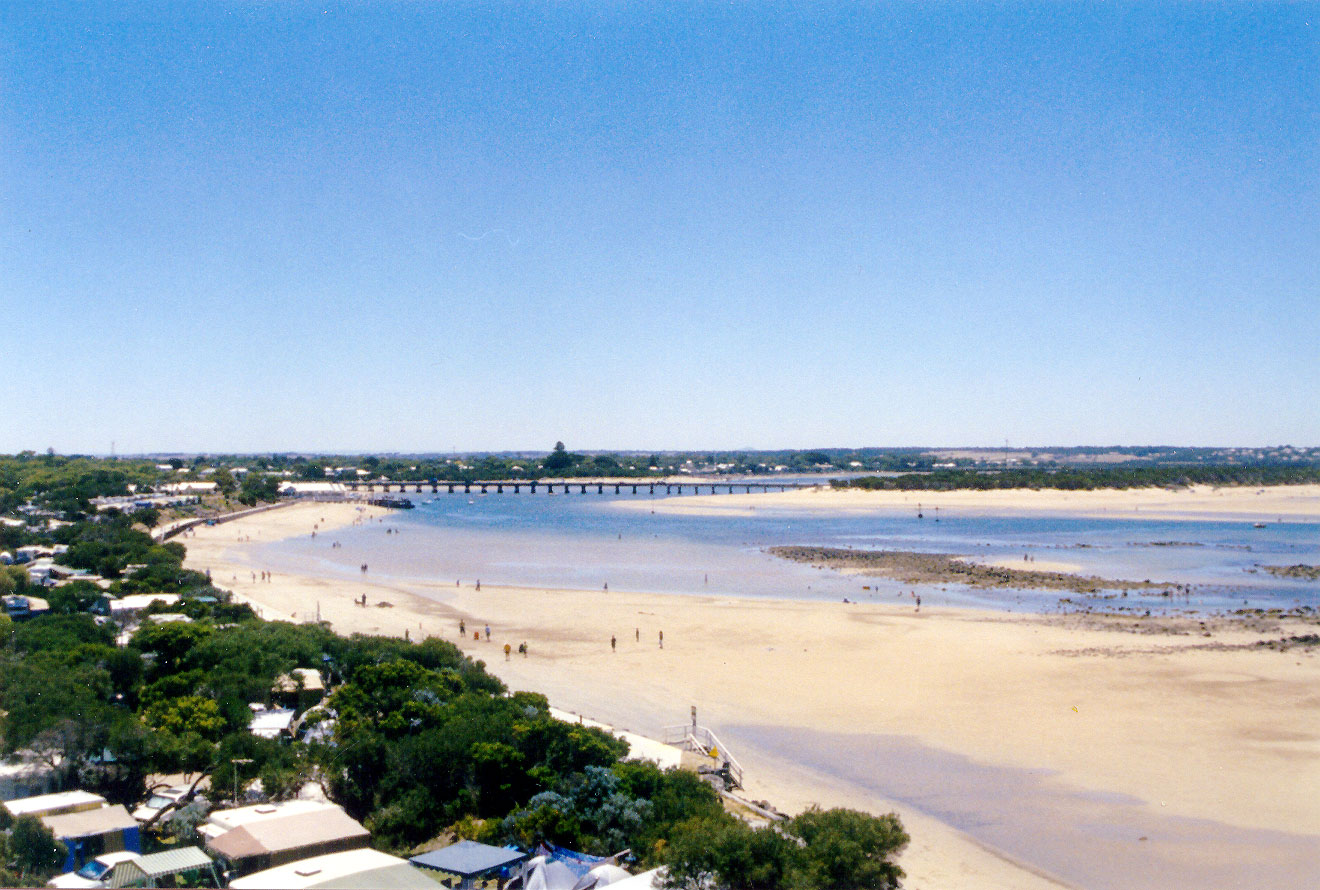
View of the town and the Barwon River estuary, as pictured from atop the southern head, 2006

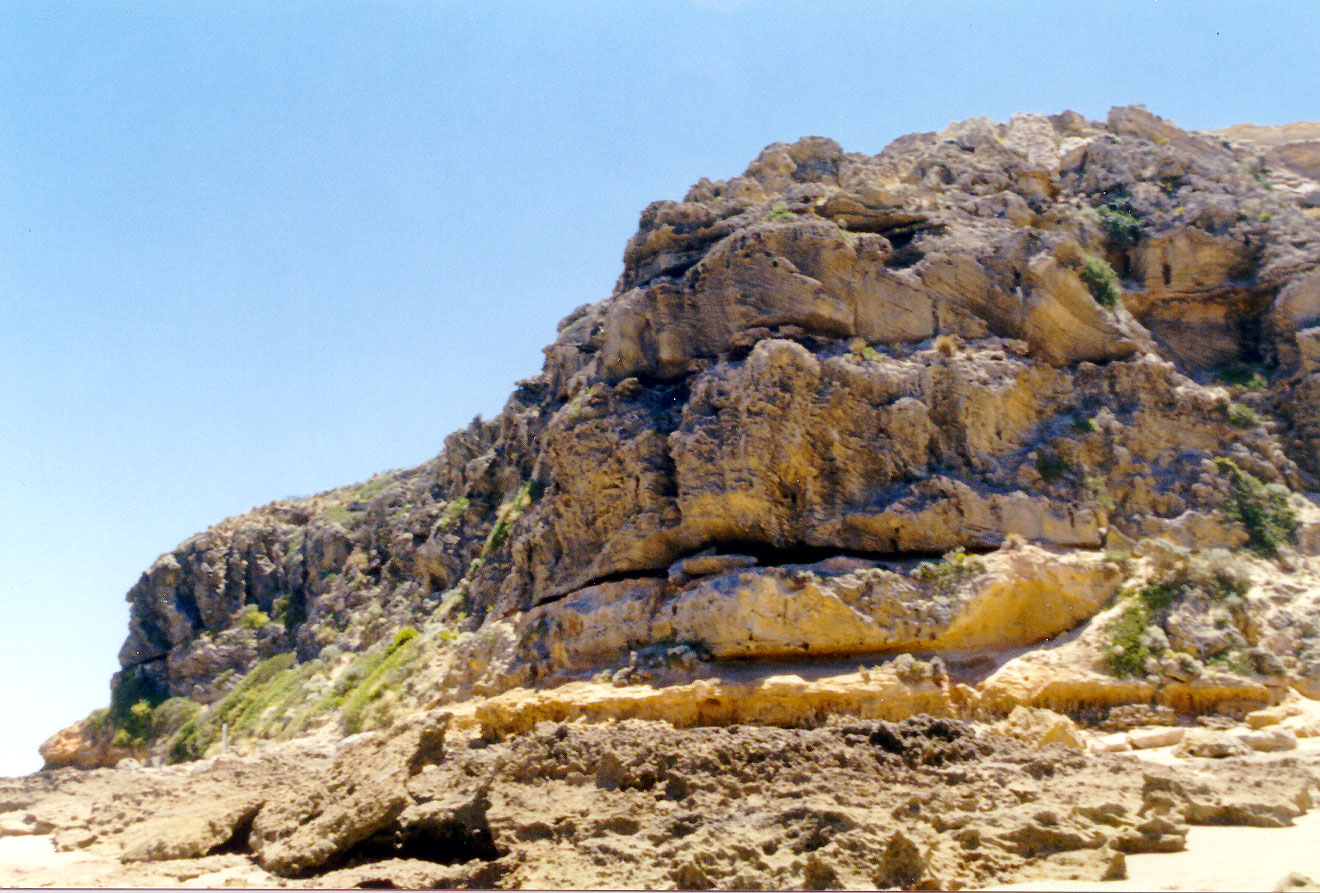
Face of the bluff on the southern head, 2006

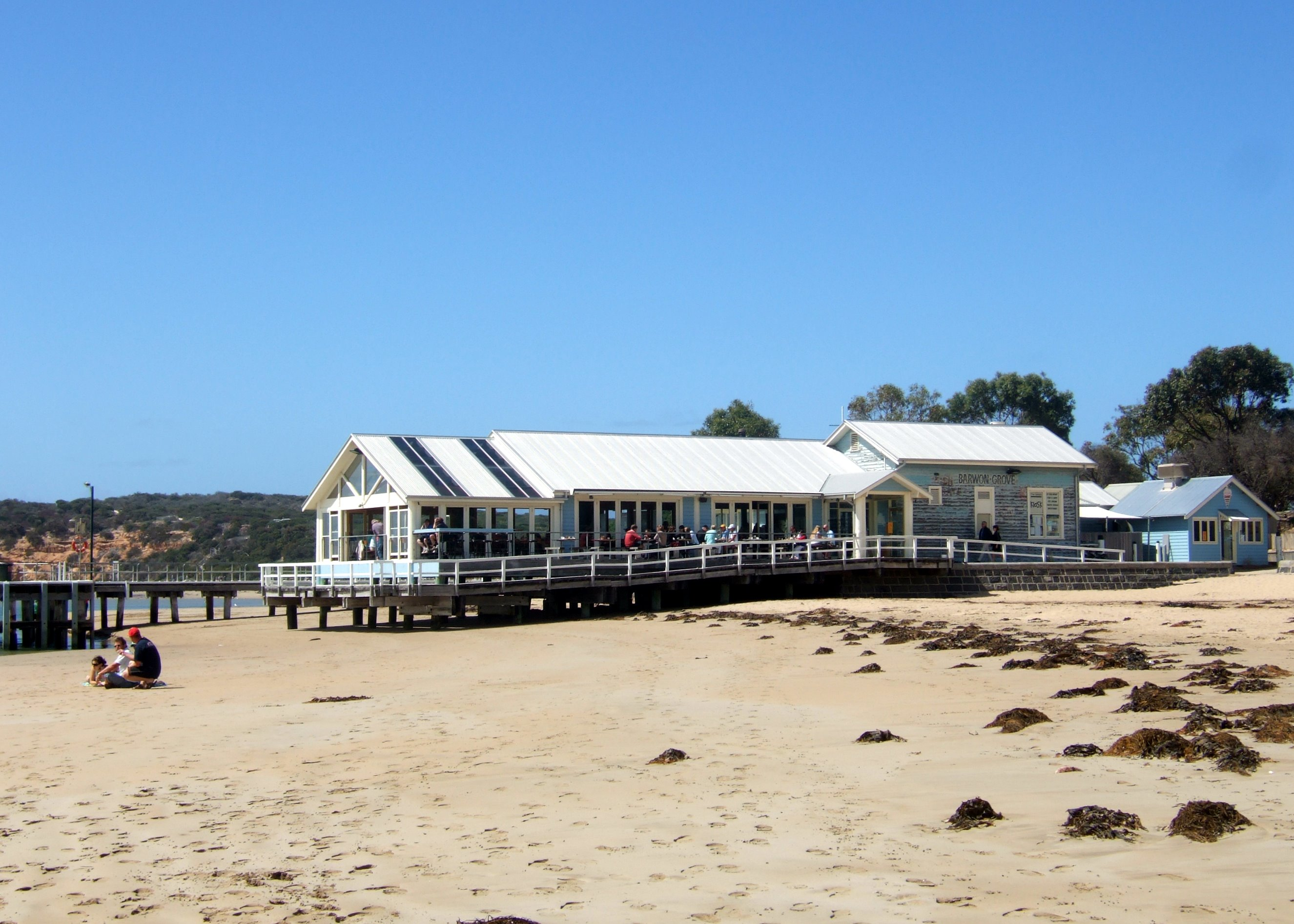
The blue weatherboard building served as Diver Dan's boatshed café in SeaChange, 2007

During the late 1990s, Barwon Heads was the primary location of filming for the popular Australian television series, SeaChange. In the past decade, Barwon Heads has become subject to what is colloquially known in some parts of Australia as the "seachange effect".

Since the SeaChange television series first aired in 1998 there has been a significant increase in tourism and real estate sales and development (both commercial and residential) in the area. This has resulted in a very substantial increase in property and land values, making the town an ideal location for property developers. Since then, the area has experienced a boom in tourist numbers during the summer months.

Nearby Thirteenth Beach is a popular surfing location, the beach is named for its proximity to the 13th hole of the golf course. The town was subject to flooding, including a flood that lasted some weeks in 1952, until the construction of levee banks in the 1950s.

The artist Jan Mitchell erected her first bollard sculptures in Barwon Heads. Visitors to the area will encounter the colourful soldier and parrot bollards, which designate a route for the local children from the primary school, through the streets to the bike path, park and playground. Mitchell went on to produce more than 100 bollards positioned along the Geelong Waterfront.

== Sport ==
The town has an Australian rules football team competing in the Bellarine Football League. It has made finals in a number of recent seasons, losing the grand final in an upset to Modewarre in 2018 but avenged that loss in 2019 winning its first premiership since 1993 by beating Torquay in the grand final.

Barwon Heads has a cricket club which won five premierships in eight seasons (2005/06, 2007/08, 2008/09, 2010/11 and 2013/14). They defeated Queenscliff in the A grade final on Sunday March 15, 2014 by 102 runs at Jan Juc. Barwon Heads was relegated to A2 Grade, but won their way back to A1 with a premiership and the next season, in 2023-24, won the A1 premiership, defeating Anglesea at Jan Juc. They are currently competing in the Bellarine Peninsula Cricket Association.

Barwon Heads also boasts a tennis, bowls, surf life saving, cycling, surfing, soccer and pony club. Golfers play at the Barwon Heads Golf Club on Golf Links Road, or at the course of the Thirteenth Beach Golf Links on Barwon Heads Road. Barwon Heads has great recreational fishing from its river to the heads, it caters for all types of anglers.

== Notable people ==
The footballer Jaxson Barham and the entertainer Barry Crocker were born in Barwon Heads.

Cadel Evans, the cyclist who won the 2011 Tour de France, owns a house in the area and is regularly seen training on local roads.
