= Marcus Hill =

Marcus Hill may refer to:

- Lord Marcus Hill, later known as Marcus Sandys, 3rd Baron Sandys (1798–1863), British politician
- Marcus Hill, Victoria, a bounded rural locality of the City of Greater Geelong, Victoria, Australia
- Marcus Hill, or Dyrus (born 1992), American professional gamer
