= Fred Kruger =

German photographer (1831–1888)

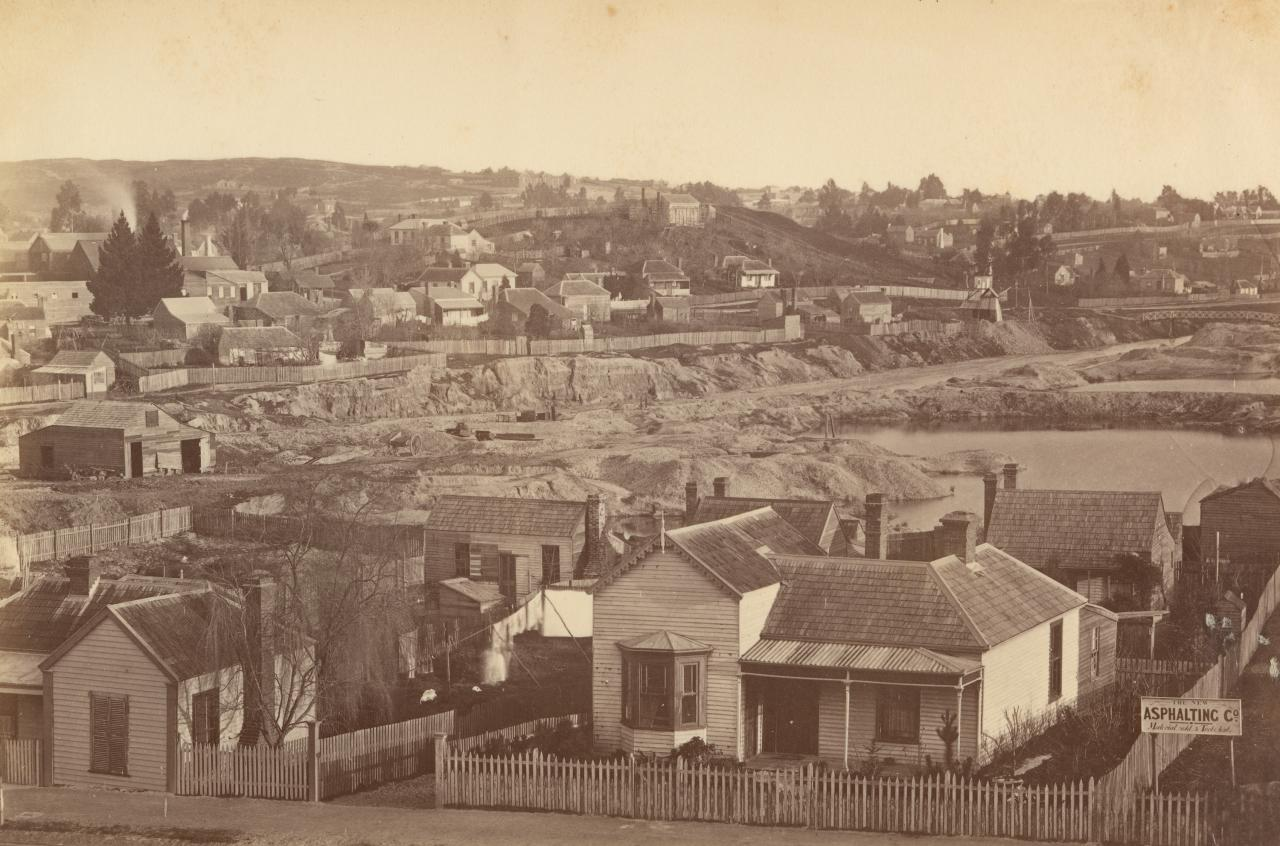
- View of Mount Pleasant, as seen from School of Mines, Ballarat by Fred Kruger (c. 1866)
- Born: Johan Friedrich Carl Kruger; 18 April 1831; Berlin, Germany
- Died: 15 February 1888 (aged 56)
- Known for: Photography

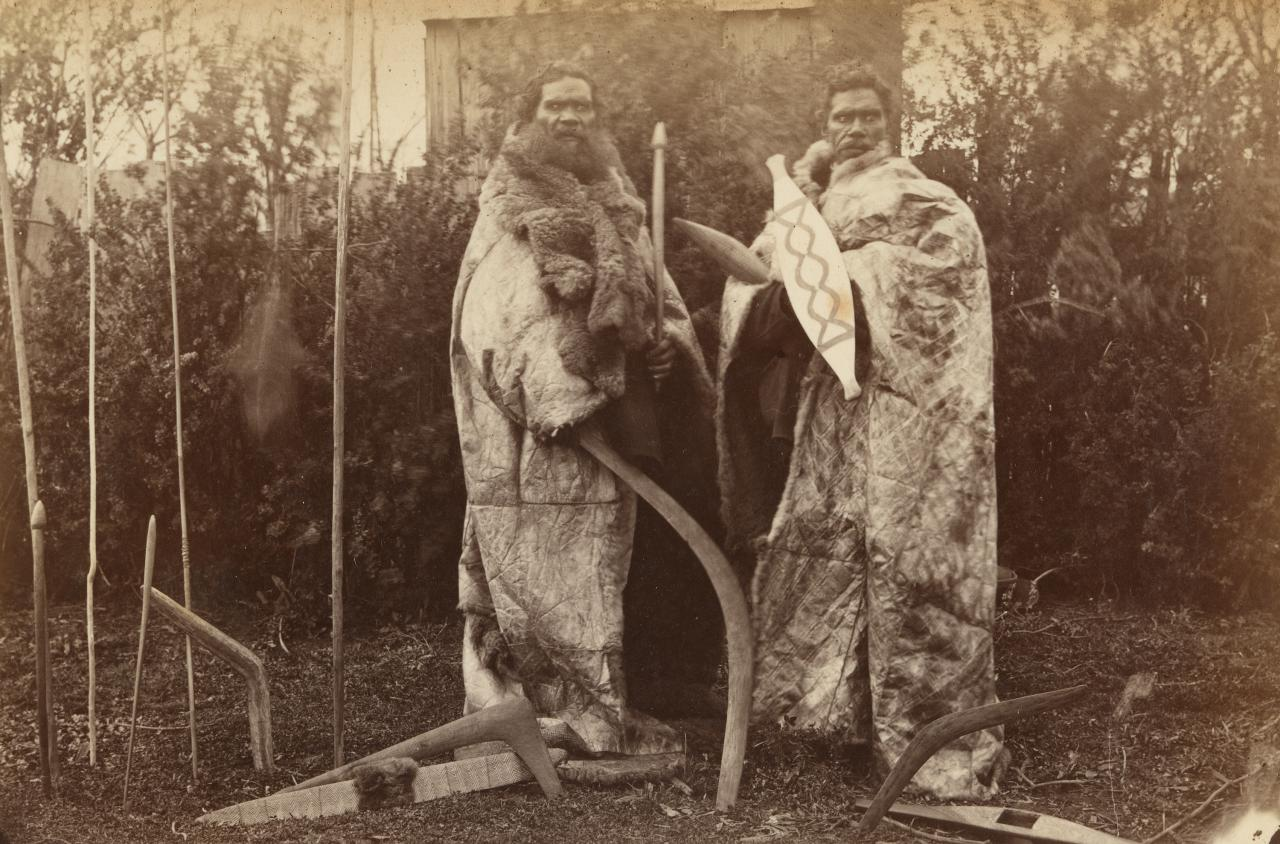
Victorian indigenous with war implements (c. 1883) by Fred Kruger

Fred Kruger (born Johan Friedrich Carl Kruger; 18 April 1831 – 15 February 1888) was a German-born photographer noted for his early photography of landscape and indigenous peoples in Victoria, Australia.

== Migration to Australia from Germany ==
Kruger was born of a working-class family on 18 April 1831, at 16 Steingassestrasse, Berlin, Germany, and was baptised Johān Friedrich Carl Krüger. He was an upholsterer and, in 1858, married Auguste Wilhelmine Elisabeth Bauman at Friedrichwerder Church in Berlin. It is thought that his wife and son migrated to Victoria, Australia on 23 April 1863, some time after his own arrival. He initially joined a partnership in a furniture business that his brother Bernard had established at Rutherglen in 1854. Kruger subsequently became the sole owner of the business, but then sold it before 1866, when he set up as cabinetmaker in Taradale.

== Photographic career ==
Also in 1866, Kruger first registered his photography business at 133 Cardigan Street, Carlton, Melbourne, before moving it in August 1867 to High Street, Prahran, Melbourne, continuing there until 1871, then relocating in Preston to High Street and again to Regent Street in that suburb.

During this period, Kruger was achieving international recognition for his landscape photography, including the award of medals from both the 1872 Vienna Exhibition and the 1876 Philadelphia Centennial Exhibition. He became the first photographer to take group photos of the first Aboriginal cricket team in 1866, which became one of his most recognised images, and was subsequently commissioned in 1877 by the Aboriginal Protection Board to create a collection of work including portraits of the Aboriginal residents of the Coranderrk reserve, an Aboriginal reserve run by the colonial government of Victoria, which was made public in 1883. Kruger won more awards; a gold medal for the best collection of landscape views and another, for the best panoramic view of Geelong, at the Geelong Industrial and Juvenile Exhibition in 1879.

In March 1879, Kruger was photographing groups of Geelong residents, ensuring each person could easily be identified in his detailed views, as he did when photographing the Corio Bay rowing crew in November 1879.

== Reception ==
Kruger's works are held in most national collections including the National Gallery of Australia, the National Library and in the National Gallery of Victoria where successive curators have provide commentary on his imagery. Jennie Boddington in 1980 observed Kruger's capture of significant detail in his scenes,

"Like Atget, [Kruger] shows the keen awareness of an observer who catches the seasons' flight and the daily plodding tread of history. He journeyed many miles with his equipment in the photographic cart...patiently collecting hundreds of images of immaculate and unpretentious veracity. We must look closely to get the full value of his sense of history: in small details in countless views, usually in the lower foreground, are the little figures he has assembled to tell us about those people and times and places, with a great deal of precious visual information."

while Dr Isobel Crombie, NGV Curator of Photography in 2012 concurred;

"Kruger's sweeping view shows his sophisticated understanding of how an image can be constructed to encourage viewing. He positions people strategically throughout the photograph and at a slight remove so that they are part of, rather than dominant figure in, an intricate visual imaging of the populated landscape. Kruger was also careful to articulate each element clearly, and this clarity greatly appealed to nineteenth-century tastes..."

== Geelong and later life ==
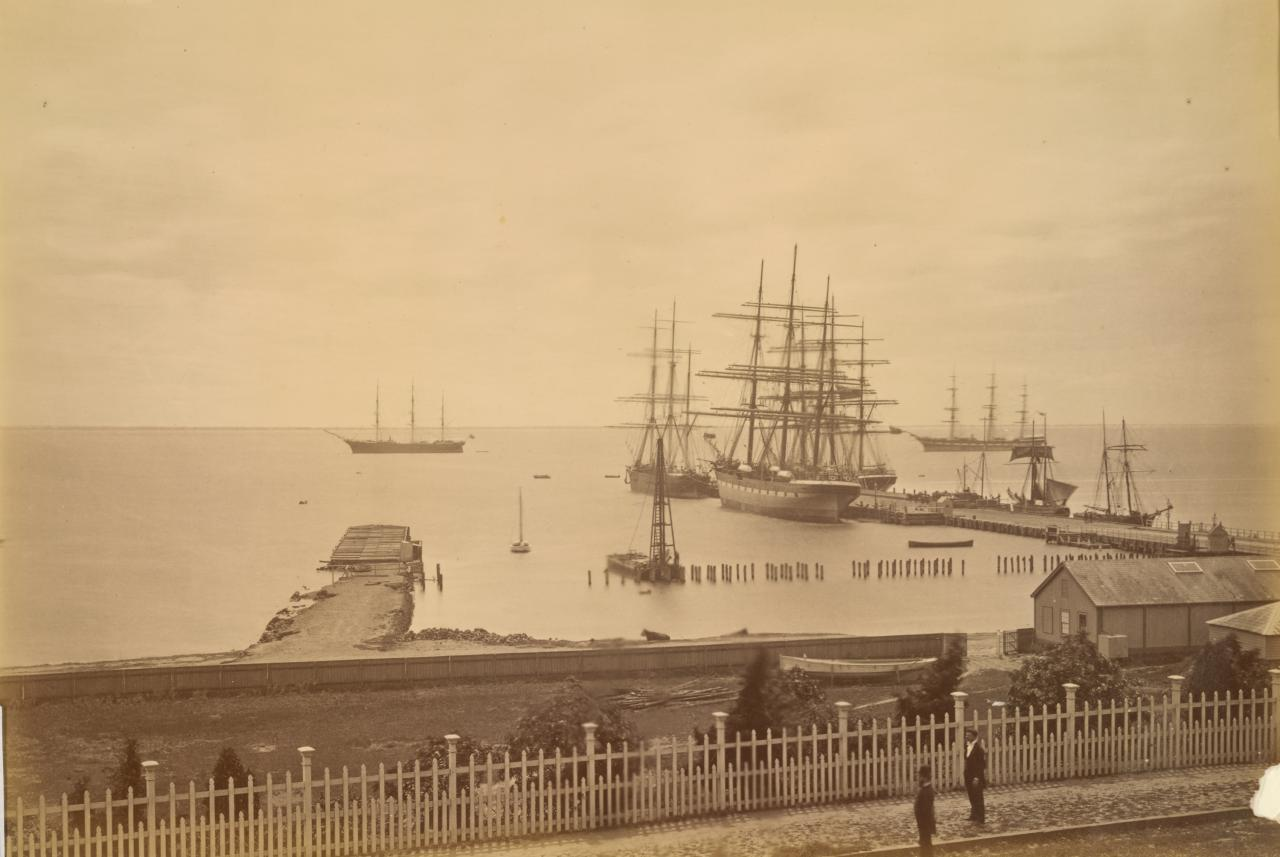
Yarra Street wharves, Geelong (c. 1878) by Fred Kruger

Kruger then settled in Geelong permanently, and his photography studio was registered on 29 December 1887 at Skene Street, in the Geelong suburb of Newtown. In 1880, he created a collection of twelve views of the streets and buildings of Geelong, which won him an award at the 1880 Melbourne International Exhibition. The government of Victoria engaged him to photograph the Yan Yean Waterworks for the Colonial and Indian Exhibition in London. Kruger gained commissions from house owners to photograph their homes, the most famous of which was from Lady Loch, the wife of the Governor.

Kruger made three visits to the Queenscliff region, in 1881, 1882 and 1885, capturing views to include the buildings of the settlement and its marine setting.

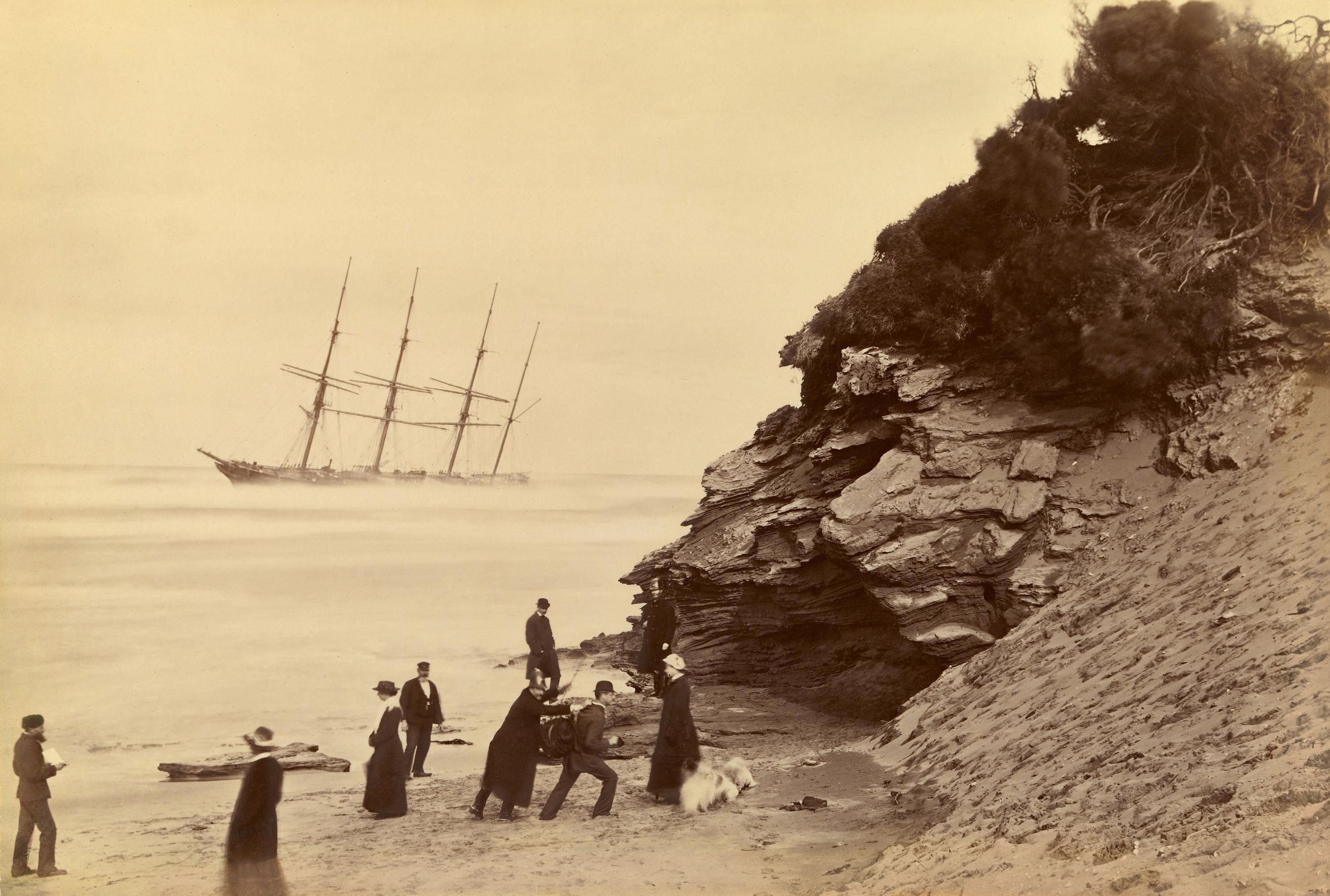
Wreck of the ship George Roper, Point Lonsdale (1883)

On 15 February 1888, Kruger died of peritonitis, in the Melbourne suburb of Surrey Hills. Large holdings of his work have been showcased at the National Gallery of Victoria.

== Projects and exhibitions ==
Kruger's work has been showcased all over the world. One of his most famous pieces of work was the very first group photo of the Aboriginal cricket team, named "Aboriginal Cricketers of Coranderrk", taken in 1866. He also took studio portraits of the three managers of the team.

Kruger concentrated on landscape photographs, a comprehensive exhibition of which, Fred Kruger: Intimate Landscapes, was held at the Ian Potter Centre: NGV Australia from 4 February to 8 July 2012, featuring over 100 prints of towns, buildings and streets familiar to present-day Victorians; the Esplanade at Queenscliff, Point Lonsdale and the You Yangs, amongst other locations around Victoria. Kruger's expansive but richly detailed views provide visual data on the social and political standards of Victoria in the mid to late 19th century. The collection of images displays how the Europeans changed the environment in imposing their culture while also preserving a sense of the natural picturesque.

== Awards ==
- 1872 Vienna exhibition in Austria: Gold Medal
- 1876 Philadelphia Centennial exhibition, Gold Medal
- 1879 Geelong Industrial and Juvenile exhibition
- 1880 Geelong Industrial and Juvenile exhibition
- 1880 Melbourne International exhibition
- 1886 Colonial and Indian exhibition
