= Ocean Grove, Victoria =

Ocean Grove
- Town
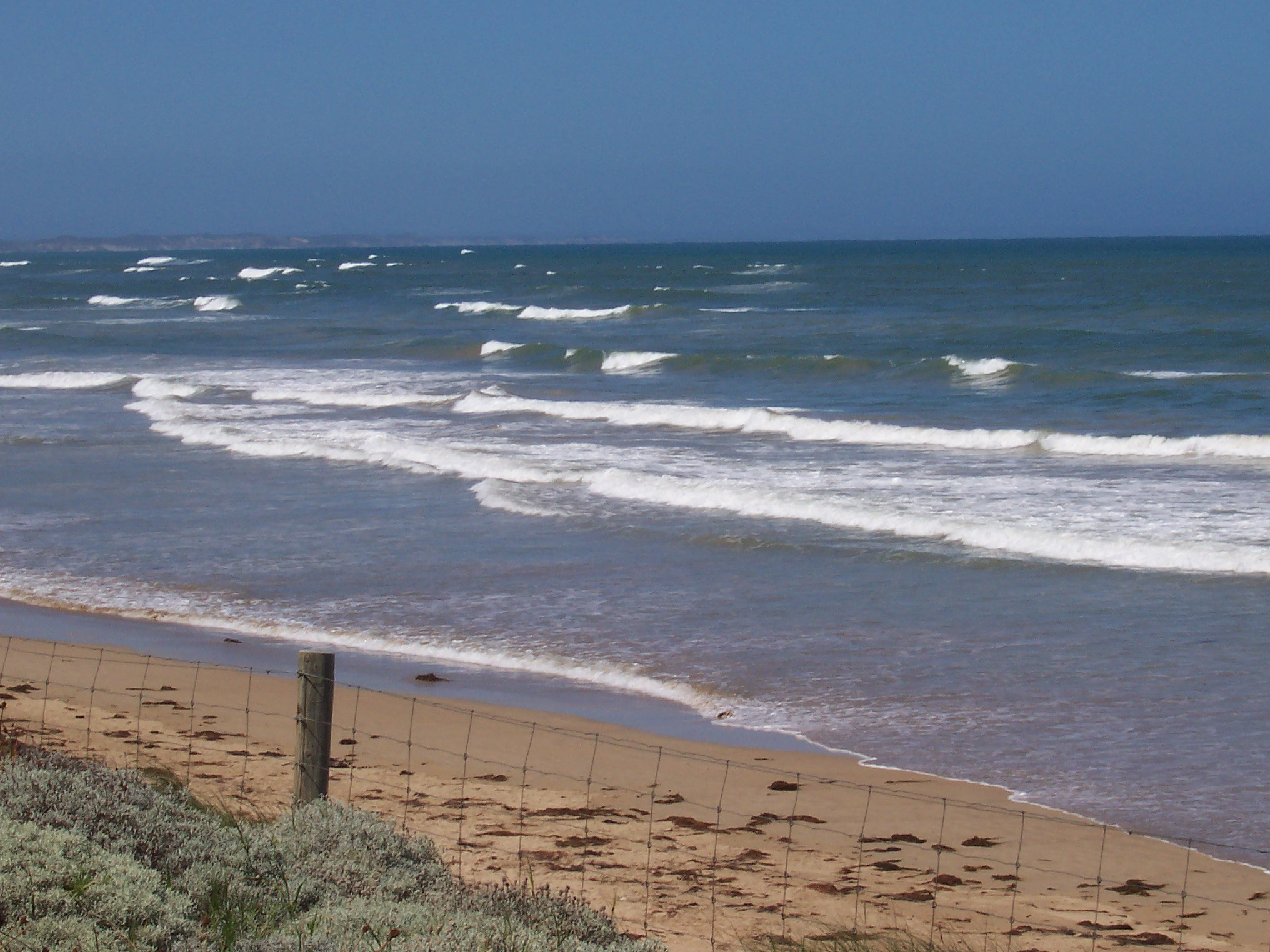
- One of the many beaches at Ocean Grove

- Coordinates: 38°15′0″S 144°31′0″E
- Country: Australia
- State: Victoria
- LGA: City of Greater Geelong
- Location: 98 km (61 mi) SW of Melbourne; 23 km (14 mi) SE of Geelong

Government
  - State electorate: Bellarine
  - Federal division: Corangamite

Population
  - Total: 14,165 (2016 census)
- Postcode: 3226
Localities around Ocean Grove
Wallington	Wallington	Marcus Hill
Wallington	Ocean Grove	Point Lonsdale
Barwon Heads	Bass Strait	Bass Strait

Ocean Grove is a town in Victoria, Australia, located on the Bellarine Peninsula. At the 2021 census, Ocean Grove had a population of 17,714.

== History ==
In 1869, American Methodists established a permanent religious camp community on the coast at Ocean Grove, New Jersey, in the United States of America. It was so successful that they decided to spread their camps overseas, including to Australia. Following a collaboration with the Victorian Methodists, an initial camp was set up near Point Lonsdale. By 1882 they needed to acquire a larger area, so they could establish their Australian Ocean Grove community.

The site chosen was on the eastern side of the mouth of the Barwon River, overlooking Bass Strait.

In 1887, Charles James and James Grigg purchased, surveyed and subdivided land into 2,500 blocks bearing the covenant "no part of the above Land shall be used for the Manufacture or Sale of Malted Spirituous, or Vinous Liquors". Due to this covenant, no bars or public houses could sell liquor within the town limits. The Ocean Grove Coffee Palace was built for the Methodist and Temperance Society, the first church service was held on 1 January 1888, and the population was such that a post office opened on 14 September 1888.

In 1927, the town was linked by the Barwon Heads Bridge to Barwon Heads on the other side of the river, previous access being by rowboat.

Many streets were named after important people in the Methodist community, while the local youth camp was run by the Methodist (later Uniting) Church from the 1920s until 1996.

In 2014, the Victorian Civil and Administrative Tribunal (VCAT) ruled that the liquor ban was no longer enforceable. The township now has a number of bars that can legally serve alcohol.

=== Collendina ===
Collendina is a small section of Ocean Grove. When the town of Ocean Grove was established it was a Methodist town, and it was the ruling of the Methodists that it would remain a dry town. Because Ocean Grove was free of alcohol outlets, the town of Collendina grew up around the Collendina pub and caravan park just outside the Ocean Grove boundary. Eventually the two towns merged to form one urban area. The prohibition was officially lifted in Ocean Grove in 2006, although many cafes and restaurants were already beginning to serve alcoholic drinks.

== Today ==
Now the largest town on the Bellarine Peninsula, Ocean Grove has the largest shopping centre on the peninsula. Only a few blocks from the beach, it is popular with tourists and locals alike. In 2005 a new shopping centre was built in the Collendina area, allowing the locals to shop at both Coles and Woolworths supermarkets.

Ocean Grove has a resident population of about 12,000 which, during the school summer holidays, swells to four times this number as tourists from Melbourne, Geelong, interstate, and overseas flock in. The area offers surf beaches, fishing, kayaking, canoeing, bushwalking swimming and other outdoor activities. The Ocean Grove Nature Reserve preserves some remnant native woodland and contains walking tracks.

Significant infrastructure development in Ocean Grove during 2008-2009 has resulted in two soccer pitches, indoor swimming complex complete with a 25m pool and a four-star Skate Park with Bowl suitable for boards, blades and bikes, and a gym.

While tourism makes the largest contribution to the local economy, during the slower months a larger proportion of local income is derived from orchards, fruit and vegetable growers, and the local wineries.

One of the local newspapers is the Ocean Grove Voice.

In December 2019 the Kingston Village shopping complex located on Grubb Road opened to the public. It is the biggest shopping complex on the peninsula.

== Sport ==
The town has an Australian Rules football team competing in the Bellarine Football League.

The Ocean Grove Soccer Club competes in the Geelong Regional Football Association.

Golfers play at the course of the Ocean Grove Golf Club on Guthridge Street.

The town hosts a Bi-annual Geelong gaming competition with teams from around the greater Geelong region competing for a minor cash prize and qualification for the state competition held in Broadmeadows.

Other Sports: Shell Road Complex & Surrounds

- Indoor Volleyball
- Indoor Basketball
- Indoor Soccer (during summer)
- Indoor Basketball
- Indoor Netball
- Indoor equestrian
- Outdoor Paintball
- Ping Pong League
- Competitive E-Sports

There are also two tennis clubs with modern facilities - Ocean Grove Tennis Club - Madeley St and Surfside Tennis Club - Shell Road (next to the new aquatic and sports centre).

== Popular culture ==
Ocean Grove was featured in the 2006 film Kenny, while the bridge between Ocean Grove and Barwon Heads featured in the popular ABC television show SeaChange. The town is also the home town of fishing personality Ross Gould.

The rock band The Murlocs formed in Ocean Grove.

The metal band Ocean Grove is named after the town.
