= Wallington, Victoria =

Wallington Victoria
- Coordinates: 38°12′S 144°29′E
- Population: 1,364 (2016 census)
- Postcode(s): 3222
- LGA(s): City of Greater Geelong
- State electorate(s): Bellarine
- Federal division(s): Corangamite
Localities around Wallington:
Leopold	Curlewis	Drysdale
Connewarre	Wallington	Mannerim and Marcus Hill
Connewarre	Barwon Heads	Ocean Grove

Wallington is a locality in the Rural City of Geelong. At the 2016 census, the town and surrounding area had a population of 1,353.

The township was settled in the early 1870s, the Post Office opening on 22 February 1872.

Its surrounding suburbs are Leopold, Curlewis, Ocean Grove and Marcus Hill.

It is well known for its popular annual strawberry festival, the Wallington Strawberry Fair, a fundraising event held by Wallington Primary School. A popular water theme park, Adventure Park is located on the outskirts of the township. Wallington also has a Cricket Club who plays at Wallington Recreation Reserve on Wallington Road along with the Bellarine Bears Baseball Club.
