= Angustown School =

School in Victoria, Australia

Angustown School was a government school in the district of Angustown in Victoria, Australia. It was located 140 kilometres (87 mi) north of Melbourne near Nagambie and Whroo.

== History ==
The Angustown School, also known as Bailieston North School, operated from 1889 to 1903.

The school was located near Reedy Lake and close to a sawmill operated by local entrepreneur Angus Cameron, who gave the district its name. The school was placed there at the request of Mr Cameron. The families of the men he employed had 40 children, so he asked that a school be provided for them.

A report by inspector Samuel Ware dated 28 December 1888, describes most of the parents as working at Cameron's mill plus "two have small selections near the sawmill, but they depend for their livelihood on it."

He wrote that 12 children of school age lived within two miles of the school, with 12 others being aged between three and six.

Mr Ware said the children of the district would be unable to attend other schools. Whroo was six miles distant. The nearest school, Bailieston, was 3.5 miles away in a straight line without roads and the "intervening space is often flooded."

The inspector recommended against purchasing a site for the proposed school at Angustown, and noted that Mr Cameron had promised to erect a suitable building.

The department agreed if accommodation could be found for the teacher. It paid Cameron one shilling a year rent for the land on which the school, originally known as Bailieston North, was built. The school opened on 16 May 1889, with Elizabeth Moss as head teacher. Its average attendance that year was 18.

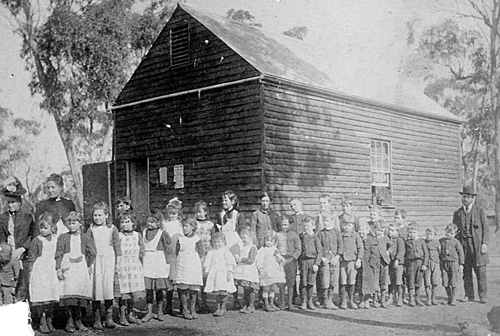
Angustown School, c1900

In June 1889, inspector Dean reported:

"The building has been erected by the residents. It is constructed of hardwood, with the exception of the floor. It has no ceiling and is not lined. No fireplace or chimney has been built, and as the winter threatens to be a severe one, I recommend that an iron chimney be sent at once. I think Mr A. Cameron will undertake to put it up at once. "The outoffices (supplied by the department) have not yet been put up. The teacher informed me that they were delivered on the 12th and that the person who delivered them promised to return very soon and put them up. "Since the 12th the Goulburn has been very high and probably this has prevented the carrier from returning. A tank has also to be delivered."

A 1900 inventory of property shows such items as: An infantry drill, manual of health and temperance, one chart of common birds of Victoria, an alphabet register and corporal punishment register. Books included school readers, a Moral Lesson and Empire History. There were maps of the world, Victoria (very damaged), Europe, Australasia and a war map of South Africa. There was a physics primer, easel, stove and two blackboards.

By March 1902 the school's condition had deteriorated and the department had little interest in maintaining it given declining enrolments.

A letter from the teacher, M. Barrie, dated 10 March 1902, said that when she returned after the Christmas break she found the water tank to be poisoned (a dead bird being the cause). Someone had removed the pipe to get water because the tap was in the schoolroom.

"I had to go to the expense of having it emptied," Miss Barrie wrote.

She was advised the expense would have to be paid for out of her maintenance allowance, which she disputed.

Her complaints continued on 12 September 1902, when she wrote:

"I wish to say that the building is a very poor one. In winter it is very cold and in the summer very hot. At all times very draughty. If it were lined with weatherboards and a fireplace put in it would be very comfortable. "It is almost impossible to keep it clean and all the pictures are spoilt either with the rain, or the smoke from the stove. In my opinion it would cost a great deal to put in proper order."

The school closed in 1903 and the remaining pupils transferred to Whroo.

== The site today ==
There are no visible signs remaining of the school. There are no public buildings in the vicinity and the name Angustown is rarely used.
