= Barwon Heads Bridge =

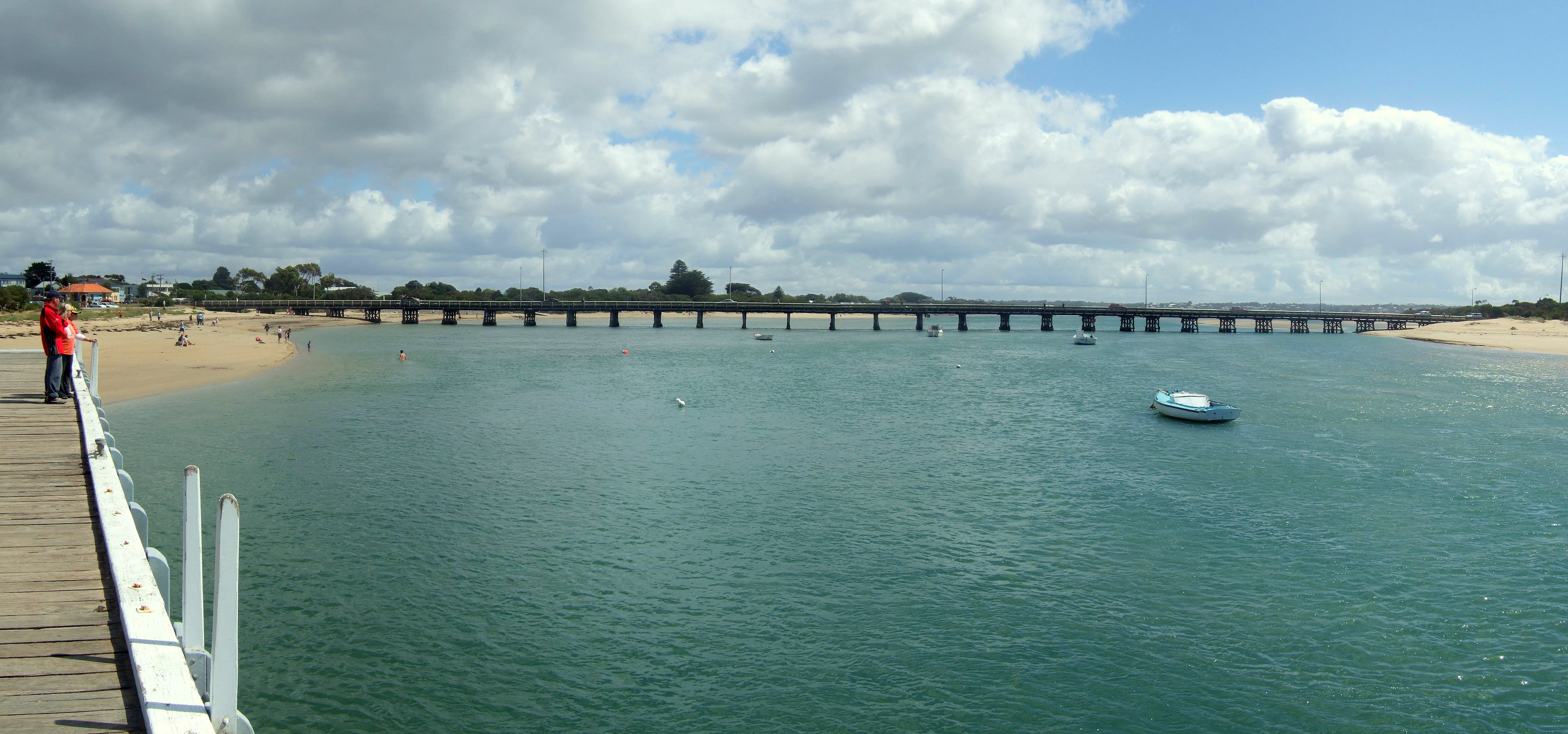
- Barwon Heads Bridge
- Coordinates: 38°16′57″S 144°29′45″E
- Carries: Motor vehicles; Pedestrians on a separate bridge
- Crosses: Barwon River
- Locale: between Barwon Heads and Ocean Grove, Victoria, Australia
- Maintained by: VicRoads

Characteristics
- Design: Beam bridge
- Material: Timber, steel, concrete
- Total length: 308.5 metres (1,012 ft)
- Width: 9 metres (30 ft)
- No. of spans: 34
- Load limit: 44 tonnes (43 long tons; 49 short tons)

History
- Constructed by: McConnell Dowell Constructors (Aust)
- Construction start: May 2009
- Construction end: December 2010
- Replaces: 1927–2010 timber bridge

Location
- Interactive map of Barwon Heads Bridge

The Barwon Heads Bridge is a road bridge and a separate pedestrian bridge across the Barwon River between Barwon Heads and Ocean Grove, Victoria, Australia. The bridge is the only crossing of the Barwon River between Geelong and the river mouth at Barwon Heads.

== History ==
The original timber bridge was the longest surviving example of a timber stringer road bridge in Victoria. It was constructed entirely of timber in 1926–1927, and was a "causeway"-type structure, having a low, flat profile, with closely spaced piers. A 2006 condition report determined that the bridge had reached the end of its effective life and should be replaced.

Major construction initiated by the Victorian Government took place in July 2025 as a part of an upgrade of the bridge.

== Description ==
The new road bridge, which replaced the historic timber bridge, utilised components and design elements of the original Barwon Heads Bridge. The road bridge consists of 34 spans supported by 185 treated timber piles (five timber piles to each pier), galvanised steel I beams and reinforced concrete deck. The piers are spaced to match the original timber bridge. The bridge is 308.5 metres (1,012 ft) long and 9 metres (30 ft) wide and it carries two 3.3-metre-wide (11 ft) traffic lanes.

The new 4.5-metre-wide (15 ft) pedestrian bridge is located 10 metres (33 ft) downstream from the new road bridge. It is a modern concrete bridge with 18-metre-long (59 ft) spans supported by one pile per pier.

Construction of the bridge began in May 2009 and it was completed and opened to traffic in December 2010.
