= Mannerim =

- Town
- Coordinates: 38°13′S 144°35′E
- Country: Australia
- State: Victoria
- LGA: City of Greater Geelong

Government
  - State electorate: Bellarine
  - Federal division: Corangamite

Population
  - Total: 88 (2016 census)
- Postcode: 3222
Localities around Mannerim
Drysdale	Drysdale	St Leonards
Wallington	Mannerim	Swan Bay
Marcus Hill	Point Lonsdale	Swan Bay

Mannerim is a locality on the Bellarine Peninsula of Victoria, Australia.

Characterised by hobby farms and wineries, it is centred on the Grubb Road-Bellarine Highway intersection.

== History ==
The Post Office opened on 15 June 1893 and closed in 1975.

Mannerim Primary School opened under its original name of Paywit South State School on 21 May 1891 and closed on 1 January 1974.

From 1914 to 1920, it was the location of a training camp for covert operations infantry for the war in Europe.

=== Heritage listed sites ===
Mannerim contains Victorian Heritage Register listed sites, including:

- Mannerim Railway Station
- Mannerim Primary School
