= Murtnaghurt Lagoon =

- Murtnaghurt Swamp, Lake Murtnaghurt
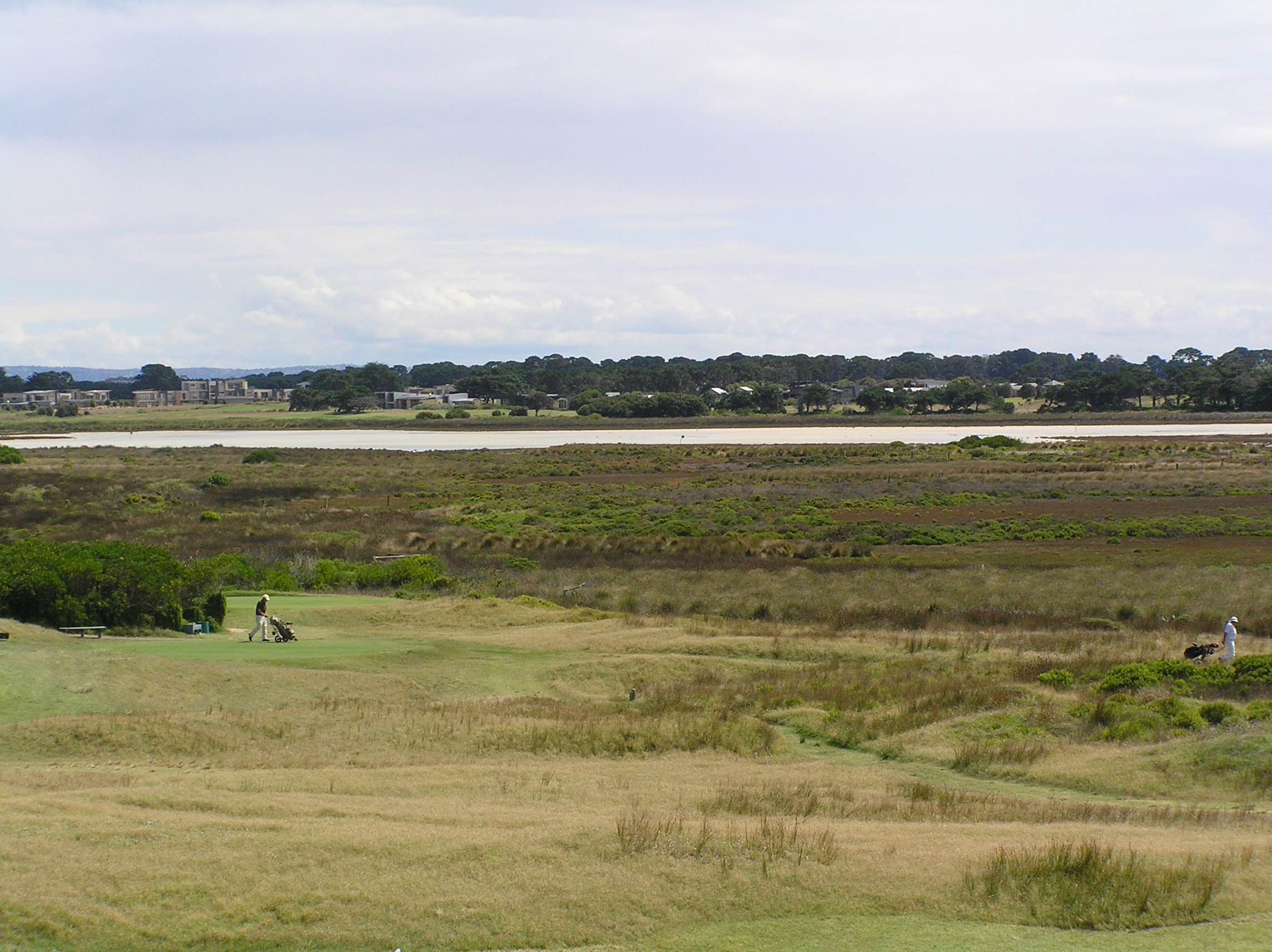
- View from south-east

- Location in Victoria
- Location: Bellarine Peninsula, Victoria
- Coordinates: 38°16′51″S 144°28′8″E
- Type: Ephemeral saline lagoon
- Primary inflows: local
- Primary outflows: none
- Basin countries: Australia
- Max. length: 2 kilometres (1.2 mi)
- Max. width: 350–600 m (1,150–1,970 ft)
- Surface area: 81 hectares (200 acres)

Murtnaghurt Lagoon, also known as Murtnaghurt Swamp or Lake Murtnaghurt, is a shallow, ephemeral wetland west of the town of Barwon Heads on the southern coast of the Bellarine Peninsula in Victoria, Australia. It comprises two enclosed depressions, elongated west-east and separated by a low ridge. The wetland is about 2 kilometres (1.2 mi) in length, and up to 600 metres (2,000 ft) wide, with 4.5 kilometres (2.8 mi) of shoreline enclosing an area of 81 hectares (200 acres). It is connected by a narrow 2.7 kilometres (1.7 mi) palaeochannel extending from the lagoon northwards to the main tidal channel of the lower Barwon River.

== Birds ==
The lagoon is part of the Bellarine Wetlands Important Bird Area and is recognised as an important site supporting, at times, various threatened species of birds, including the little tern, fairy tern, orange-bellied parrot, swift parrot and hooded plover, as well as many waders which use the whole complex of wetlands in the region.

== Status and conservation ==
Murtnaghurt Lagoon is listed under the Ramsar Convention as a wetland of international significance, as part of the Port Phillip Bay (Western Shoreline) and Bellarine Peninsula Ramsar Site. It is also part of the Lake Connewarre State Game Reserve. It is public land which is managed by Parks Victoria and is surrounded by farmland, golf courses and residential housing.. Because of its relatively small size and isolation from the rest of the Lake Connewarre wetland complex it is threatened by edge effects, including pollution from stormwater run-off.

A report by Neville Rosengren for the Save Barwon Heads Alliance recommended that the lagoon should be protected by a geoheritage conservation zone of low intensity land use. It stated that:

"The key elements of this site are relatively inconspicuous, low relief landforms that preserve the materials and the geometry of the earlier sea level landscapes. Research into geoscience features is an ongoing activity as new techniques of analysis and particularly for methods of mapping and displaying geomorphology and dating materials and landforming events become available. Intensive land uses involving close residential sub-division, excavation or other substantial reshaping of landscape would substantially degrade the geoscience significance – and make the materials unavailable for scientific access. The opportunity for further research and monitoring of the processes that formed Murtnaghurt Lagoon would be greatly compromised by extending urban or other high intensity built developments enclosing and adjacent to the site. These activities should not be permitted in the areas enclosing the Murtnaghurt Lagoon."

== See also ==
- List of lakes of Australia § Victoria
