= Bellarine Wetlands Important Bird Area =

Important Bird Area in Victoria, Australia

Coordinates: 38°13′13″S 144°26′41″E

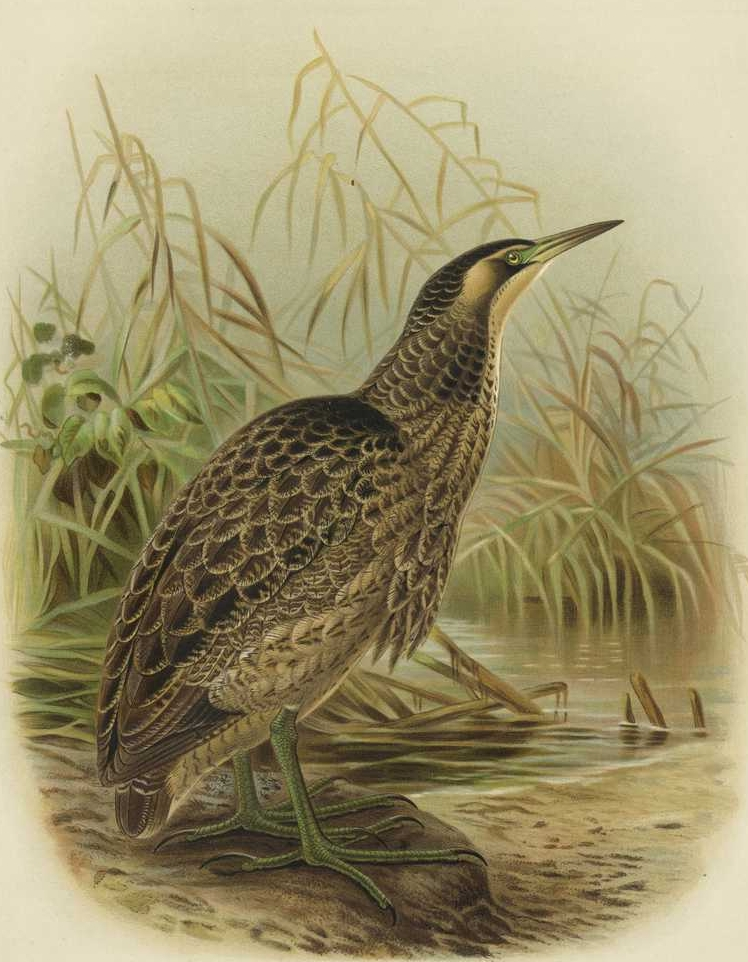
The IBA is an important site for Australasian bitterns

The Bellarine Wetlands Important Bird Area comprises a group of wetland sites, with a collective area of 46 km^{2}, at the western end of the Bellarine Peninsula in Victoria, south-eastern Australia. The site is important for waterbirds and orange-bellied parrots.

== Description ==
The wetlands include the Moolap saltworks, with the adjacent intertidal mudflats of Point Henry and Corio Bay, and the extensive wetlands of Reedy Lake, Hospital Swamp and Lake Connewarre. Reedy Lake is contiguous with Hospital Swamp, Lake Connewarre, Salt Swamp, Murtnaghurt Lagoon and the Barwon River estuary. Moolap is a commercial saltworks and much of Point Henry is occupied by an aluminum smelter; the other wetlands are state game reserves. Reedy Lake is freshwater; Moolap, Hospital Swamp and Connewarre are saline. The Reedy Lake - Lake Connewarre system is part of the Port Phillip and Bellarine Peninsula Ramsar site.

== Birds ==
The wetlands have been identified as an Important Bird Area (IBA) by BirdLife International because they support significant numbers of critically endangered orange-bellied parrots, endangered Australasian bitterns and over 1% of the world populations of chestnut teals, sharp-tailed sandpipers, red-necked stints and banded stilts.
