= Point Lonsdale =

Coastal village in Victoria, Australia

- Town
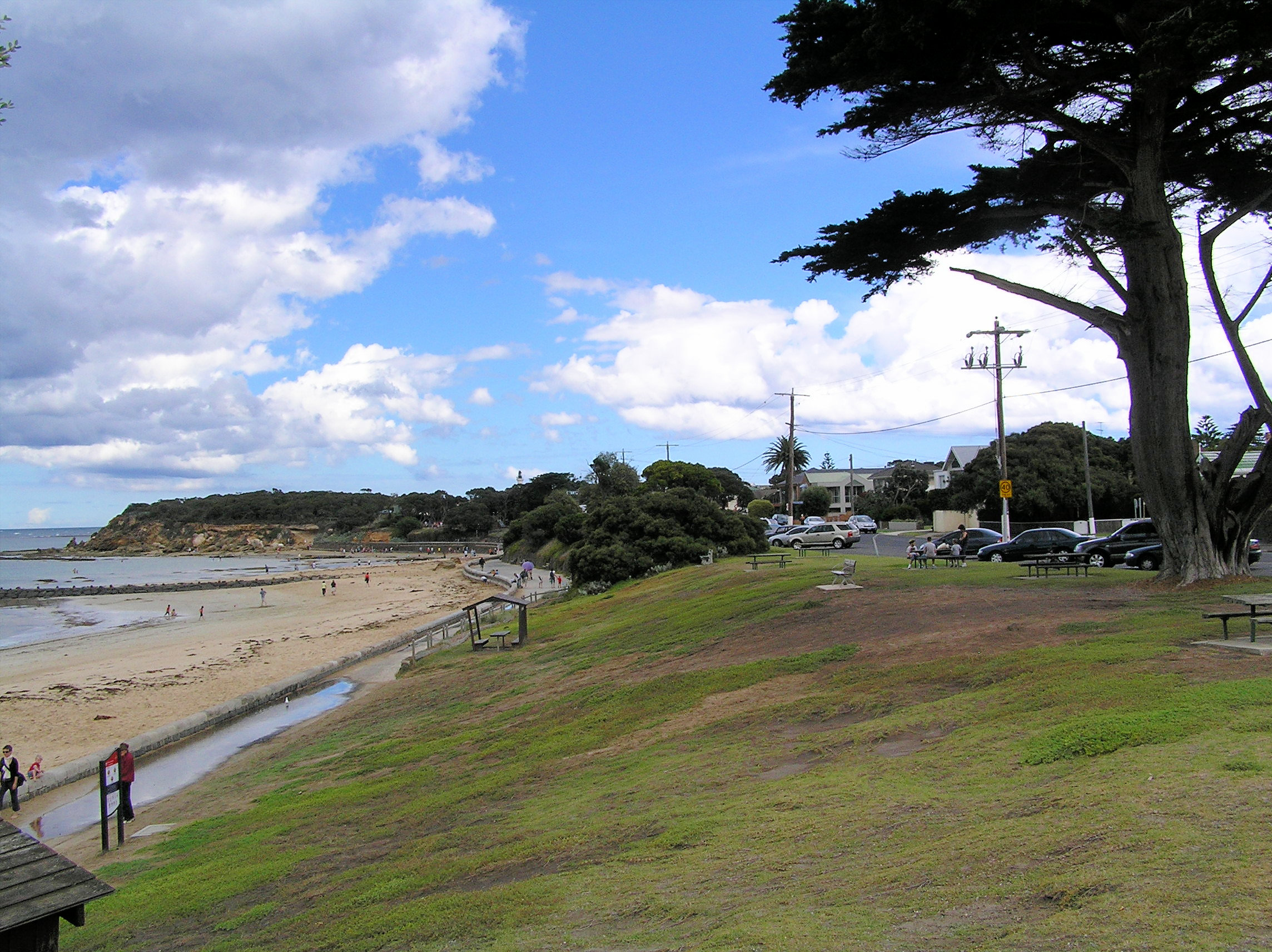

- Coordinates: 38°16′21″S 144°36′49″E
- Country: Australia
- State: Victoria
- LGAs: Borough of Queenscliffe; City of Greater Geelong
- Location: 103 km (64 mi) SW of Melbourne; 28 km (17 mi) SE of Geelong

Government
  - State electorate: Bellarine
  - Federal division: Corangamite

Population
  - Total: 2,684 (2016 census)
- Postcode: 3225
Localities around Point Lonsdale
Marcus Hill	Mannerim	Swan Bay
Ocean Grove	Point Lonsdale	Queenscliff
Bass Strait	Bass Strait	Bass Strait

Point Lonsdale is a town on the Bellarine Peninsula, near Queenscliff, Victoria, Australia. The town is divided between the Borough of Queenscliffe and the City of Greater Geelong. Point Lonsdale is also one of the headlands which, with Point Nepean, frame The Rip, the entrance to Port Phillip. The headland is dominated by the Point Lonsdale Lighthouse.

At the 2016 census, Point Lonsdale had a population of 2,684. The population grows rapidly from summer to Easter due to its popularity as a holiday destination.

== History ==
The traditional owners of this area are the Wautharong people of the Kulin nation. The escaped convict William Buckley, the first known European to have lived in the area, lived with the Wautharong people from 1803 to 1835. A signal station was built in 1854.

Permanent European settlement began at Point Lonsdale in the latter half of the 19th century with the construction of a lighthouse in 1863 and the extension of the railway line from Geelong to Queenscliff in 1879. Since settlement, many ships have been wrecked on the rocky reefs at the entrance to Port Phillip.

The post office opened in January 1902.

The town is named after police officer William Lonsdale and is the birthplace of former Premier of Victoria Thomas Hollway.

=== Heritage listed sites ===
Point Lonsdale contains several Victorian Heritage Register listed sites, including:

- 7 Glaneuse Road, Arilpa
- 57–73 Glaneuse Road, Ballara
- 2 Point Lonsdale Road, Point Lonsdale Maratime and Defence Precinct which includes the towns lightouse
- 159 Point Lonsdale Rd, The Queenscliff Cemetery

== Environment ==
Next to the town is Lake Victoria, a shallow saline lake that is part of the Lonsdale Lakes Nature Reserve and an important site for the waterbirds and migratory waders that form part of the population using the Ramsar-listed Swan Bay wetland system.

The coastal rock platforms and adjacent waters are included in the Port Phillip Heads Marine National Park. The intertidal platforms have the highest invertebrate diversity of any calcarenite reef in Victoria, while subtidal areas are characterised by diverse and abundant algal communities as well as by encrusting organisms such as ascidians, sponges and bryozoans.

Along the open coast there are regular sightings of threatened marine mammals such as humpback and southern right whales.

== Other ==
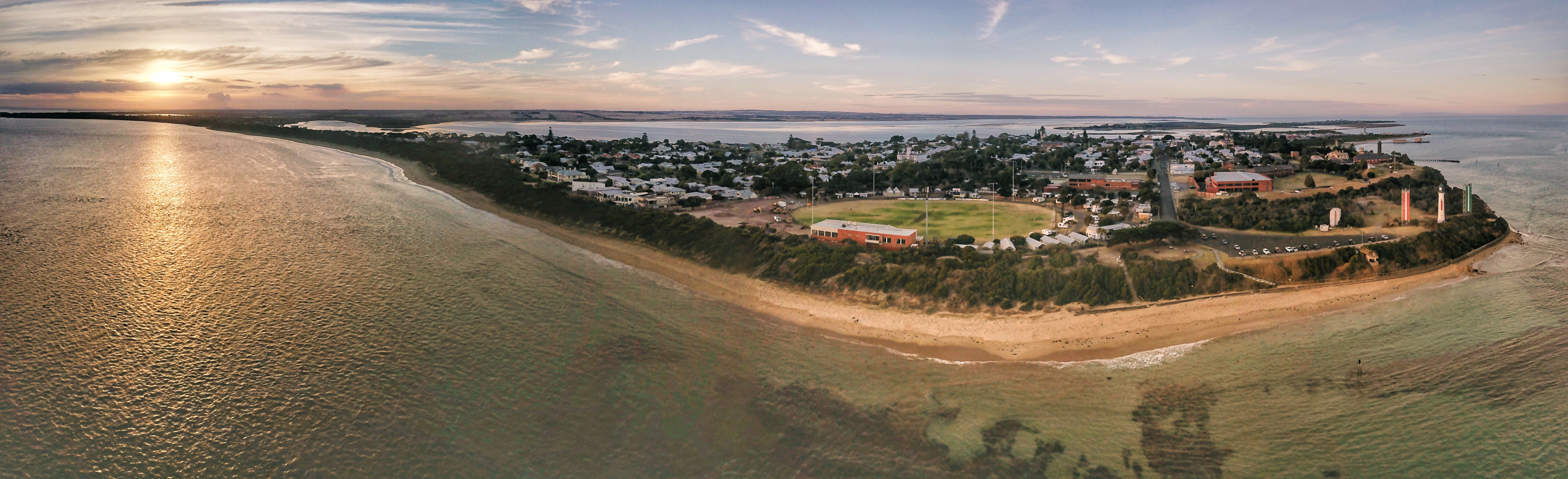
Aerial perspective of Point Lonsdale's lighthouses

Point Lonsdale has a large 100-year-old Norfolk Pine, 'The Christmas Tree', that is lit up on the first Saturday in December, at the end of an evening of A Community Celebration of Christmas. The Community Celebration of Christmas is run by a committee of volunteers assisted by the local service clubs, Lions and Rotary. The focus of the event is the community and children. Each year the lights are turned on by a special guest, or guests of honour chosen for their contribution to the Community.

The Borough of Queenscliffe has a high percentage of volunteers and it is usually volunteers that are chosen as the special guest/guests of honour in recognition of their contribution to the community. Santa arrives at 7:25 pm in the local Fire Brigade Truck, whilst throwing lollies to the children, to start an evening of entertainment by local performers. Glowcandles are sold as a fundraiser for maintaining equipment on the tree, with all profits supporting the ongoing lighting of the tree.

The tree is decorated by community volunteers and service club members coordinated by The Christmas Tree Committee. Festooning is hauled up by hand and manually secured into the tree. This tree can be found at the corner of Grimes Road and Point Lonsdale Rd, Point Lonsdale, Victoria. When lit up this tree can be seen for miles out to sea and is a Queenscliffe Borough icon, having been lit since about 1952–1953. When the lights are on, you know Christmas is getting close.

The township of Point Lonsdale was used in some episodes of the hit children's series Round the Twist for some exterior scenes.

== Sport ==
Golfers play at the course of the Lonsdale Links Golf Club on Fellows Road, rated a Top 20 course in Australia, after undergoing a major renovation. Bowlers bowl at the Point Lonsdale Bowling Club. Surfers surf with the Point Lonsdale Boardriders Club The tennis club is open to members and their guests.

== Gallery ==
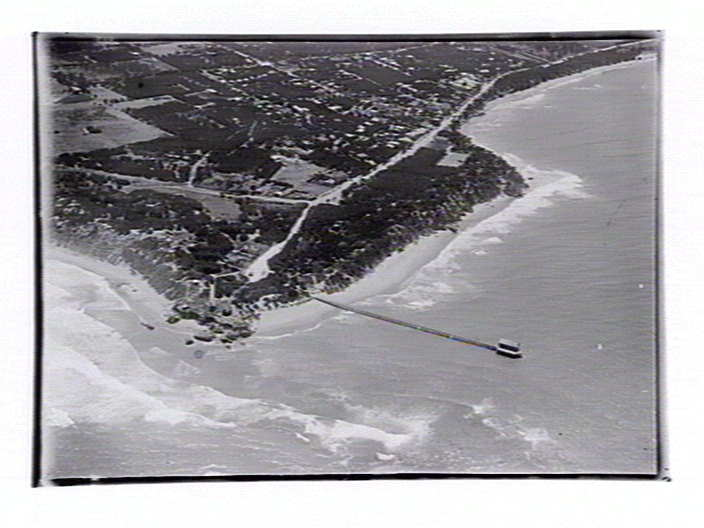
An aerial view of Point Lonsdale

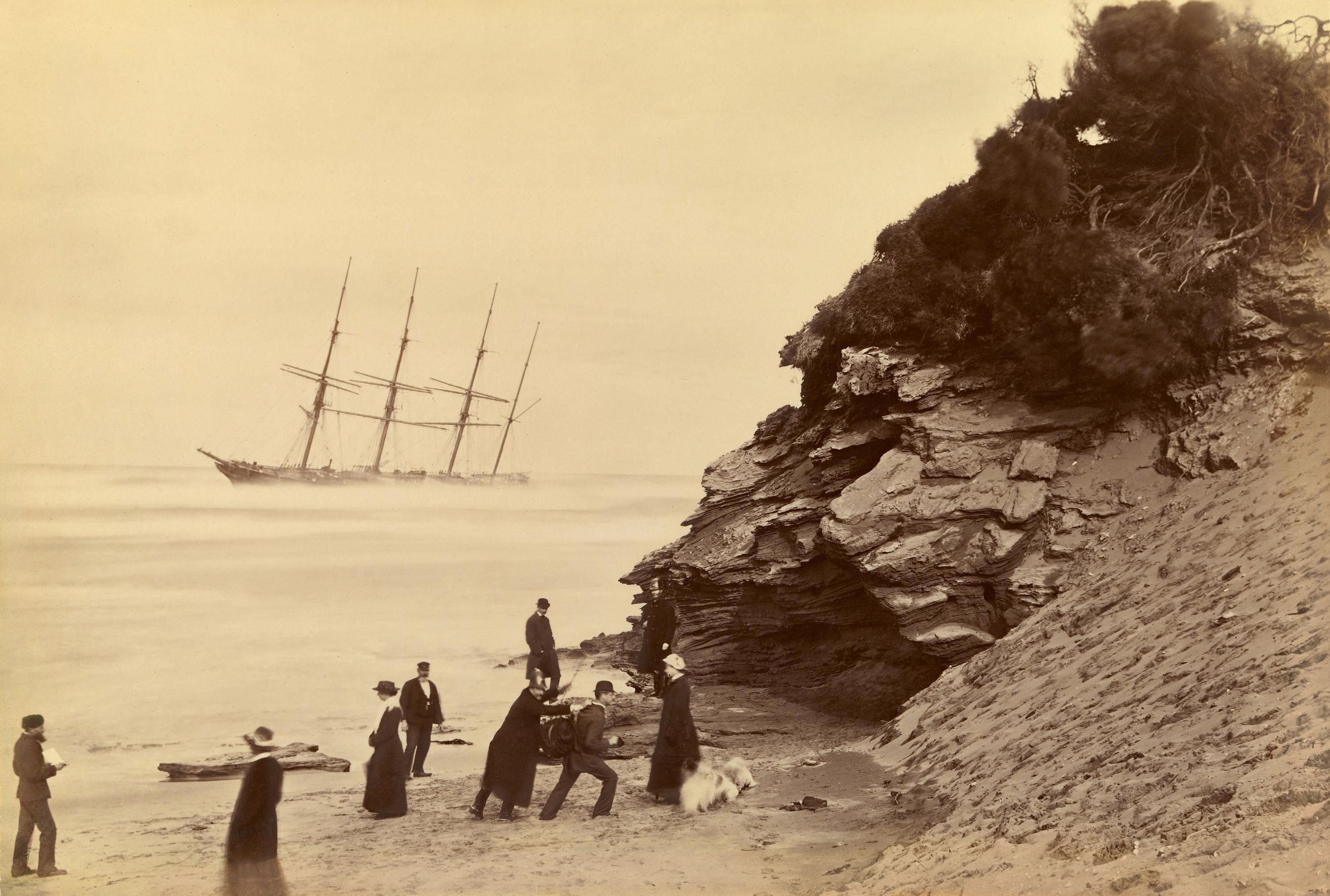
The 1883 wreck of the George Roper, Point Lonsdale. Photographer Fred Kruger
