= George Roper (ship) =

Sunken barque (1883)

Coordinates: 38.295°S 144.615°E

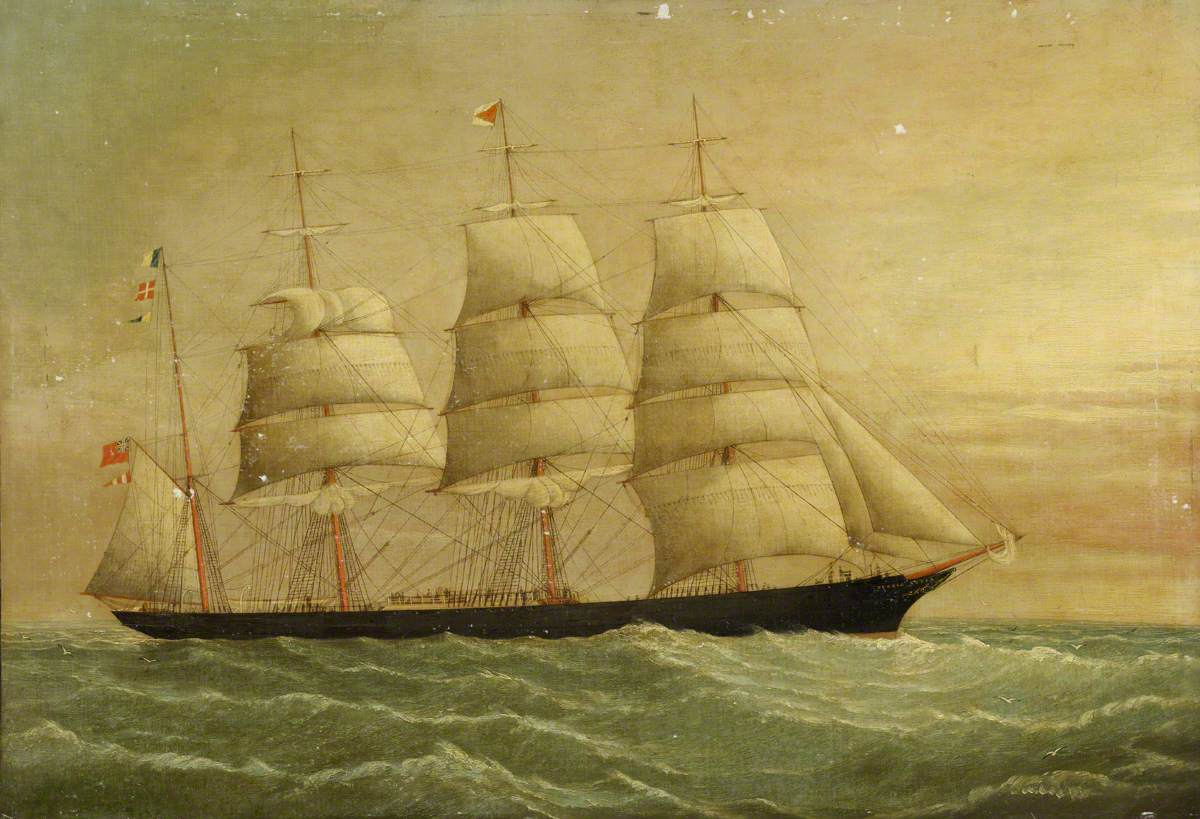
- The Four-masted Barque 'George Roper' by Joseph Witham

History

England
- Name: George Roper
- Owner: W. T. Dickson and Son
- Route: England to Australia
- Builder: W. H. Potter and Son
- Maiden voyage: 10 February 1883, Liverpool
- Fate: Broke up and sunk at Point Lonsdale on 26 August 1883

General characteristics
- Type: Iron barque
- Tonnage: 2,104 GRT; 2,033 NRT
- Length: 301.7 ft (92.0 m)
- Beam: 39.1 ft (11.9 m)
- Depth: 23.6 ft (7.2 m)
- Sail plan: Four-masted

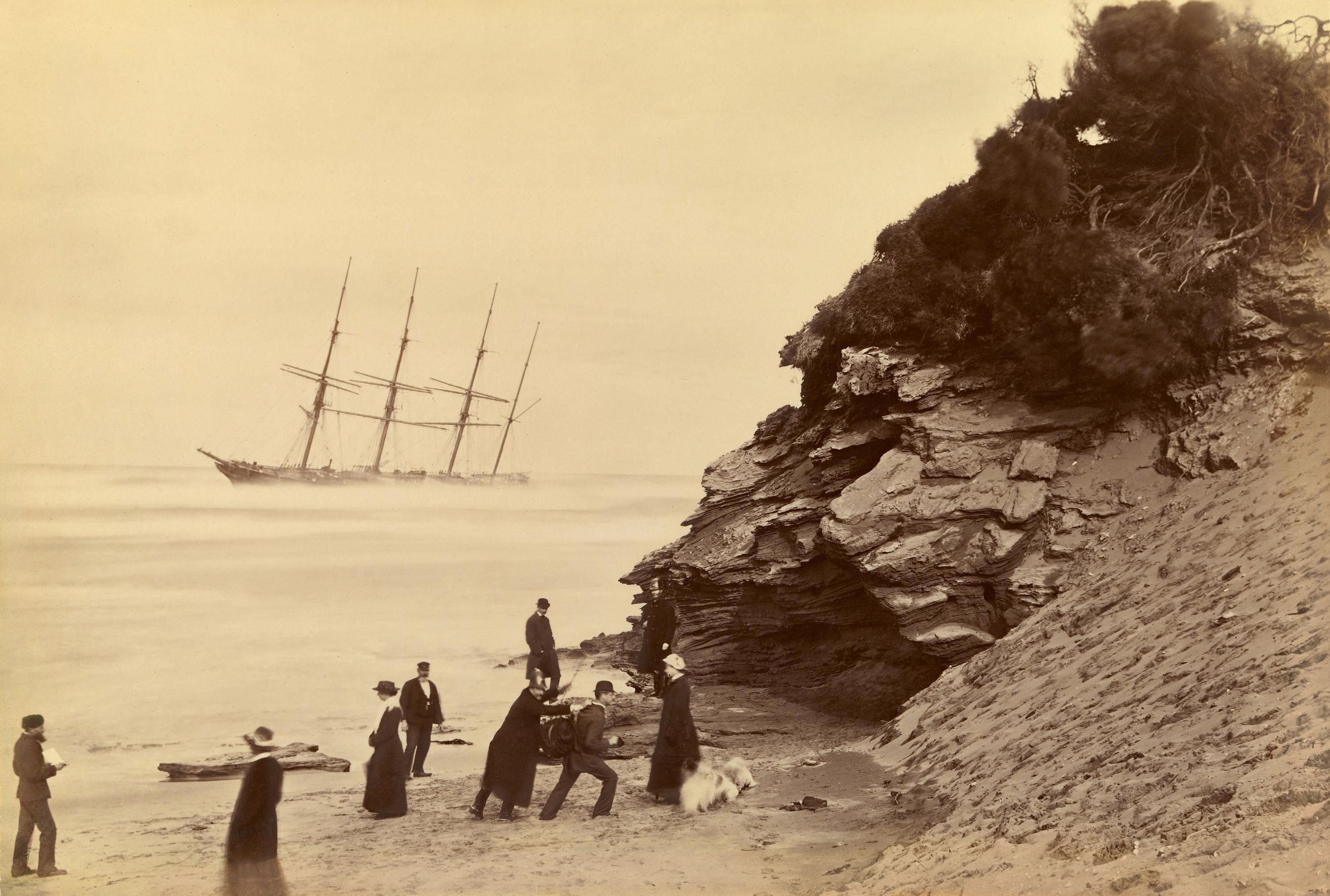
Wreck of the ship George Roper, Point Lonsdale by Fred Kruger

George Roper was a four-masted iron barque that was built for service between England and Australia, launching from Liverpool on 10 February 1883. On its maiden voyage, it carried 3,842 tons of cargo, including railway track for the Victorian government, liquor, chemicals, drapery, and dynamite. It reached Australia on 4 July 1883, but got caught on the reef at Point Lonsdale while being towed into Port Melbourne. The ship sat there for nearly two months before breaking up and sinking on 26 August. The wreck remains under 4–5 metres of water and is accessible to recreational divers.

== Design and construction ==
The four-masted barque George Roper was built of iron in Liverpool by W. H. Potter and Son for local shipowners W. T. Dickson and Son, specifically for service between England and Australia. Its registered tonnages were 2,104 gross and 2,033 net, and dimensions were length 301.7 feet (92.0 m), beam 39.1 feet (11.9 m), and depth 23.6 feet (7.2 m).

When launched into the River Mersey on 10 February 1883, the ship, running free, was struck by the iron cargo steamer Bentinck, outward from Garston for Belfast, loaded with coal, and narrowly missed the larger steamer Merchant. Considerable repairs to George Roper were required as well as the usual outfitting before delivery to its owners. In subsequent litigation, the shipbuilder was held entirely to blame for failing to take the usual precautions before launching into the fairway; they had not placed a well-flagged tug where it could be clearly seen and could warn oncoming vessels, and had not checked whether the river was clear before commencing the launching.

On completion the ship was registered at Liverpool as George Roper, and allocated Official Number 87813 and signal letters HKLR as identifiers.

== Maiden voyage and loss ==
The ship left Liverpool for Port Melbourne on its maiden voyage on 11 April 1883, on Gracie, Beazley and Company's "Australasian Line". It was carrying 3,842 tons of cargo, including 1,400 tons of railway track for the Victorian government (valued at £20,000) as well as liquor, chemicals, drapery, and 30 tons of dynamite, for a total value of £50,000. While coming in to Port Melbourne on 4 July, it encountered headwinds at Bass Strait so the steam tug Williams under the command of Pilot Gifford (or possibly Gafford) began to tow the George Roper into port. However, the tug drifted too far west after encountering a sudden heavy fog, and the tug hit the reef at Point Lonsdale. While the Williams was able to free itself, the George Roper also hit the reef, and it became stuck. After discovering the ship was taking on water, the captain John Ward and his 31 crew were transferred to another ship (the Albatross) and brought to safety at Queenscliff.

It was initially believed that the ship could be refloated at high tide, but this proved impossible. The underwriters sold the salvage rights to a Melbourne syndicate, who recovered much of the cargo before selling the remaining salvage to a Geelong syndicate. During the salvage, on 8 July, the tugboat Blackboy also sank after ropes got tangled around its propeller and it hit the reef before navigation could be restored. All crew were rescued without harm. The George Roper finally broke up and sank on 26 August.

In the investigation of the accident, Pilot Gifford (or Gafford) of the Williams was accused of negligence for not bringing the George Roper back to safer water when the fog came in. His licence was suspended for two years.

== Remaining wreck ==
The shipwreck is in 4–5 metres (13–16 ft) of water and is accessible to recreational divers, with parts of it remaining clearly identifiable. Artefacts were recovered from the wreck in the 1970s and 1980s, some of which are held by the government of Victoria.

Despite the ship's short career, a painting of the George Roper was made by Joseph Witham. It is currently in the collections of the (British) National Maritime Museum.
