= Marcus Hill, Victoria =

Marcus Hill
- Town
- Coordinates: 38°14′S 144°34′E
- Country: Australia
- State: Victoria
- LGA: City of Greater Geelong

Government
  - State electorate: Bellarine
  - Federal division: Corangamite

Population
  - Total: 159 (2016 census)
- Postcode: 3222
Localities around Marcus Hill
Wallington	Mannerim	Mannerim
Wallington	Marcus Hill	Mannerim
Ocean Grove	Ocean Grove	Point Lonsdale

Marcus Hill is a locality of the City of Greater Geelong local government area on the Bellarine Peninsula, Victoria, Australia to the east of Ocean Grove. As of the 2016 census, Marcus Hill had a population of 159.

== History ==
Marcus Hill Post Office opened on 7 May 1883 and closed in 1978.

Marcus Hill Rural School opened on 1 June 1870 and became the Marcus Hill State School (No. 1370) on 1 January 1874. The original school closed on 31 January 1878, after the state government purchased a site for a permanent school. It was replaced by the new Queenscliff Road State School (No. 2029) on 1 February 1878, which was renamed Marcus Hill in 1905. Marcus Hill Primary School was closed at the end of 1993 and the buildings were removed.
