= Reedy Lake =

Lake or swamp in Victoria, Australia

- Lake Reedy
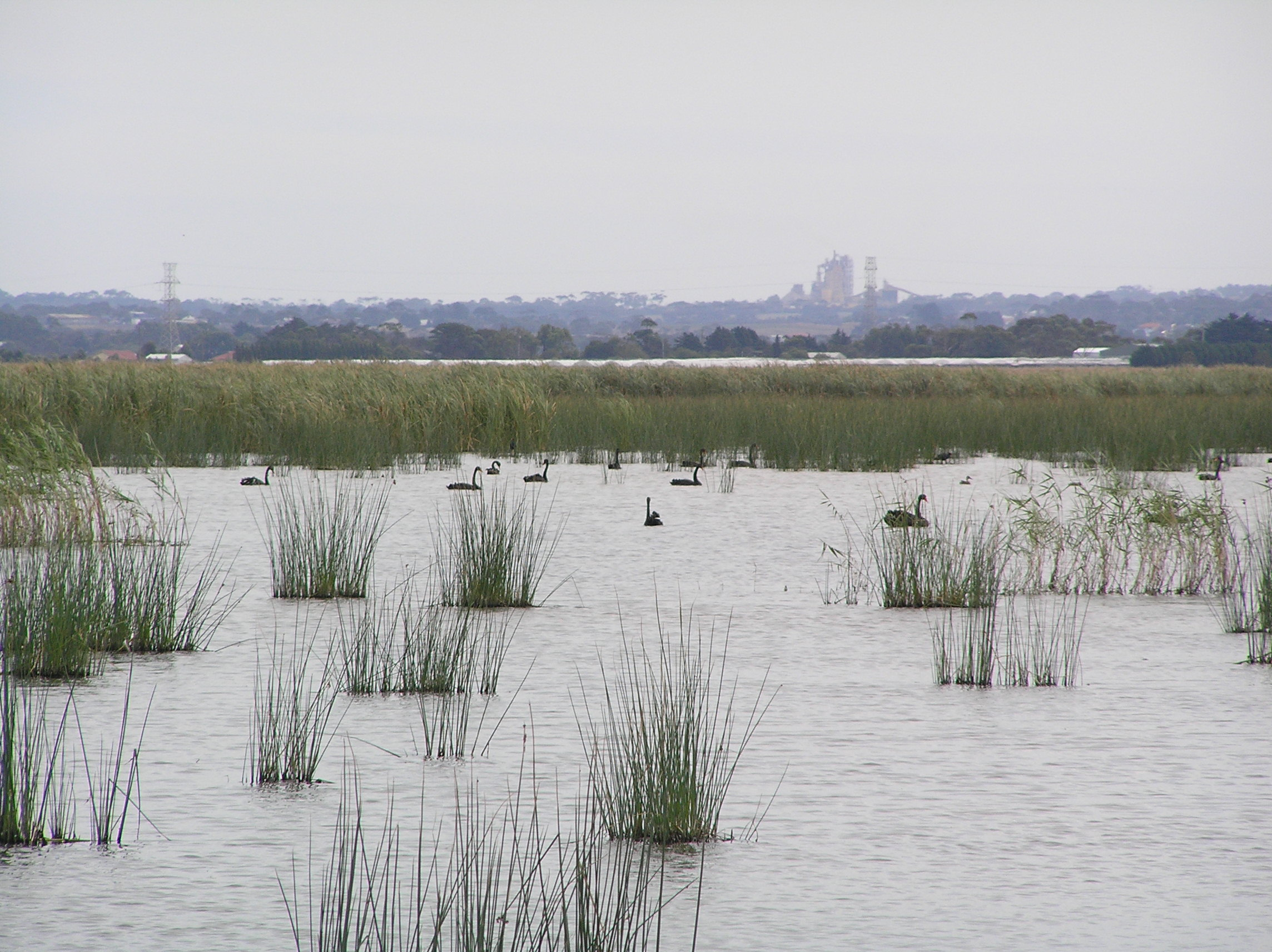
- View of lake with black swans

- Location in Victoria
- Location: Bellarine Peninsula, Victoria, Australia
- Coordinates: 38°12′21″S 144°25′13″E
- Type: Intermittent freshwater swamp
- Primary inflows: Barwon River
- Primary outflows: Barwon River
- Basin countries: Australia
- Surface area: 5.5 km^{2} (2.1 sq mi)
- Average depth: 0.5–2 m (1 ft 8 in – 6 ft 7 in)

Reedy Lake, historically also known as Lake Reedy, is a shallow 5.5-square-kilometre (2.1 sq mi) intermittent freshwater lake or swamp on the lower reaches of the Barwon River, on the Bellarine Peninsula southeast of Geelong in the Australian state of Victoria.

== Location and features ==
The lake is included in the Lake Connewarre State Game Reserve, managed by Parks Victoria and is the largest freshwater swamp in central Victoria, and is part of a wetland complex which includes Hospital Swamp, Lake Connewarre, Salt Swamp and the Barwon estuary. The lake's outlet to the tidal lower Barwon River is controlled by a weir. The lake is listed under the Ramsar Convention as a wetland of international significance, as part of the Port Phillip Bay (Western Shoreline) and Bellarine Peninsula Ramsar Site.

== History ==
Six thousand years ago Reedy Lake was part of a large marine bay. With a subsequent change in relative sea level it was cut off from the sea by a barrier of sand dunes, and its bed covered by a layer of alluvial clay deposited by the Barwon River. Before European settlement of the area in the early 19th century the lake was an ephemeral wetland that became saline in summer from the seepage of salty ground-water and occasional exceptionally high tides. In winter it usually became fresh, as river floods flushed out the saline water.

The first barrier across the Barwon was built in 1838 to provide fresh water for Geelong. In 1899 a second barrier, known as the 'lower breakwater' was built further downstream on the river at the southern boundary of Reedy Lake, making it a predominantly freshwater wetland, with an extensive cover of vegetation, that supported diverse populations of waterbirds and other aquatic wildlife. By the 1930s its natural values were becoming appreciated and, in 1935, it was temporarily reserved for "public purposes". Later it was protected permanently and its level of protection upgraded to that of game reserve. During the 1950s, 1960s and 1970s further works were carried out and refinements added, such as inlet pipes from the river above the lower breakwater and an outlet channel with a flow regulator, to maintain and control water levels in the lake.

In the early 1990s the lake began to suffer degradation as the more permanent and deeper water levels allowed a large population of the introduced common carp to build up. The feeding behaviour of the carp undermined the reedbeds and increased water turbidity, leading to the death of submerged plants, decreased oxygen levels and the decline of small aquatic wildlife. This was remedied in 1996-1997 by drying out the lake to kill the carp before allowing it to fill again. Since then water levels have been closely managed, with some seasonal drying in summer, to limit carp numbers and to maintain areas of open water as waterbird habitat.

== Flora and fauna ==
The lake is floristically rich and includes some 50 native freshwater aquatic vascular plants. There are freshwater, subsaline and saline plant communities, with zones of saltmarsh and sedgeland around the perimeter of the lake shifting in response to changing water levels. Other plant communities are Muehlenbeckia shrubland, samphire herbland and Phragmites australis reedswamp. There are areas of open water round the edge of the lake and as channels and lagoons in the reedbeds, as well as a central area in the deepest part of the lake known as the "Big Hole".

A wide variety of waterbird species use the lake, many of them breeding there, sometimes in large numbers. In spring straw-necked ibis, Australian white ibis and royal spoonbills form large breeding colonies, sometimes of up to 10,000-20,000 birds. Other waterbirds with recorded counts of over 1000 at some time include the Australian shelduck, Pacific black duck, Australasian shoveler, grey and chestnut teal, purple swamphen, Eurasian coot, red-necked stint, sharp-tailed sandpiper, silver gull and whiskered tern. Other species of which the lake is recorded as holding regionally high numbers are magpie geese, glossy ibis, brolga, Australian spotted crake, black-tailed godwit, marsh sandpiper, black-winged stilt, red-kneed dotterel and white-winged black tern. The lake is a stronghold of the endangered Australasian bittern. The lake and its associated wetlands are part of the Bellarine Wetlands Important Bird Area.

== See also ==
- Angustown School
- List of lakes of Australia § Victoria
