= Lake Connewarre =

Estuarine lake in Victoria, Australia

- Kunawarr keelingk (Wathawurrung)
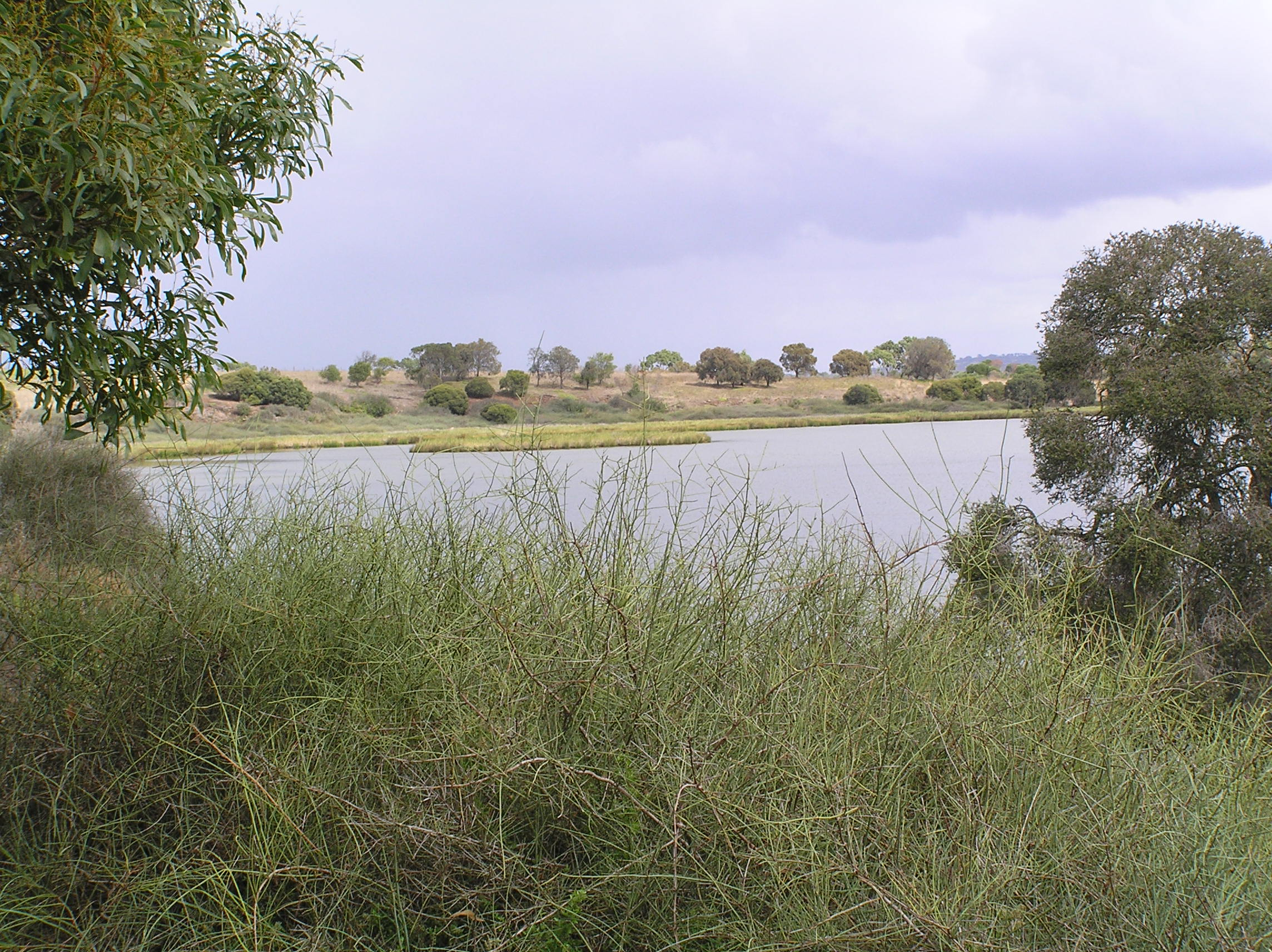
- View of lake from Tait Point

- Location in Victoria
- Location: Bellarine Peninsula, Victoria
- Coordinates: 38°13′29″S 144°27′21″E
- Type: Estuarine
- Primary inflows: Barwon River
- Primary outflows: Barwon River
- Basin countries: Australia
- Surface area: 880 hectares (2,200 acres)
- Average depth: 0.5–2 m (1 ft 8 in – 6 ft 7 in)

Lake Connewarre (Aboriginal Wathawurrung language: Kunawarr keelingk literally meaning black swan lake), a shallow estuarine 880-hectare (2,200-acre) lake on the Barwon River, is located on the Bellarine Peninsula southeast of Geelong in the Australian state of Victoria.

== Location and features ==
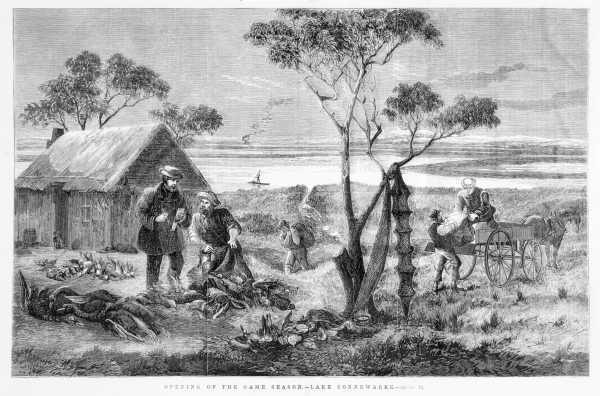
Opening of the game season at Lake Connewarre, 1874

It is adjacent to, and downstream from, the freshwater Reedy Lake. Lake Connewarre is linked to the sea by the mangrove-fringed channel of the lower Barwon River estuary, resulting in the lake being subject to tidal flows, with a weir at the inflow to the lake preventing saline water progressing upstream.

Lake Connewarre forms part of the Port Phillip Bay (Western Shoreline) and Bellarine Peninsula Ramsar Site as a wetland of international importance, with much of the wetland area also part of the Lake Connewarre State Game Reserve. However, most of the land surrounding Lake Connewarre has been cleared for agricultural purposes resulting in environmental degradation. Water pollution from upriver has also resulted in a drop in water quality, and reduced inflows to the lake have caused silting problems. The lake is shallow being less than one metre in depth and generally unsuitable for boating.

== Fauna ==
The lake and its associated wetlands are part of the Bellarine Wetlands Important Bird Area because of its conservation significance for several species of waders, waterbirds and the orange-bellied parrot.

The lake is fished commercially for short-finned eel. It also usually contains yellow-eye mullet, black bream and Australian salmon. Other fish may be present, depending on salinity levels.

== See also ==
- List of lakes of Australia § Victoria
