= List of schools in Geelong =

The city of Geelong, Australia, has a number of schools.

== History ==
The first schools in Geelong were established when the town was settled from the 1850s. Many of these schools remain open today, now joined by a number of new schools opened from the 1950s when the population of Geelong grew after World War II.

King Charles III spent two terms at the Timbertop campus of Geelong Grammar School in 1966.

The late 1980s and 1990s saw changes to the school system, with new secondary colleges such as Saint Ignatius College and Western Heights College were created from smaller secondary schools. It was also at this time that a number of technical schools were closed, and primary schools were closed by the Kennett State Government.

Tertiary education began with the Gordon Institute of Technology in 1888. Reform of the university sector resulted in the creation of Deakin University in the 1970s.

In 2010, Western Heights Secondary College began the transition to a newly constructed campus on Vines Road Hamlyn Heights from a three-campus school.

Northern Bay P–12 College was formed in 2011 as a result of a merger of nine schools into one multi-campus college. This process of regeneration of the Corio and Norlane government schools began in 2006 and was driven by the nine school communities to ensure young people and their families in the northern suburbs of Geelong had access to high-quality education in world-class facilities.

Today over 40,000 primary and secondary students are enrolled in schools in Geelong, with another 27,000 students a year enrolled in tertiary and further education courses.

== Primary education ==
School	Suburb	Years	Coed	Founded	Enrolment	Website
Anakie Primary School	Anakie, Victoria					
Ashby Primary School	Geelong West	P–6	Coeducational			website
Barwon Heads Primary School	Barwon Heads, Victoria					
Barwon Valley School (Special School)	Highton, Victoria					
Bell Park North Primary School	Bell Park	K–6	Coeducational			website
Bellaire Primary School	Highton	K–6	Coeducational			website
Belmont Primary School	Belmont	K–6	Coeducational	1856		website
Ceres Primary School	Ceres, Victoria					
Chilwell Primary School	Newtown	K–6	Coeducational			website
Christ the King Primary School	Newcomb	K–6	Coeducational			
Clifton Springs Primary School	Clifton Springs	P–6	Coeducational			website
Drysdale Primary School	Drysdale, Victoria					
Freshwater Creek Steiner School	Freshwater Creek	K–6	Coeducational			website
Fyans Park Primary School	Newtown	K–6	Coeducational			website
Geelong Baptist College – Junior School	Freshwater Creek	K–6	Coeducational			website
Geelong East Primary School	Geelong	K–6	Coeducational			website
Geelong South Primary School	Geelong	K–6	Coeducational			website
Grovedale Primary School	Grovedale	K–6	Coeducational			website
Grovedale West Primary School	Grovedale	P–6	Coeducational			website
Hamlyn Banks Primary School	Hamlyn Heights	K–6	Coeducational			website
Herne Hill Primary School	Geelong	K–6	Coeducational			website
Highton Primary School	Geelong	K–6	Coeducational			website
Holy Family Primary School	Bell Park	K–6	Coeducational			website
Lara Lake Primary School	Lara	K–6	Coeducational			
Lara Primary School	Lara	P–6	Coeducational			website
Leopold Primary School	Leopold, Victoria					
Mandama Primary School	Grovedale	K–6	Coeducational			website
Manifold Heights Primary School	Manifold Heights	K–6	Coeducational			website
Montpellier Primary School	Highton	K–6	Coeducational			website
Moolap Primary School	Moolap	K–6	Coeducational			website
Newcomb Park Primary School	Newcomb	K–6	Coeducational			website
Newtown Primary School	Newtown	P–6	Coeducational			website
Northern Bay College – Hendy Campus P–8	Corio	P–8	Coeducational	2011	280	website
Northern Bay College - Peacock Campus P–8	Norlane	P–8	Coeducational	2011	510	website
Northern Bay College – Tallis Campus P–8	North Shore	P–8	Coeducational	2011	180	website
Northern Bay College – Wexford Campus P–8	Corio	P–8	Coeducational	1971	660	website
Oberon Primary School	Belmont	K–6	Coeducational			website
Oberon South Primary School	Belmont	K–6	Coeducational			website
Rollins Primary School	Bell Post Hill	K–6	Coeducational			website
Roslyn Primary School	Belmont	K–6	Coeducational			website
St John's Lutheran Primary School	Geelong	K–6	Coeducational	1962	350	website
Whittington Primary School	Whittington	K–6	Coeducational			website

== Secondary education ==
School	Suburb	Years	Coed	Founded	Enrolment	Website
Belmont High School	Belmont	7–12	Coeducational	1955	1200	website
Geelong High School	Geelong	7–12	Coeducational	1915	900	website
Grovedale College	Grovedale	7–12	Coeducational	1979	700	website
Lara Secondary College	Lara	7–12	Coeducational			
Matthew Flinders Girls Secondary College	Geelong	7–12	Girls only	1858	1000	website
Newcomb Secondary College	Newcomb	7–12	Coeducational	1969	900	website
North Geelong Secondary College	North Geelong	7–12	Coeducational	1968	1000	website
Northern Bay College – Goldsworthy Campus 9–12	Corio	9–12	Coeducational	2011	1000	website
Oberon High School	Belmont	7–12	Coeducational	1963	900	website
Western Heights College	Hamlyn Heights	7–12	Coeducational	1984	1000	website

=== Private ===
School	Suburb	Years	System	Coed	Founded	Enrolment	Website
Christian College	Geelong	K–12	Christian	Coeducational	1980	1800	website
Clonard College	Herne Hill	7–12	Catholic	Girls Only	1956	750	website
Covenant College	Bell Post Hill	K–12	Independent	Coeducational	1979		website
Geelong Baptist College	Lovely Banks	K–12	Independent	Coeducational	2002	340	website
Geelong College	Newtown	K–12	Independent	Coeducational	1861	1200	website
Geelong Grammar School	Corio	K–12	Independent	Coeducational	1855	1500	website
Geelong Lutheran College	Mount Duneed, Victoria	K–10+	Lutheran	Coeducational	2009		website
Iona College Geelong	Charlemont	7–12	Catholic	Coeducational	2020		website
Kardinia International College	Bell Post Hill	K–12	Independent	Coeducational	1995	1500	website
Sacred Heart College, Geelong	Newtown	7–12	Catholic	Girls only	1860	1350	website
Saint Ignatius College Geelong	Drysdale	7–12	Catholic	Coeducational	2007	1100	website
St. Joseph's College, Geelong	Newtown	7–12	Catholic	Boys only	1935	1540	website

=== Defunct and merged ===
- Catholic Regional College Geelong (into St Ignatius College)
- Chanel College (Geelong) (closed)
- Corio Bay Senior College (formerly Corio Technical School) (into Northern Bay College)
- Corio Primary School (into Northern Bay College)
- Corio South Primary School (into Northern Bay College)
- Corio West Primary School (into Northern Bay College in 2011)
- Flinders Peak Secondary College (into Northern Bay College)
- Geelong East Technical School (had changed name to James Harrison Secondary College) (merged into Newcomb Secondary College)
- Goold College (into Catholic Regional College)
- The Hermitage (into Geelong Grammar School)
- Morongo Girls' College (closed)
- North Geelong Primary School (closed)
- North Shore Primary School (into Northern Bay College)
- Norlane High School (into Northern Bay College)
- Norlane West Primary School (into Northern Bay College)
- Rosewall Primary School (into Northern Bay College)
- St Mary's Technical School (into Catholic Regional College)
- Western Heights Secondary College (Barton Campus) (into Western Heights Secondary College Minerva Campus)

== Tertiary education ==
- Deakin University – Geelong and Waurn Ponds Campuses
- Diversitat Institute of Education and Training Australia – Geelong Campus
- Diversitat Training
- The Centre of Excellence- Geelong campus
- Gordon Institute of TAFE
- Marcus Oldham Farm Management College
- Reformed Theological College
- Victorian Fitness Academy – Geelong Campus
