= Osborne House (Geelong) =

Building in Geelong, Victoria, Australia

Coordinates: 38.11945°S 144.35795°E

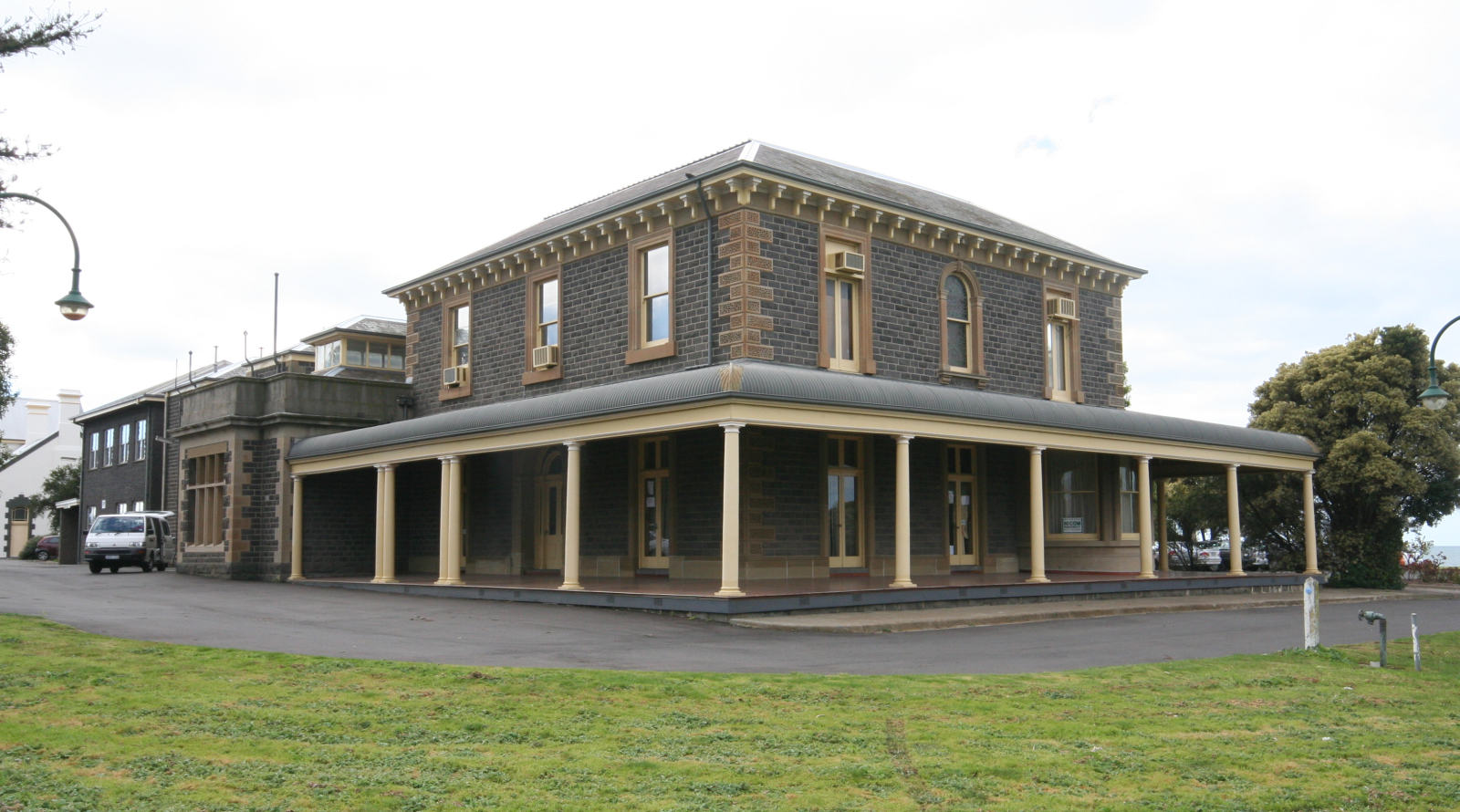
Osborne House

Osborne House is a historic building built in 1858, located in North Geelong, Victoria, Australia.

== History ==
Osborne House was built in 1858 for local squatter, Robert Muirhead, who named the mansion after Osborne House, Queen Victoria's summer residence on the Isle of Wight, England. Muirhead commissioned the leading Melbourne architects Webb and Taylor to undertake the work. He lived at the house until his death in 1862, with the house being sold the following year after the death of his wife. The house was leased for a number of years, but was finally sold by Muirhead's executors to James Francis Maguire in 1878. It is located on what is now Swinburne Street, but on the original 1888 subdivision plan of the St Helen's Estate, it is named Maguire Street.

In 1900, the State Government of Victoria purchased the house as a country residence for the Governor of Victoria, although it was never used as such. The Geelong Harbour Trust purchased the house in 1905 for 6000 pounds. A dining room and seven bedrooms were added in 1910, the Trust using Osborne House as a guest house for a number of years. The Trust offered the house to the Royal Australian Navy in 1911, but the proposal was not accepted at that time.

In 1913, the Navy took up offer to use the house as an officer training college. Improvements to the buildings were carried out, including the erection of a block of buildings as quarters for unmarried seamen, two new classrooms, and alterations to the main room to provide a large barrack for 28 cadets. The college was opened by the Governor General, Lord Thomas Denman on 1 March 1913, with Prime Minister Andrew Fisher present. Lord Denman arrived by torpedo boat, and 200 invited guests arrived by train from Melbourne. The college housed 28 cadets, four petty officers, and 10 seamen, together with the instructors and domestics. The initial class of 28 cadets was chosen from 137 candidates. It was proposed as a permanent location for the naval college because it was close to rail transport and had safe anchorage in Corio Bay, but the institution was relocated to HMAS Creswell at Jervis Bay in 1915.

During World War I, Osborne House was used as a military hospital and, between 1919 and 1924, was used as a base by the Royal Australian Navy Submarine Service for its six J-class submarines. The Geelong Harbour Trust regained control in 1929, with a caretaker being the only resident. In 1937, the Shire of Corio purchased the property for use as its offices. In 1939, the Department of Defence took over the premises to use as an army training centre.

In 1945, the Shire of Corio regained control of Osborne House for its offices. The shire purchased adjoining land in 1947, and remodelled the offices in 1966. The amalgamation of the shire into the City of Greater Geelong in 1995 saw the house lie empty for a time.

== Today ==
Today the stables are abandoned and used to house the Geelong Maritime Museum and the Geelong Memorial Brass Band, the house itself housing various community groups.
