= North Shore, Victoria =

Coordinates: 38°05′56″S 144°22′23″E

North Shore Geelong, Victoria
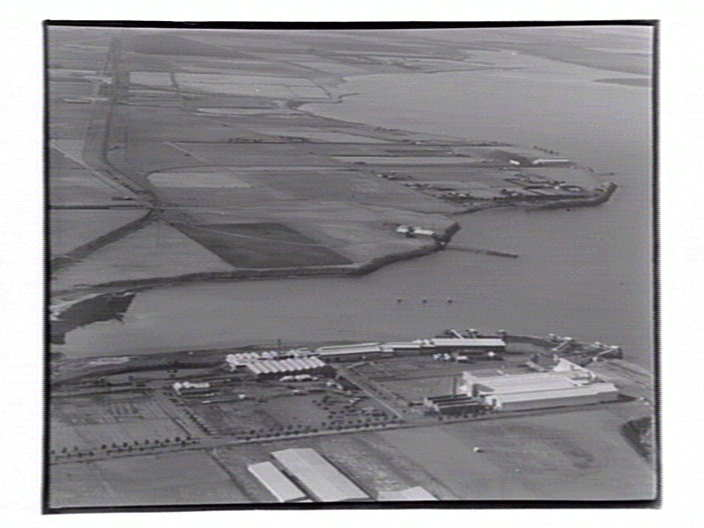
- North Shore in 1927. Corio Quay is in the foreground.
- Population: 357 (2016 census)
  - Density: 162/km^{2} (420/sq mi)
- Postcode(s): 3214
- Elevation: 16 m (52 ft)
- Area: 2.2 km^{2} (0.8 sq mi)
- Location: 7 km (4 mi) N of Geelong; 67 km (42 mi) WSW of Melbourne
- LGA(s): City of Greater Geelong
- State electorate(s): Lara
- Federal division(s): Corio
Suburbs around North Shore:
Corio	Corio	Corio Bay
Norlane	North Shore	Corio Bay
North Geelong	Corio Bay	Corio Bay

North Shore is an industrial and residential suburb of Geelong, Victoria, Australia. The suburb overlooks Corio Bay. A small residential area is east of the North Shore railway station with a few neighbourhood shops.

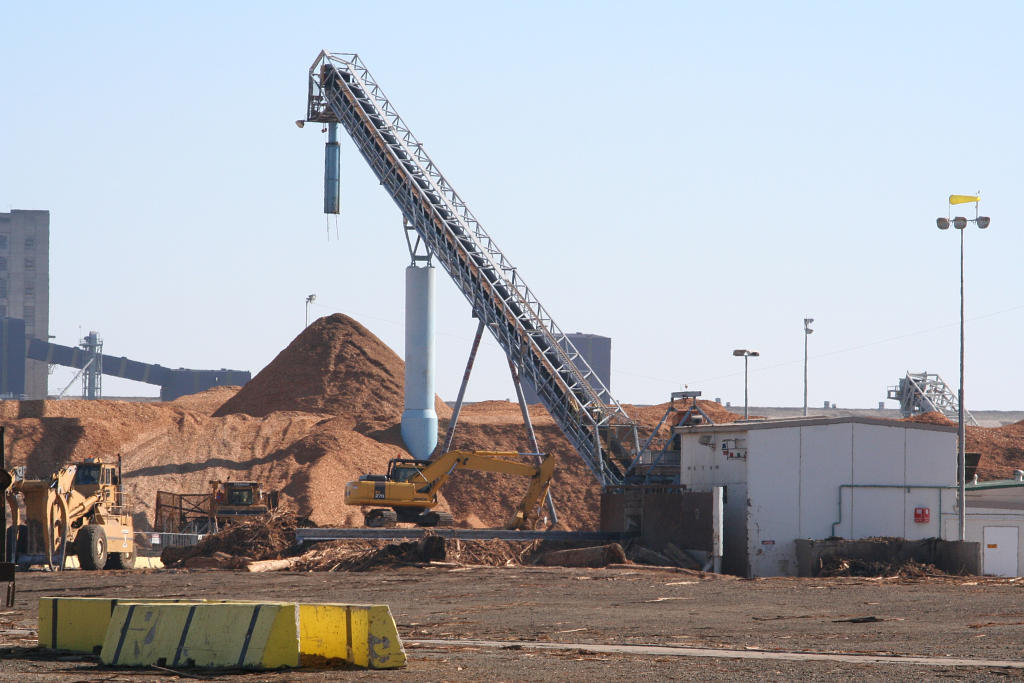
Midway Limited's Woodchipping Plant at North Shore

The suburb is bounded by the Melbourne to Warrnambool railway line to the west, St Georges Road to the north, Corio Bay to the east, and Cowies Creek to the south.

== History ==
The area was subdivided as a residential area and bayside retreat. An esplanade and linear park were laid out and planted with trees, the remaining fragment now being Moorpanyal Park. A small jetty was constructed and 10 years later North Shore was a small holiday resort.

The Post Office opened on 27 August 1898. It was known as Corio from 1908 until 1913, before reverting to North Shore.

Some references say a railway station was first opened at North Shore on 15 April 1895, but an 1857 map shows a station named Cowie's Creek where the current station is sited, which by the 1880s was called North Shore. In 1909, the station was briefly renamed Corio, reverting to North Shore in 1913. In the 1920s various other names, related to the industrial expansion in the area, were suggested for the station, including Jelbart, Pivot and Ford. In 1930, the Minister for Railways announced that the station's name would change to Pivot, but that never happened.

Industrialisation in the North Shore area commenced in 1899, when a meat freezing works was opened. The mouth of Cowies Creek was excavated to become Corio Quay from 1909, with the creation of Lascelles Wharf to the north in later years.

In 1925 the Ford factory and the Phosphate Co-Operative Company of Australia's "Pivot" phosphate works were opened, and in 1929 the Corio Distillery opened. International Harvester opened its plant near Ford in 1939.

During the 1920s there were several land subdivisions in the North Shore area. One of them was "Fordtown", no doubt trying to cash in on the coming of the Ford works, and the name was well enough accepted to appear on a 1923 Army Survey map. A small residential area gradually developed between the International Harvester plant and the Pivot works.

In the post-war years the Shell Oil Company refinery began production in 1956 at the northern end of North Shore. Other industries established at that time included Coca-Cola Bottlers, Pilkington Glass and Ryland Brothers (later BHP) wire and wire products factory.

The suburb has an Australian Rules football team competing in the Geelong Football League.

== Census populations ==
- 1921 - 124
- 1947 - 365
- 2021 - 325
