= Drumcondra =

Drumcondra is the name of several places:

- Drumcondra, Dublin, Ireland, a residential area on the Northside of Dublin
  - Drumcondra railway station
  - Drumcondra F.C., former football club
- Drumconrath, a village in County Meath, Ireland, alternatively known as Drumcondra
- Drumcondra, Victoria, Australia, a residential suburb of Geelong, overlooking Corio Bay
