= Geelong Saleyards =

Australian livestock exchange

The Geelong Saleyards is a livestock exchange located on Weddell road, North Geelong, Victoria, Australia. It operated as a livestock exchange until August 2017.

== History ==
The early Geelong Town Corporation bought land for the saleyards in 1867 and opened the facility on the 6 September 1869.

The Geelong Saleyards has significance as the most intact functioning 19th century municipal stock yards known in Victoria. They were the second municipal saleyards to be built in Geelong, to a layout and design by the Town Surveyor, Robert Balding.

== Closure ==
The Geelong Saleyards closed to the sale of sheep and cattle on 31 August 2017. Poultry sales closed on 30 July 2018.
