= Lovely Banks =

Lovely Banks Geelong, Victoria
- Coordinates: 38°04′S 144°20′E
- Population: 2,301 (2016 census)
- Postcode(s): 3213
- LGA(s): City of Greater Geelong
- State electorate(s): Lara
- Federal division(s): Corio
Suburbs around Lovely Banks:
Anakie	Anakie	Lara
Moorabool	Lovely Banks	Corio
Moorabool	Bell Post Hill	Norlane; Bell Park

Lovely Banks is a northern suburb of Geelong, Victoria, Australia. Once an agricultural and rural area, the suburb is quickly developing into a residential area adjoining the Geelong suburbs of Bell Park, Corio and Norlane. At the 2016 census Lovely Banks had a population of 2,301.

The origin of the name is thought to be descriptive of the area. The land to the west rises quite quickly from 30 to 100 metres above sea level. It provides an expansive view of Geelong and Corio Bay.

The Post Office, opened around 1902 named as Lovely Banks Reservoir, was renamed Lovely Banks around 1907 and closed in 1960.

Cowies Creek Rail Bridge No. 1, a bridge on the Geelong-Ballarat railway line between Lovely Banks and Bell Post Hill, is listed on the Victorian Heritage Register.

== Census populations ==
- 1911 - 94
- 1961 - 114

== Geelong (Western) Ring Road ==
During construction of the Geelong Ring Road By Pass Lovely Banks was semi-separated from its closest neighbourhoods Bell Park, Corio and Norlane with the closures of Purnell and Goldsworthy Roads, to accommodate the new freeway. Lovely Banks can be accessed via the new Anakie Road overpass which was constructed as part of the Geelong By Pass project.

== See also ==
- Chanel College
