= Bell Post Hill =

- Suburb
- Interactive map of Bell Post Hill
- Coordinates: 38.100°S 144.328°E
- Country: Australia
- State: Victoria
- City: Geelong
- LGA: City of Greater Geelong

Government
  - State electorate: Lara
  - Federal division: Corio

Population
  - Total: 4,919 (2016 census)
- Postcode: 3215
Suburbs around Bell Post Hill
Moorabool	Lovely Banks	Norlane
Batesford	Bell Post Hill	Bell Park
Batesford	Hamlyn Heights	Bell Park

Bell Post Hill is a residential suburb of Geelong, Victoria, Australia. At the 2016 census, Bell Post had a population of 4,919.

The origin of the suburb's name is thought to be from a lookout or warning bell on a post or forked tree situated on the hill overlooking Corio Bay and the Moorabool river known as Morongo estate.

== Schools in Bell Post Hill ==
- Kardinia International College (previously Morongo College)
- Covenant College (previously Geelong Christian School)
- Rollins Primary School

== Heritage listed sites ==
- 205 Ballarat Road and 5-61 Anakie Road, Morongo
- Geelong-Ballarat railway line, Cowies Creek Rail Bridge No. 1

== Sport ==
Geelong Rangers FC play soccer at Myers Reserve and compete in the Victorian State League Division 2.
