= Rippleside, Victoria =

Rippleside
- Suburb

- Interactive map of Rippleside
- Coordinates: 38.128°S 144.354°E
- Country: Australia
- State: Victoria
- City: Geelong
- LGA: City of Greater Geelong

Government
  - State electorate: Lara
  - Federal division: Corio

Population
  - Total: 875 (2016 census)
- Postcode: 3215
Suburbs around Rippleside
North Geelong	North Geelong	Corio Bay
North Geelong	Rippleside	Corio Bay
North Geelong	Drumcondra	Corio Bay

Rippleside (/rˈɪpəlsaɪd/) is a suburb of Geelong, Victoria, Australia. The suburb overlooks Corio Bay. At the 2016 census, Rippleside had a population of 875.

Rippleside adjoins Drumcondra, 2.5 kilometres (1.6 mi) north of Geelong City on Corio Bay. The locality covers the suburban area bounded by Corio Bay, East Victoria Street (the Western section is a part of North Geelong and separated by a pedestrian underpass), Melbourne Road and Rippleside Park.

Rippleside Park is a much sought-after location in Geelong; many of the properties located in the area represent the Victorian history that the area has experienced throughout its life. The area is known for its lucrative, and therefore expensive location.

For local residents, the suburb is within 2 kilometres (1.2 mi) of the North Geelong Railway Station and bus routes connected to Geelong City.

== History ==
Geelong's early settlers were attracted to the area which is now Rippleside because of its convenience, being close to the Melbourne-Geelong Road which runs to the west of Rippleside Park. By 1854, after Geelong settlers had purchased lands in the area, the Rippleside Hotel and local general store were opened. The Melbourne-Geelong railway, opened in 1857, also runs on the western boundary of the suburb, and the nearby North Geelong railway station, called West Geelong in its first couple of years, was opened in 1883.

The Post Office opened on 19 May 1986, replacing the nearby North Geelong office.

The Balmoral Quay development, previously known as Rippleside Quay, is under construction and will involve the construction of over 50 luxury townhouses, a marina, and a boardwalk connecting Rippleside Beach and St Helens Park. The development will cost an estimated $80 million.

In January 2018, the newly refurbished Rippleside beach, and the latest expansion of the Bay trail between Rippleside and St Helens beaches, was opened to the public.

== Rippleside Park ==
Rippleside Park is in the suburb of Rippleside and overlooks Corio Bay. It has a Vietnam War memorial, facing Melbourne Road.

The park is used for many Geelong events such as charity events and fun runs. The park and the adjoining beach are popular with local families and tourists because there are several picnic and barbecue areas. It previously had a community-funded wooden playground, but this was removed in 2024 and a new playground and toilet block are currently under construction.

Its large open area is popular with dog walkers and fitness groups. There is also a restaurant/café, as well as ample parking.

The adjoining beachfront is popular. Its footpath heads south towards Western Beach and Geelong's waterfront, and north to St Helens and Corio Quay.

The City Council maintains the park and its facilities.

== St Helens Park ==
Located off Holden Avenue, off side of Victoria Street, this park and beach is also popular with locals.

Its expansive fishing pier is popular with fisherman.

The park, like Rippleside also has a great view of Geelong's skyline and the surrounds. It also has a playground, some tables and toilet facilities.

The park was established initially as a memorial to fallen Australian soldiers in various World War Two conflicts including the Malayan Campaign, Borneo Campaign and Battle of Singapore.
