= Norlane =

Coordinates: 38°05′31″S 144°21′22″E

- Suburb
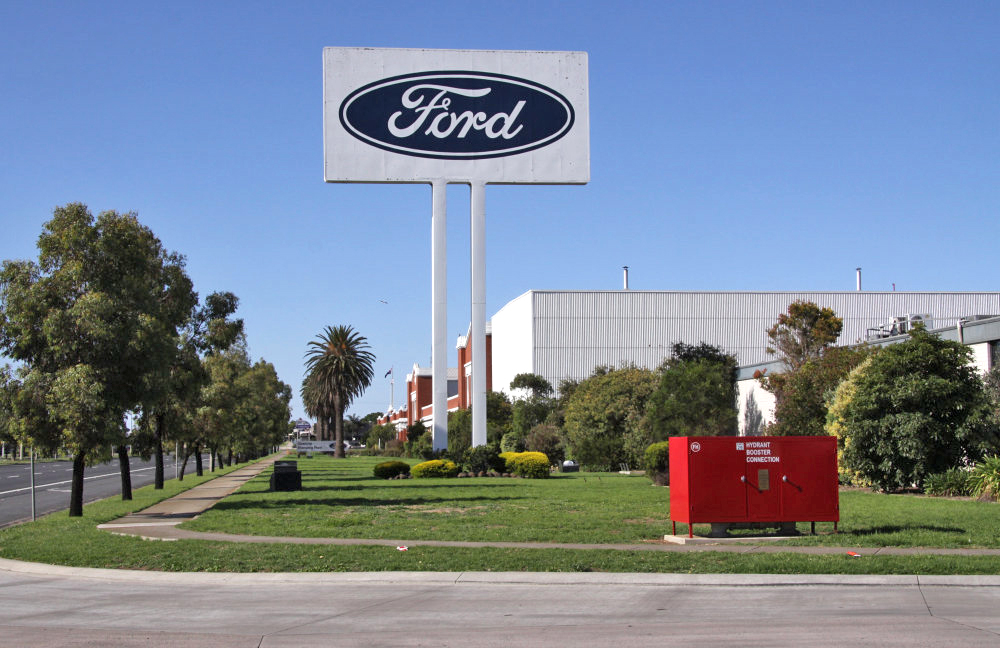
- Ford stamping plant on the Princes Highway, 2009
- Interactive map of Norlane
- Country: Australia
- State: Victoria
- City: Geelong
- LGA: City of Greater Geelong
- Location: 6 km (3.7 mi) N of Geelong; 68 km (42 mi) WSW of Melbourne

Government
  - State electorate: Lara
  - Federal division: Corio

Area
  - Total: 5.1 km^{2} (2.0 sq mi)
- Elevation: 22 m (72 ft)

Population
  - Total: 8,306 (2016 census)
  - Density: 1,629/km^{2} (4,220/sq mi)
- Postcode: 3214
Suburbs around Norlane
Lovely Banks	Corio	Corio
Lovely Banks	Norlane	North Shore
Bell Post Hill	Bell Park	North Geelong

Norlane is a northern suburb of Geelong, in Victoria, Australia. Norlane is bordered in the south by Cowies Creek, in the north by Cox Road, in the west by Thompson Road and in the east by Station Street. It is about 7 km from the Geelong central business district and approximately 70 km from the state capital, Melbourne. It is about one kilometre from the shore of Corio Bay. At the 2016 census, Norlane had a population of 8,306.

== History ==
The suburb of Norlane was named after Norman Lane, a local serviceman from the district, who died working on the Thai-Burma Railway in 1943, after being captured in Singapore.

Norlane post office opened on 17 December 1945 as development of the suburb began. Norlane West post office opened on 13 October 1958.

With the enormous demand for housing in the early 1950s, people resorted to living in small dwellings, tents and partially-completed buildings. The Housing Commission of Victoria provided accommodation for families unable to rent or to afford the purchase of their own home.

In 1947 the government Housing Commission began its house-building program in Norlane, and when its program was completed in 1976, there were 2,464 Commission houses available for low-income renters. Much of the housing was for employees at the nearby Ford Motor Company, International Harvester, Shell, Pilkington Glass, Henderson's Springs and Pivot Phosphate factories.

Workers seeking employment (among them wartime migrants building new lives) flocked to Geelong to take up jobs, and the Victorian Government responded through its Housing Commission, by buying up broad acres north of the Ford plant and building homes by the hundreds. A number of the houses built in Norlane were prefabricated units imported from the Netherlands and France. In a decade, Norlane was transformed from paddocks to busy working class suburbia. By 1960, the urban landscape of streets, roads, crescents, courts and boulevards seen today had extended as far as Corio Village. For Geelong, it was an exciting time.

The suburb contains one site listed on the Victorian Heritage Register, the Ford Motor Company Complex on the Princes Highway (Melbourne Road).

== Demographics ==
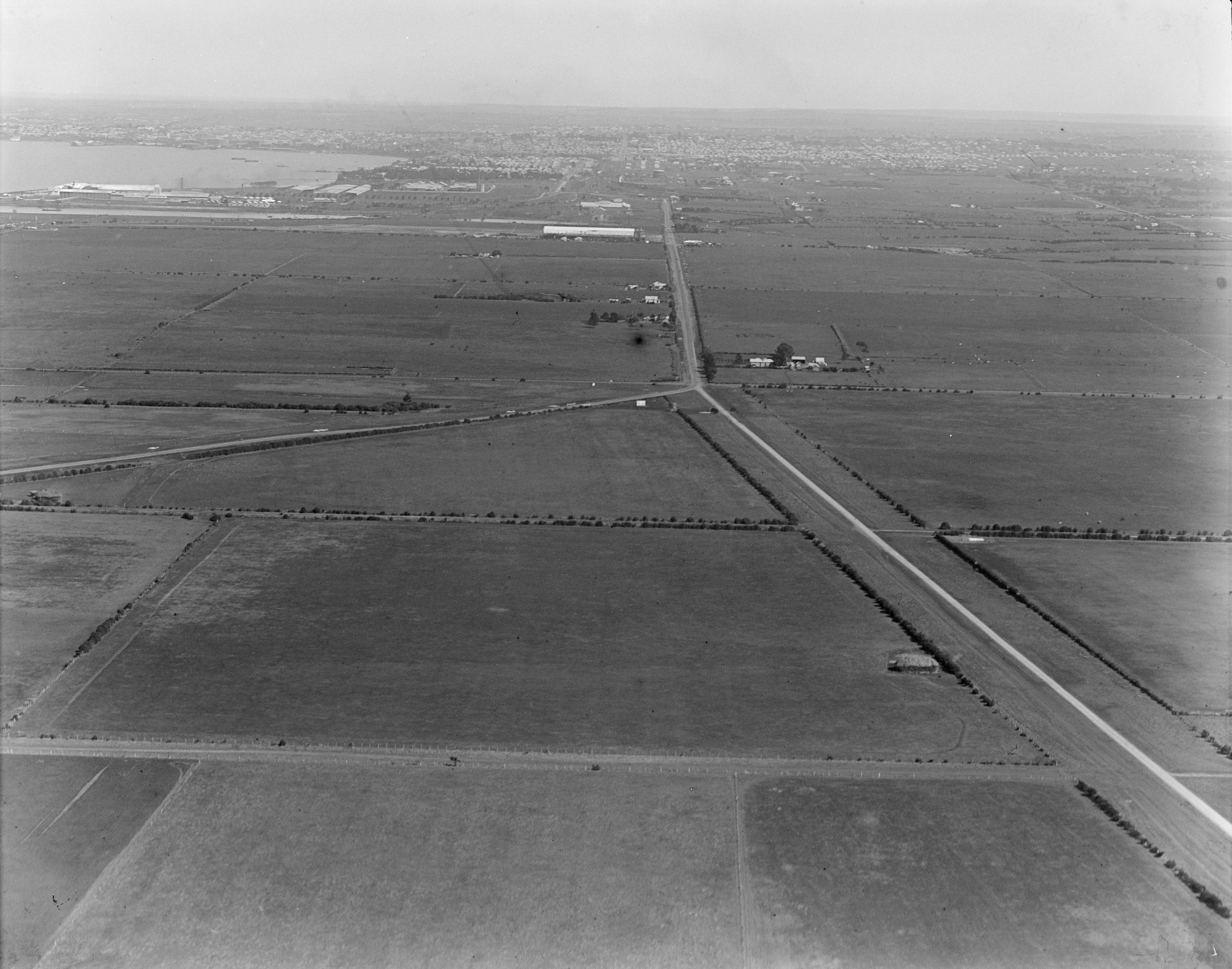
A 1925 view of the area that became Norlane.

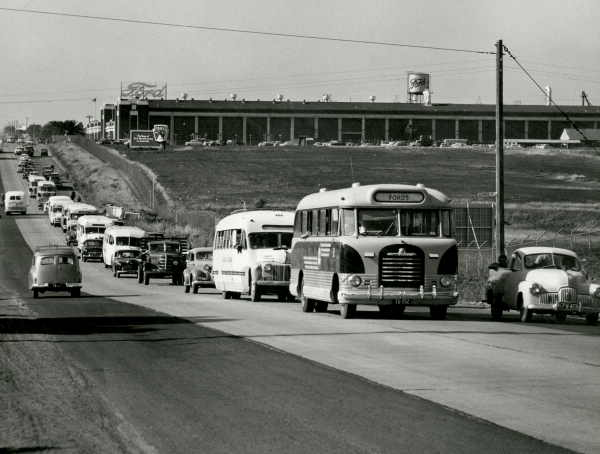
The Princes Highway (Melbourne Road), near Cowies Creek, in 1957. The Ford Motor Company factory is visible in the background.

In the 2001 Australian Bureau of Statistics Census of Population and Housing, the population of the Norlane census area was 8,628 people, in an area of 5.1 square kilometres. Females outnumbered males, with 4,436 females and 4,192 males as of 2001. Some 24% of the population of Norlane were born outside of Australia. The predominant age group in Norlane is 40 – 49 years.

The three most common forms of dwelling were (in decreasing order): a separate house, a flat or apartment, and a semi-detached house. Residents enjoy generous land parcels, ample backyards with single story weatherboard housing built during the 1960s on 600 to 800 square metres blocks, progressively brick based sud-division buildings and double story dwellings on approximately 300 square metre lots are beginning to become more common, with higher rise especially where views of the peninsula from a higher rise viewpoint are applicable. In August 2010 the median sale price of houses in the area is $184,500 up 15% from the previous year but generally raising by a modest 10% per year on average. 2002 saw a 38.9% growth in real estate value. Given the socio-economic status of the suburb, there is a high demand for rental accommodation in Norlane, with an expected rental return of $180 to $220 per week for a three-bedroom house. In 2018 saw a median 3 bedroom house price rise to approximately $350,000 with 2017-2018 period jumping over 20%. Rental yield is approximately 4% depending on quality of the property. Two bedroom unit saw a jump to $283,000 with rental yield of just over 5%.

A majority of residents of are employed (in decreasing order) in engineering (6.83%), management and commerce (2.2%) and food, hospitality and personal services industries (1.5%).

Norlane has several churches. In 2001, the five strongest religious affiliations in the area were (in descending order): Catholic, Anglican, Orthodox, Presbyterian and Uniting. Norlane is also home to the Hungarian Seventh-day Adventist Church.

== Facilities ==
Affordable housing close to shopping, transport and Geelong's largest employers make Norlane a popular suburb. Norlane's Waterworld boasts 2 25m indoor heated swimming pools, spa, gymnasium, two water slides, diving pool, outdoor children's pools and a splash-pad.. Labuan Square shopping centre opened in 1954. but has since been largely superseded by the Corio Shopping Centre. Labuan Square, and other smaller shopping precincts around Norlane provide residents convenience within walking distance.

There are three nearby boat ramps: Corio Bay Boat Club, Grammar School Lagoon Boat Ramp and St Helens Boat Ramp. There are seven parks covering nearly 9% of the total area, with ovals and facilities for skating and ball games.

== Schools ==
A number of primary schools opened in Norlane between 1955 and 1962, and Norlane High School in 1959. Norlane Primary School in Thrush Street closed in 2004 and became a private Islamic college - Isik College. That closed several years later and the buildings were demolished in 2013. Norlane High School closed in 2012 and was demolished two years later. Primary and secondary students are now catered for by Northern Bay P-12 College, a multi-campus college which was founded in 2011 as a result of a merger of nine former state school (Corio West PS, Norlane High School, Flinders Peak SC, Corio South PS, Norlane West PS, Corio Bay PS, North Shore PS, Rosewall PS, and Corio PS). Other schools include St Thomas Aquinas Primary School and Geelong Kindergarten Association.

== Transport ==
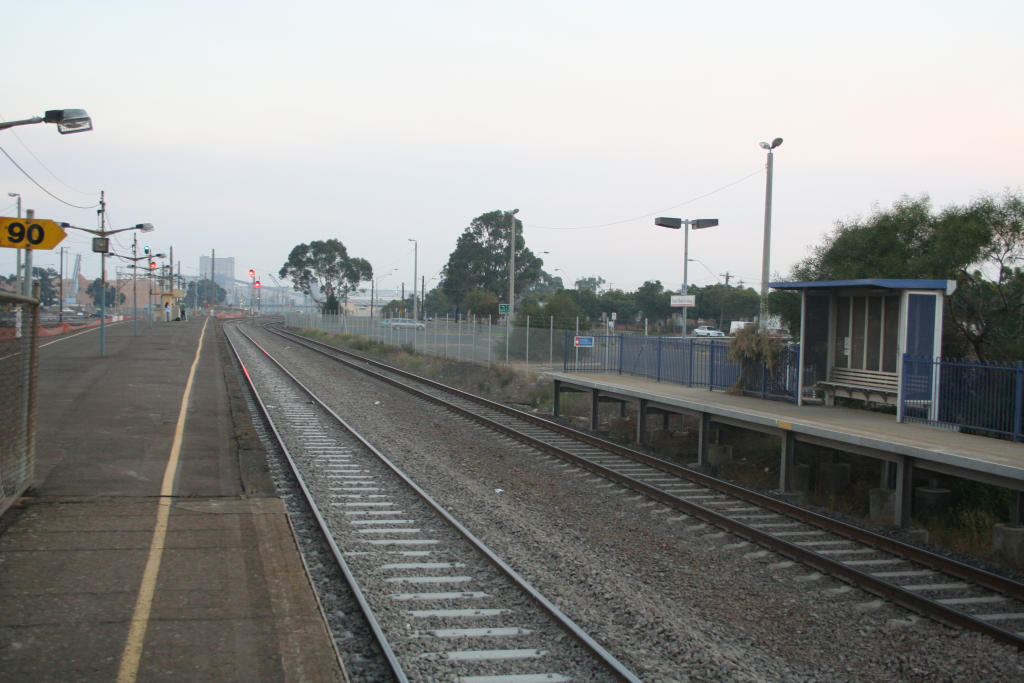
North Shore railway station, in Station Street, provides frequent rail services from Norlane to both Melbourne and Geelong.

Cars are the most-used method of transport in Norlane, followed by walking and bicycles. The Princes Highway, or Melbourne Road, the main arterial between Melbourne and Geelong, runs through the centre of the suburb, and the Geelong-Bacchus Marsh Road provides access to central Victoria.

North Shore railway station is located at the south-east corner of Norlane, in Station Street, with V/Line trains providing frequent services on the Geelong line to both Melbourne and Geelong.

== Census populations ==
- 1947 – 347
- 1971 – 12,098
- 2001 - 8,616
- 2001 - 8,945 Norlane and North Shore combined
- 2006 - 7,935
- 2006 - 8,254 Norlane and North Shore combined

== Norlane photo gallery ==
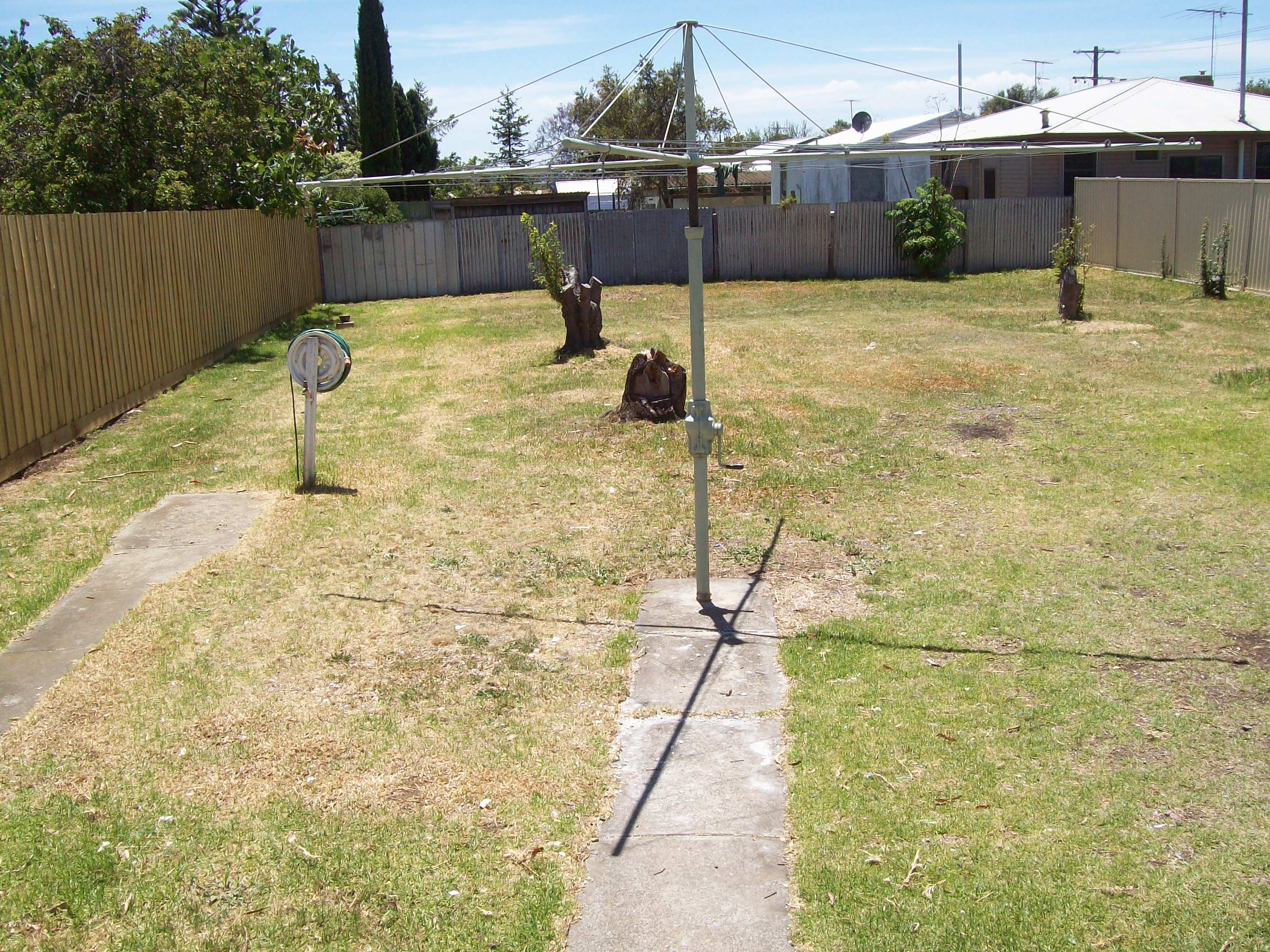
The back yard of a typical 750m² lot

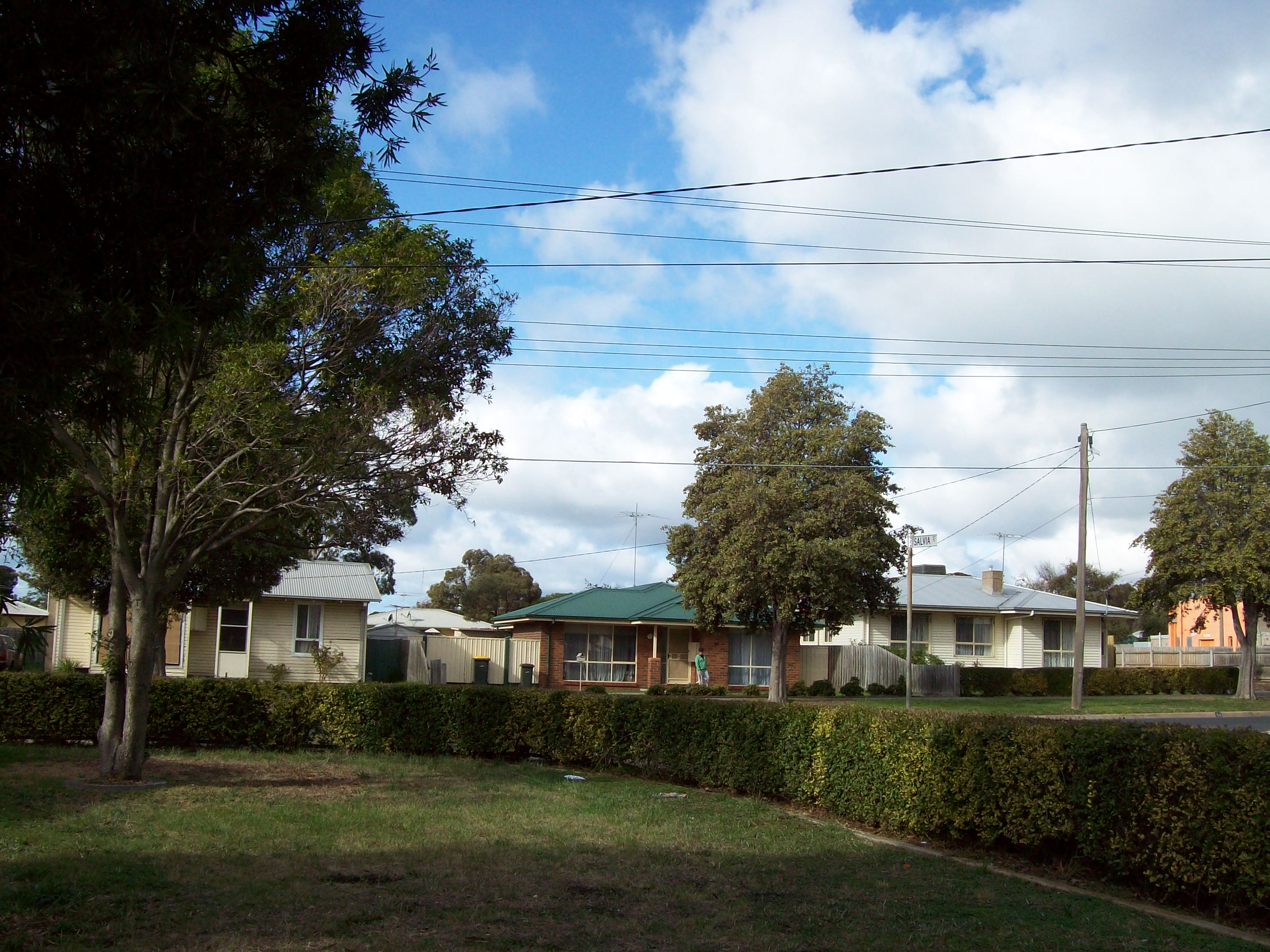
A typical front yard and street-scape

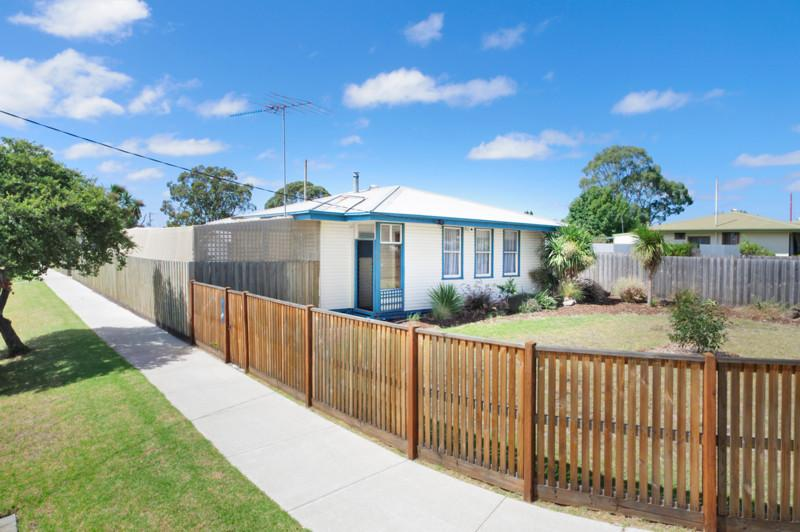
A typical 3-bedroom house in Norlane

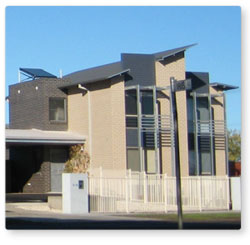
New-style public housing
