= Kathleen Halloran =

Australian singer songwriter and guitarist

- Occupations: Singer; songwriter
- Instruments: Vocals; guitar
- Years active: 2024–present
- Website: www.kathleenhalloran.com

Kathleen Halloran is an Australian singer and songwriter and guitarist from Melbourne, Victoria. Halloran is a guitarist for Kate Ceberano and has performed with Felix Riebl, Iva Davies, William Barton, Jade MacRae, Jimi Hocking and Darren Middleton.

Halloran released her debut studio album Nobody’s Baby on 8 May 2026, which debuted at 26 on the ARIA Albums Charts.

== Early life ==
Kathleen is the youngest of nine children. Halloran attended Clonard College from 2008-2013.

== Career ==
=== 2024-present ===
In November 2024, Halloran released her debut single "Free with Me".

Halloran's debut studio album Nobody’s Baby was released in May 2026. It debuted at number 26 on the ARIA Albums Charts.

== Discography ==
=== Studio albums ===
Title	Details	Peak chart positions
Title	Details	AUS
Nobody’s Baby	Released: 8 May 2026; Label: Kathleen Halloran (KHNB001); Formats: CD, LP, digital download	26
