= Clonard College =

Location
- Herne Hill, Geelong West, Victoria; Australia; 38°7′48″S 144°19′48″E

Information
- Type: Independent secondary day school
- Motto: Latin: Fortiter et Suaviter (Strength and Kindliness)
- Religious affiliation: Kildare Ministries
- Denomination: Roman Catholic
- Established: 1956; 70 years ago
- Principal: Luci Quinn
- Gender: Girls
- Enrolment: c. 900
- Campus type: Regional
- Colours: Maroon, green and white
- Website: clonard.catholic.edu.au

Clonard College is an independent Roman Catholic secondary day school for girls, located in Herne Hill, a suburb of Geelong, in Victoria, Australia. Founded and owned by the Brigidine Sisters in 1956, Clonard College follows the traditions of the Brigidine order and Kildare Ministries.

== Overview ==
Clonard School was established in 1956, when the Brigidine Sisters acquired the Clonard property at the invitation of Father John Tresidder, the Manifold Parish Priest. The school was named "Clonard" to honor the association between Saint Brigid and Saint Finnian of Clonard in fifth-century Ireland. The founding sisters, including Sister Lelia Grant, began classes with 40 students in its initial year. Clonard College was officially opened on 9 February 1958.

In 1977, the assembly hall and library were constructed with partial funding from the first Federal grant. In 1983, John Shannon became the first full-time lay Principal. Later, in the late 1990s, Clonard's leadership adopted a Co-Principalship model with Vicki Myers, a former Clonard student, joining Michael Doyle in the Co-Principal positions.

The late 1990s and early part of the 21st century saw revitalised enrolment growth, accommodated by expansive building programs, delivering a theatre, design education centre, materials technology room, expanded office space, refurbished science facilities, a gymnasium and multi purpose court within the school grounds.

In 2006, Clonard celebrated its 50th anniversary with a range of functions involving past students and key founders. The year of celebration reached its peak with the anniversary dinner at Kardinia Park and concluded with the 2006 Celebration of "Achievement Evening" at Costa Hall, whose theme reflected 50 years of achievement in the name of Clonard.

In physical terms, the college's expansion and development continued with the opening of the newly built two-storey Year 12 Center, containing a number of modern and flexible learning areas and office spaces on its upper floor and the large "Independent Learning Centre", beneath, dedicated to serving the particular personal and academic needs of the college's Year 12 girls.

Early in 2008, the year 7 rooms along Church Street were demolished to allow construction of a modern, two-storey Year 7 Centre, equipped with a range of sustainability technologies. The Year 7 Learning Centre was officially opened on 24 April 2009.

In November 2012, it was announced that Clonard College had purchased "Minerva", a former campus of Western Heights College. In 2013, Clonard embarked on a major building project with the construction of a new Yr. 8 & 9 Centre, along with the demolition and refurbishment of the Minerva road campus. In September 2018, a multipurpose building along the Church Street entrance was completed and opened to students, mainly consisting of a library and counselling services.

== House system ==
Clonard has a house system consisting of four houses:

Name	Colour(s)	Name origin
Finian	White and Blue	Named after St. Finian of Clonard.
Kildare	Green	Named after County Kildare in Ireland, where St. Brigid lived.
Lelia	Red	Named after Sister Lelia Grant, one of the school's founding nuns.
Xavier	Yellow	Named after St. Francis Xavier.

== See also ==
- List of non-government schools in Victoria
- List of schools in Geelong
