= Hamlyn Heights =

Hamlyn Heights Geelong, Victoria
- Golden ash trees on Langibanool avenue Hamlyn Heights, Victoria, Australia

- Coordinates: 38.122°S 144.323°E
- Population: 6,293 (2016 census)
- Postcode(s): 3215
- Location: 4 km (2 mi) from Geelong
- LGA(s): City of Greater Geelong
- State electorate(s): Geelong
- Federal division(s): Corio
Suburbs around Hamlyn Heights:
Bell Post Hill	Bell Park	North Geelong
Fyansford	Hamlyn Heights	Geelong West
Fyansford	Herne Hill	Manifold Heights

Hamlyn Heights is a residential suburb of Geelong. It located to the west of the city on hills that overlook Corio Bay.

It was named after Sidney Hamlyn, a local resident in the 1940s.

At the 2016 census, Hamlyn Heights had a population of 6,293.

The suburb boundaries are Church St, Ballarat Rd, Moorabool River and two unmarked boundaries extending between Church St to Moorabool River and between Moorabool River and Ballarat Rd.

Hamlyn Heights has two retail areas. A large shopping strip is located in Vines Rd. The Post Office opened here on 2 February 1959 it is known as Vines Road, Geelong. A small group of shops also exist in Fairlie St.

Hamlyn Heights was the home to international actor Guy Pearce who lived in Hamlyn Heights during the 1990s.

== Education ==
Hamlyn Heights has two primary schools, Herne Hill Primary School & Hamlyn Banks Primary School (created in the late 1990s by a merger between Hamlyn Heights Primary School and Lovely Banks Primary School).

Hamlyn Heights has one secondary school: Western Heights Secondary College.

In 2018 Hamlyn Views primary/secondary school (for young people with special needs) opened on the former site of Bell Park High School (Western Heights Secondary College Quamby Campus) in Quamby Avenue.

== Sports and recreation ==
Hamlyn Park is home to the Hamlyn Park Tennis Club, Geelong Ballroom Dance Club, 1st Hamlyn Heights Scout Group and the Bell Park Sport and Recreation Club which has teams in the local football and netball associations.

Hamlyn Park was developed by the Shire of Corio and the Geelong Scottish club out of waste ground and scrub as a multi-sport facility with soccer as the first activity.

== Heritage listed sites ==
The prefabricated 4 room weatherboard clad cottage at 21 Brewongle Avenue Hamlyn Heights is one of a number of portable buildings imported to Geelong in the period 1853–1856 to meet accommodation needs during the Victorian gold rush.

- 21 Brewongle Avenue
- 'Glenpanyal' - 22 Glengate Street
