= Port of Geelong =

Port in Victoria, Australia

Geelong Port
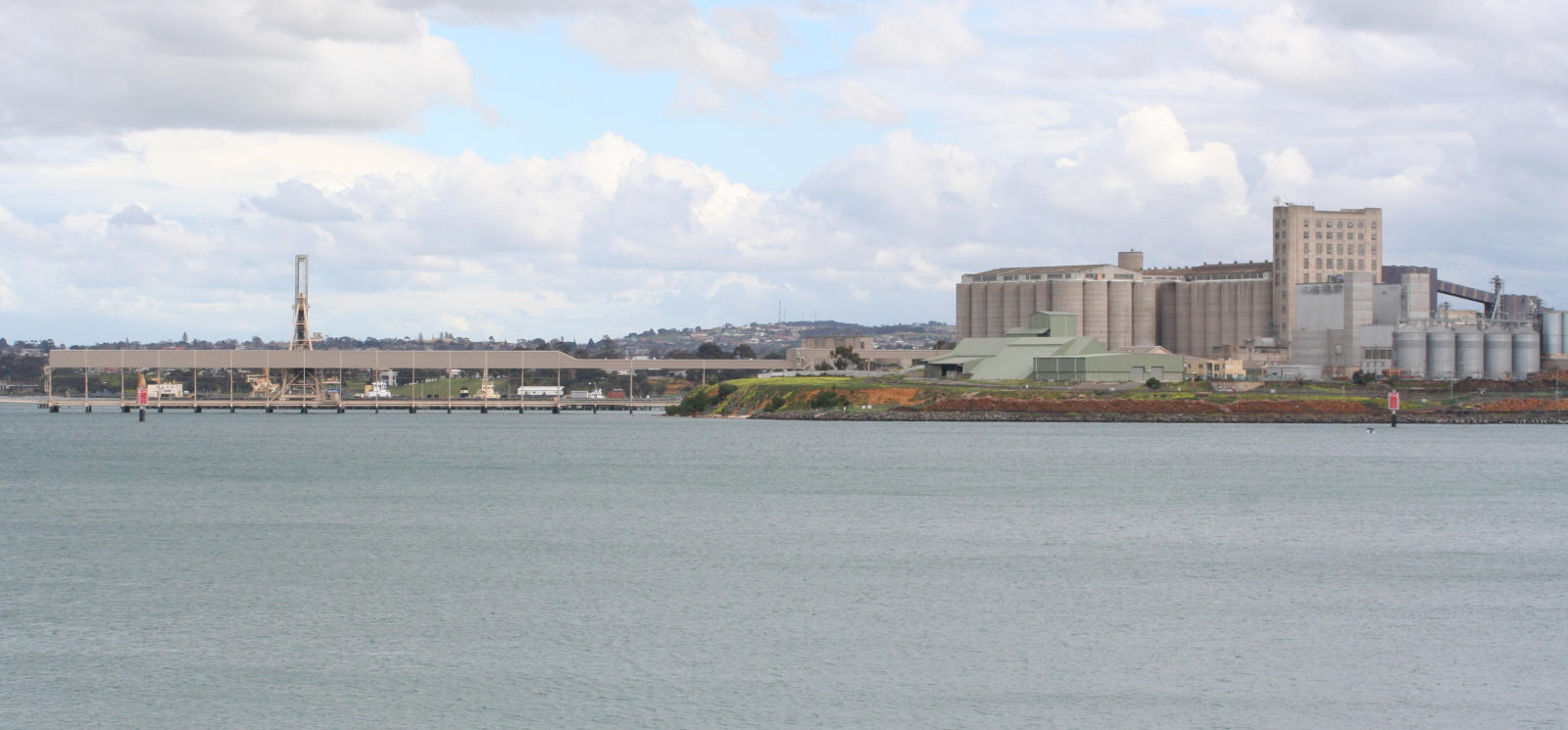
- The Bulk Grain Pier and grain elevator at North Geelong
- Interactive map of Geelong Port
- Location within Australia

Location
- Country: Australia
- Location: Geelong
- Coordinates: 38°7′S 144°23′E
- UN/LOCODE: AUGEX

Details
- Owned by: Stonepeak; Spirit Super
- Type of Harbor: Artificial
- No. of berths: 15
- Draft depth: 11.9 m.
- CEO: Brett Winter

Statistics
- Website www.geelongport.com.au

The Port of Geelong is located on the shores of Corio Bay at Geelong, Victoria, Australia. The port is the sixth-largest in Australia by tonnage.

Major commodities handled by the port include crude oil and petroleum products, export grain and woodchips, alumina imports, and fertiliser. Major port industries include Graincorp's grain elevator and Viva Energy's Geelong Oil Refinery.

The Port of Geelong handled $5.6 billion worth of bulk cargo in 2004–05, made up of 12 million tonnes of cargo from 543 ship visits.

== History ==
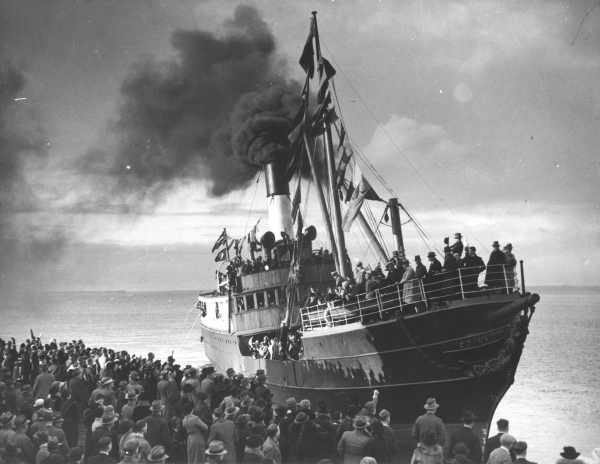
The steamboat Edina leaving Geelong on its final journey on 21 June 1938.

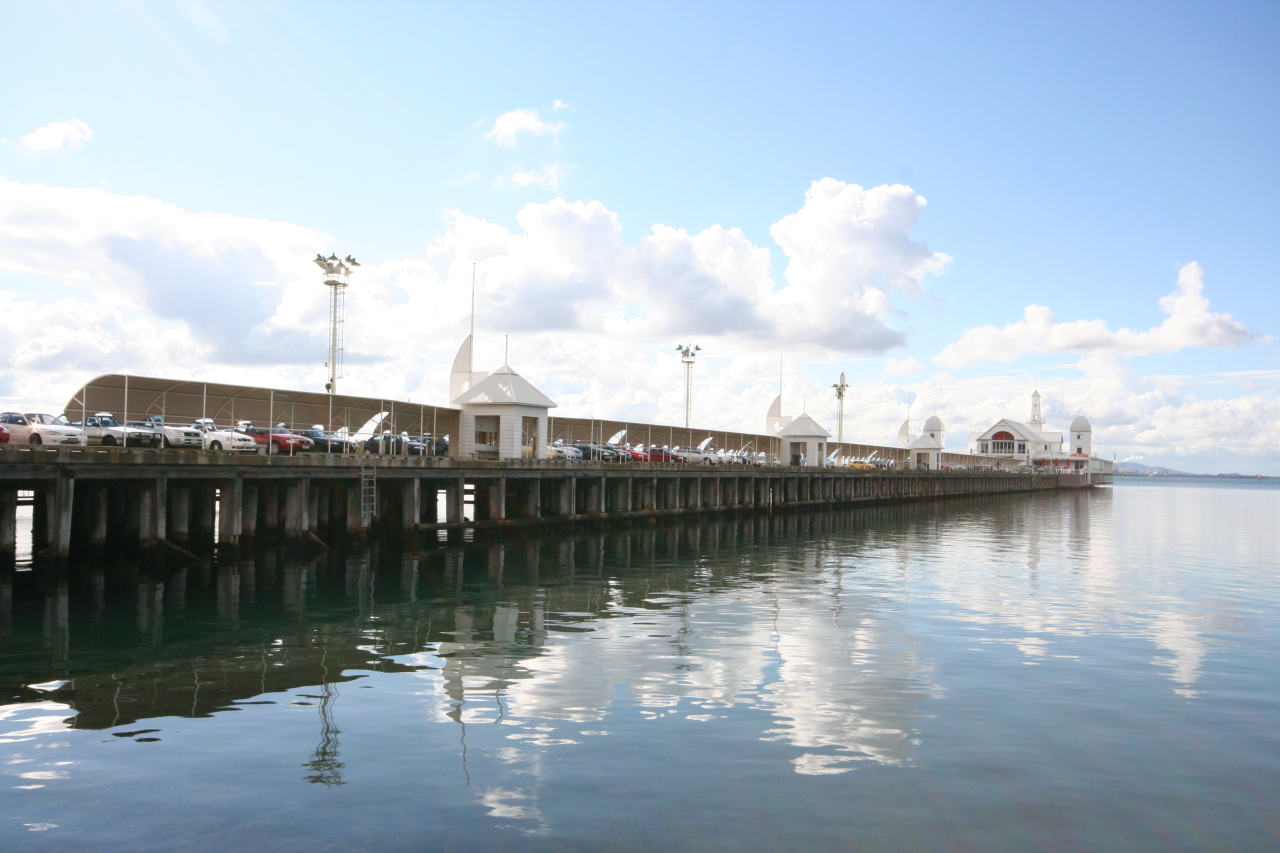
Cunningham Pier has been refurbished for tourists.

Before the initial settlement of Geelong, a sandbar across the bay from Point Lillias to Point Henry only allowed small ships to enter the inner harbour. Larger ships were required to drop anchor in the bay, and their cargo was brought into Geelong on lighters. At times it was possible to walk across the bay on the sandbar at low tide.

The first channel through the sandbar was started in 1853, providing less than 4 metres draught for ships. This channel was straightened out and dredged at a depth of 6 metres in the 1860s. In 1881 dredging of a new channel was started which took 12 years to complete. It was named the Hopetoun Channel after the then Governor of Victoria, Lord Hopetoun, who opened it on 20 December 1893.

By the early twentieth century shipping traffic had increased and the existing piers in the city area were proving inadequate. As a result, new port facilities were progressively provided in the North Geelong area.

== Management ==
Management of the channels and port of Geelong was the responsibility of the Geelong Harbor Trust that was formed in December 1905. In addition, the Authority was responsible for the associated ports at Queenscliff, Barwon Heads, Lorne and Apollo Bay.

In 1981, the trust was reconstituted as the Port of Geelong Authority as an attempt to follow modern practice with the naming of organisations responsible for ports operation throughout the world. The authority was privatised by the State Government, being sold to Ports Pty Ltd for $49.6 million on 1 July 1996. Ports Pty Ltd was a joint venture between Primera, a wholly owned subsidiary of TNT (30%) and Infrastructure Investment Corporation (70%). The port was later rebranded as Toll GeelongPort after the acquisition of TNT by Toll Holdings. The port is now branded as GeelongPort, and is a joint venture owned 50% by State Super and 50% by Brookfield’s Linx Cargo Care Group, following the sale of the Asciano group of companies in August 2016 (Asciano formed from the demerger of Toll Holdings in 2007).

In 2008 the Australian Competition & Consumer Commission (ACCC) revoked Asciano's exclusive equipment contract with the Port of Geelong. The ACCC found that the compulsory use of Asciano cranes for dry bulk and fertiliser unloading was anti-competitive, and that the negative effects of the arrangement outweighed any productivity improvements derived from use of a single equipment type.

== Facilities ==
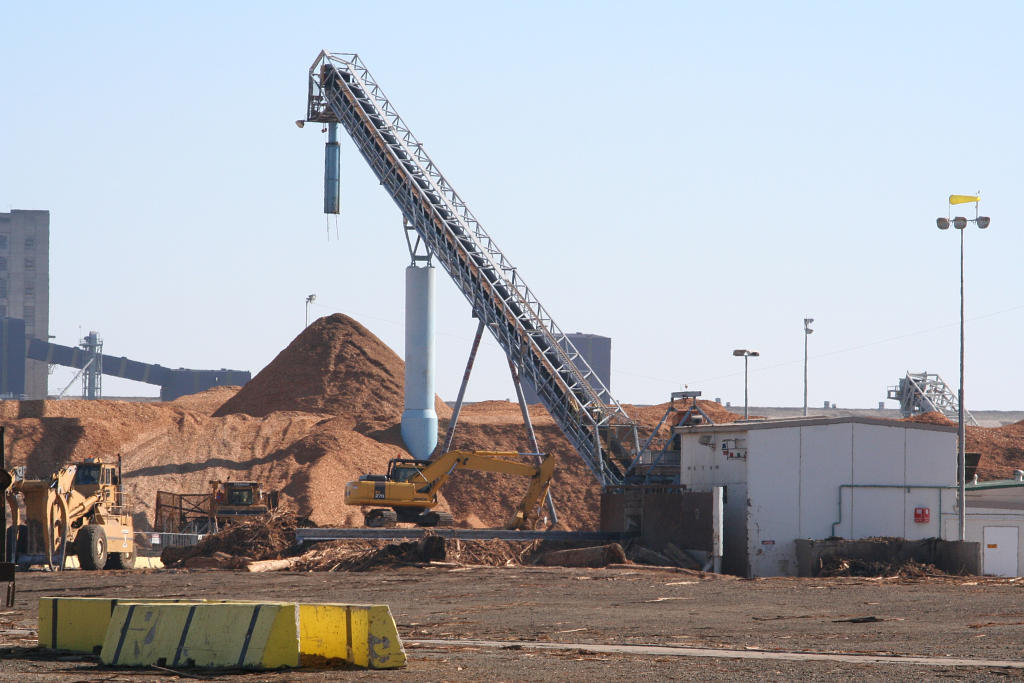
Woodchipping plant at North Shore

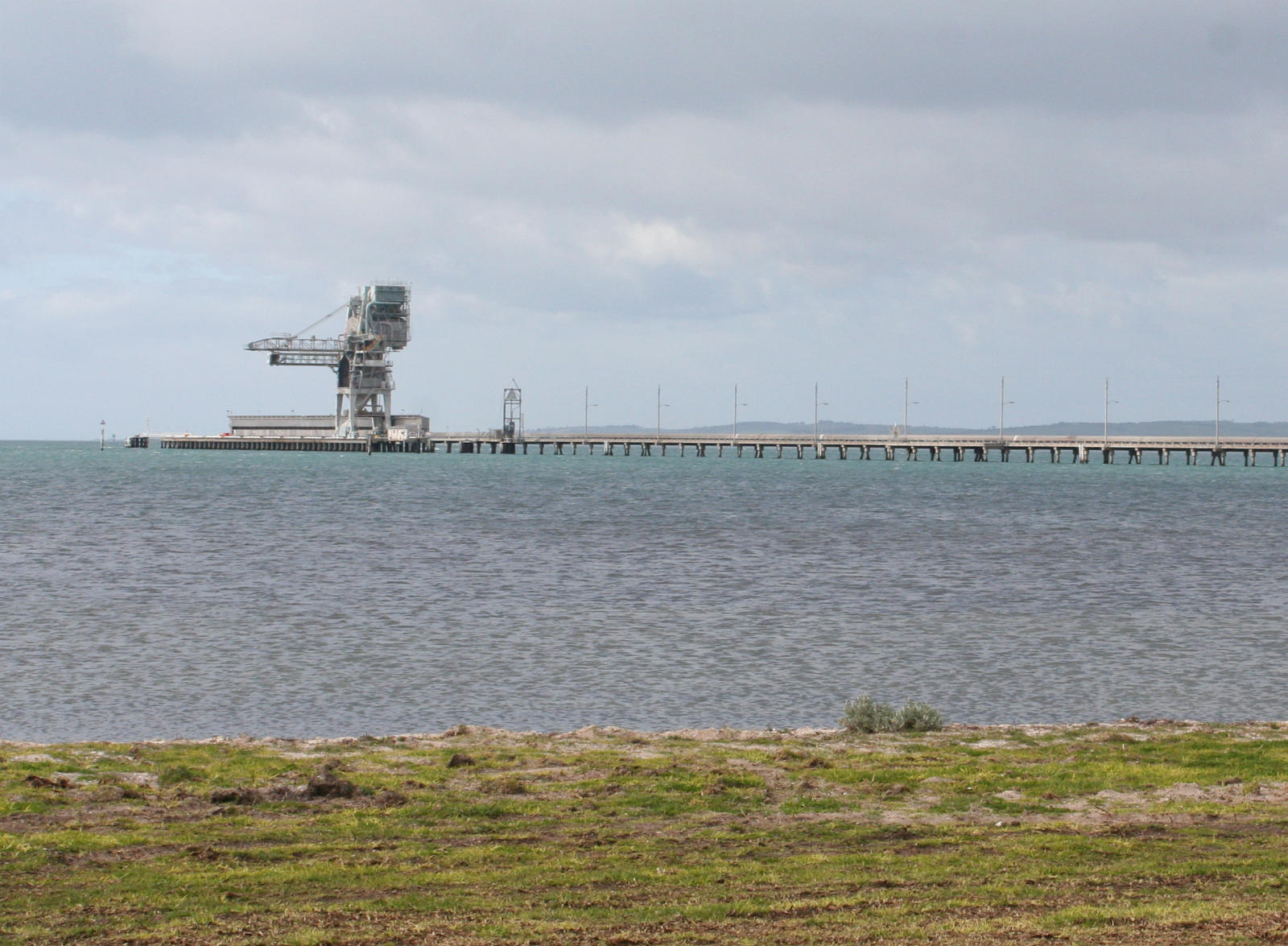
The wharf and unloader at Point Henry

Major piers in the Port of Geelong include:

- Cunningham Pier: opened as the Railway Pier in the mid-1850s, the pier was rebuilt in the late 1920s and renamed Cunningham Pier in 1929. Disused by the 1980s, it was later occupied by a Smorgy's restaurant. Currently used as a restaurant and social venue called 'The Pier'.
- Moorabool Street Wharf: located at the end of the street of the same name. Main terminal for bay steamers until the last one ceased running in 1942. Demolished in the 1950s.
- Yarra Street Pier. Destroyed by fire in 1988 and mostly removed, but has been the subject of a number of rebuilding proposals since.

By the early 1900s, shipping traffic has increased and the existing piers in the city area were inadequate. As a result, new port developments were started in the North Geelong area.

- Corio Quay. Construction started in the 1900s, and the wharfs are still in use today for woodchip and bulk cargoes. As of 22 October 2022 Corio Quay will be the Victorian port for the Spirit of Tasmania.
- Grain Pier. Built to export grain from the adjacent grain elevators in 1937. Replaced by a newer pier to the north in the 1990s.
- Lascelles Wharf. Caters for general cargo, as well as minerals and fertiliser for the adjacent phosphate works.
- Refinery Pier. Opened by Shell in 1953 to cater for their nearby Geelong Oil Refinery.

There are also a number of special purpose piers on Corio Bay:

- Point Henry Pier. Established by Alcoa at Point Henry for alumina ore imports for their former Point Henry smelter
- Point Wilson Pier. Established for the import of explosives that were then stored at the adjacent reserve.

== Cruise ship visits ==
In addition to visits by the Spirit of Tasmania, Geelong also serves as a stop for cruise visits.

== See also ==
- List of ports in Australia
