= Adam Deller =

Australian astrophysicist

- Born: Geelong, Victoria, Australia
- Education: Swinburne University of Technology
- Known for: Very Long Baseline Interferometry, DiFX software correlator, Fast Radio Bursts
- Scientific career
- Fields: Astrophysics, Radio astronomy
- Workplaces: Swinburne University of Technology, National Radio Astronomy Observatory, ASTRON
- Doctoral advisor: Steven Tingay

Adam Deller is an Australian astrophysicist and educator.

He is a Professor of Astrophysics at the Centre for Astrophysics and Supercomputing at Swinburne University of Technology.

Deller is best known for his research into compact objects, including neutron stars and black holes, and for developing the DiFX software correlator, a tool widely adopted in radio astronomy. In 2020, he was awarded the Pawsey Medal by the Australian Academy of Science.

== Early life and education ==
Deller grew up in Geelong, Victoria, attending Western Heights College, where he graduated as school Dux in 1999. He pursued his undergraduate studies at Swinburne University of Technology, completing a dual Bachelor of Engineering in electronic and computer systems with first-class honours.

He shifted focus to astronomy during his postgraduate studies, earning a PhD in astrophysics from Swinburne University in 2008. His doctoral thesis, titled Precision VLBI astrometry: Instrumentation, algorithms and pulsar parallax determination, laid the groundwork for high-throughput software processing of data gathered from radio telescope arrays.

== Career and research ==
Following his PhD, Deller worked as a postdoctoral researcher at the National Radio Astronomy Observatory (NRAO) in the United States and later held a research position at ASTRON, the Netherlands Institute for Radio Astronomy. He returned to Australia to join the faculty at Swinburne University of Technology, where he serves as an Australian Research Council Future Fellow and an Associate Investigator for the Centre of Excellence for Gravitational Wave Research (OzGrav).

Deller's primary research focuses on high-resolution radio astronomy, specifically using Very Long Baseline Interferometry (VLBI) to measure the precise distances and movements of pulsars, neutron stars, and black holes. His observational work has contributed significantly to tracing the local environments and origin points of Fast Radio Bursts (FRBs).

In addition to observational astronomy, Deller is the originator and primary coordinator of DiFX (Distributed FX ), an open-source, software-based correlator. Developed during his doctoral studies, DiFX allows standard computer clusters to process data collected by geographically separated radio telescopes, replacing expensive, custom-built hardware architectures. The software has become the de facto standard infrastructure tool utilised by major observatories globally, including the Australian Long Baseline Array, the Very Long Baseline Array (USA), and the Event Horizon Telescope network.

== Awards and recognition ==
- 2010: Awarded the Charlene Heisler Prize by the Astronomical Society of Australia for the best astronomy PhD thesis.
- 2018: Received the Vice-Chancellor's Research Excellence Award at Swinburne University.
- 2019: Awarded the Peter McGregor Prize by the Astronomical Society of Australia as part of the DiFX collaboration.
- 2020: Awarded the Pawsey Medal by the Australian Academy of Science for outstanding early-career research in physics.
