= Nathan Herbert =

Australian basketball player (born 1984)

No. 11 – Geelong Supercats
- Position: Guard
- League: SEABL

Personal information
- Born: 26 October 1984 (age 42) Geelong, Victoria, Australia
- Listed height: 193 cm (6 ft 4 in)

Career information
- High school: Western Heights College (Geelong, Victoria)
- Playing career: 2002–present

Career history
- 2002–2011: Geelong Supercats
- 2007–2009: South Dragons
- 2009–2012: Adelaide 36ers
- 2013–present: Geelong Supercats

Career highlights
- NBL champion (2009); SEABL champion (2010); ABA champion (2006)

Nathan Herbert (born 26 October 1984) is an Australian basketball player for the Geelong Supercats of the South East Australian Basketball League (SEABL). A 350-game player with the Supercats, Herbert is a two-time national champion, having won titles with Geelong in 2006 and 2010. Herbert spent five years in the National Basketball League (NBL), winning a championship in 2009 with the South Dragons.

== SEABL career ==
Herbert joined the Geelong Supercats for the first time in 2002. He won conference championships with the Supercats in 2005, 2006, 2007 and 2010, including winning national championships in 2006 and 2010. Herbert played for the Supercats every year between 2002 and 2011, before taking a year off in 2012 to travel around Europe with his wife Sally. He returned to the Supercats for the 2013 season, and in 2014, he was named co-captain. Herbert had previously relinquished the co-captaincy prior to the 2012 season after undergoing knee surgery.

In April 2015, Herbert played his 300th SEABL game. In May 2017, he played his 350th SEABL game.

On 29 July 2018, Herbert announced that he would be retiring from the SEABL at the end of the 2018 season.

== NBL career ==
Herbert made his NBL debut in October 2007 for the South Dragons. He played 28 games during the 2007/08 season, averaging 3.9 points and 2.0 rebounds per game. He returned to the Dragons for the 2008/09 season and won his first and only NBL Championship in March 2009. In 37 games for the Dragons in 2008/09, he averaged 6.5 points, 1.9 rebounds and 1.0 assists per game.

In June 2009, Herbert signed with the Adelaide 36ers after the Dragons folded following their championship-winning season. Herbert had a career-best season in 2009/10, averaging 8.1 points, 2.7 rebounds and 1.9 assists in 27 games. He was subsequently in the running for three NBL awards – the most improved player, the best sixth man, and best defensive player.

In April 2010, Herbert re-signed with the 36ers for the 2010/11 season. In September 2010, during a pre-season game against the Townsville Crocodiles in Adelaide, Herbert tore his right ACL, which ruled him out for the entire season.

In June 2011, after fully recovering from knee surgery, Herbert re-signed with the 36ers for the 2011/12 season. He played all 28 games for the 36ers in his final NBL season, averaging 4.4 points and 2.4 rebounds per game.

== Personal ==
Herbert and his wife Sally have two sons, Xavier and Noah. His father, Craig, played 102 NBL games for the Supercats between 1982 and 1987.
