= Cowies Creek Rail Bridge No. 1 =

Rail bridge in Victoria, Australia

Coordinates: 38°05′16″S 144°19′33″E

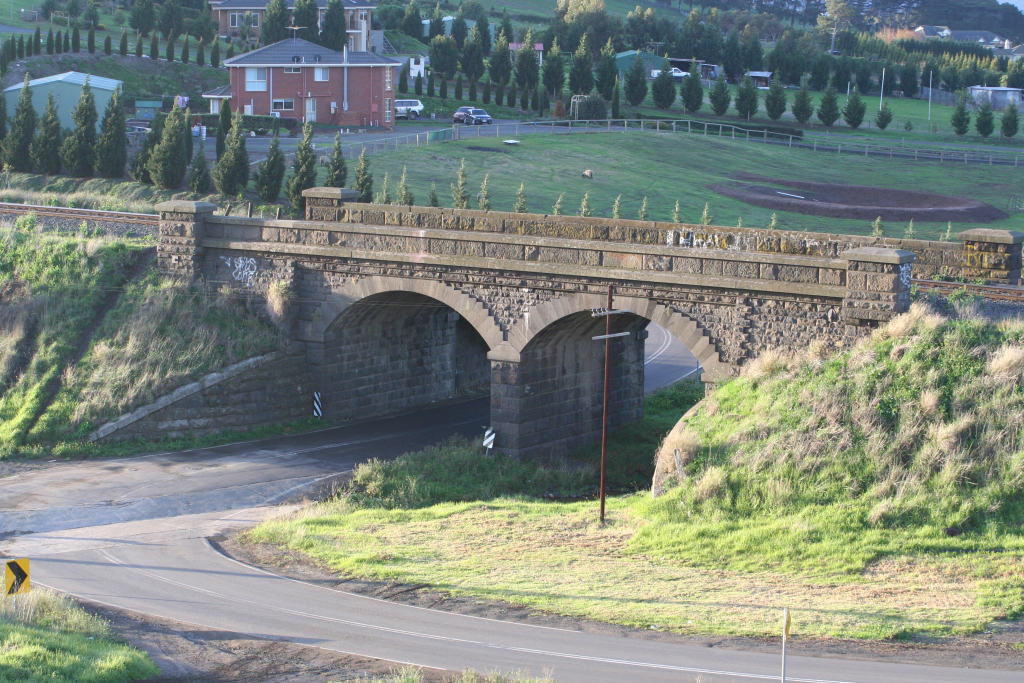
Bridge viewed from the southern side

Cowies Creek Rail Bridge No. 1 is a bridge in Victoria, Australia, on the Geelong-Ballarat rail line in the outer Geelong suburb of Bell Post Hill. Constructed of bluestone in 1860 to cross both Cowies Creek and a roadway, the structure is listed in the Victorian Heritage Register.
