= Drumcondra, Victoria =

Drumcondra Geelong, Victoria
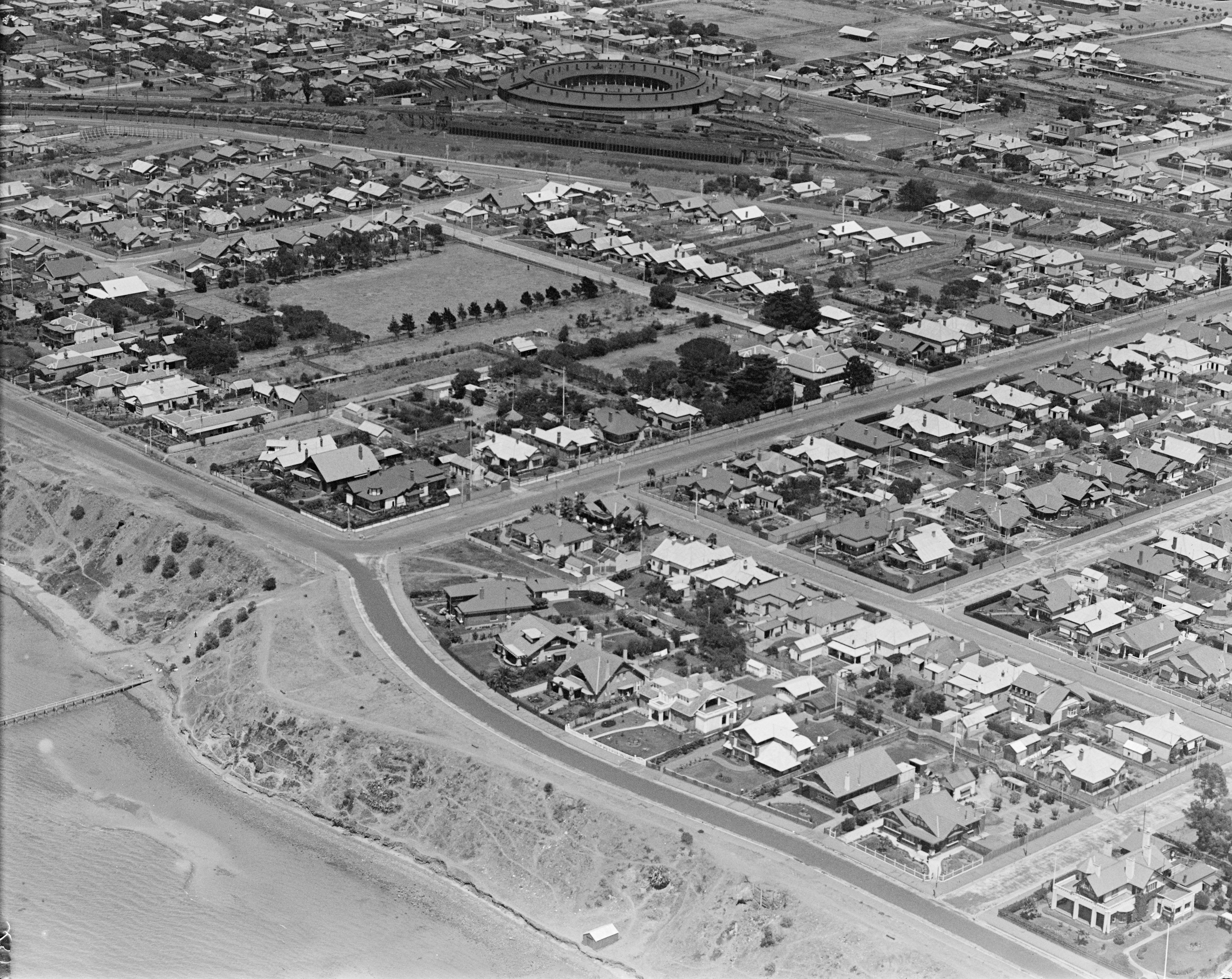
- The Esplanade, Drumcondra in 1927. The railway roundhouse at the Geelong West locomotive depot is visible in the background.

- Coordinates: 38.132°S 144.354°E
- Population: 560 (2016 census)
  - Density: 1,900/km^{2} (4,800/sq mi)
- Postcode(s): 3215
- Area: 0.3 km^{2} (0.1 sq mi)
- LGA(s): City of Greater Geelong
- State electorate(s): Lara
- Federal division(s): Corio
Suburbs around Drumcondra:
North Geelong	Rippleside	Corio Bay
North Geelong	Drumcondra	Corio Bay
Geelong West	Geelong CBD	Corio Bay

Drumcondra (/drʌmkɒndrə/) is a residential bayside suburb of Geelong, Victoria, Australia, overlooking Corio Bay. It is the smallest suburb in Geelong and one of the smallest in Victoria. It was named after Drumcondra, which is an inner suburb of Dublin, Ireland. At the 2016 census, Drumcondra had a population of 560.

Drumcondra is bounded by the Melbourne Road, Glenleith Avenue, The Esplanade and Bell Parade. It is a compact suburb, with only nine streets and around 200 houses. Some of Geelong's most valuable real estate is located in the area, particularly along The Esplanade.

== History ==
The first house in the area was built on the site of 5 Glenleith Avenue in 1912. Lunan House mansion is located in the suburb, built of Barrabool sandstone for the wool merchant James Strachan in 1849-50. After having various other owners, it was purchased by the Victorian Education Department in about 1937, and became Geelong Teachers' College in 1950. In the 1980s, it was converted back to a private house. Lunan House is listed on the Victorian Heritage Register.

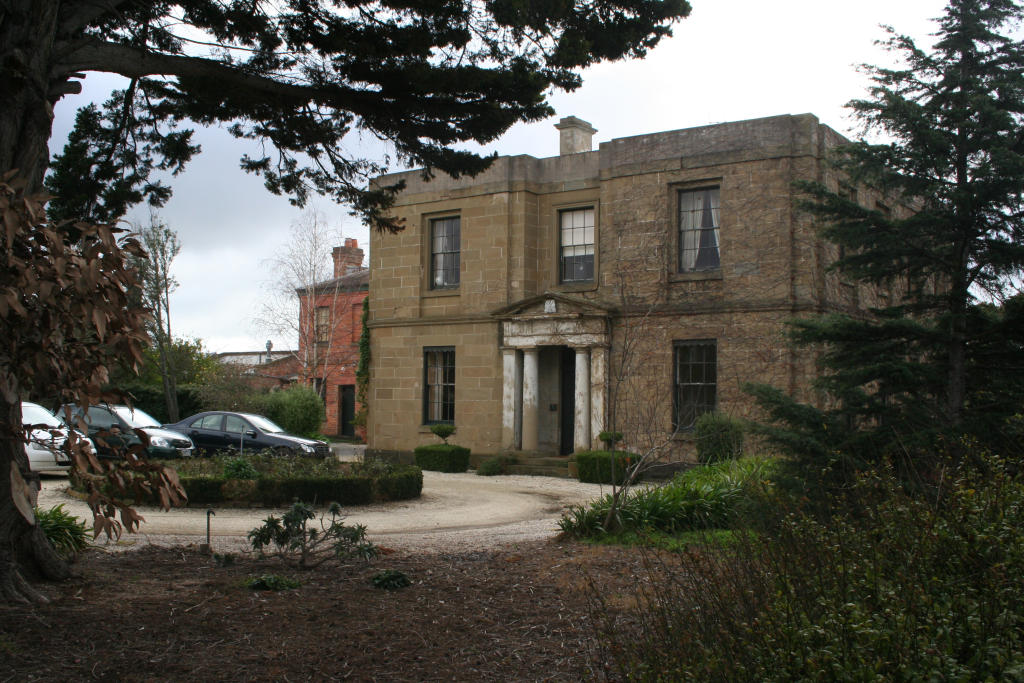
Lunan House, 2008
