= Corio, Victoria =

Corio
- Suburb
- Interactive map of Corio
- Coordinates: 38.074°S 144.359°E
- Country: Australia
- State: Victoria
- City: Geelong
- LGA: City of Greater Geelong
- Location: 8 km (5.0 mi) from Geelong; 66 km (41 mi) from Melbourne
- Established: 1860s

Government
  - State electorate: Lara
  - Federal division: Corio

Area
  - Total: 12.6 km^{2} (4.9 sq mi)
- Elevation: 17 m (56 ft)

Population
  - Total: 15,296 (2016 census)
  - Density: 1,214/km^{2} (3,144/sq mi)
- Postcode: 3214
Suburbs around Corio
Lovely Banks	Lara	Avalon
Lovely Banks	Corio	Avalon
Lovely Banks	Norlane and North Shore	Corio Bay

Corio (/kəraɪoʊ/) is a residential and industrial area, which forms one of the largest suburbs of Geelong, Victoria in Australia. It is located approximately 9 km north of the Geelong central business district. The area was formerly known as Cowie's Creek after James Cowie, an early land owner who was active in the local and state government.

== History ==
Explorers Hume and Hovell reached Corio and reported that the local Aboriginals referred to the area as 'coraiyo', meaning either 'small marsupial' or 'sandy cliffs'.

Land in the area was first subdivided and sold in 1852 as "Cowie's Creek", named after an early local businessman, James Cowie. By the 1860s, Cowie's Creek was home to two hotels and a population of approximately 500 people.

A post office opened on 16 November 1864, and was renamed as Corio Post Office in 1913. It was situated on School Road, adjacent to the railway level crossing. In 1963, it was renamed Corio North Post Office, after the current Corio Post Office opened at the Corio Shopping Centre. The post office is located on the ground floor of the centre, having moved from its original first-floor location. Corio North Post Office was closed in 1977.

In 1914, the Geelong Grammar School moved from Geelong to its current location near Limeburners Lagoon, an arm of Corio Bay.

The Corio Village Shopping Centre complex was opened in 1973. Since a re-development in 2007/08, it has been known as the Corio Shopping Centre.

== Industry ==
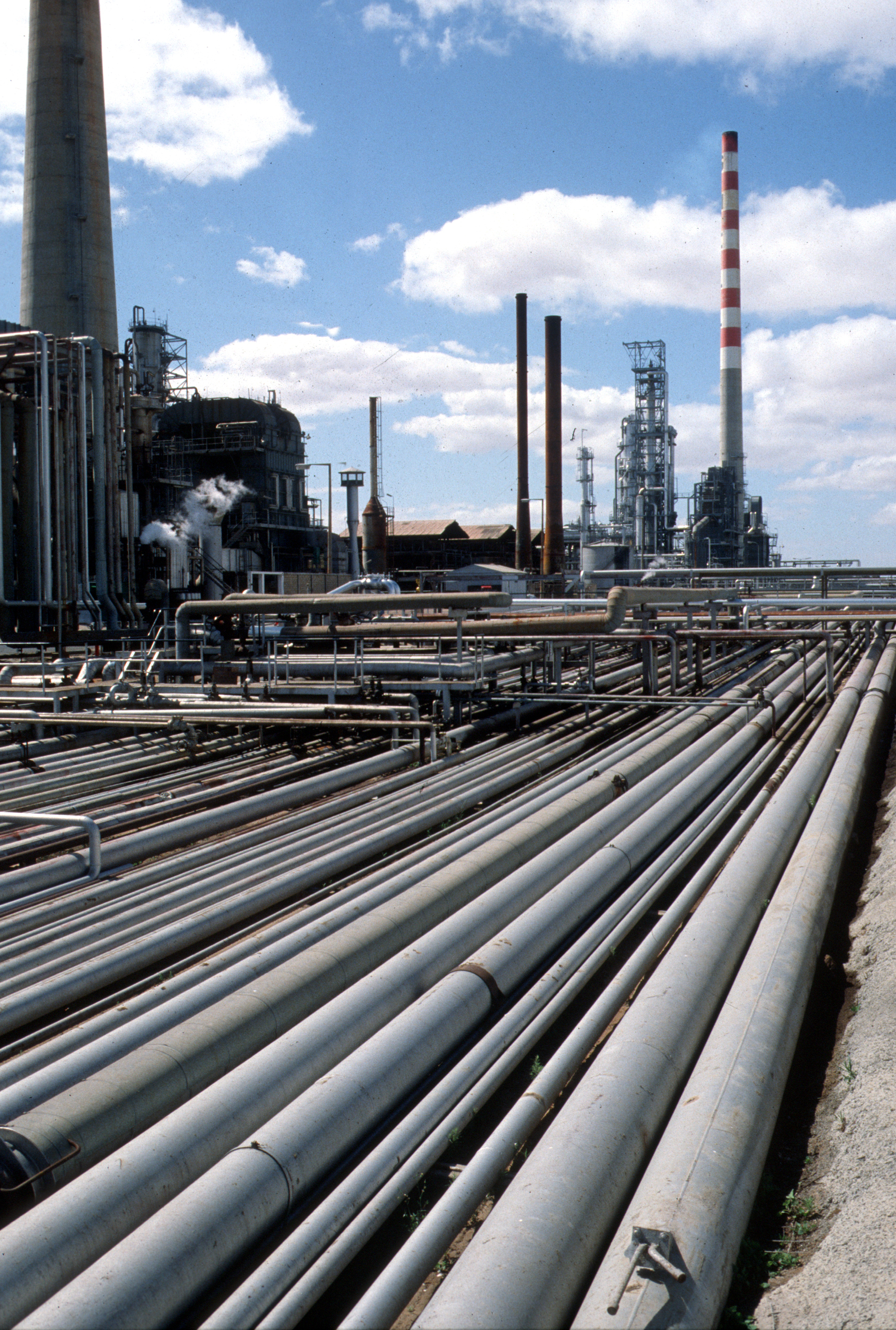
The refinery in 2000

The most notable industry in Corio is the Geelong Oil Refinery, which was opened by Shell Australia in 1956. In February 2014, the refinery was sold to the Swiss-based oil company Vitol, which has branded its Australian operations as Viva Energy and floated it on the ASX, retaining a minority stake.

== Transport ==
Cars are the predominant mode of transport in the Corio region. CDC Geelong provides bus transport between areas of Corio and the Geelong Central Business District, under contract from Public Transport Victoria. Taxis and ridesharing options are also available. Corio railway station is served by V/Line trains to Geelong and Melbourne. With the opening of the Geelong Bypass in 2009, Corio is now bypassed by through-traffic on the Princes Freeway.

== Sport ==
Geelong SC was formed in 1958 and currently play in the National Premier Leagues Victoria 3. Their home ground is located at Stead Park.

The suburb has an Australian rules football team, founded in 1974, competing in the Geelong & District Football League. Also, linked with the Corio Sporting Club is a cricket club, a little league founded in 1977, and the netball club.

The Corio Athletic Club, founded in 1969, competes at Landy Field in South Geelong and the Corio Little Athletics Club, founded in 1967, competes at the Corio Athletics Stadium in Goldsworthy Road, which was opened in 1972 by Ron Clarke.

== Demographics ==
According to the 2016 census of Population, there were 15,296 people in Corio.

- 49.2% of these people were male and 50.8% were female.
- The median age of these people was 35.
- Aboriginal and Torres Strait Islander people made up 2.0% of the population.
- 68.3% of people were born in Australia. The next most common countries of birth were England 3.1%, Afghanistan 1.9%, Myanmar 1.8%, Thailand 1.5% and Philippines 1.2%.
- 74.6% of people spoke only English at home. Other languages spoken at home included Karen 3.1%, Hazaraghi 1.3%, Dari 1.1%, Croatian 1.0% and Vietnamese 0.9%.
- The most common responses for religion were No Religion 34.4%, Catholic 21.6% and Anglican 10.6%.

Corio is a "working class" suburb, adjacent to and incorporating industrial estates - with 22.4% of its employed residents of age 15 years and over nominating 'Labourer' as their chosen occupation (compared to 9.5% in the whole of Australia). Numbers occupied as Technicians and Trades Workers, Machinery Operators, and Drivers are also higher than the national average. According to the 2006 census, the largest employer type was "Motor Vehicle" and "Motor Vehicle Part Manufacturing". As such, the 2016 closure of the Ford plant, a long-term employer, will reduce employment opportunities in the future. In the 2016 Census 3.5% of employed people worked in Supermarket and Grocery Stores. Other major industries of employment included Takeaway Food Services 3.3%, Hospitals (except Psychiatric Hospitals) 3.3%, Road Freight Transport 3.0% and Aged Care Residential Services 2.9%. In 2013, 2.3% of mortgages in Corio had become delinquent, up from 1.5% in September 2012, and is amongst the highest numbers of all suburbs in Victoria. Reports have attributed this rate to job cuts at Alcoa, Ford, and Target that year. Historically speaking, Ford had its plant in full production by August 1926, producing 36,000 T-models over the next two years of work. During World War II, Ford manufactured military vehicles and all manner of craft & weaponry. It then concentrated its post-war goals on engine manufacturing for the Ford Falcon model (produced at Broadmeadows).

According to the 2016 Census, 5,855 residents age 15 years and over were in the labour force: Of these 49.7% were employed full time, 31.7% were employed part-time and 12.5% were unemployed.

The Corio median price for housing, given in The Age Domain Property review of September 2012, was $223,000; among the most affordable in the state - more costly than neighbouring Norlane at $205,000, but lower than Melton South at $240,000.

== See also ==
- Corio Bay
- Corio railway station
- Division of Corio
- Whittington, Victoria
- Werribee
