= Manifold Heights =

Coordinates: 38.140°S 144.33°E

- Suburb
- Interactive map of Manifold Heights
- Country: Australia
- State: Victoria
- City: Geelong
- LGA: City of Greater Geelong

Government
  - State electorate: Geelong
  - Federal division: Corio

Population
  - Total: 2,649 (2016 census)
- Postcode: 3218
Suburbs around Manifold Heights
Hamlyn Heights	Hamlyn Heights	Hamlyn Heights
Herne Hill	Manifold Heights	Geelong West
Newtown	Newtown	Newtown

Manifold Heights is a residential suburb of Geelong. At the 2016 census, Manifold Heights had a population of 2,649.

It was named after Manifolds' vineyards, that existed between Minerva Road and Shannon Avenue, immediately east of the Geelong Western Cemetery in Herne Hill. The vineyards were owned by the prominent Western District pastoralists, John and Peter Manifold.

The Post Office opened on 25 March 1929, but has always been known as Manifold.

Holy Spirit Church, located in Bostock Avenue, is listed on the Victorian Heritage Register.
