= Bell Park =

- Suburb
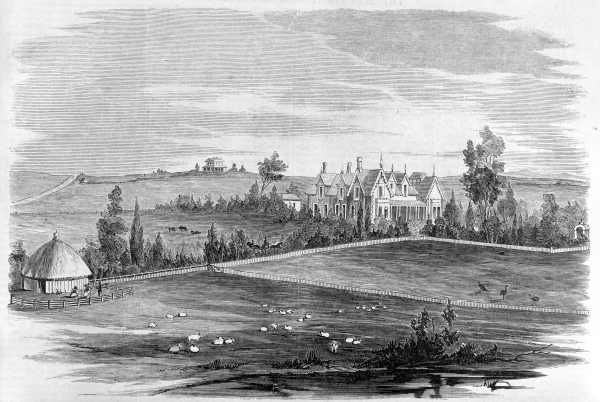
- Bell Park in 1863, near the homestead of Captain John Bell

- Interactive map of Bell Park
- Coordinates: 38.110°S 144.338°E
- Country: Australia
- State: Victoria
- City: Geelong
- LGA: City of Greater Geelong
- Location: 3 km (1.9 mi) from Geelong

Government
  - State electorate: Lara
  - Federal division: Corio

Area
  - Total: 2.8 km^{2} (1.1 sq mi)

Population
  - Total: 5,009 (2016 census)
  - Density: 1,790/km^{2} (4,630/sq mi)
- Postcode: 3215
Suburbs around Bell Park
Lovely Banks	Norlane	Norlane
Bell Post Hill	Bell Park	North Geelong
Hamlyn Heights	North Geelong	North Geelong

Bell Park is a residential suburb of Geelong, Victoria, Australia. It is located 6 km (3.7 mi) north-west of the Geelong city centre and is bordered to the north by Cowies Creek, to the east by Thompson Road, to the south by the Midland Highway and to the west by Anakie Road.

At the 2016 Census, Bell Park had a population of 5,009.

== History ==
Bell Park was named after the Bell Park homestead built by an early settler named John Bell. Part of Bell's homestead is preserved at the Grace McKellar Centre.

In the early 1950s, residential development of the area increased with migrants and refugees arriving from Europe after World War II. The Post Office opened on 1 July 1953. There are two Ukrainian churches in Bell Park—one Orthodox and one Catholic. There is also one Russian Orthodox church.

== Facilities ==
As of 2022, there are three shopping strips in Bell Park.

The strip along Milton Street has a news agent, hairdresser, day spa, bottle shop, Dnister Ukrainian Credit Co-operative, post office, hardware store, butcher, barber, bakery and small supermarket.

The strip on Hughes Street has a greengrocer, barber, butcher, cafe/bakery, supermarket and pharmacy

The strip along Separation Street has two hairdressers, gym, day spa, news agent, butcher, two cake stores, supermarket, real estate agent, milk bar, chiropractor, Thai take-away, fish and chips store, pizza store, Croatian restaurant/club, Asian grocery store, bank, stationer, bottle store, pharmacy, doctor clinic, cafe, Chinese take-away, chicken and chips take-away.

=== Sport ===
The Bell Park Football Club are an Australian Rules football team competing in the Geelong Football League.

Hume reserve has three soccer pitches and is home to the Corio Soccer Club.

=== Education ===
Bell Park is home to:

- North Geelong Secondary College
- Nelson Park School
- Bell Park North Primary School
- Holy Family Catholic Primary School.

== Heritage listed sites ==
45 Ballarat Road Bell Park
