= Covenant College (Geelong) =

Location
- Geelong, Victoria; Australia; 38.097°S 144.318°E

Information
- Established: 1979
- Principal: Joshua McEwen
- Enrolment: 439

Covenant College, formerly known as Geelong Christian School, is a Christian parent-controlled school in Bell Post Hill, Victoria.

Established in 1979, the school's programs are academic. The college owns a farm and conducts agricultural and land management classes. In 2019, Covenant College was named the Schools that Excel non-government school winner for regional and rural Victoria.
