= North Geelong =

Coordinates: 38°06′29″S 144°20′35″E

North Geelong Geelong, Victoria
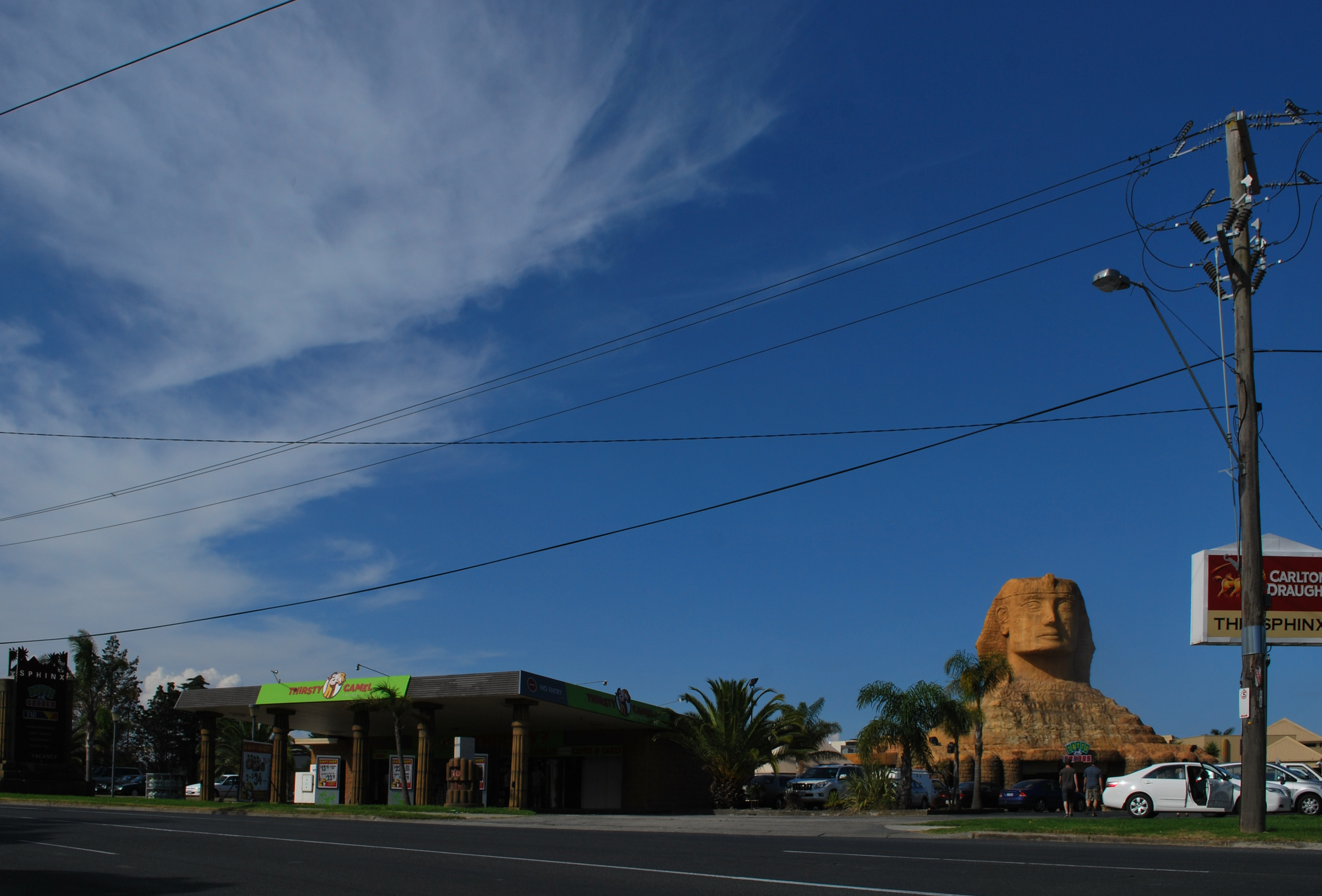
- North Geelong Sphinx Hotel
- Population: 2,966 (2016 census)
- Postcode(s): 3215
- Elevation: 19 m (62 ft)
- Location: 6 km (4 mi) N of Geelong; 69 km (43 mi) WSW of Melbourne
- LGA(s): City of Greater Geelong
- State electorate(s): Lara
- Federal division(s): Corio
Suburbs around North Geelong:
Bell Park	Norlane	North Shore
Bell Park	North Geelong	Corio Bay
Hamlyn Heights	Geelong West	Rippleside; Drumcondra

North Geelong is a suburb of Geelong in the Australian state of Victoria. The suburb was bypassed by traffic from Melbourne coming from the Princes Freeway by the creation of the Geelong Ring Road, which was complete in 2009. At the 2016 census, North Geelong had a population of 2,966.

The Australian department store, Target (not affiliated with the American Target Corporation), was founded in Geelong in 1925 and was called Lindsay's at the time. Its head office was located on Thompson Road but is no longer there.

The suburb has an Australian rules football team competing in the Geelong & District Football League and a Croatian association football team North Geelong Warriors FC that are currently competing in the National Premier Leagues Victoria.

== History ==
From 1858 to 1971 a gasworks was operated by the Geelong Gas Company on a site on Victoria and Douro Streets with a connecting rail to the Geelong Ports. The current Post Office opened in 1987. An earlier office dating from 1886 was replaced by Rippleside in 1986.

Osborne House was built on the shores of Corio Bay in 1858 as a private residence, later being used by the Royal Australian Navy, local council officers, and is currently the home of the Geelong Maritime Museum.

In the 1950s through to the early 1970s the suburb saw a drastic increase in housing construction, in part fuelled by Geelong's growing industries and manufacturing sector.

In 1973, the Victoria Street level crossing adjacent to the southern end of the station was replaced by a road overpass, known as the Margaret Street overpass, and a pedestrian underpass. In 1976, both platforms were extended by over 60 metres. The main station building on Platform 1 was replaced on 8 August 1990, and in 2008 the smaller building on Platform 2 was replaced by a metal shelter.

In 1998 hotel owner Ray Ramia erected a 15m-high polystyrene replica of the Great Sphinx of Giza atop his hotel, known as the Sphinx Hotel.

In Fyansford Cement Works Railway, originally opened in 1918, was removed in the early 2000s after the cement works closure in 2000. The train lines removal helped ease growing congestion on Thompson Road, and reduced noise pollution for local residents. Prior to its removal, a bike and pedestrian path, known as Linear Park, was constructed in the 1980s alongside the rail line.

In 2012 Bayside Demolition started operating from the federal mills and has since become Geelong's leading demolition contractor

In 2012, a part of North Geelong was redistributed. This included businesses and houses on the eastern side of Melbourne Road and around St. Helens Park, between Victoria Street to Swinburne Street. Initially residents hoped to become their own suburb called 'St. Helens', though the name was unavailable and instead joined neighbouring Rippleside.

In 2017, Target announced they would be leaving their North Geelong headquarters for a larger facility. Their new facility is currently being constructed at Williams Landing opposite the rail station of the same name in Melbourne's west.

== Geelong Arena ==
The Geelong Arena includes an indoor pool, basketball court capable of hosting 2000 people. The Arena also acts as an events centre hosting numerous musicians and acts over the years, and served as a venue during the 2006 Commonwealth Games basketball tournaments.

== Geelong Golf Club ==
Formed in 1892, the original 18-hole course was one of Australia's oldest courses and was open for more than 100 years. The golf course was closed for a number of years during its re-development of the site and has since re-opened as a nine-hole course.

In late 2013 construction of the Geelong Golf Club Residential Estate began on the golf club site, with plans for 350 new homes, parks and 9-hole golf course included as a part of the redevelopment.

== Geelong Saleyards ==
The early Geelong Town Corporation bought land for the saleyards in 1867 and opened the facility in 1869. It has operated as a livestock exchange ever since.

Its location was chosen based on its proximity to North Geelong Station, with two rail lines, the Ballarat and Warrnambool lines, converging nearby.

== North Geelong Resource Recovery Centre & Transfer station ==
Located on Douro Street, the facility accepts most domestic waste. Recyclable materials such as paper, glass, metal, white goods and technology are accepted free of charge. Some items like furniture and books are resold at an on site shop.

North Geelong is also the home of Bayside Demolition, and a number of major industrial businesses that contribute to its strong resources recycling contribution to Geelongs economy

== Public Spaces & Parkland ==
=== Corio Bay Foreshore ===
The area runs parallel to the St Helens Boat ramp, popular with recreational fisherman. With a clear view of the nearby Corio Quay shipping ports.

=== Cowies Creek ===
The efforts of the adjoining Wathaurong Aboriginal Co-operative and Geelong City Council have aided in the Cowies Creek preservation. Cowies Creek is a public wetland with boardwalks running throughout. The conservation area hosts native species, including snakes, lizards and water birds, as well as various bush trees and grasses.

Car parking, space and scattered picnic tables service the area.

=== Osborne Park ===
Osborne Park is a reserve adjacent to historic Osborne House. The reserve has two ovals, one with a turf wicket and also accommodates a fire brigade, running track and netball court.

=== Osborne Avenue Reserve ===
This small neighbourhood park includes a slide, swing and rocker.

=== Tom McKean Linear Park ===
In Fyansford Cement Works Railway, originally opened in 1918, was removed in the early 2000s after the cement works closure in 2000. The train lines removal helped ease growing congestion on Thompson Road, and reduced noise pollution for local residents. Prior to its removal, a bike and pedestrian path, known as Linear Park, was constructed in the 1980s alongside the rail line.

The Linear Park runs through North Geelong, Bell Park, Hamlyn Heights through to Fyansford.

=== Western Oval ===
The sport and recreational reserve has a playground, sports oval suitable for cricket and football and netball courts. Its historic Grand Stand remains in use.

== Wathaurong Aboriginal Co-operative ==
The Wathaurong Aboriginal Co-operative is a local community centre which serves the local Wathaurong people, who originally inhabited North Geelong and its surrounding suburbs prior to white settlement in the 1850s.

== Transport ==
=== Buses ===
Several bus routes serve the suburb, including:

Route 1, Route 20, Route 22 and Route 24.

=== North Geelong Station ===
The North Geelong railway station services North Geelong and its surrounding suburbs.

== Heritage listings ==
North Geelong contains a number of heritage listed sites, including:

- 13 Mackey Street: Federal Woollen Mills
- 51 Swinburne Street: Osborne House

== See also ==
- North Geelong railway station
- North Geelong Warriors
