= Western Heights College =

Location
- 37-61 Vines road Hamlyn Heights, Victoria, 3215; Australia; 38.1239864355506°S 144.32809661934485°E

Information
- Type: Secondary, co-ed
- Established: 1985
- Status: Open
- Principal: Fiona Taylor
- Years offered: 7–12
- Enrolment: 1000-1050 (2024)
- Campuses: Western Heights, Vines Road
- Campus type: Suburban
- Houses: Minerva (yellow), Quamby (red), Vines (green), Barton (blue)
- Colours: Blue and orange
- Website: www.whc.vic.edu.au

Western Heights College is a government-funded co-educational secondary and specialist sports school in Hamlyn Heights, Geelong, Victoria, Australia.

The school campus adjoins the Vines Road Community Centre.

== History ==
The college was created in 1985 from the merger of three existing secondary schools: Geelong West Technical School, Bell Park High School, and Bell Park Secondary College.

For some time, Western Heights College had three campuses: the Junior Years Campus (formerly Minerva campus and Barton Campus) for years 7, 8 and 9, and 10. the Senior Years Campus (formerly Quamby Campus) for years, 11 and 12, located in the suburbs of Herne Hill and Hamlyn Heights respectively.

In 2010, the City of Greater Geelong developed a Master Plan for Hamlyn Park Recreation Reserve which incorporating Western Heights College. The new facilities included sports grounds and netball courts with stage 2 including a basketball stadium.

In 2011, the school began relocating to a single location on Vines Road, formerly the site of the Department of Human Services Barwon South Western Regional Office and, before that, the Geelong Teachers' College. The Barton campus closed at the end of the 2008, and the completion of stage one allowed Years 7 to 9 to start school at the new site at the beginning of July 2011.

When the school was opened the college had pioneered "learning communities" of 100 to 120 students - a step away from the traditional arrangements of classrooms.

In 2020 the school started its Specialist Sporting Program - basketball being it first pillar. In 2021, AFL was introduced. Further sports programs were introduced; Netball (2022), Soccer (2023) and an Aspiring Athlete Program in 2024.

In 2020 the school opened its high-performance centre to serve its Specialist Sports Program.

In 2022 the Victorian Government committed to delivering a $7.5 million competition-grade gymnasium to replace the ageing offsite Quamby avenue basketball gym.

In 2023, teacher Farid Anawati was recognised by the Department of Education for his extraordinary contribution to education with over 55 years of service at the school.

In 2025, the High-Performance and Olympic Pathway Program was introduced.

In 2026, the college opened its new competition-grade gymnasium to serve its Sports Specialist Programs with enrolments of over 500 students.

== Community college ==
The college shares some communal facilities with the public. These facilities include: Community/School Library, Vines Road Community Centre, Seniors Club and a shared sporting oval and netball courts. These facilities are owned and co-managed by the Department of Education Victoria and the City of Greater Geelong.

== Specialist Sporting Program ==
By 2024, over 530 students are in the Specialist Sporting Program with intake based on a competitive selection process.

Specialist Sporting pillars and directors:

- AFL: Matthew Scarlett
- Basketball: Ash Arnott
- Netball: Susan Meaney
- Soccer: Joey Didulica
- High-Performance and Olympic Pathway

== Sporting achievements ==
Achievements at state or national level.

=== National ===
==== Basketball ====
- (gold) U15 Boys National Champions 2025

==== Soccer ====
- (gold) Year 7 Girls National Champions Soccer / Australian Schools' Cup 2026
- (silver) Runners-up - U15 boys Bill Turner Cup (Australian national tournament of 465 teams) 2026

=== State ===
==== Athletics ====
U18 SSV State Athletics Championships 2024

- (silver) Second - Joshua Unthank, 1500m
- (bronze) Third - Joshua Unthank, 800m

U18 SSV State Athletics Championships 2023

- (gold) First - Joshua Unthank, 800m
- (silver) Second - Jackson Unthank, 1500m
- (bronze) Third - Joshua Unthank, 1500m

All Schools Track and Field Championships 2022

- (silver) Second - Joshua Unthank, 1500m.
- (silver) Second - Joshua Unthank, 800m.
- (bronze) Third - Jackson Unthank, 800m

==== Australian Rules Football ====
- (gold) Senior Boys School Sport Victoria 2024
- (silver) Runners-up - Year 10 Boys Intermediate, Herald-Sun Shield 2024
- (silver) Runners-up - Girls Intermediate, School Sport Victoria 2024
- (gold) Senior Boys Victorian State Champions 2002
- (gold) Year 7 Boys Victorian State Champions 1994

==== Basketball ====
- (gold) U17 Boys Victorian Champions Cup 2023
- (gold) Senior Boys Victorian Champions Cup 2001

==== Cricket ====
- (gold) Senior Boys Victorian State Champions 2014
- (gold) Intermediate Boys Victorian State Champions 2012
- (gold) Senior Boys Victorian State Champions 2011
- (gold) Year 7 Girls Victorian State Champions 2011
- (gold) Senior Girls Victorian State Champions 1998
- (gold) Year 7 Boys Victorian State Champions 1994

==== Netball ====
- (gold) Intermediate Boys Victorian State Champions 2026
- (gold) Senior Boys Victorian State Champions 2025

==== Soccer ====
- (gold) Year 7 Girls Victorian State Champions 2026
- (gold) Year 8 Boys Victorian State Champions 2026
- (gold) Year 9/10 Girls Victorian State Champions 2026
- (gold) U15 Boys Victorian State Champions 2026
- (silver) Runners-up - Senior Girls Victorian State Championship 2026
- (silver) Runners-up - Senior Boys Victorian State Championship 2026
- (gold) U15 Boys Victorian State Champions 2024

== Notable alumni ==
Includes Alumni from merged foundation schools, Bell Park High School, Bell Park Secondary College and Geelong West Tech.

=== Academia, science and media ===
- Adam Deller - Professor of Astrophysics
- Dylan Howard - Entertainment journalist and media executive
- Dr Stuart Minchin - CEO and Director at Bureau of Meteorology (Bell Park High School)
- Lea Waters AM - Psychologist and author

=== Sport and athletics ===
- Alex Harris - Paralympic swimmer
- Andrew Bews - AFL player (Geelong West Tech School)
- Bev Francis - World champion power-lifter and Hall of Fame inductee (Bell Park High School)
- Brendan McCartney - AFL football coach (Bell Park High School)
- Dan Ryan - Netball player and coach, Australian representative
- Finnbar Maley - AFL player
- Harvey Davis - AFL player (Bell Park High School)
- James Worpel - AFL player
- Jeff Sykes - 1978 World Rowing Championships bronze medallist (Geelong West Tech School)
- Kate Allen - Olympic gold medallist (Bell Park High School)
- Nathan Herbert - Basketball player and NBL champion
- Simone McKinnis - Netball player, 2 x World Champion (Bell Park High School)
- Terry Bright - AFL player (Geelong West Tech School)
- Wade Chapman - AFL player (Bell Park Secondary College)
