= Herne Hill, Victoria =

Herne Hill
- Suburb
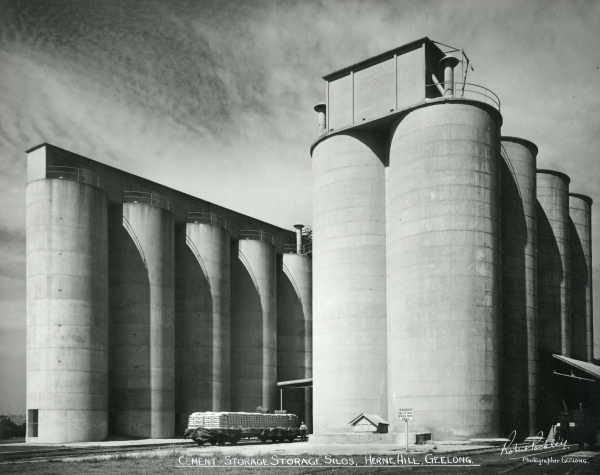
- Cement storage silos, now demolished, 1940

- Interactive map of Herne Hill
- Coordinates: 38.1329°S 144.3305°E
- Country: Australia
- State: Victoria
- City: Geelong
- LGA: City of Greater Geelong

Government
  - State electorate: Geelong
  - Federal division: Corio

Population
  - Total: 3,413 (2016 census)
- Postcode: 3218
Suburbs around Herne Hill
Fyansford	Hamlyn Heights	Hamlyn Heights
Fyansford	Herne Hill	Manifold Heights
Fyansford	Newtown	Manifold Heights

Herne Hill is a residential suburb of Geelong, Victoria, Australia. At the 2016 census, Herne Hill had a population of 3,413. It is in the federal Division of Corio, and its postcode is 3218.

The former Geelong Protestant and Orphan Asylum and Common School was built in 1855, and was one of four orphanages set up in Victoria during the 1850s.

After the orphanage moved to a new site in 1933, the building was acquired by the Australian Portland Cement Company Limited. It is heritage listed.

Suburban growth in Herne Hill came about after World War II.

The state primary and Catholic primary schools opened in 1954 and 1955, and a state technical school opened in 1954. In 1956, the Catholic Brigidine Sisters opened a convent and the associated Clonard College.

== Heritage listed sites ==
- "Karoomba" - 48 Heytesbury Street
