= Cowies Creek =

River in Victoria, Australia

Coordinates: 38°5′11″S 144°19′25″E

Cowies Creek is a creek flowing through the northern suburbs of Geelong, Victoria, Australia. It rises in wetlands in Moorabool and debouches at Corio Quay, Corio Bay. After 1909, the Geelong Harbour Trust excavated the mouth of Cowies Creek to create Corio Quay.
