= Corio Bay =

Bay in Victoria, Australia

- Corayo (Wathawurrung); Jillong (Wathawurrung)
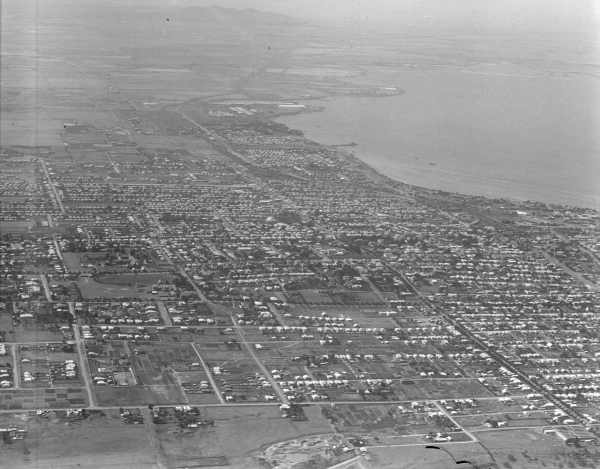
- Corio Bay, overlooking Geelong West, Drumcondra and North Geelong in 1927

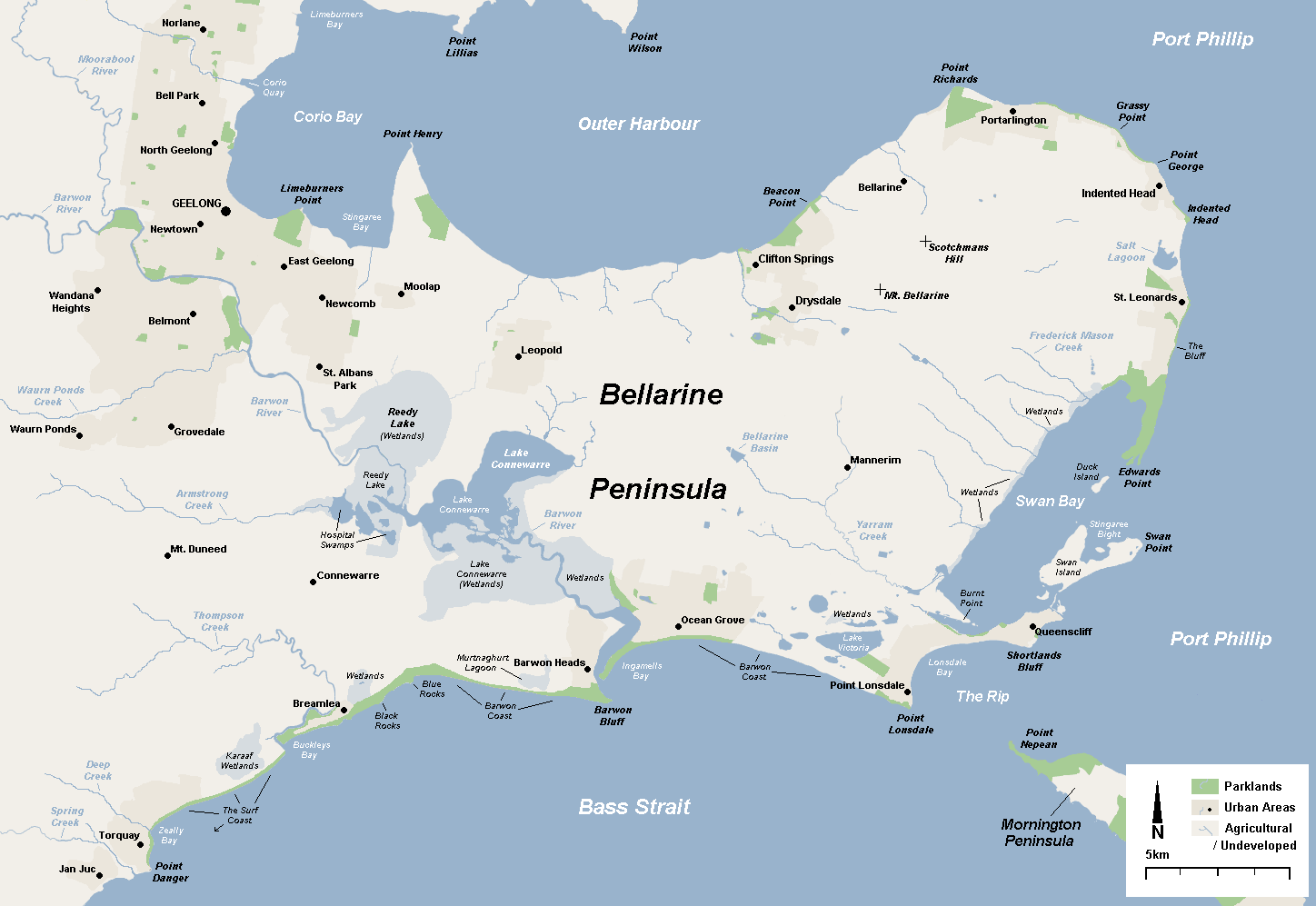

- Location of the bay in Victoria
- Interactive map of Corio Bay
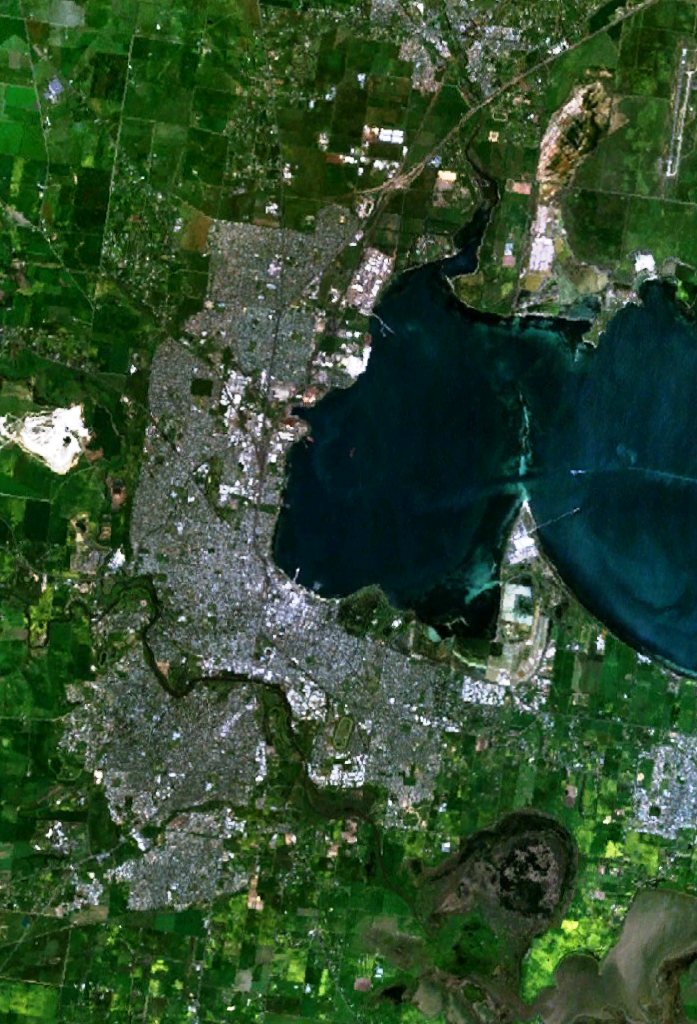
- Landsat 7 imagery of the greater Geelong area, showing Corio Bay
- Location: Port Phillip, Victoria
- Coordinates: 38°06′26″S 144°21′38″E
- Type: Bay
- Primary outflows: Port Phillip
- Frozen: never
- Settlements: Geelong; Corio

Ramsar Wetland
- Official name: Shoalwater and Corio Bays
- Designated: 1 March 1996
- Reference no.: 792

Corio Bay is one of numerous internal bays in the southwest corner of Australia's Port Phillip, and is the bay on which abuts the City of Geelong. The nearby suburb of Corio takes its name from Corio Bay.

== Etymology ==
When Hamilton Hume and William Hovell arrived at the bay in 1824 they met with the local Wautharong people who referred to the bay as "Jillong" and the surround land "Corayo", but by the time the area was surveyed in the late 1830s the Aboriginal names had been swapped. The names "Corayo" and "Jillong" had since been Anglicised to "Corio" and "Geelong".

== Shipping ==
The Port of Geelong is located on the shores of Corio Bay, and is the sixth largest port in Australia by tonnage.

Before the initial settlement of Geelong, a sandbar across the bay from Point Lillias to Point Henry prevented ships from entering the inner harbour. Ships were required to drop anchor in the bay, and cargo was brought into Geelong on small barges. At times it was possible to walk across the bay on the sandbar at low tide.

The first channel through the sandbar was started in 1853, providing less than 4 metres draught for ships. This channel was straightened out and dredged at a depth of 6 metres in the 1860s. In 1881 a new channel started that took 12 years to complete. It was named the Hopetoun Channel after Lord Hopetoun who opened it on 20 December 1893.

Management of the channels and port was the responsibility of the Geelong Harbour Trust that was formed in December 1905. In 1981, the Port of Geelong Authority took over from the trust. The authority was privatised by the State Government in mid 1996, being sold to TNT Logistics for $49.6 million. It was later re-branded as 'GeelongPort'.

== Leisure ==
The shores of Corio Bay have been a popular playground for Geelong residents. Since the 1930s, Eastern Beach has been a popular swimming location. Boating is also popular, with a number of public boat ramps and piers provided. The bay is also the home of the Royal Geelong Yacht Club that was established in 1859, and the adjacent Bay City Marina that was constructed in the 1980s. Sometimes, whales and dolphins can be seen in the bay.

== Commercial fishing ==
Commercial net fishing in Corio Bay ended in 2018 after campaigning by recreational fishing groups.

== Contamination ==
Industrial activity around Corio Bay has resulted in pollution to the bay:

- In 1974, severe cadmium contamination of mussels from Corio Bay was reported. Levels as high as 41.5 μg/g had been found. The Corio Bay contamination was traced to an industrial effluent which later ceased. After that time, cadmium levels in Corio Bay mussels decreased to below the NH&MRC limits.
- Lead levels were significantly high in mussels in Corio Bay in 1977-78 and remained above the maximum permitted concentration of 2.5 μg/g up to the last measurements made prior to 1992
- In 2002, Shell Australia was fined for three separate oil spills into Corio Bay.
- In 2003, Shell refinery had 63 spills to the bay up until 8 September of that year.
- In 2004, Shell Australia was ordered to pay $75,000 towards an environmental project near its Geelong refinery after it was convicted of polluting Corio Bay during three oil spills in 2003.
- In 2009, Shell Australia was fined over oil leaks into the bay and on land.
- In 2014, spills of 3500 litres and 6300 litres of an ammonia derivative chemical (diisopropylamine) used in oil refining by Viva Energy from the bayside oil refinery occurred.
- In 2016, Incitec Pivot was fined twice for illegally discharging about 1.7 million litres of treated wastewater and untreated stormwater into Corio Bay.
- In 2015, Impact Fertilisers was fined for two illegal discharges of contaminated liquid. During its investigations EPA found out that a second discharge had occurred. It is likely that this second discharge would have reached Corio Bay.
- In 2017, Midway Limited was fined for permitting a significant amount of contaminated water, the company's third spill in 12 months, to leave its site and enter Corio Bay.
- In 2019, Incitec Pivot Limited (Incitec) was fined $120,000 with conviction after toxic and highly corrosive sludge overflowed into Corio Bay through disused pipes.
- In 2021, the EPA fined Viva Energy $8261 after it found the refinery operator had breached its licence when a leak resulted in the discharge of BTEX, containing benzene, toluene, ethylbenzene and xylene, three times its limit into cooling water and Corio Bay.

== Gallery ==
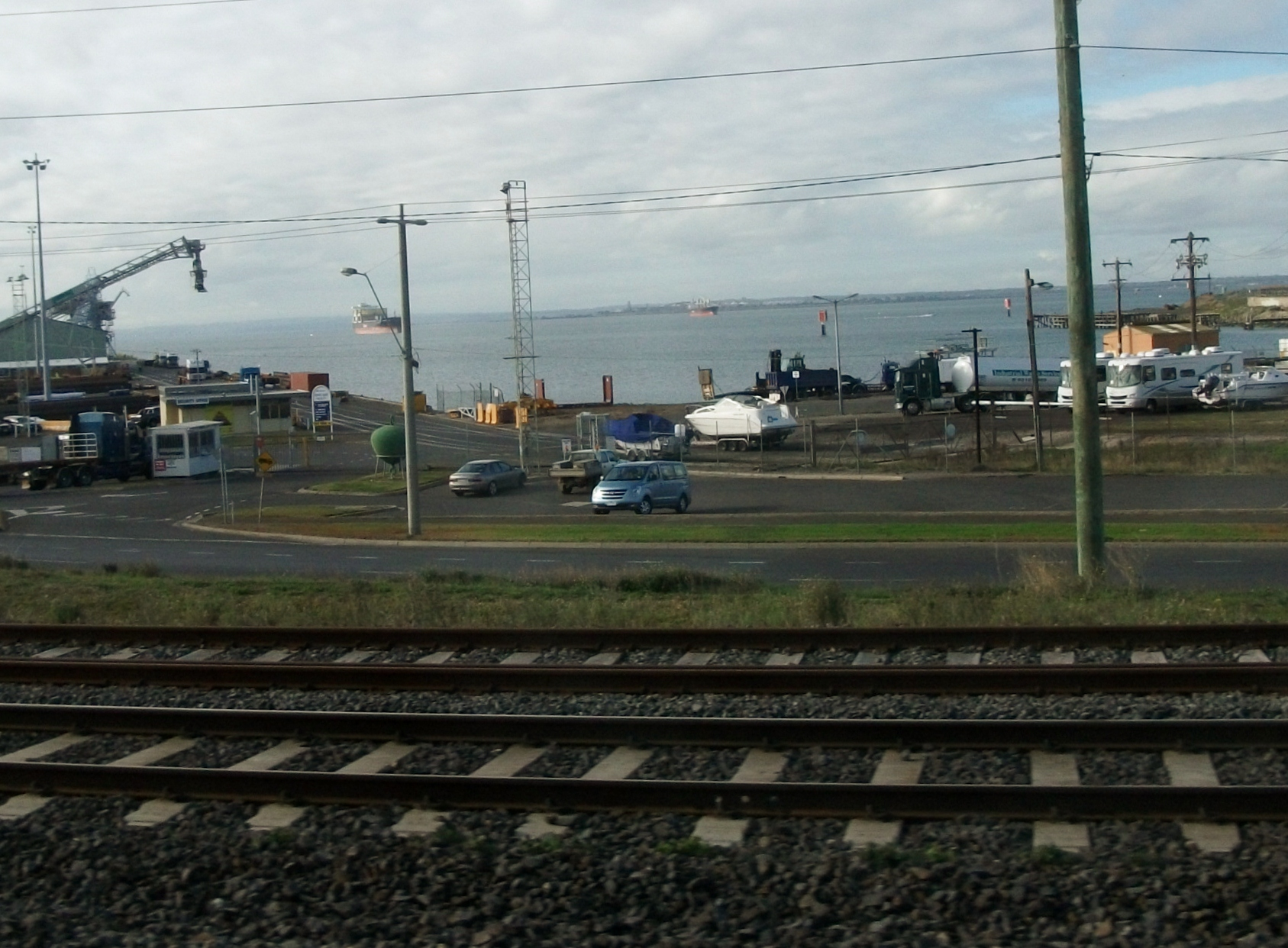
Corio Bay, from The Overland, May 2011

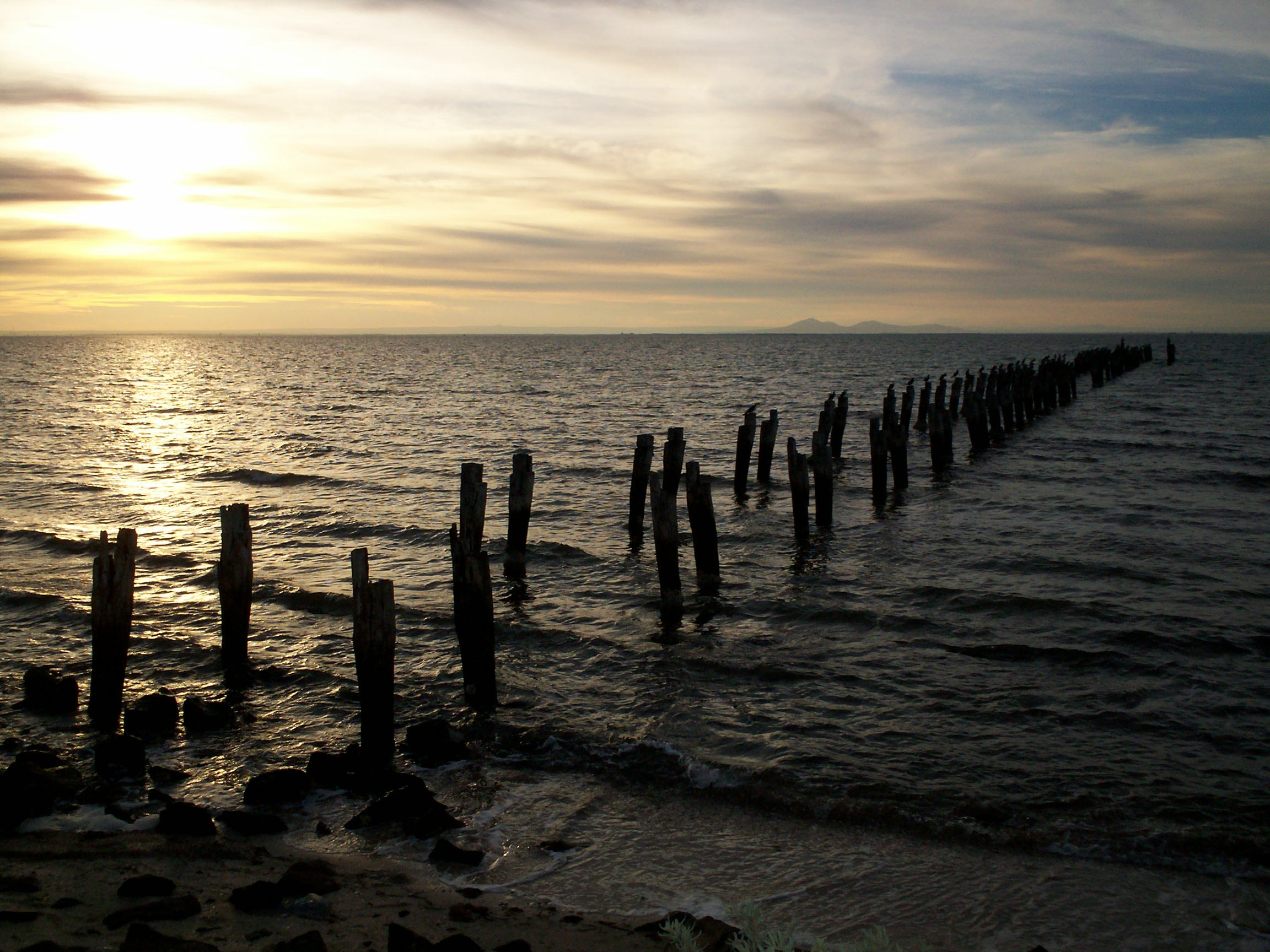
Corio Bay, from Clifton Springs

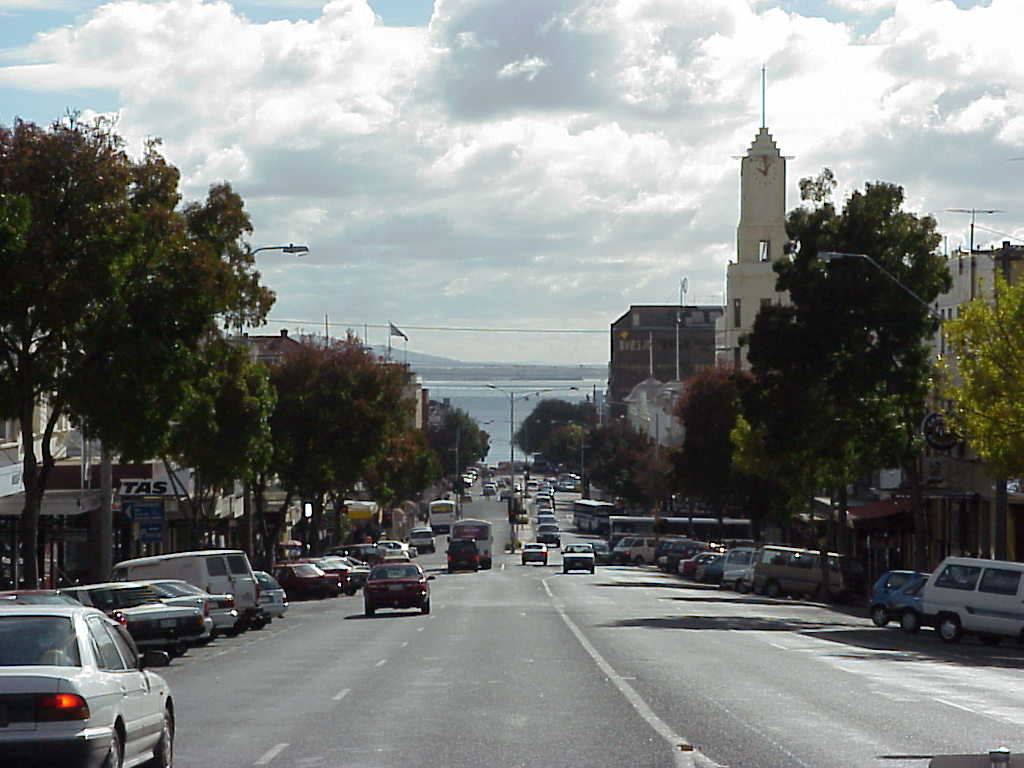
Corio Bay from Moorabool Street, Geelong

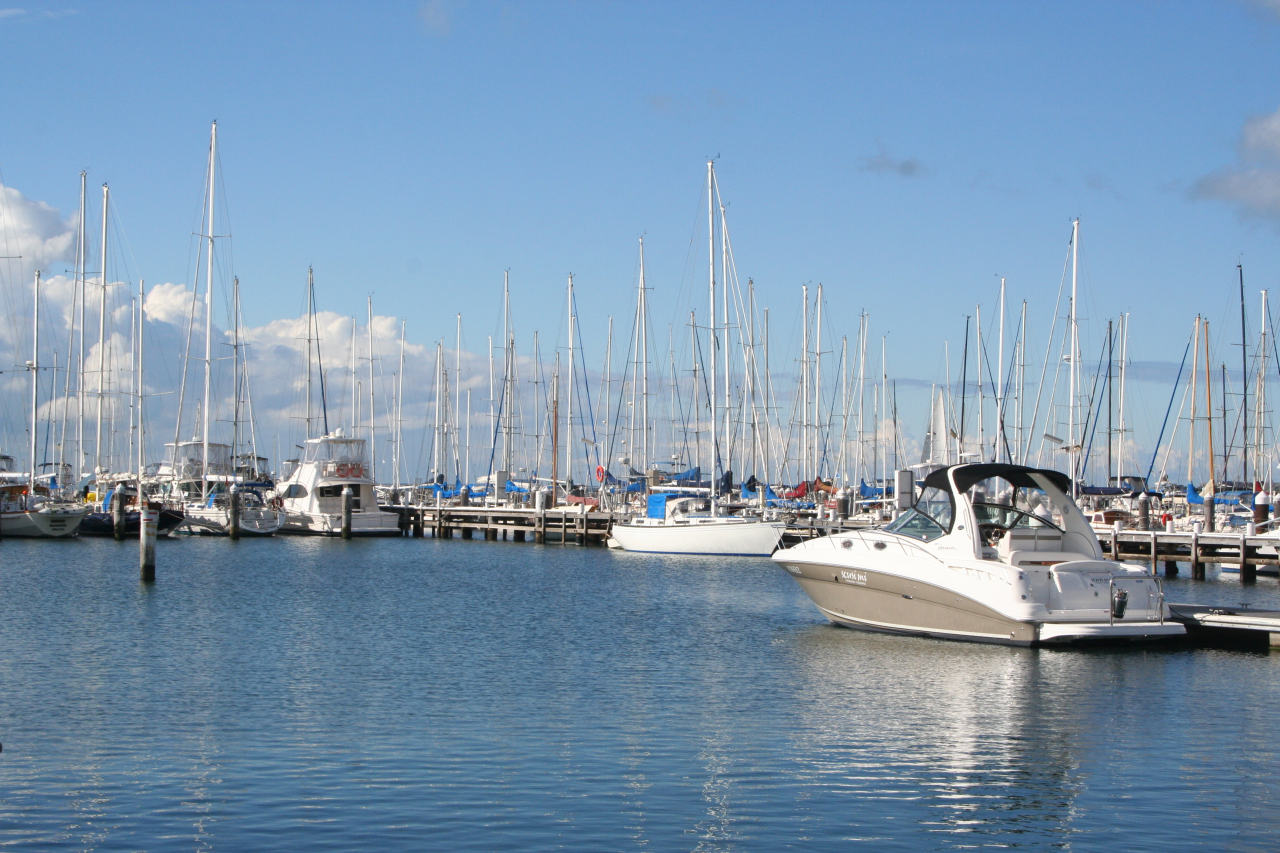
Bay City Marina
