= List of places of worship in the City of Greater Geelong =

This is a list of places of worship in the City of Greater Geelong, a local government area in the state of Victoria, Australia. The list includes active and former churches and other religious buildings representing a variety of Christian denominations and other faiths.

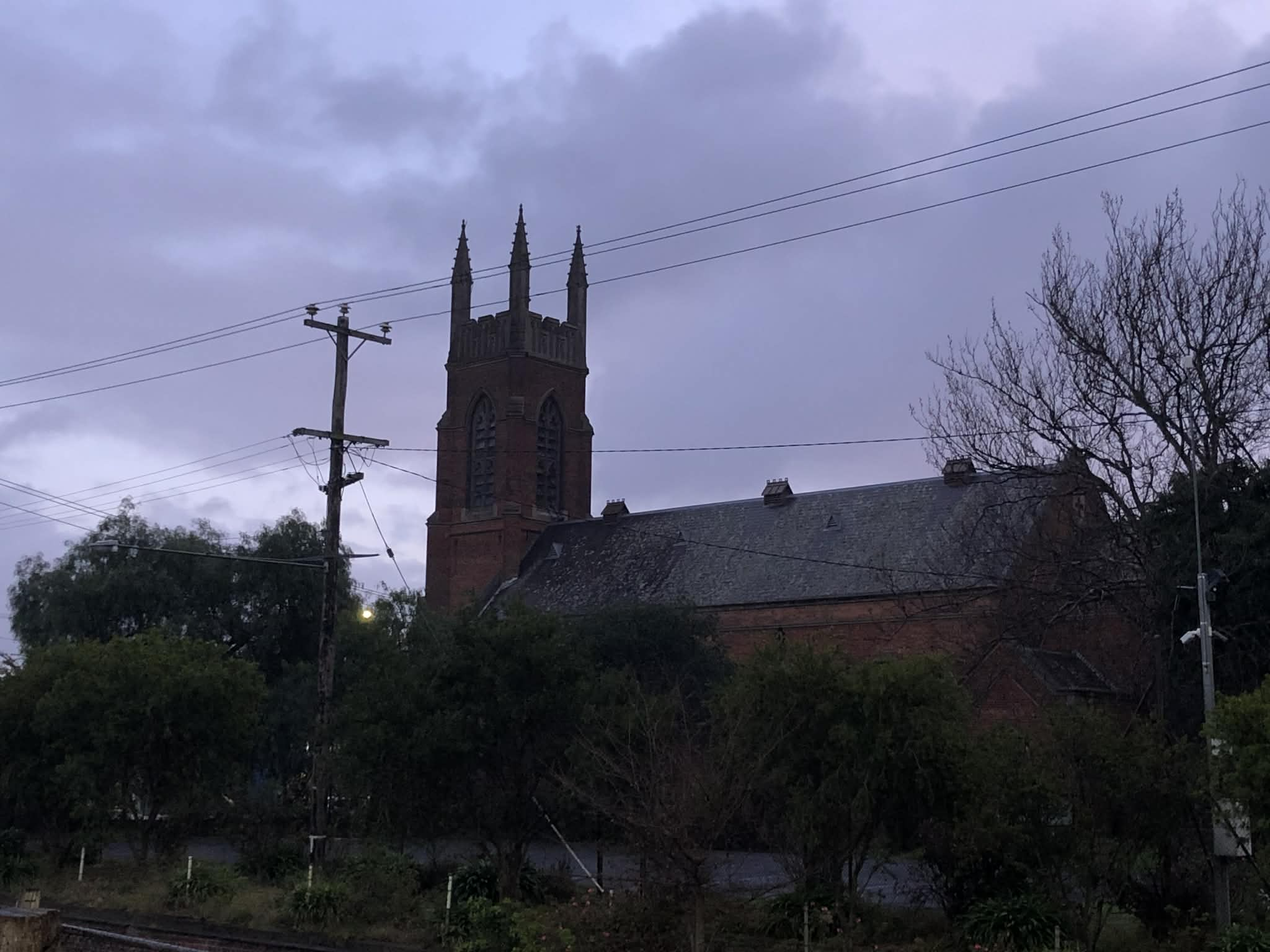
St Paul's Anglican Church, Geelong

== Heritage listing status ==
| Style | Status |
|---|---|
| Yes | Listed on the Victorian Heritage Register |
| – | Not listed |

== Current places of worship ==
Current places of worship
| Name | Image | Location | Denomination/ Affiliation | Heritage listing | Notes | Refs |
|---|---|---|---|---|---|---|
| St Brigid's Church | | Anakie; 37.885061°S 144.257390°E | Catholic | – | | |
| St Paul's Anglican Church | | Geelong; 38.14262°S 144.35388°E | Anglican | Yes | | |
| St John's Lutheran Church | | Geelong; 38.15385°S 144.36104°E | Lutheran (formerly Presbyterian) | Yes | | |
| All Saints' Anglican Church | | Newtown; 38.1529973°S 144.3397600°E | Anglican | Yes | | |
| Geelong Russian Orthodox Church | | Bell Park; 38.11268°S 144.33506°E | Russian Orthodox | – | | |
| Christ Church | | Geelong; 38.1532°S 144.3586°E | Anglican | Yes | | |
| Geelong Hungarian Seventh-day Adventist Church | | Norlane; 38.08627°S 144.34564°E | Seventh-day Adventist | – | | |
| Geelong Ukrainian Orthodox Church | | Bell Park; 38.11481°S 144.33223°E | Ukrainian Orthodox | – | | |
| Noble Street Uniting Church | | Newtown; 38°09′16″S 144°20′55″E | Uniting (formerly Methodist) | Yes | | |
| St John the Baptist Macedonian Orthodox Church | | Batesford; 38.096418°S 144.304240°E | Macedonian Orthodox | – | | |
| St Mary's Basilica | | Geelong; 38°09′10″S 144°21′38″E | Catholic | Yes | | |
| St Nicholas Serbian Orthodox Church | | Bell Park; 38.11773°S 144.33143°E | Serbian Orthodox | – | | |
| St David's Uniting Church | | Newtown; 38°9′2″S 144°20′26.9″E | Uniting (formerly Presbyterian) | Yes | | |
| St John's Anglican Church | | Highton; 38.172778°S 144.318715°E | Anglican | – | | |
| Holy Trinity Anglican Church, Lara | | Lara; 38.017924°S 144.404027°E | Anglican | Yes | | |
| St Andrew's Anglican Church, Corio | | Corio; 38.075337°S 144.359149°E | Anglican | – | | |
| St James' Anglican Church, Drysdale | | Drysdale; 38.169851°S 144.573499°E | Anglican | Yes | | |
| Holy Spirit Catholic Church, Manifold Heights | | Manifold Heights; 38.135087°S 144.334799°E | Catholic | Yes | | |
| St Peter's Anglican Church, Ocean Grove | | Ocean Grove; 38.264168°S 144.524561°E | Anglican | Yes | | |
| All Saints' Anglican Church, Barwon Heads | | Barwon Heads; 38.280178°S 144.491507°E | Anglican | Yes | | |
| St Mark's Anglican Church, Leopold | | Leopold; 38.187873°S 144.461148°E | Anglican | Yes | | |
| St Cuthbert's Anglican Church, Grovedale | | Grovedale; 38.207793°S 144.328157°E | Anglican | – | | |
| Chapel of All Saints, Geelong Grammar School | | Corio (Geelong Grammar School); 38.06965°S 144.39918°E | Anglican | Yes | | |
| St Stephen's Anglican Church, Belmont | | Belmont; 38.171786°S 144.342736°E | Anglican | – | | |
| St Matthew's Anglican Church, East Geelong | | East Geelong; 38.158115°S 144.373080°E | Anglican | Yes | | |
| St Alban's Anglican Church, Herne Hill | | Herne Hill; 38.129336°S 144.325094°E | Anglican | – | | |
| St Barnabas' Anglican Church, Newcomb | | Newcomb; 38.168549°S 144.392201°E | Anglican | – | | |
| Church of St Peter and St Paul, Geelong | | Geelong; 38.141210°S 144.355971°E | Catholic | Yes | | |
| St Paul's Anglican Church, Whittington (City on a Hill, Whittington) | | Whittington; 38.180957°S 144.389741°E | Anglican | – | | |
| Nazareth Catholic Church | | Grovedale; 38.202915°S 144.329845°E | Catholic | – | | |
| St Paul's Lutheran Church | | Grovedale; 38.208051°S 144.339673°E | Lutheran | Yes | | |
| Grovedale Uniting Church | | Grovedale; 38.205647°S 144.340946°E | Uniting (formerly Methodist) | Yes | | |
| Grovedale Baptist Church | | Grovedale; 38.201551°S 144.331072°E | Baptist | – | | |
| St Luke's Uniting Church | | Highton; 38.168843°S 144.310447°E | Uniting (formerly Methodist) | Yes | | |
| Belmont Uniting Church | | Belmont; 38.174081°S 144.341695°E | Uniting (formerly Methodist) | – | | |
| South Valley Baptist Church | | Highton; 38.195833°S 144.316390°E | Baptist | – | | |
| St Bernard's Catholic Church | | Belmont; 38.185642°S 144.324190°E | Catholic | – | | |
| Belmont Baptist Church | | Belmont; 38.170993°S 144.343494°E | Baptist | – | | |
| St Alban's Uniting Church, St Albans Park | | St Albans Park; 38.183918°S 144.388666°E | Uniting (formerly Methodist) | Yes | | |
| East Geelong Uniting Church | | East Geelong; 38.167355°S 144.383811°E | Uniting | – | | |
| St Andrew's Uniting Church | | Geelong; 38.152977°S 144.368635°E | Uniting (formerly Presbyterian) | – | | |
| Geelong Christian Reformed Church | | Geelong West; 38.145832°S 144.347035°E | Christian Reformed (formerly Methodist) | Yes | | |
| Geelong Reformed Presbyterian Church | | Geelong; 38.146928°S 144.3549041°E | Reformed Presbyterian | Yes | | |
| Hillsong Church, Geelong | | Geelong West; 38.141168°S 144.348454°E | Charismatic (formerly Methodist, then Uniting) | Yes | | |
| Geelong Mosque | | Manifold Heights; 38.133847°S 144.333976°E | Islam (formerly Methodist, then Uniting) | Yes | | |
| Manifold Heights Baptist Church | | Manifold Heights; 38.138914°S 144.336300°E | Baptist | – | | |
| Aberdeen Street Baptist Church | | Newtown; 38.147518°S 144.351318°E | Baptist | Yes | | |
| Geelong Seventh-day Adventist Church | | Geelong; 38.151401°S 144.354108°E | Seventh-day Adventist | – | | |
| Geelong Church of Christ | | Geelong; 38.150307°S 144.352528°E | Church of Christ | Yes | | |
| Geelong West Presbyterian Church | | Geelong West; 38.138185°S 144.348305°E | Presbyterian | – | | |
| Western Heights Uniting Church | | Herne Hill; 38.132343°S 144.326560°E | Uniting | – | | |
| Geelong New Apostolic Church | | Geelong West; 38.134453°S 144.340688°E | New Apostolic Church | – | | |
| St John the Evangelist Catholic Church, Rippleside | | Rippleside; 38.122713°S 144.355996°E | Catholic | – | | |
| Our Redeemer Lutheran Church | | Hamlyn Heights; 38.123795°S 144.336254°E | Lutheran | – | | |
| Our Lady of Protection Ukrainian Catholic Church | | Bell Park; 38.114100°S 144.331834°E | Catholic | – | | |
| St Anthony Croatian Catholic Church | | Bell Park; 38.114511°S 144.336899°E | Catholic | – | | |
| Geelong Church of Jesus Christ of Latter-day Saints | | Bell Post Hill; 38.102154°S 144.330434°E | Church of Jesus Christ of Latter-day Saints | – | | |
| Panagia Gorgoepikoos Monastery | | Lovely Banks; 38.081816°S 144.327312°E | Greek Orthodox | – | | |
| Geelong Greek Orthodox Church | | Hamlyn Heights; 38.116943°S 144.329932°E | Greek Orthodox | – | | |
| Holy Family Catholic Church | | Bell Park; 38.110705°S 144.338458°E | Catholic | – | | |
| Kardinia Church | | Bell Post Hill; 38.114210°S 144.330093°E | Church of Christ | – | | |
| St Thomas Aquinas' Catholic Church, Norlane | | Norlane; 38.090456°S 144.358861°E | Catholic | – | | |
| Cloverdale Baptist Community Church | | Corio; 38.071453°S 144.341296°E | Baptist | – | | |
| Geelong One in Christ Church | | Lovely Banks; 38.071160°S 144.330719°E | Charismatic | – | | |
| St Anthony of Padua Catholic Church | | Lara; 38.015023°S 144.389697°E | Catholic | – | | |
| Lara Uniting Church | | Lara; 38.022307°S 144.396845°E | Uniting (formerly Methodist) | Yes | | |
| Lifeway Christian Church | | Lara; 38.017673°S 144.405884°E | Baptist | – | | |
| Anakie Presbyterian Church | | Anakie; 37.922109°S 144.258729°E | Presbyterian | Yes | | |
| Geelong Presbyterian Church of Eastern Australia | | Newcomb; 38.163814°S 144.403818°E | Presbyterian Church of Eastern Australia | – | | |
| Lumen Christi Catholic Church | | Leopold; 38.182317°S 144.466276°E | Catholic | – | | |
| Leopold Uniting Church | | Leopold; 38.190577°S 144.468299°E | Uniting (formerly Methodist) | – | | |
| St Thomas' Catholic Church, Drysdale | | Drysdale; 38.187989°S 144.556052°E | Catholic | – | | |
| Drysdale Uniting Church | | Drysdale; 38.173650°S 144.569483°E | Uniting (formerly Methodist) | Yes | | |
| St John's Anglican Church, Portarlington | | Portarlington; 38.116641°S 144.654072°E | Anglican | Yes | | |
| St Patrick's Catholic Church, Portarlington | | Portarlington; 38.116914°S 144.650620°E | Catholic | Yes | | |
| St Andrew's Uniting Church, Portarlington | | Portarlington; 38.115239°S 144.657002°E | Uniting (formerly Presbyterian) | – | | |
| St Paul's Anglican Church, St Leonards | | St Leonards; 38.172230°S 144.717463°E | Anglican | Yes | | |
| Sts Philip and James Catholic Church | | St Leonards; 38.171508°S 144.715615°E | Catholic | – | | |
| Bellarine Revival Centre | | Newcomb; 38.172401°S 144.399587°E | Revival Centres International | – | | |
| One Hope Baptist Church, Moolap | | Moolap; 38.181146°S 144.427418°E | Baptist | – | | |
| Barrabool Hills Baptist Church | | Highton; 38.160771°S 144.307173°E | Baptist | – | | |
| Geelong Gateway Church | | Moolap; 38.181787°S 144.422267°E | Assemblies of God | – | | |
| Geelong Vineyard Church | | Geelong; 38.149054°S 144.366263°E | Evangelical | – | | |
| Wesley Uniting Church | | Geelong; 38.150701°S 144.361410°E | Uniting (formerly Methodist) | Yes | | |
| The Wave Baptist Church | | Ocean Grove; 38.258735°S 144.507625°E | Baptist | – | | |
| Ocean Grove Uniting Church | | Ocean Grove; 38.266686°S 144.527098°E | Uniting (formerly Methodist) | Yes | | |
| Holy Family Catholic Church, Barwon Heads | | Barwon Heads; 38.276961°S 144.492163°E | Catholic | Yes | | |
| Barwon Heads Uniting Church | | Barwon Heads; 38.279312°S 144.491507°E | Uniting (formerly Methodist & Congregational) | Yes | | |
| Wat Samphanthawong | | Lara; 38.052961°S 144.349451°E | Buddhism | – | | |
| Geelong Shiv Temple | | Marshall; 38.200525°S 144.362598°E | Hinduism | – | | |
| Geelong Gurudwara Sahib | | Lovely Banks; 38.070672°S 144.324061°E | Sikhism | – | | |
| St Joseph's College Chapel | | Newtown; 38.150396°S 144.331900°E | Catholic | Yes | | |
| Sacred Heart College Chapel | | Newtown; 38.148702°S 144.339267°E | Catholic | Yes | | |
| Geelong College Chapel | | Newtown; 38.150663°S 144.340182°E | Uniting (formerly Presbyterian) | – | | |
| Clonard College Chapel | | Herne Hill; 38.130083°S 144.330234°E | Catholic | – | | |
| St Sebastian's Syro-Malabar Church | | East Geelong; 38.163750°S 144.373444°E | Syro-Malabar Church | – | | |
| Deakin University Chapel (formerly St John's Catholic Church, Sutherlands Creek) | | Waurn Ponds; 38.198880°S 144.296215°E | Non-denominational (formerly Catholic) | Yes | | |
| Deakin University Musalla | | Waurn Ponds; 38.199657°S 144.296384°E | Islam | – | | |
| Christian College Chapel | | Highton; 38.185994°S 144.311463°E | Catholic | – | | |
| Cobbin Farm Chapel (formerly St Cuthbert's Anglican Church, Marshall) | | Grovedale; 38.193068°S 144.329914°E | Non-denominational (formerly Anglican) | – | | |

== Former places of worship ==
Former places of worship
| Name | Image | Location | Denomination/ Affiliation | Heritage listing | Notes | Refs |
|---|---|---|---|---|---|---|
| St Giles' Presbyterian Church | | Geelong; 38.14993°S 144.35636°E | Presbyterian | Yes | | |
| Fenwick Street Baptist Church | | Geelong; 38.14732°S 144.35473°E | Baptist | Yes | | |
| Bond Street (Primitive) Methodist Church | | Newtown; 38.156394°S 144.348252°E | Methodist | Non-existant | | |
| Geelong Congregational (Independent) Church (old and new) | | Geelong; 38.149179°S 144.356553°E | Congregationalist | Non-existant (both) | | |
| Geelong Congregational (Independent) Church (original) | | Geelong; 38.152872°S 144.357133°E | Congregationalist | Yes | | |
| Geelong Free Presbyterian (Gaelic) Church | | Geelong; 38.150023°S 144.352520°E | Presbyterian | Yes | | |
| Bellarine Methodist Church | | Bellarine; 38.134699°S 144.620784°E | Methodist | Yes | | |
| Portarlington Methodist Church | | Portarlington; 38.117863°S 144.651178°E | Methodist | Yes | | |
| Batesford Presbyterian Church | | Batesford; 38.091340°S 144.281886°E | Presbyterian | Yes | | |
| Ceres Methodist Church | | Ceres; 38.170219°S 144.276134°E | Methodist | Yes | | |
| Wallington Uniting Church | | Wallington; 38.238814°S 144.502010°E | Uniting (formerly Methodist) | Yes | | |
| Geelong Synagogue | | Geelong; 38.1545°S 144.3607°E | Judaism | Yes | | |
| Church of the Redeemer | | Anakie; 37.896887°S 144.254053°E | Anglican | – | | |
| St Barnabas' Anglican Church, Marcus Hill | | Marcus Hill; 38.242935°S 144.572650°E | Anglican | – | | |
| Connewarre Uniting Church | | Connewarre; 38.259171°S 144.424779°E | Uniting (formerly Methodist Church) | – | | |
| St Francis Xavier Catholic Church, Leopold | | Leopold; 38.179308°S 144.497133°E | Catholic | Yes | | |
| St Peter's Anglican Church, Newtown | | Newtown; 38.158411°S 144.342241°E | Anglican | – | | |
| St Paul's Presbyterian Church, Little River | | Little River; 37.960100°S 144.488023°E | Presbyterian | – | | |
| St Thomas' Catholic Church, Drysdale (former) | | Drysdale; 38.172938°S 144.567826°E | Catholic | Yes | | |
| Ryrie Street Presbyterian Church | | Geelong; 38.14803°S 144.35621°E | Presbyterian | – | | |
| Trinity Lutheran Church | | Grovedale; 38.206779°S 144.340477°E | Lutheran | Non-existant | | |

== See also ==
- List of places of worship in the City of Ballarat
- List of places of worship in the City of Greater Bendigo
- List of places of worship in Surf Coast Shire
- List of places of worship in Golden Plains Shire
