= List of heritage listed buildings in Geelong =

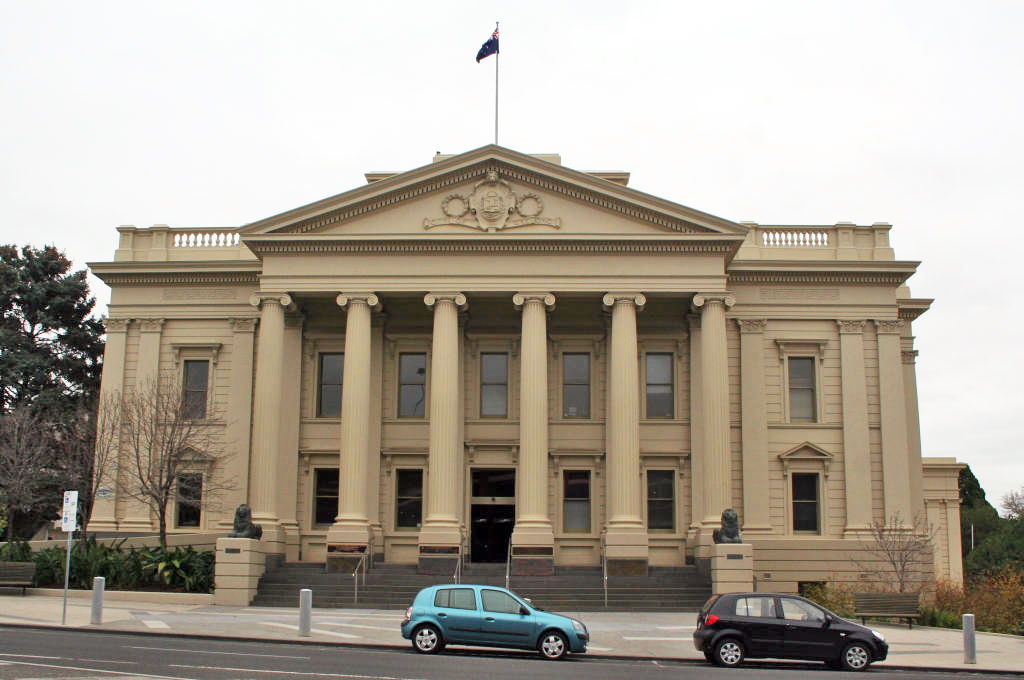
Geelong City Hall

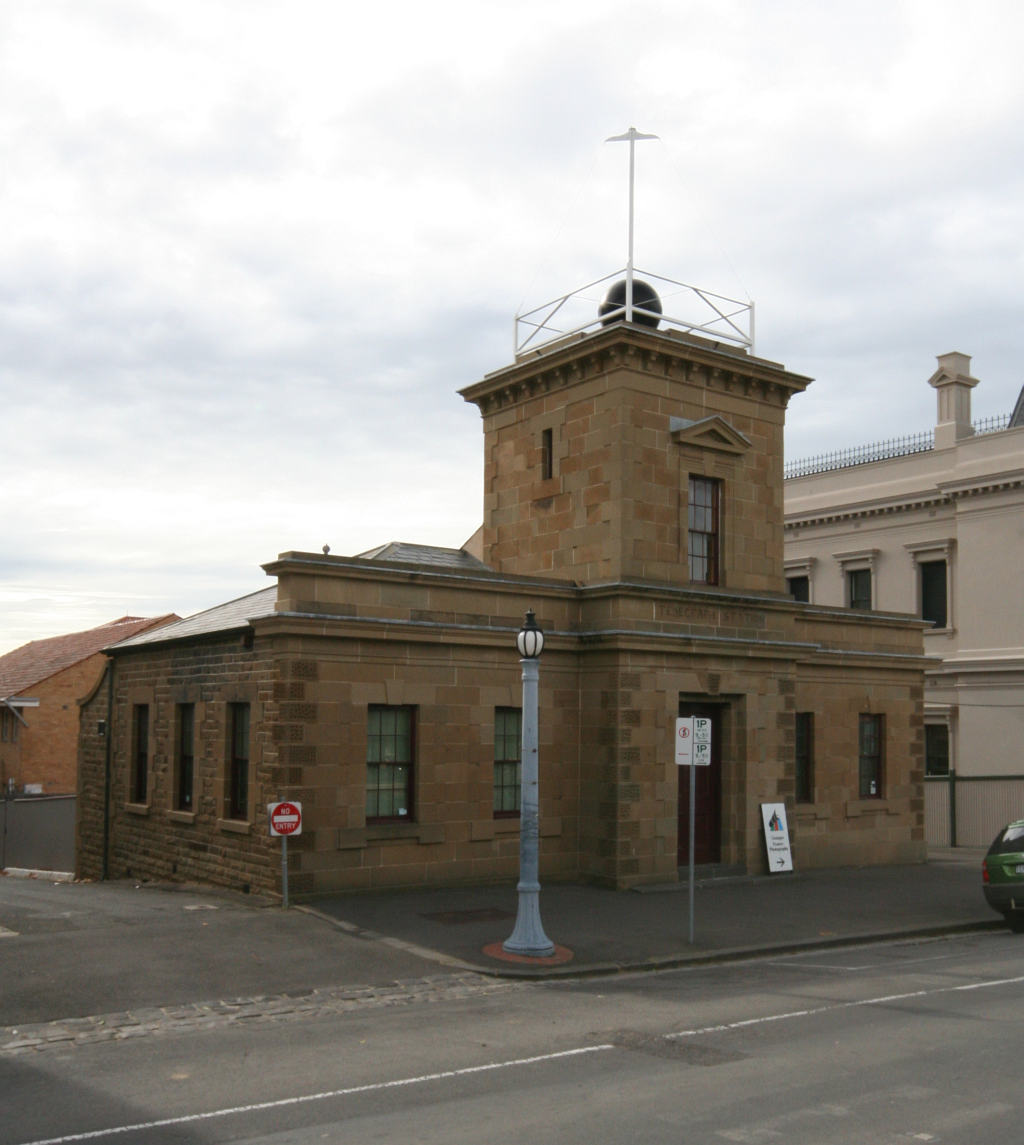
Geelong Telegraph Station on Ryrie Street

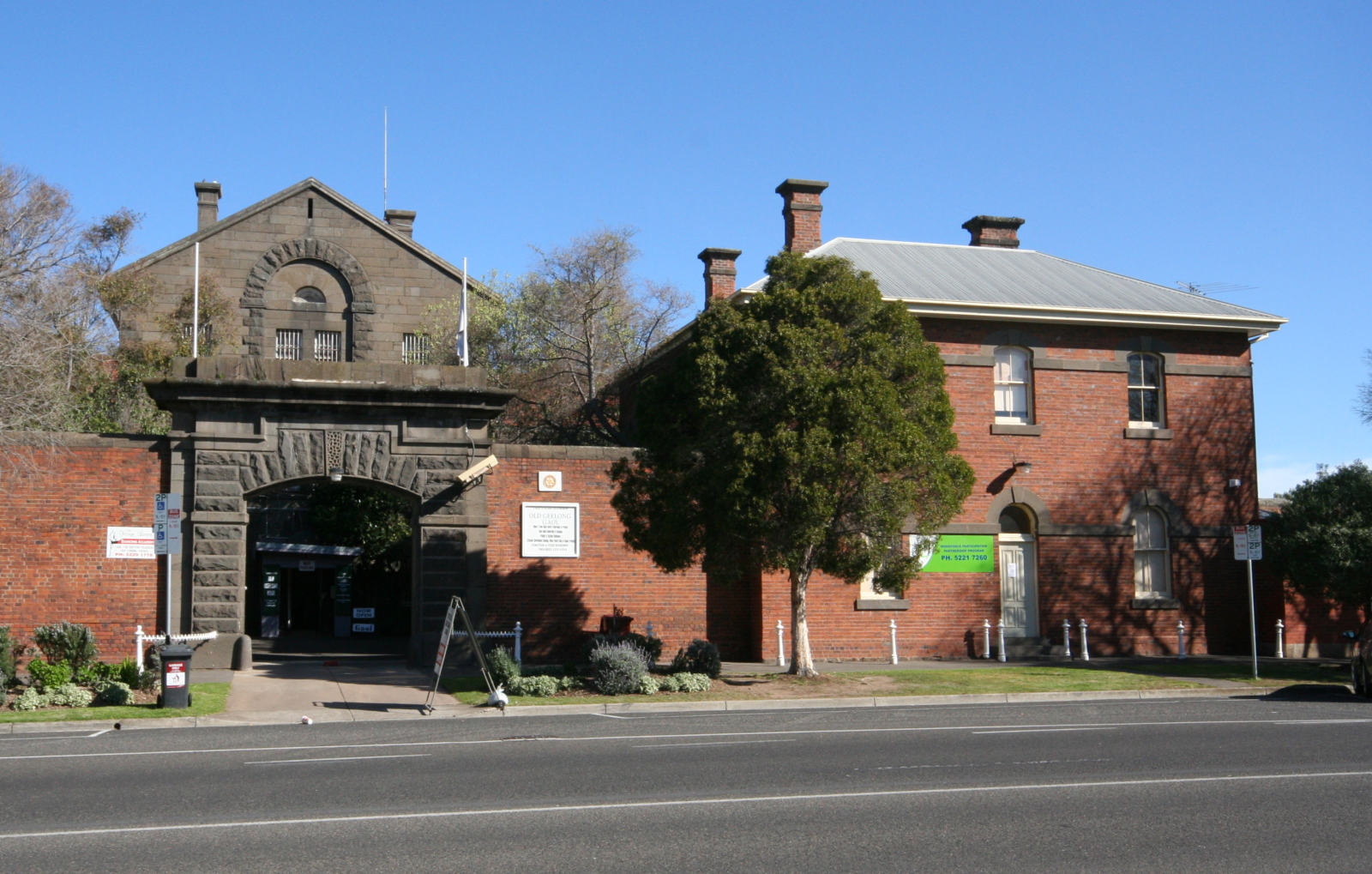
HM Prison Geelong

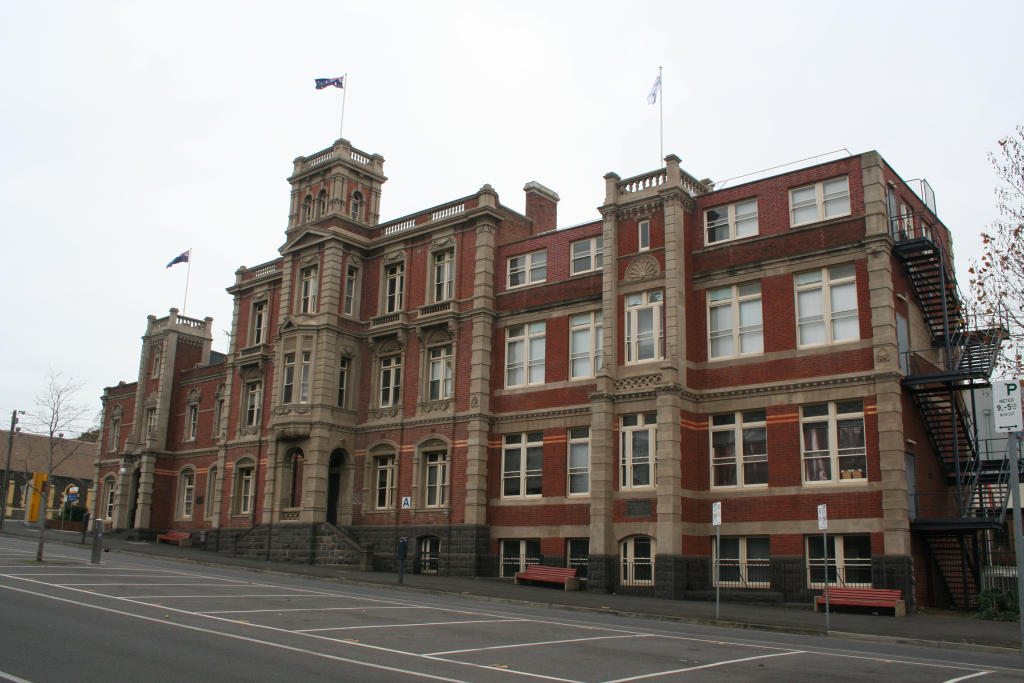
Gordon Institute of TAFE, Fenwick Street

The former George and Dragon hotel (now a Restaurant)

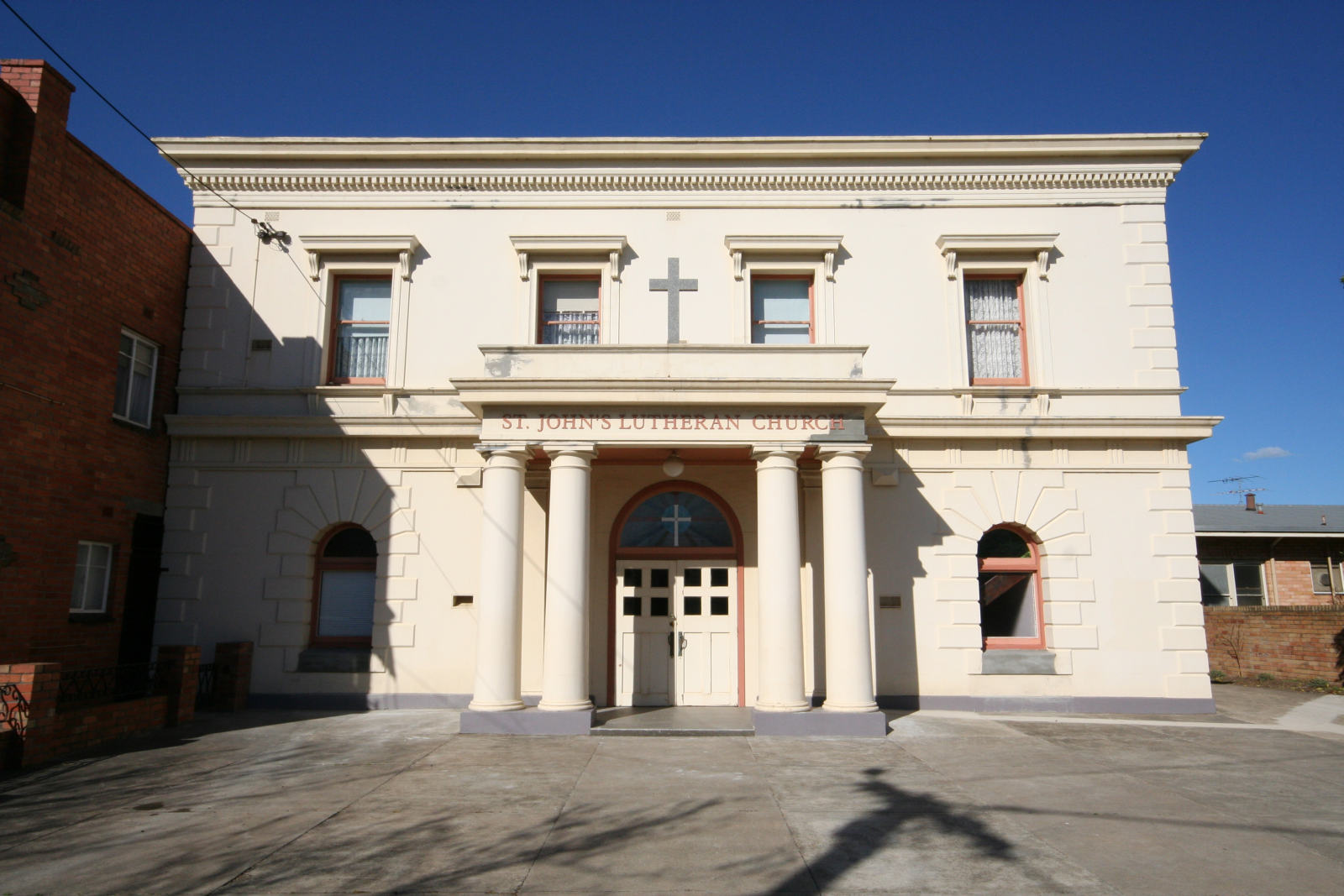
St John's Lutheran Church

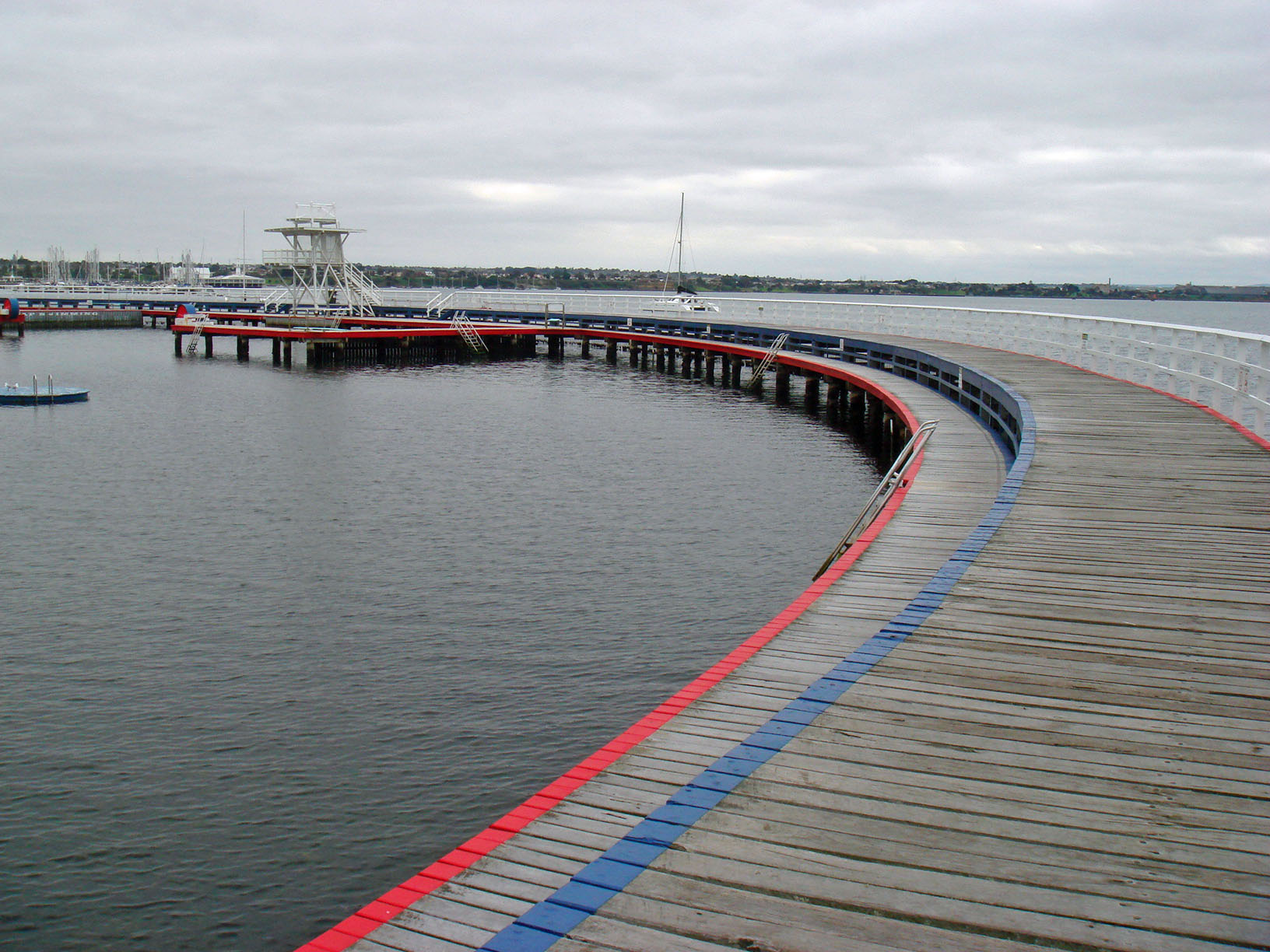
Eastern Beach boardwalk and swimming enclosure

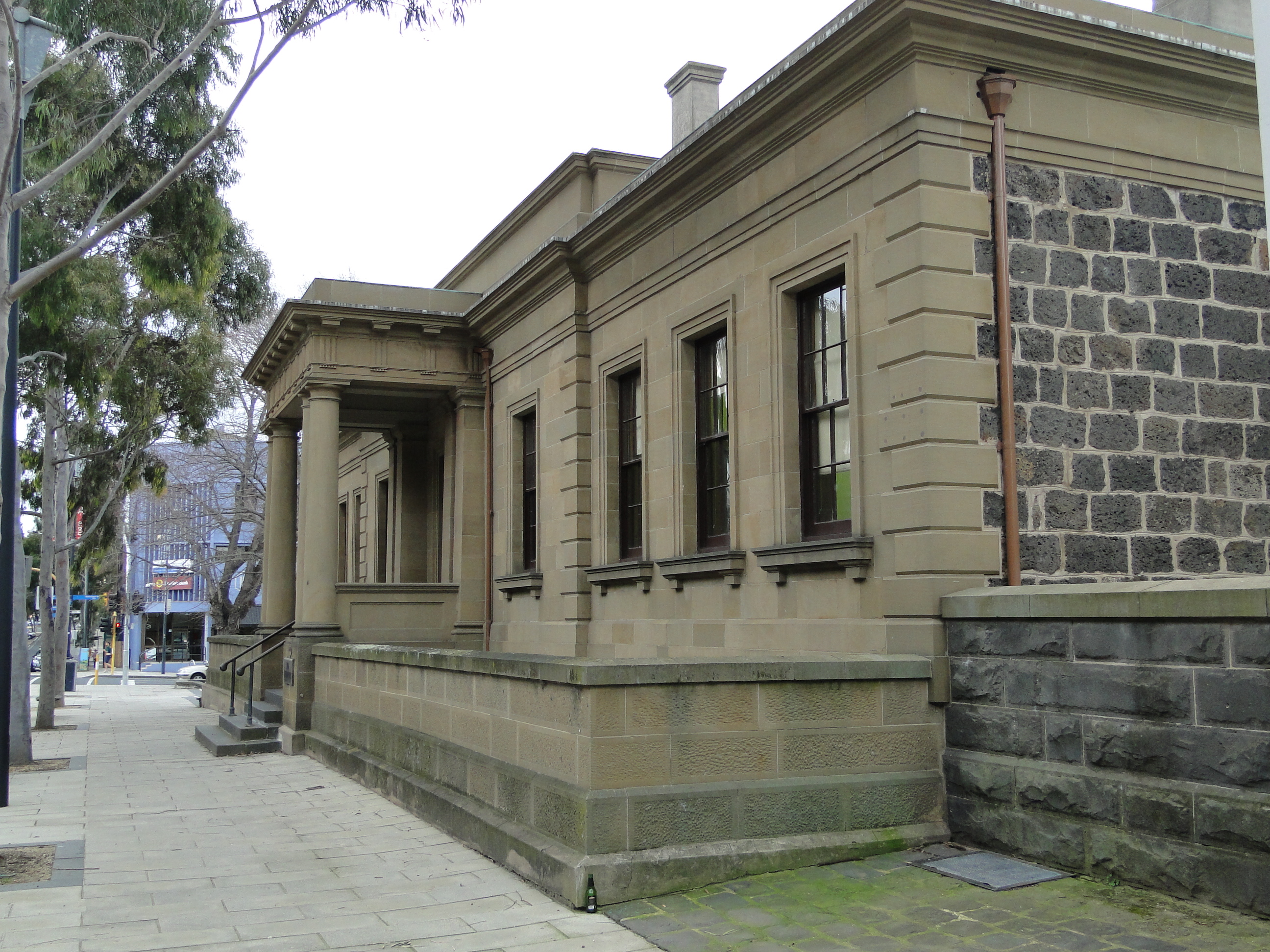
Geelong Customs House

This is a list of heritage-listed buildings in Geelong, Australia, which have been listed on the Victorian Heritage Register, which provides the highest level of protection afforded to a building in the state of Victoria. This article only includes buildings and sites in the Geelong city centre; historic buildings and sites in suburbs and surrounding towns are listed in their respective articles.

Name	Address	Year constructed	Reference
Alexander Miller Memorial Homes (McKillop Street)	73 McKillop Street	1919	
Alexander Miller Memorial Homes (Park Street)	22A Park Street	1922–24	
Alexander Miller Memorial Homes (Ryrie Street)	324–332 Ryrie Street	1913–14	
ANZ Bank Building (Interior)	2 Malop Street	1859–60	
Ashby Presbytery of St Peter and St Paul	1 Malone Street	1914–15	
Austin Hall and Terrace Complex	217A Yarra Street	1887 (cottages); 1888 (hall and terrace)	
Baptist Church and Sunday School	14 Fenwick Street	1868	
Bay View Hotel	2–4 Mercer Street	1853–54	
Belcher Drinking Fountain	Malop Street	1874	
Belleville	350 Ryrie Street	1870–71	
Brown Brothers Store	17–19 Mercer Street	1854	
Christ Church	275 Moorabool Street	1847	
Church of Christ	275 Latrobe Terrace	1858	
Church of St Peter and St Paul	57–63 Mercer Street and 5 Malone Street	1864–66	
Corio Villa	56–58 Eastern Beach Road	1856	
Dennys Lascelles Wool Stores	26 Moorabool Street	1872	
Ducker's Auction Rooms	77–79 Little Malop Street	1877	
Eastern Beach Bathing Complex and Reserve	1 Ritchie Boulevard	1928	
ES&A Bank	9–11 Malop Street	1859–60	
Eudoxus	34 Fenwick Street	1854–55	
Fernshaw	4 Western Beach	1876	
Former Gaelic Church and Schoolhouse	271 Latrobe Terrace	1854	
The Geelong Club	74 Brougham Street	1888–89	
Geelong Customs House	57 Brougham Street	1855–56	
Geelong railway station	1 Railway Terrace	1877	
Geelong Synagogue	74–78 McKillop Street	1861	
Geelong Telegraph Station	83A Ryrie Street	1857–58	
Geelong City Hall	30 Gheringhap Street	1855	
Geelong Wool Exchange	44 Corio Street	1927–28	
George and Dragon Hotel	310 Moorabool Street	1855	
Golden Age Hotel	2–4 Gheringhap Street	1854	
Gordon Technical College	6 Fenwick Street	1887	
HM Prison Geelong	200–202 Myers Street	1864	
Johnstone Park	24–28 Gheringhap Street	1872	
Leyton and Rochford	224–226 Moorabool Street	1850c.	
Matthew Flinders Girls Secondary College	15 Myers Street	1856–57	
Merchiston Hall	2A Garden Street	1856	
Mt Zion Particular Baptist Church	10 Little Ryrie Street	1856	
Old Geelong Grammar School	55 Maud Street	1857–58	
Old Geelong Post Office	83 Ryrie Street	1889–90	
Railway Tunnel	Geelong–Warrnambool railway line	1874–75	
Sailors Rest Electric Sign	3 Moorabool Street	1926	
Scottish Chiefs Hotel	99 Corio Street	1848	
St George's Presbyterian Church, Geelong	13 Ryrie Street	1860	
St Giles Church and Free Church School	72–80 Gheringhap Street	1854 (school); 1861 (church)	
St John's Lutheran Church	165 Yarra Street	1841–42	
St. Mary of the Angels Basilica	136–148 Yarra Street	1854	
St Mary's Hall	162–190 Myers Street	1891–92	
St Paul's Anglican Church	175 Latrobe Terrace	1850-1863	
Strachan Murray and Shannon Wool Warehouses	95–97 Malop Street	1889	
Terminus Hotel	96 Mercer Street	1853–54	
Trustees Chambers	8 Malop Street	1857	
Wintergarden	51 McKillop Street	1853–54	
