= List of pubs in the City of Greater Geelong =

This is a list of pubs in the City of Greater Geelong, a local government area in the state of Victoria, Australia. The list includes active and former pubs/hotels.

== Heritage listing status ==
Style	Status
Yes	Listed on the Victorian Heritage Register
–	Not listed

== Active pubs ==
Active pubs
Name	Image	Location	Date of opening/license	Heritage listing	Notes	Refs
Phoenix Hotel (Red Lion Hotel) (Wool Exchange Hotel)		Geelong; 38.146192°S 144.361513°E		Yes		
The Inn (Bush Inn)		Geelong; 38.146098°S 144.360506°E		Yes		
Eureka Hotel		Geelong; 38.148163°S 144.359541°E		Yes		
Sir Charles Darling Hotel (Clare)		Geelong; 38.149691°S 144.364947°E		Yes		
Geelong Hotel (Corio Hotel) (Southey's Hotel) (Melbourne Club)		Geelong; 38.149415°S 144.362891°E		Yes		
The Sporting Globe (Preston's)		Geelong; 38.149468°S 144.361068°E		–		
Joker's (Prince Albert) (Criterion)		Geelong; 38.149761°S 144.362139°E		–		
National Hotel		Geelong; 38.150299°S 144.359612°E		Yes		
Carrington Hotel; Centra (Shakespeare) (Haymarket)		Geelong; 38.151962°S 144.361665°E		Yes		
Das Bierhaus (George and Dragon Hotel)		Geelong; 38.154249°S 144.357300°E		Yes		
Commun na Feinne (Commo) Hotel		Geelong; 38.157167°S 144.362147°E		–		
Elephant and Castle Hotel		Geelong; 38.156136°S 144.366568°E		Yes		
Barwon Club (Barwon Bridge)		South Geelong; 38.162882°S 144.353842°E		Yes		
Valley Inn Hotel (Factory) (Retreat)		South Geelong; 38.163221°S 144.358709°E		–		
The Deck (Golden Age Hotel)		Geelong; 38.143472°S 144.359377°E		Yes		
Sir Charles Hotham Hotel (Cavendish)		Geelong; 38.143658°S 144.357009°E		Yes		
Sawyers' Arms Tavern		Newtown; 38.154397°S 144.350784°E		Yes		
Clarendon Hotel (Cricket Club Hotel)		Newtown; 38.156019°S 144.350786°E		–		
Cremorne Hotel		Newtown; 38.156875°S 144.345454°E		Yes		
Lord of the Isles (Goldiggers' Arms)		Newtown; 38.160241°S 144.349606°E		–		
Saleyards Hotel (Geelong and Ballarat Hotel)		Geelong West; 38.131592°S 144.344454°E		Yes		
Telegraph Hotel		Geelong West; 38.132314°S 144.350123°E		–		
Petrel Hotel		Geelong West; 38.136777°S 144.348865°E		–		
Queen of the West Hotel (Queen of the South Hotel)		Geelong West; 38.138873°S 144.348860°E		Yes		
St George Workers' Club (St George Hotel)		Geelong West; 38.142554°S 144.348159°E		Yes		
Murphy's (Irish Murphys) (Argyle)		Geelong West; 38.146902°S 144.349767°E		Yes		
Great Western Hotel		Newtown; 38.145528°S 144.335247°E		Yes		
Gold Diggers' Arms Hotel		Newtown; 38.147510°S 144.342753°E		Yes		
Belmont Hotel (Racecourse Hotel)		Belmont; 38.171383°S 144.346871°E		–		
Grovedale Hotel (German Town Hotel)		Grovedale; 38.202976°S 144.341282°E		–		
Breakwater Hotel (All Nations Hotel)		Breakwater; 38.181372°S 144.367200°E		–		
Fyansford Hotel		Fyansford; 38.142017°S 144.309753°E	1854	Yes		

== Former pubs ==
Former pubs
Name	Image	Location	Date of opening/license	Heritage listing	Notes	Refs
Scottish Chiefs Hotel (Watchmarker's Arms Hotel)		Geelong; 38.147044°S 144.364458°E		Yes		
Mack's Hotel (Woolpack Hotel)		Geelong; 38.145705°S 144.362831°E		Non-existant		
Steampacket Hotel		Geelong; 38.146374°S 144.363740°E		Non-existant		
British Hotel		Geelong; 38.146263°S 144.361923°E		Non-existant		
Thistle Inn		Geelong; 38.146625°S 144.363147°E		Non-existant		
Corio Hotel (Three Tuns Hotel)		Geelong; 38.146750°S 144.363579°E		Non-existant		
Royal Hotel		Geelong; 38.146916°S 144.363952°E		Non-existant		
Joiners' Arms Hotel (Carrier's Arms Hotel)		Geelong; 38.146491°S 144.361811°E		Non-existant		
Old House at Home Hotel		Geelong; 38.146563°S 144.362104°E		Non-existant		
Commercial Hotel (Shamrock Hotel)		Geelong; 38.146706°S 144.362588°E		Non-existant		
Daniel O'Connell Inn (Ship Inn) (Crown Inn)		Geelong; 38.146977°S 144.363449°E		Non-existant		
Royal Mail Hotel (Duke of Edinburgh Hotel) (Pembroke's) (Bradshaw's)		Geelong; 38.147068°S 144.363903°E		Yes		
Belle Vue Hotel (Bay View Hotel) (Ritz Flats)		Geelong; 38.147650°S 144.366011°E		Yes		
Sir Charles Hotham Hotel		Geelong; 38.147949°S 144.366345°E		Non-existant		
Woolpack (Stag and Hounds Hotel) (Bradford Hotel)		Geelong; 38.146525°S 144.360864°E		Non-existant		
Harp (of Erin) Hotel (Artillery Hotel) (Galatea Hotel) (Lincoln Hotel) (Cosmopolitan Hotel)		Geelong; 38.146758°S 144.360763°E		Non-existant		
Britannia Hotel (Limerick Castle Hotel)		Geelong; 38.147475°S 144.363692°E		Non-existant		
Carlton Hotel (Union Inn) (Union Club Hotel)		Geelong; 38.146716°S 144.359505°E		Yes		
Victoria Hotel		Geelong; 38.147136°S 144.361055°E		Non-existant		
Shamrock Inn		Geelong; 38.147719°S 144.363127°E		Non-existant		
Freemason's Tavern		Geelong; 38.148246°S 144.364851°E		Yes		
Builder's Arms Hotel (Grosvenor House)		Geelong; 38.148413°S 144.365450°E		Non-existant		
Lord Nelson Hotel (Nelson Family Hotel) (Nelson Hotel) (Malt Shovel (Taphouse))		Geelong; 38.148560°S 144.366044°E		Yes		
Black Bull Inn (Orient Hotel and Shade's Dining Rooms)		Geelong; 38.147018°S 144.359254°E		Non-existant		
Turf Club Hotel		Geelong; 38.147203°S 144.359925°E		Non-existant		
Corio Hotel		Geelong; 38.148188°S 144.363439°E		Non-existant		
Royal Hotel		Geelong; 38.148514°S 144.364502°E		Non-existant		
Fitzroy (Arms) Hotel (Manchester Arms Hotel) (Duke of York Hotel) (Exchange Hotel)		Geelong; 38.148700°S 144.365192°E		Non-existant		
Botanical Gardens Hotel (Gardens Hotel)		Geelong; 38.149025°S 144.366287°E		Non-existant		
Derby Arms Hotel		Geelong; 38.147967°S 144.359364°E		Non-existant		
Royal Exchange Hotel		Geelong; 38.148117°S 144.360118°E		Non-existant		
Sir William Wallace Hotel (1st) (Gamekeepers Hotel) (Clarendon Hotel)		Geelong; 38.148887°S 144.363082°E		Non-existant		
Rock of Cashel Inn (Derby Arms Hotel) (Albion Hotel)		Geelong; 38.148489°S 144.360741°E		Non-existant		
Turf Club Hotel (All Nations Hotel)		Geelong; 38.148623°S 144.361201°E		Non-existant		
Newmarket Hotel (New Market Hotel)		Geelong; 38.148710°S 144.361423°E		Non-existant		
Prince of Wales Hotel		Geelong; 38.148807°S 144.361767°E		Non-existant		
Corio Hotel		Geelong; 38.148892°S 144.362124°E		Non-existant		
Victory Hotel		Geelong; 38.148235°S 144.358909°E		Non-existant		
Olive Branch Hotel		Geelong; 38.148812°S 144.359767°E		Non-existant		
Royal Oak Hotel		Geelong; 38.148866°S 144.360264°E		Yes		
Queen's Head Hotel		Geelong; 38.148628°S 144.358099°E		Yes	Now "Khan's Curry Hut"	
Rising Sun Hotel		Geelong; 38.149039°S 144.358309°E		Non-existant		
Australian Inn (Australasian Hotel)		Geelong; 38.149206°S 144.358835°E		Non-existant		
Shamrock Hotel		Geelong; 38.149388°S 144.359452°E		Non-existant		
Scott's Hotel (Princess of Wales Hotel)		Geelong; 38.149659°S 144.360373°E		Non-existant		
White Hart House (Red Lion Inn)		Geelong; 38.150093°S 144.359176°E		Yes		
Good Woman Hotel (Caledonian Hotel)		Geelong; 38.149889°S 144.357445°E		Yes		
Star Hotel (Rising Sun Hotel)		Geelong; 38.150900°S 144.357896°E		Yes		
Brian Boru Hotel		Geelong; 38.151019°S 144.358806°E		Yes		
London Hotel		Geelong; 38.151169°S 144.359197°E		Non-existant		
Commodore Hotel (Waggon and Horses Hotel (Sic)) (Fire Brigade Hotel)		Geelong; 38.151500°S 144.360120°E		Non-existant		
Blue Posts Hotel		Geelong; 38.151679°S 144.361840°E		Non-existant		
Oddfellow's Inn (Odd Fellow's Arms Hotel)		Geelong; 38.151329°S 144.358103°E		Non-existant		
Farmer's Arms Hotel (Geelong and Melbourne Hotel) (Olney's Hotel) (Geelong Hotel)		Geelong; 38.151455°S 144.358574°E		Non-existant		
Haymarket Hotel		Geelong; 38.152243°S 144.358204°E		–		
Supreme Court Hotel		Geelong; 38.152568°S 144.362459°E		Non-existant		
Royal Charter Hotel		Geelong; 38.152318°S 144.361506°E		Non-existant		
Court House Hotel		Geelong; 38.153620°S 144.360934°E		Non-existant		
Rosemary Branch Hotel		Geelong; 38.155501°S 144.361522°E		Yes		
Portarlington Hotel		Geelong; 38.153151°S 144.366987°E		Non-existant		
Pivot Hotel		Geelong; 38.156699°S 144.366155°E		Non-existant		
Nelson's Victory Hotel		South Geelong; 38.161689°S 144.358665°E		Non-existant		
Bridge Inn (Farmer's Home Hotel)		South Geelong; 38.161957°S 144.354337°E		Non-existant		
Young Queen Hotel		South Geelong; 38.162770°S 144.353378°E		Non-existant		
Bay View Hotel (Western Hotel)		Geelong; 38.139464°S 144.354532°E		Yes		
Sydney Hotel		Geelong; 38.144676°S 144.357314°E		Non-existant		
Eagle Hotel		Geelong; 38.149088°S 144.371921°E		Non-existant		
Limerick Arms Hotel		Geelong; 38.149509°S 144.367936°E		Non-existant		
Punt Inn		Newtown; 38.149183°S 144.325800°E		Non-existant		
Fernery Hotel (Newtown Hotel) (Jeffery's)		Newtown; 38.149606°S 144.334439°E		Non-existant		
Eagle Hawk Inn		Newtown; 38.154145°S 144.321698°E		Non-existant		
Duke of Wellington Hotel (Wellington Inn)		Newtown; 38.152215°S 144.345874°E		Yes		
Warwick Castle Hotel (Warwick Arms Hotel) (Cotton's)		Newtown; 38.157384°S 144.349694°E		Non-existant		
Sportsman's Arms Hotel		Geelong West; 38.131301°S 144.341747°E		Non-existant		
Harp Inn		Geelong West; 38.133758°S 144.349806°E		Yes		
Ashby Hotel		Geelong West; 38.134176°S 144.344220°E		Non-existant		
Globe Inn		Geelong West; 38.135503°S 144.349135°E		Yes		
Crown Hotel		Geelong West; 38.137545°S 144.352182°E		Non-existant		
Ship Inn		Geelong West; 38.138238°S 144.348995°E		Non-existant		
City of Norwich Hotel (Hit or Miss Hotel) (Rock of Cashel Hotel)		Geelong West; 38.139409°S 144.351340°E		Non-existant		
Sir William Wallace Hotel (3rd)		Geelong West; 38.143535°S 144.350656°E		Non-existant		
Sir William Wallace Hotel (2nd) (Oxford Arms Hotel) (Rainbow Hotel)		Geelong West; 38.144625°S 144.350413°E		Non-existant		
Bunyip Hotel		Geelong West; 38.144848°S 144.350394°E		Non-existant		
Culloden Castle Hotel		Geelong West; 38.145139°S 144.352814°E		Yes		
Prince Arthur Inn		Geelong West; 38.145970°S 144.350201°E		Non-existant		
Shearers' Arms Hotel		Geelong West; 38.145283°S 144.336265°E		Yes		
Royal Museum Hotel (Museum Hotel)		Newtown; 38.147809°S 144.347293°E		Non-existant		
Garni Hotel		Newtown; 38.148375°S 144.351770°E		Non-existant		
Edinburgh Castle Hotel		Newtown; 38.148623°S 144.335170°E		Non-existant		
Kardinia Hotel		Highton; 38.167995°S 144.319362°E		Non-existant		
De la Ville Hotel (Edinburgh Castle Hotel) (De Ville Hotel)		Geelong; 38.152283°S 144.357702°E		–		
Borough Hotel		Belmont; 38.170956°S 144.346729°E		Non-existant		
Junction Hotel		Belmont; 38.168198°S 144.350334°E		Non-existant		
Black Swan Hotel (White Swan Hotel) (Swan Hotel)		Whittington; 38.172397°S 144.384034°E		Yes		
Plough Inn (Hunt Club Hotel)		Newcomb; 38.168835°S 144.386234°E		Non-existant		
Emu Hotel		Newcomb; 38.170220°S 144.391270°E		Non-existant		
Point Henry Hotel		Moolap; 38.136791°S 144.422712°E		Non-existant		
Moolap Hotel		Moolap; 38.178838°S 144.420525°E		Non-existant		
Glenmore Hotel (Glenmond Hotel)		Moolap; 38.162295°S 144.404970°E		Non-existant		
German Inn (Bay View Hotel) (Germantown Hotel)		Grovedale; 38.208379°S 144.339661°E		Non-existant		
Breakwater Hotel		Marshall; 38.191881°S 144.358068°E		Non-existant		
Racecourse Hotel		Marshall; 38.198150°S 144.362152°E		Non-existant		
Fountain of Friendship Hotel		Norlane; 38.091892°S 144.335560°E		Non-existant		
Corio Shire Hotel		Norlane; 38.098515°S 144.354593°E		Non-existant		
Ocean Child Hotel		North Geelong; 38.111601°S 144.352119°E		Non-existant		
Oriental Hotel (Nugget Hotel)		North Geelong; 38.122913°S 144.352513°E		Non-existant		
Swan Inn (Fyansford Hotel)		Fyansford; 38.140093°S 144.308066°E		Yes		
Greenwood's (Family) Hotel (Fairview Hotel)		Herne Hill; 38.137206°S 144.318294°E		Non-existant		
Balmoral Hotel		Fyansford; 38.141477°S 144.309764°E		Yes		
Junction Hotel (Keen's Hotel)		Fyansford; 38.138639°S 144.287886°E		Yes		
Terminus Hotel		Geelong; 38.143430°S 144.356224°E		Yes		
