= Kardinia =

Kardinia may refer to:

== Australia ==
=== Queensland ===
- Kardinia, Townsville, a heritage house

=== Victoria ===
- Kardinia Park in Geelong, Victoria, Australia
- Kardinia Park (stadium)
- Kardinia Church
- Kardinia International College

== See also ==
- Kardinya, Western Australia
