= Cornish & Bruce =

Cornish & Bruce was a railway contracting company in Victoria, Australia in the mid nineteenth century. The partnership comprised William Crocker Cornish, a building contractor born in Cornwall, England, and John Vans Agnew Bruce, a road and railway construction contractor from Edinburgh.

== William Crocker Cornish ==
Cornish arrived in Melbourne in September 1852 and soon obtained his first contract, for the Melbourne General Post Office in 1853. this was followed by other public buildings including the Geelong Post Office and Geelong Customs House in April 1855, and then in 1856 the Melbourne Houses of Parliament, for a contract worth more than £50,000. Cornish clashed with trade unions over his demand that his workers work a ten-hour day despite all other contractors having accepted the union claim for an eight-hour day. Cornish then had contracts for the Castlemaine and Melbourne gaols (1857) and Bank of New South Wales building in Melbourne (1858).

== John Vans Agnew Bruce ==
Bruce gained his railway engineering experience in Scotland, arriving in Victoria on 4 April 1854. He partnered Peter Le Page at Gisborne in contracts for road construction contracts including the main Melbourne to Mount Alexander road. From 13 September 1856 Bruce continued as a road contractor on his own becoming one of the largest employers in the colony by 1857. He died in Melbourne on 5 April 1863.

== Bendigo Railway ==
Cornish and Bruce combined their talents and resources in June 1858 to tender for constructing the Melbourne, Mount Alexander and Murray River Railway and the Geelong to Ballarat Railway, winning the contract for the first thirteen sections of the Murray River Railway, for £3,357,000, but not the Geelong line. They employed more than six thousand men on the works, but the partners, and Bruce in particular, were known for their attempts to reduce wages, slow payment and attempts to engage non-union labour. The company also instigated a system of payment by truck which led to protests and strikes in July 1858, and forced the Stonemasons' Society to agree to terms by importing four hundred German masons in November 1860. The government had to step in to restore fortnightly payments in July 1860, when Bruce tried to compel the workmen to accept monthly payments, and in 1861 riots ensued, resulting in smashed machinery, assaulted overseers and attempts to derail trains, when he reduced all wages by 2s. per day.

They opened the line to Sunbury on 13 January 1859, despite having to build a temporary timber bridge due to the mason's strike. Cornish, however died on 31 March 1859, leaving Bruce to complete the contract. Bruce moved his main works to Castlemaine by 3 March 1859 and in 1860 established a large foundry to manufacture railway rolling stock.

== Government inquiry ==
There were accusations against Cornish and Bruce, that they used inferior materials and submitting false measurements, which led to a select committee investigation in 1859 under John Woods. However, Woods was forced to resign after an alleged bribery attempt by Bruce. The use of inferior material was proven, but apart from closer scrutiny of the contract, he escaped censure.

Cornish's widow Jane, née Rowell, was a principal litigant in a five-year court case (R. v. Cornish and Bruce) over additional financial claims on the government.
