= St Giles' Presbyterian Church, Geelong =

Former Presbyterian church in Victoria, Australia

St Giles' Presbyterian Church
- The High Church
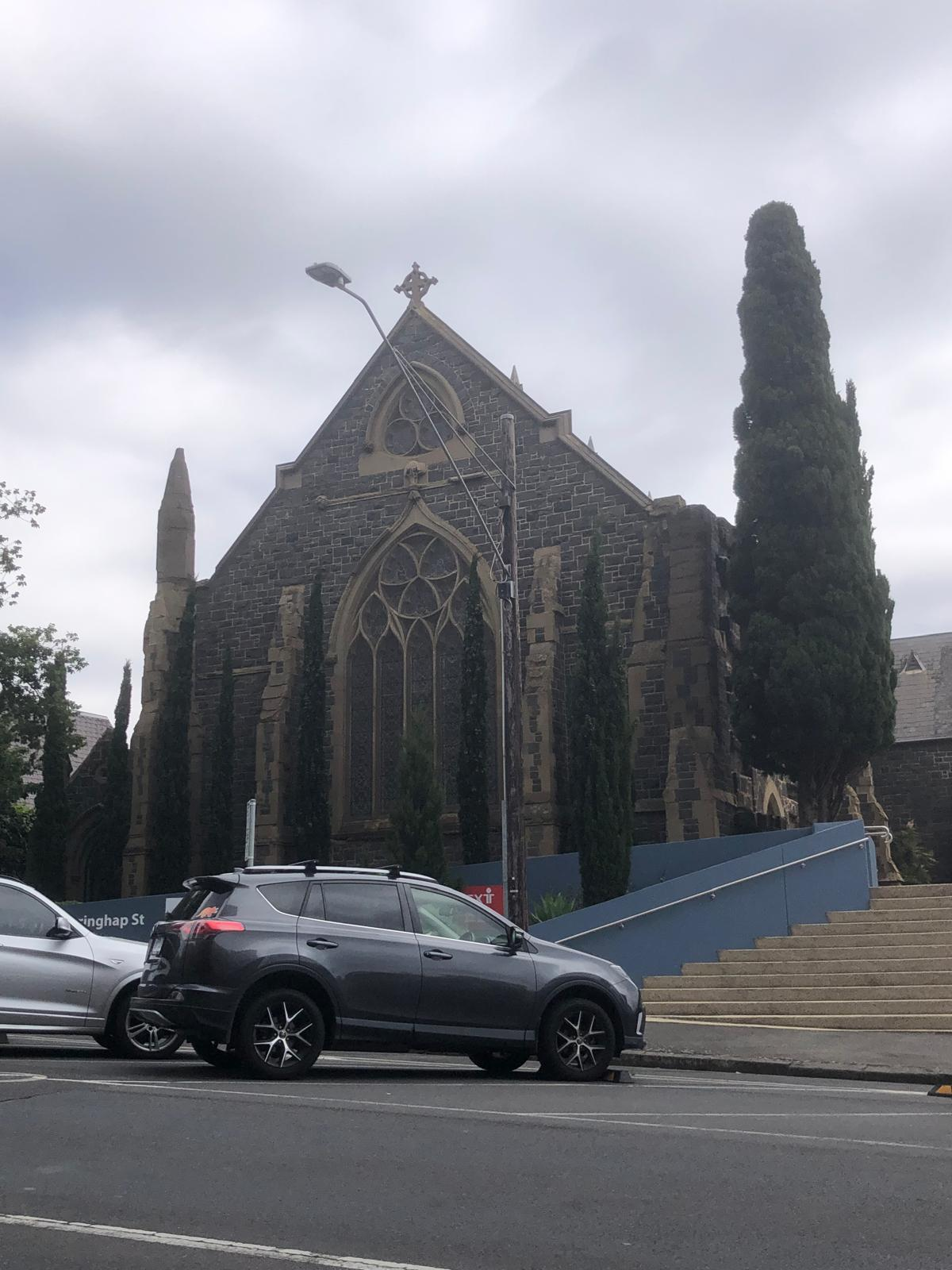
- St Giles' Presbyterian Church, Geelong
- St Giles' Presbyterian Church
- 38°09′00″S 144°21′23″E
- Location: 74 Gheringhap Street, Geelong, Victoria
- Country: Australia
- Previous denomination: Presbyterian

History
- Status: Church (1862–1977); Offices
- Dedication: Saint Giles

Architecture
- Functional status: Closed (as a church)
- Architect: Nathaniel Billing
- Architectural type: Church
- Style: Gothic Revival
- Years built: 1861-1862
- Completed: 1862
- Closed: June 1977

Victorian Heritage Register
- Official name: Former St Giles Church and Free Church School
- Type: Registered place
- Designated: 7 July 1960
- Reference no.: H0633
- Heritage overlay no.: HO244
- Category: Religion

The St Giles' Presbyterian Church is a former Presbyterian church in Geelong, Victoria, Australia. The church, which opened in 1862, served the Presbyterian community up until 1977, when it was deemed redundant as a result of a dwindling congregation.

The building was added to the Victorian Heritage Register on 7 July 1960 in recognition of its historical, architectural and social significance. After its closure as a church, the interior was subsequently transformed into various office spaces.

== History ==
The Free Presbyterian Church formed in the early 1850s as a split from the congregation at St Andrew's Presbyterian Church. The original church was located in Little Malop Street near what is now called Kirk Place. In 1851, John Tait, the then-minister at the church, decided to build a new church in Gheringhap Street. John Tait died in 1860, before the new church was constructed.

St Giles' Presbyterian Church was constructed by Geelong building contractors Boynton & Conway to the design of Nathaniel Billing, and the foundation stone was laid on Tuesday 9 July 1861 by the then-treasurer of the church, John Brown Esq. The church officially opened on Sunday 27 April 1862. The church also contains stained-glass windows by Ferguson and Urie.

In 1938, the church had no minister, and there were plans to demolish the Presbyterian church in Geelong West and place St Giles' Church there, but this never came to fruition. The church was very briefly amalgamated into the Uniting Church of Australia in June 1977, and subsequently closed soon after, as it was deemed redundant.

The building was sold in 1988, and was used as an entertainment venue, which hosted many live bands and performances, including by rock singer Jimmy Barnes. It is now used as various offices.

=== Free Church School ===
Adjacent to the church was the Free Church school and Master's residence, which were built before the church in 1854. These were built in the Tudor Gothic style and were designed by Snell and Kawerau.
