= Belmont Hotel (Geelong) =

Pub in Belmont, Victoria, Australia

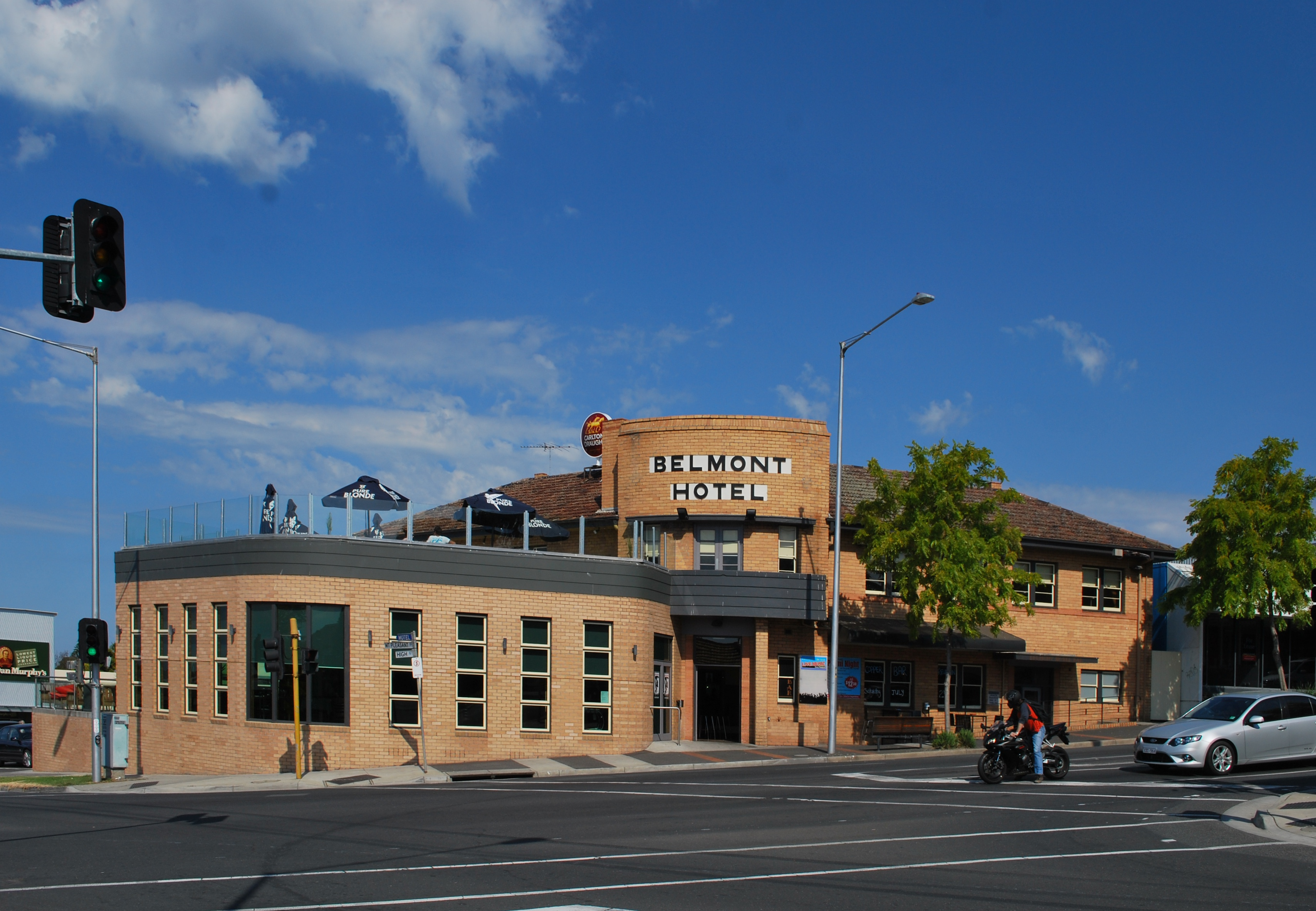
- Interactive map of the Belmont Hotel area

General information
- Location: 77 High Street, Belmont, Victoria, Australia
- Coordinates: 38°10′17″S 144°20′49″E
- Opened: 1852 (as the 'Race Course Hotel')

Other information
- Number of restaurants: 1
- Number of bars: 2

Website
- www.belmonthotelgeelong.com.au

The Belmont Hotel, in the Geelong suburb of Belmont, Victoria, Australia, is a renovated 19th-century pub, which is home to a bar (and rooftop bar), and restaurant. In 2018, the hotel underwent a large renovation, transforming the interior into the art deco style.

== History ==
The Belmont Hotel came into existence as the Race Course Hotel in 1852, likely named for its close proximity to the Belmont Common, where horseracing used to occur before moving to the Geelong Racecourse.

In October 1861, a Geelong Advertiser article noted that archery was one of the sports available to patrons. A Geelong accountant known as Mr. John Gatliff, self-proclaimed Honorary Secretary of the "Geelong Archery Club", attempted garner members for his new club, but the attendance was negligible, and was subsequently adjourned. Gatliff tried again in 1863, advertising again in the Geelong Advertiser, but nothing came to fruition.

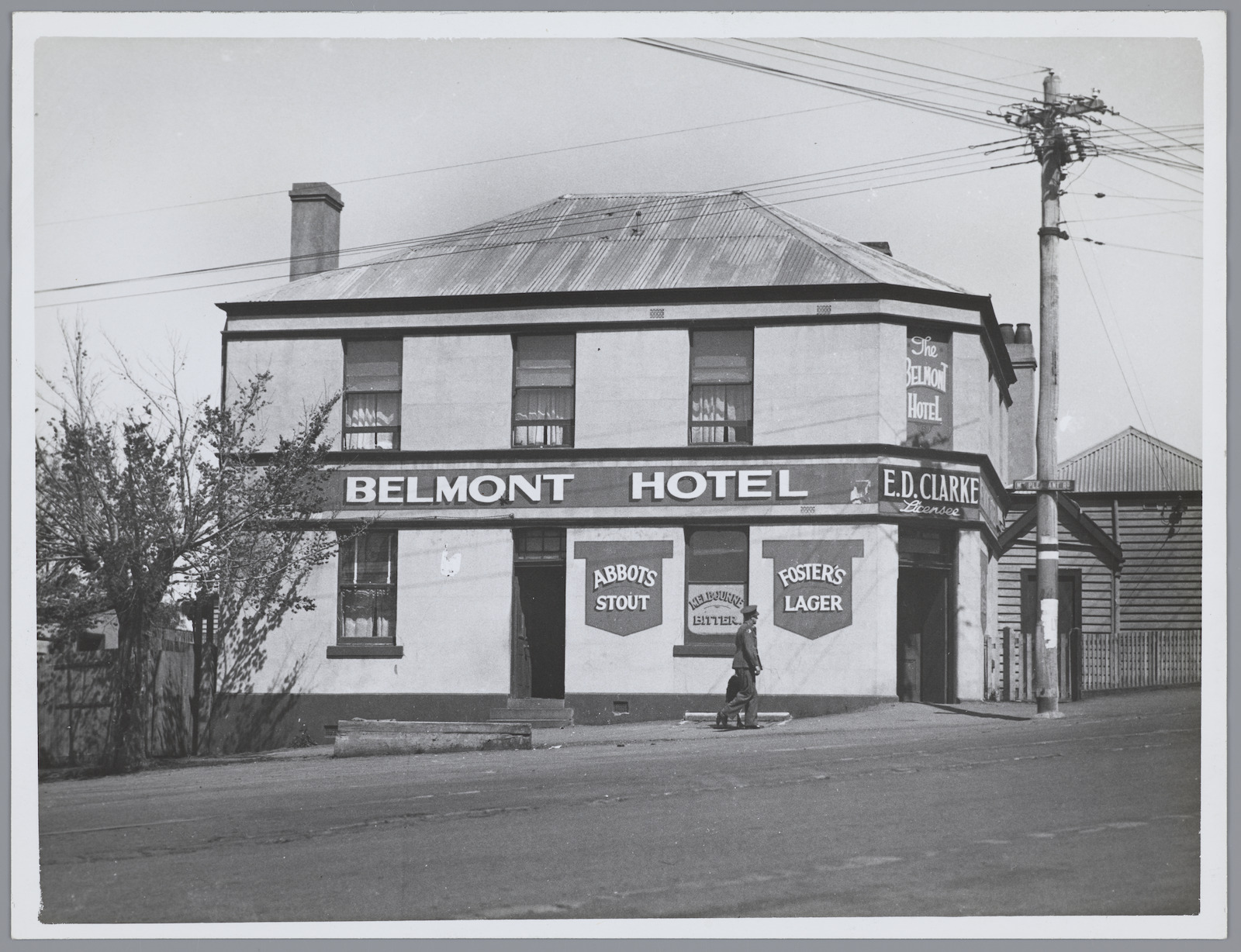
Belmont Hotel, October 16, 1940

In 1966, the then-publican Cliff Splatt opened the Copper Bar, attached to the Belmont Hotel. It was noted for its walls covered with copper pennies, which became outdated after the introduction of decimal currency in Australia. In the 1980s, the display was expanded with the creation of a map of Australia, using 1200 coins and the Australian coat of arms, using 1500, taking roughly three weeks to complete. The Copper Bar closed in 1990, after Cliff Splatt passed away on 16 September 1990, and Cliff Splatt's family moved to Queenscliff and took over the Royal Hotel.

Volunteer fireman, Garry 'Dutchy' Vredeveldt, who also worked among the security staff, died in the 1998 Linton Bushfire.
