= St John's Anglican Church, Highton =

Anglican church in Highton, Victoria, Australia

- St John's Church of England Church
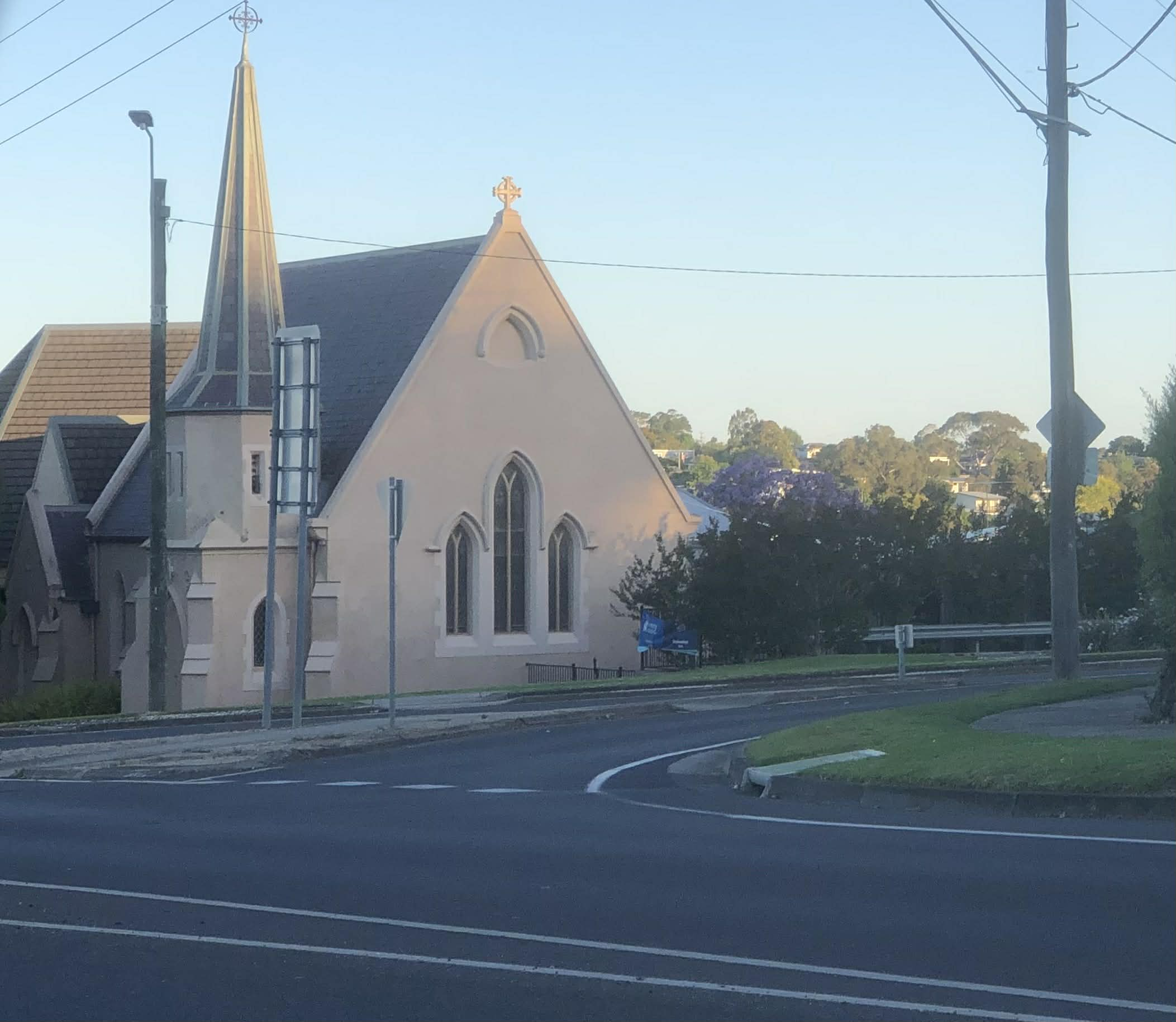
- St John's Anglican Church
- St John's Anglican Church, Highton
- 38°10′22″S 144°19′07″E
- Location: 269 Roslyn Road Highton, Victoria
- Country: Australia
- Denomination: Anglican Church of Australia
- Website: stjohnshighton.org.au

History
- Status: Active
- Dedication: Saint John

Architecture
- Style: Gothic
- Years built: 1866-1867, 1926 (reconstruction), 1990, 2014-2015
- Completed: 1867 (later additions)

Administration
- Province: Victoria
- Diocese: Melbourne

St John's Anglican Church is an Anglican church located in the Geelong suburb of Highton, Victoria, Australia. Established as a congregation in 1858, the present church was constructed in 1866 and, despite being destroyed by a tornado in 1926, was reconstructed, and has served as a centre of Anglican worship in the region since that time.

== History ==
The origins of St John's Anglican Church date to 1858, when the first Church of England services in Highton were held in a local day school on Barrabool Road. Plans for a permanent church followed as the district developed. Land for the church was donated by local landowner G. F. Belcher, and the foundation stone was laid on 22 November 1866 by the Very Reverend Hussey Macartney, the Dean of Melbourne at the time. The church building was completed and opened in 1867.

A significant event in the church's history occurred on 22 July 1926, when a tornado struck Highton, severely damaging the church by removing its roof and destroying associated buildings, including the Sunday school. Following the disaster, the church was rebuilt using much of the original material, and a spire was added during the reconstruction.

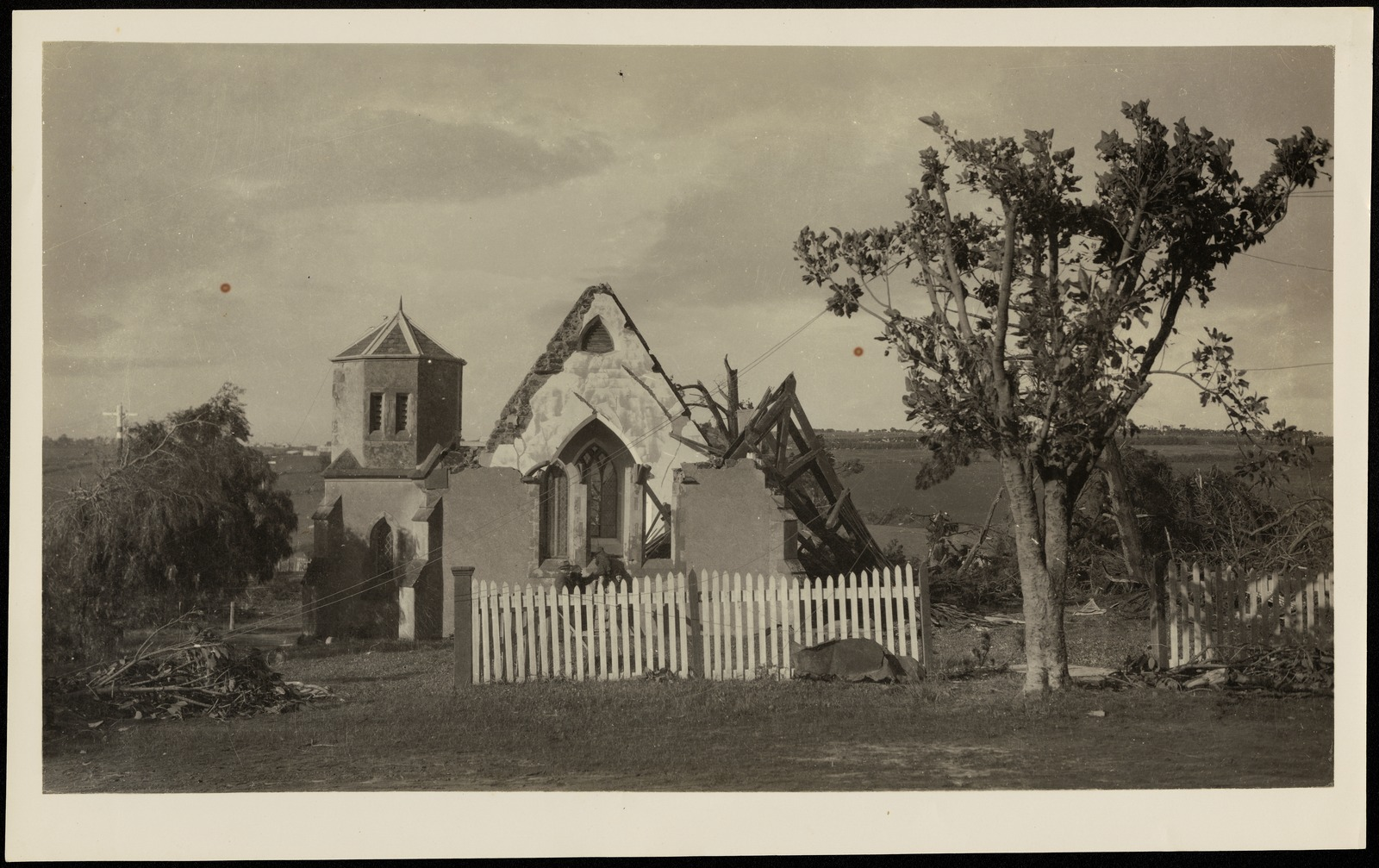
The church after the tornado struck, 1926.

During the mid-twentieth century, Highton underwent substantial suburban growth, particularly after the Second World War. This expansion led to increased attendance and the need for additional facilities. A new Sunday school building was opened in 1960 to accommodate the growing number of children and families connected to the church.

Major building works were undertaken in 1990, and in 2008, St John's celebrated its 150th anniversary of Anglican services in Highton.

A significant redevelopment occurred in 2014-2015, which expanded the church's facilities and improved its capacity.
