= Geelong Customs House =

Heritage-listed building in Geelong, Victoria, Australia

Coordinates: 38.1452°S 144.3623°E

The Geelong Customs House is a bluestone and freestone classical style public building in Geelong, Victoria, built in 1855. It replaced a small timber prefabricated building of 1838, which was later relocated to the Geelong Botanic Gardens.

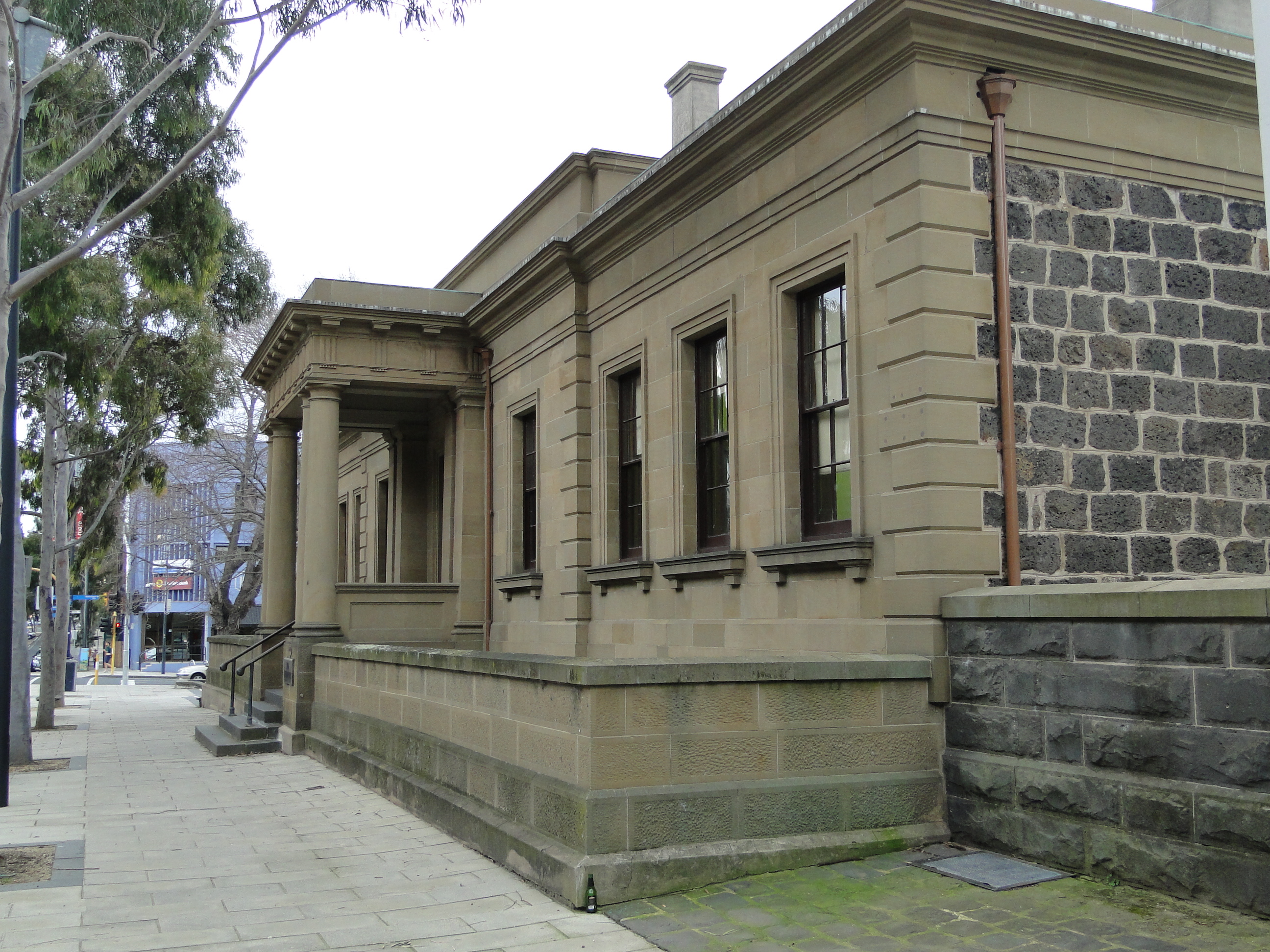
Geelong Customs House

The Customs House was erected near the Geelong foreshore to serve the needs of the colonial administration during the peak of the gold rushes. The building was designed by John James Clark and constructed by William Crocker Cornish in April 1855. The Geelong Customs House is listed on the Victorian Heritage Register, and City of Greater Geelong Heritage Overlay. The building is no longer used for its original purpose, but was restored in 2012, winning a National Trust Award. It previously housed offices and the 'Custom House Restaurant and Wine Bar'. As of September 2024, the City of Greater Geelong announced it would refurbish the interior of the building to house a new Design and Creative Hub.
