= St. John the Baptist Macedonian Orthodox Church, Geelong =

St. John the Baptist Macedonian Orthodox Church
- Македонска Православна Црква „Св. Јован Крстител“ Makedonska Pravoslavna Crkva „Sv. Jovan Krstitel“
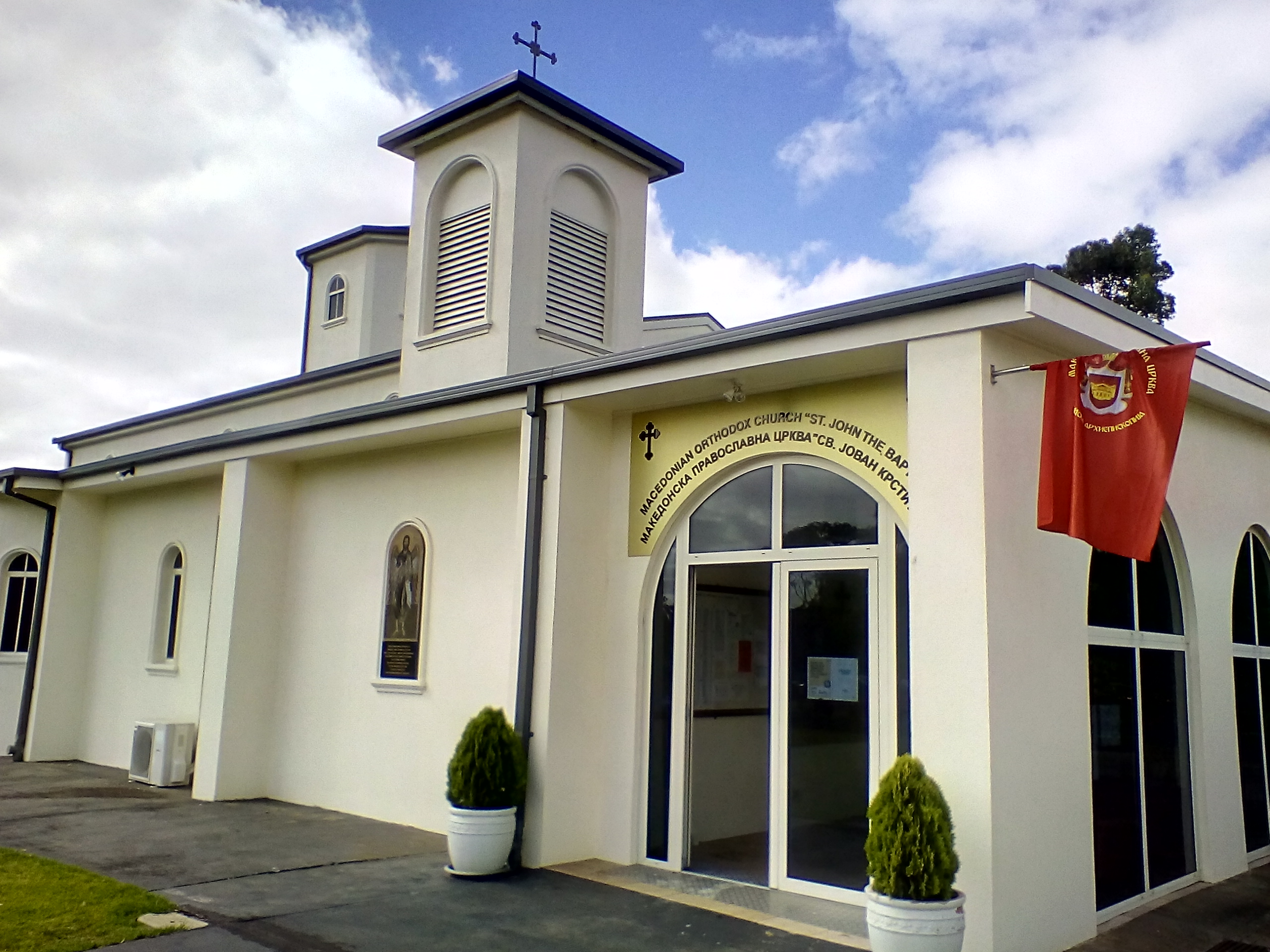

- Location in the City of Greater Geelong
- 38°05′43″S 144°18′29″E
- Location: 465 Ballarat Rd, Batesford 3213, City of Greater Geelong, Victoria
- Country: Australia
- Denomination: Macedonian Orthodox
- Website: St. John the Baptist Church

History
- Status: Church
- Founded: 1971
- Dedication: St. John the Baptist
- Consecrated: 1978

Architecture
- Functional status: Active
- Architectural type: Church
- Groundbreaking: 1971

Administration
- Diocese: Macedonian Orthodox Diocese of Australia - Sydney

Clergy
- Priest: Reverend Father Čedomir Ilievski

The St. John the Baptist Macedonian Orthodox Church (Macedonian: Македонска Православна Црква "Св. Јован Крстител", Makedonska Pravoslavna Crkva "Sv. Jovan Krstitel") is a Macedonian Orthodox church on the outskirts of Batesford, near Geelong, Victoria, Australia.

Construction of the church began in 1971 and it was consecrated in 1978.

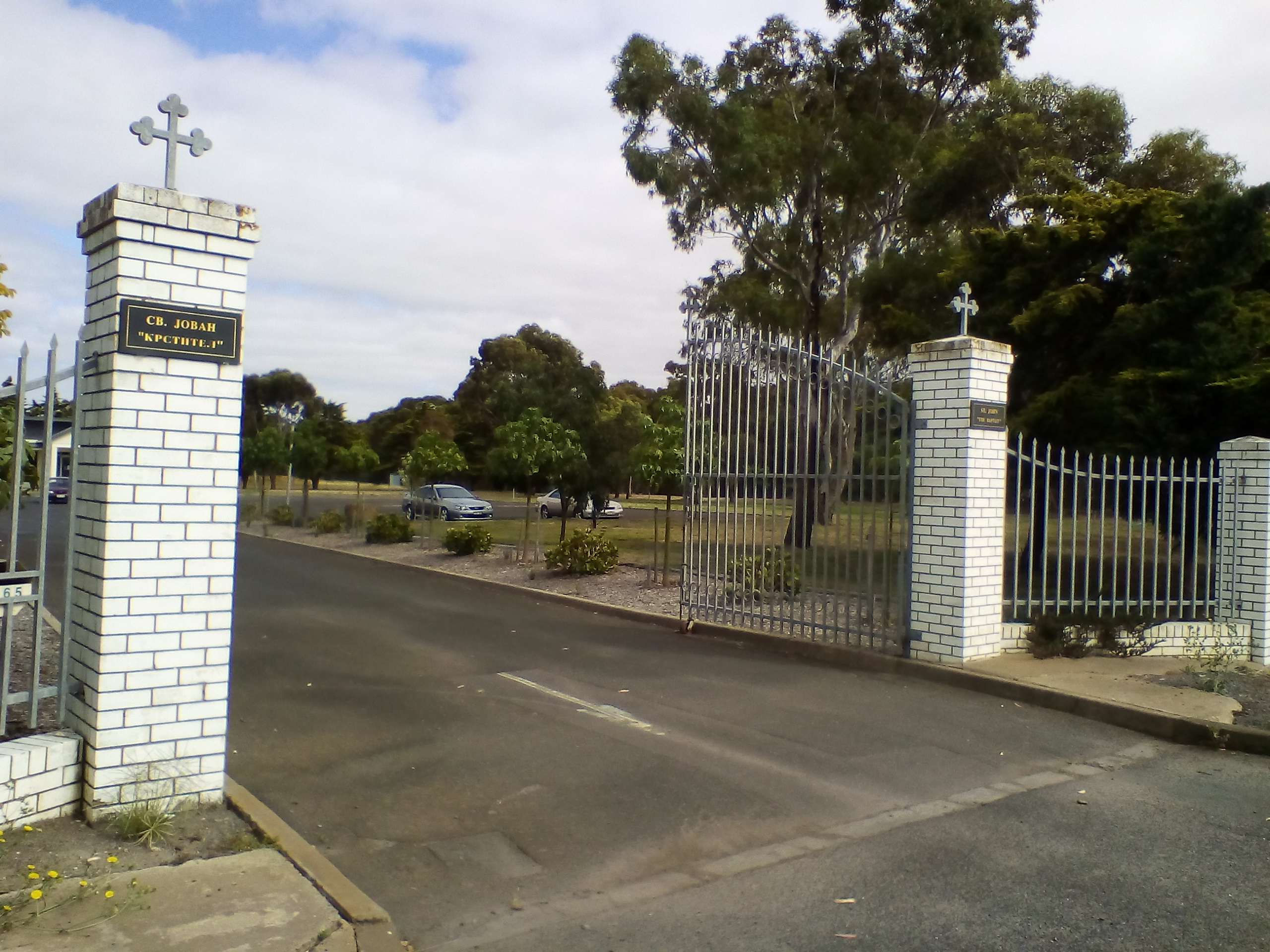
External entrance

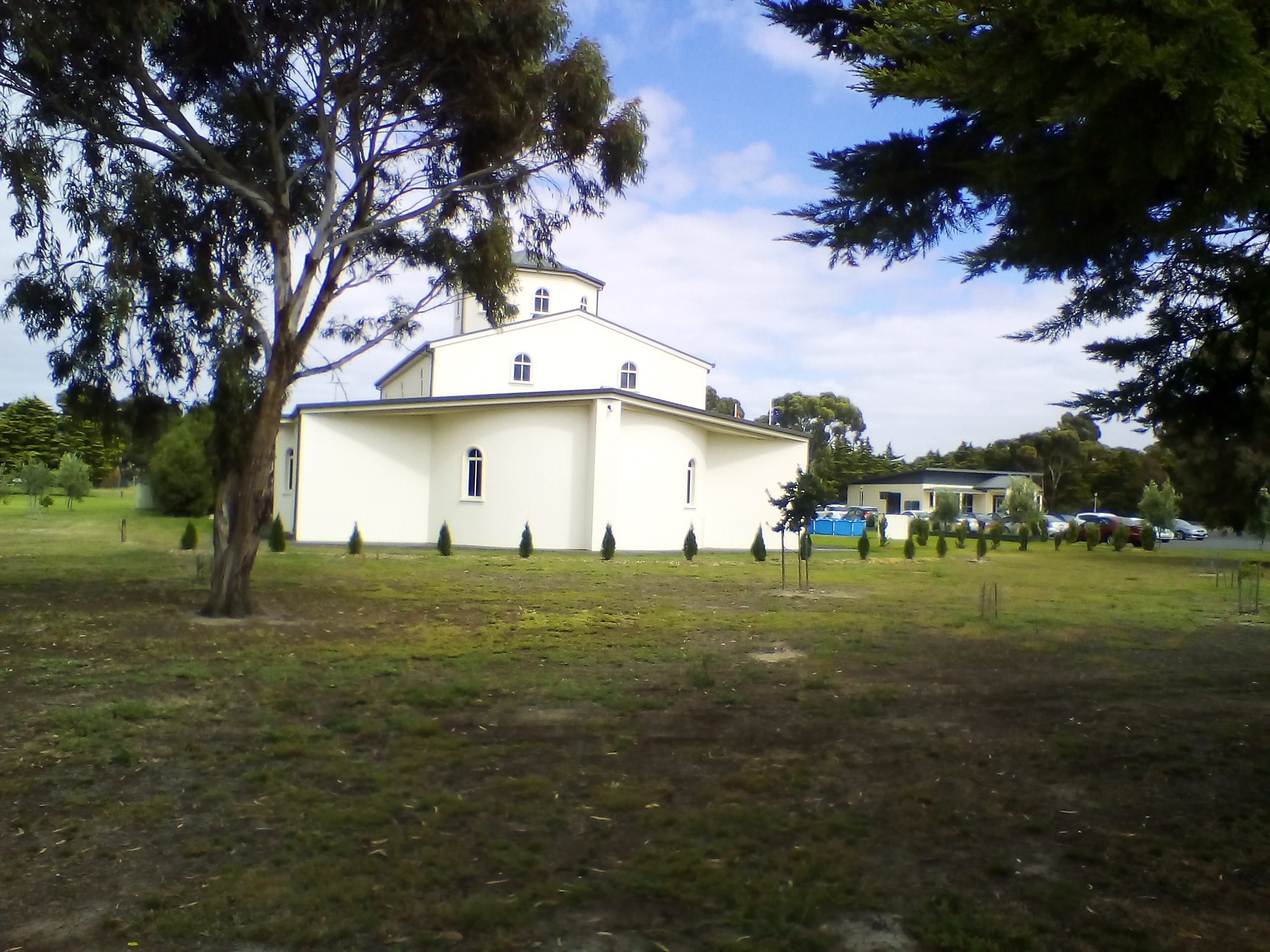
Church apse

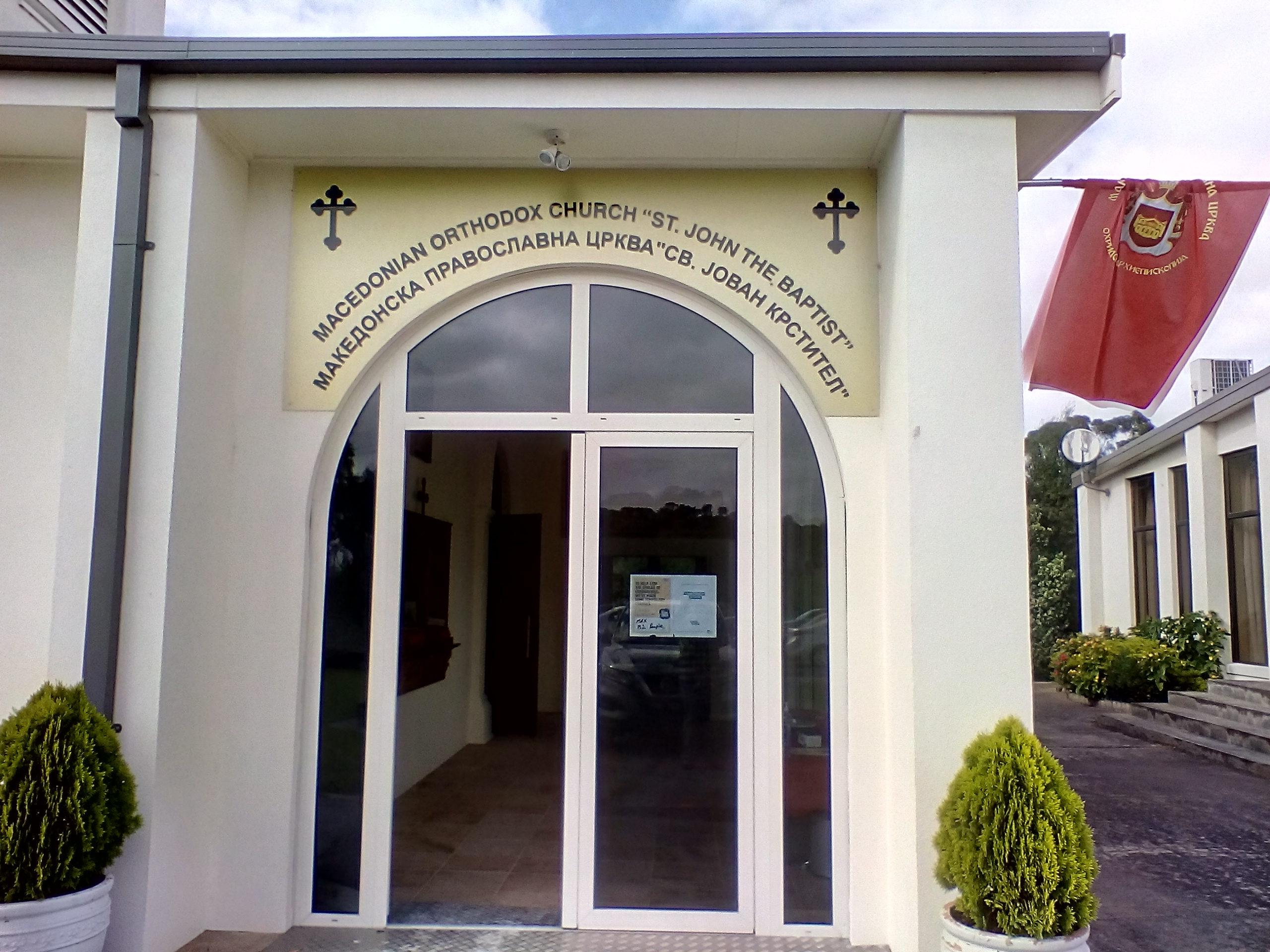
Church entrance

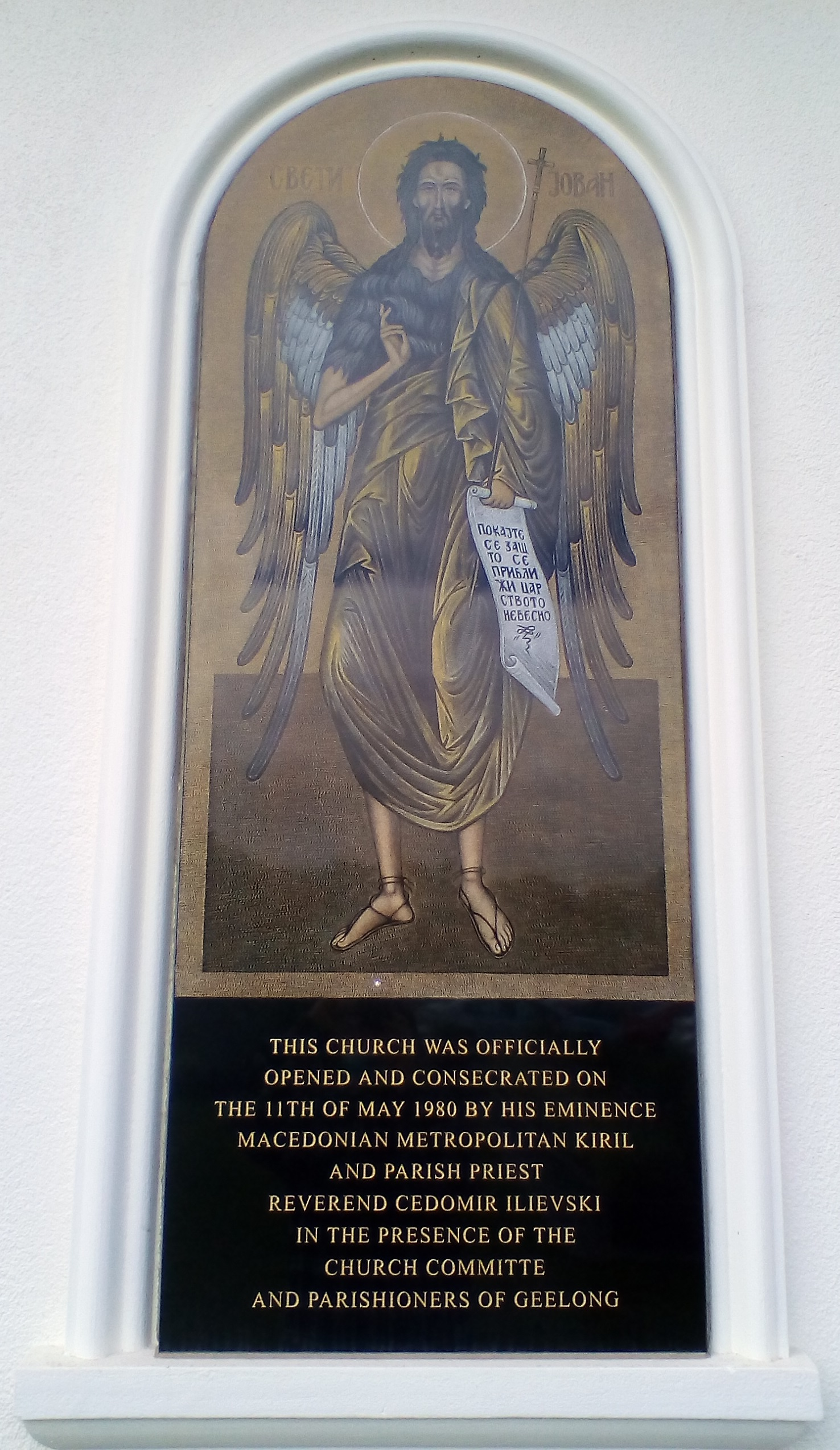
John the Baptist icon and plaque commemorating consecration

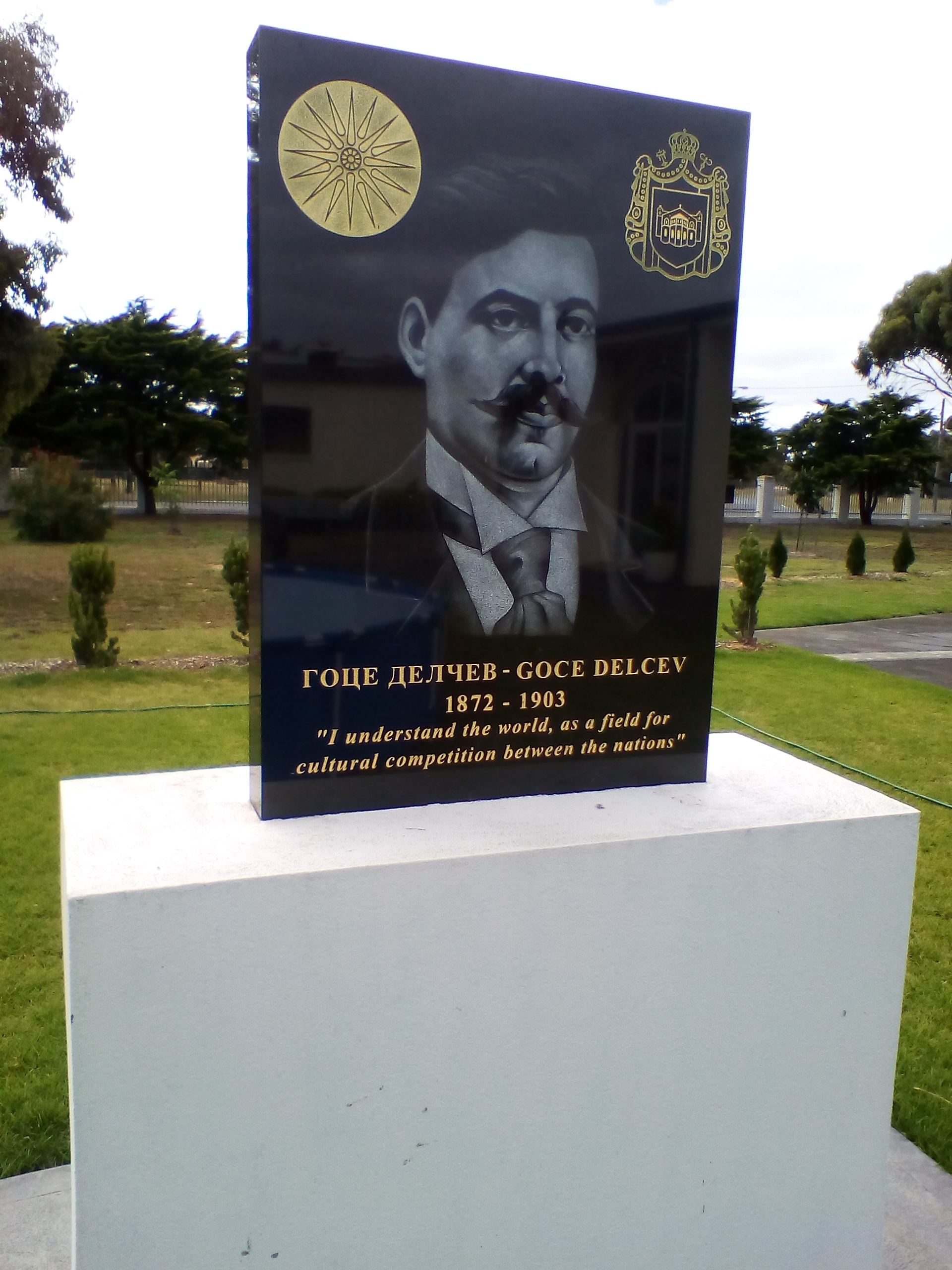
Goce Delčev monument

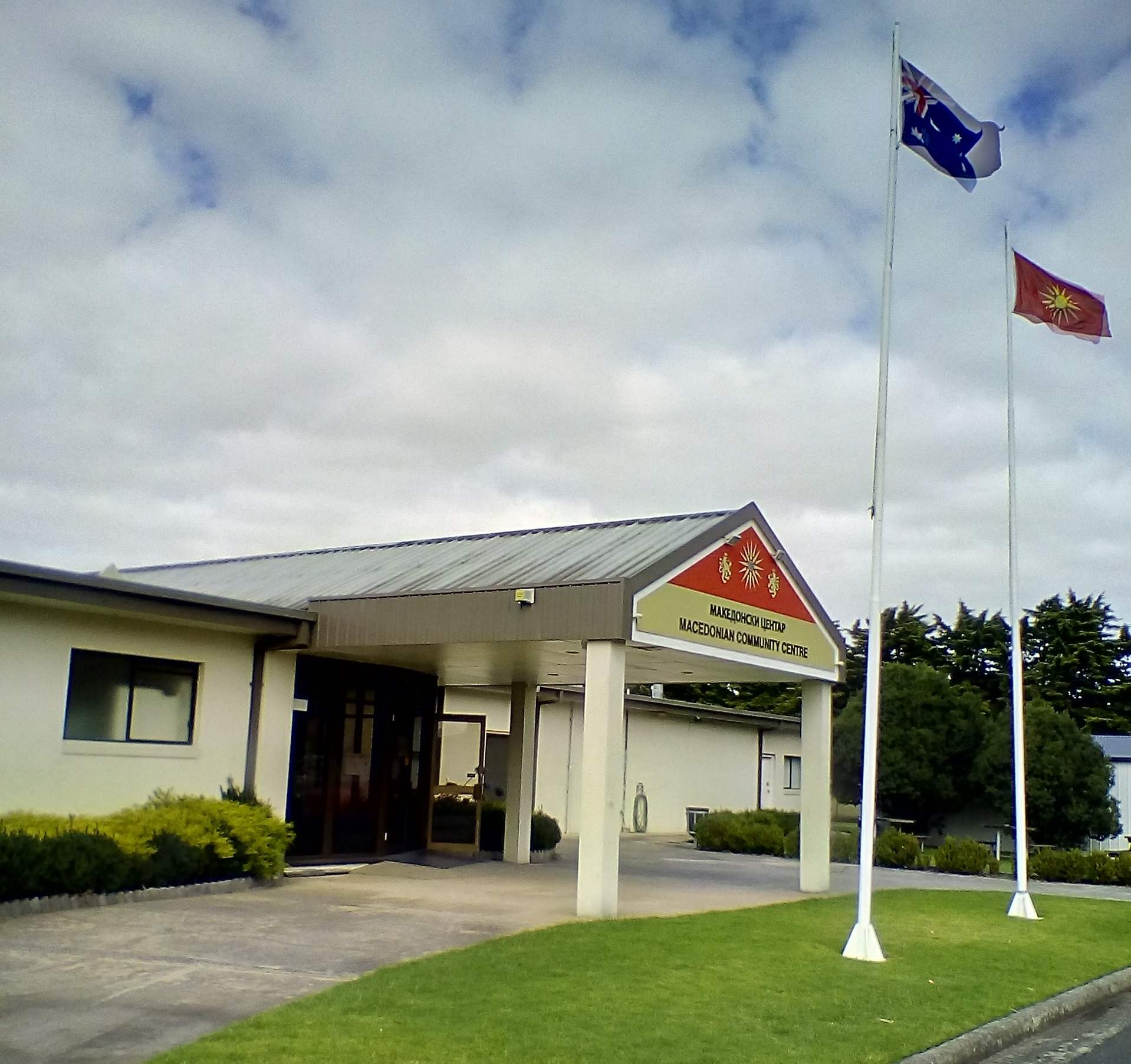
Macedonian Community Centre

== See also ==
- Geelong Hungarian Seventh-day Adventist Church
- St Nicholas Serbian Orthodox Church, Geelong
- Geelong Russian Orthodox Church
- Macedonian Australians
