= Old Geelong Post Office =

Post office in Victoria, Australia

Coordinates: 38.1482°S 144.3571°E

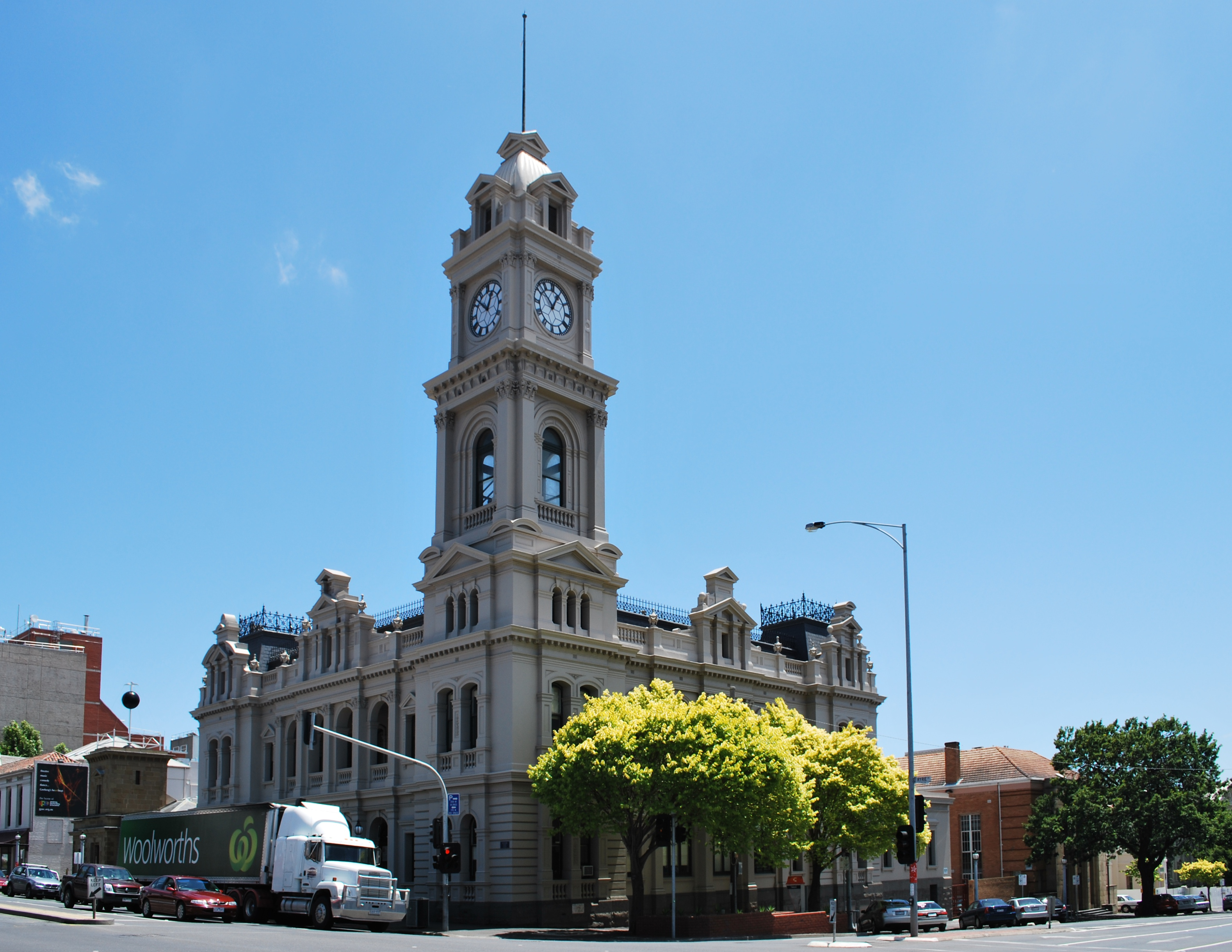
Old Geelong Post Office

The current Geelong post office opened in 1994 and is located on the corner of Gheringhap and Little Myers Streets. The original post office was located on the corner of Ryrie and Gheringhap Streets. The Geelong Telegraph Station was located next door.

== History ==
The first post office in Geelong, which opened around June 1840, was in a corner of a store in Barwon Terrace, South Geelong. After August 1842, the Geelong Advertiser office was used as a post office.

A permanent post office was completed in 1857 on the corner of Ryrie and Gheringhap Streets, erected by contractor William Crocker Cornish. It was demolished in 1889 to make way for the building that stands on the site today. The new building was opened in 1891, with one major omission – the clock tower did not have a clock in it.

Work on providing a clock and chimes started in July 1911, as a memorial to the late King Edward VII, following a fund-raising campaign, with a London firm contracted to supply the timepiece. Each clock face is 2.5 meters in diameter. The hour hands are a meter long, and the minute hands 1.25 meters long. The chimes comprise five bells, the largest one weighing 15 hundredweight (760 kg). They were first activated on 2 December 1911.

== Today ==
In 1994, Australia Post relocated the main Geelong post office to the corner of Gheringhap and Little Myers streets. The old post office building was purchased by the City of Greater Geelong and is currently used as a youth services hub.
