= Geelong Synagogue =

- Location in Geelong, Melbourne

Religion
- Affiliation: Judaism (former)
- Ecclesiastical or organizational status: Synagogue (1861–c. 1990s); Commercial offices
- Year consecrated: 1861
- Status: Closed (as a synagogue); Repurposed

Location
- Location: McKillop Street, Geelong, Victoria
- Country: Australia
- Interactive map of Geelong Synagogue

Architecture
- Architect: John Young
- Type: Italianate architecture
- Established: 1861; 165 years ago
- Groundbreaking: 22 July 1861
- Victorian Heritage Register
- Official name: Geelong Synagogue (former); Former Synagogue
- Type: State heritage (built)
- Designated: 14 September 1995
- Reference no.: 3015
- Type: Synagogue
- Category: Religion
- Builders: Jones and Halpin

The Geelong Synagogue is a former synagogue at the corner of McKillop and Yarra Streets, Geelong, Victoria, Australia. It was designed by John Young and built in 1861 by Jones and Halpin. It is no longer used as a synagogue, but has been refurbished and is in use as offices. It was listed on the Victorian Heritage Register on 14 September 1995.

== Significance and history ==
The synagogue is a particularly distinctive and important architectural design, in the Italianate style and in the eclectic and diverse manner of the architect John Young. The building is of social importance as the Synagogue of Geelong and in the history of the Jewish community in the area.

It is a comparatively early building in Geelong and is of some importance in the surrounding townscape. The structure exhibits a detailing which is uncommon in buildings of this period, including the detailing to the side bays and particularly the corner piers and the broken pediment with its heavy brackets above the semi-circular gable light. There is a stucco porch with distinctive and prominent classically derived details. The form of the round headed side windows is unusual and the glazing pattern distinctive. The interior is believed to be intact and is notable for its exposition of the architect styles used for buildings of the smaller religious congregations during the nineteenth century.

The synagogue is a four bayed structure with gables to either end, an advancing stuccoed porch and an apse to the other end. The walls are stuccoed and the roof is of slate. The corners of the main facade feature prominent piers elaborately decorated with recessed shafts, prominent string courses and other mouldings, recessed panels and prominent and distinctive brackets supporting the broken pediment motif above. The porch is also stuccoed and features prominent quoins, bourgeois and architrave moulding, round headed paired entrance doors, string course on brackets and a parapet. Above the porch is a large semi-circular window with prominent key stone and architrave mouldings. The side walls are arranged with recessed panels about each round headed window, surmounted by large key-stones and brackets in the form of dentals. There is a string course beneath the windows which feature an elaborate pattern of glazing bars and coloured glass. The interior is restrained and the apse is framed by a circular arch on Corinthian based pilasters. The structure was built in 1861 to the designs of architects John Young and F. T. Honey, practising as Young and Honey and the builders were Jones and Halpin. The foundation stone was laid on 22 July 1861 and the Synagogue was consecrated on 1 December 1861. This building replaced an earlier wooden building erected at the corner of Yarra and McKillop Streets, Geelong, which was consecrated on 1 June 1854. The building is intact both externally and internally and is in good condition.

== Description ==
The synagogue is a single-storey gabled building with an apsidal extension on the eastern gable end. The roof is of slate and the brick walls have been cement rendered. A rectangular, flat-roofed, porch extends westward from the main gable end. It is enframed in much the same way as entrance doors to early homes in Ohio in the United States. The raking cornice of the gable forms an overhanging eave and a broken horizontal cornice is supported on either side by a pier giving the impression of a pediment. The latter is emphasised by prominent modillions, which are also used below the projecting cornice of the porch.

Within the tympanum is a Diocletian window, common in Palladian architecture, with a moulded architrave and keystone. The piers are astylar and though prominent are decorated in low relief. In plan form they resemble early nave piers of the Norman period. The engaged colonettes enframe a rectangular moulding with a central circle. This decorative element was commonly used in early Italian renaissance architecture as well as subsequent adaptations. The small circular reliefs used in the upper section of the pier are most unusual and may be simplified version of the patera, commonly used motifs in the Adam style. They have been replicated in an exceptional manner in the stained glass windows.

The elevation of the porch is overwhelmed by quoining especially by the Gibbs surround of the round-arched entrance. Above the paired wooden doors is a plain fanlight with a Hebrew inscription. The side walls are externally divided into four bays by plain pilasters. Within each bay is a round-arched window with a sill course below and keystone above which is extended to a wide string course. The string course, with dentils below, runs the full length of the side walls. This is an element common to many of Young's works including the Golden Age and Argyle Hotels. An unusual decorative element, however, is the stepping of the string course to represent a capital on the pilasters. Together with the dentils it appears to be a representation of ionic volutes. Such a treatment of classical elements is not unusual in Young's work.

Internally there is a curved stained wood ceiling with a semi circular cut-out to a low light to enter from the Diocletian window above the balcony. Below the balcony is a vestibule, a small room and the staircase. The building is slightly water damaged. At the time it was assessed for the former Register of the National Estate, the local Jewish community wished to demolish the building (which stands on a grant of Crown land) because of the cost of upkeep and the tiny congregation, so it was not used for other purposes. The building remains, has been refurbished, and is now being used as offices.

Because Young built the first synagogue and the similarities in style with his other buildings the synagogue is attributed to Young alone (rather than Young and Honey).

== See also ==
- List of synagogues in Australia and New Zealand
- History of the Jews in Australia
