= Fenwick Street Baptist Church =

Former Baptist church in Geelong, Victoria, Australia

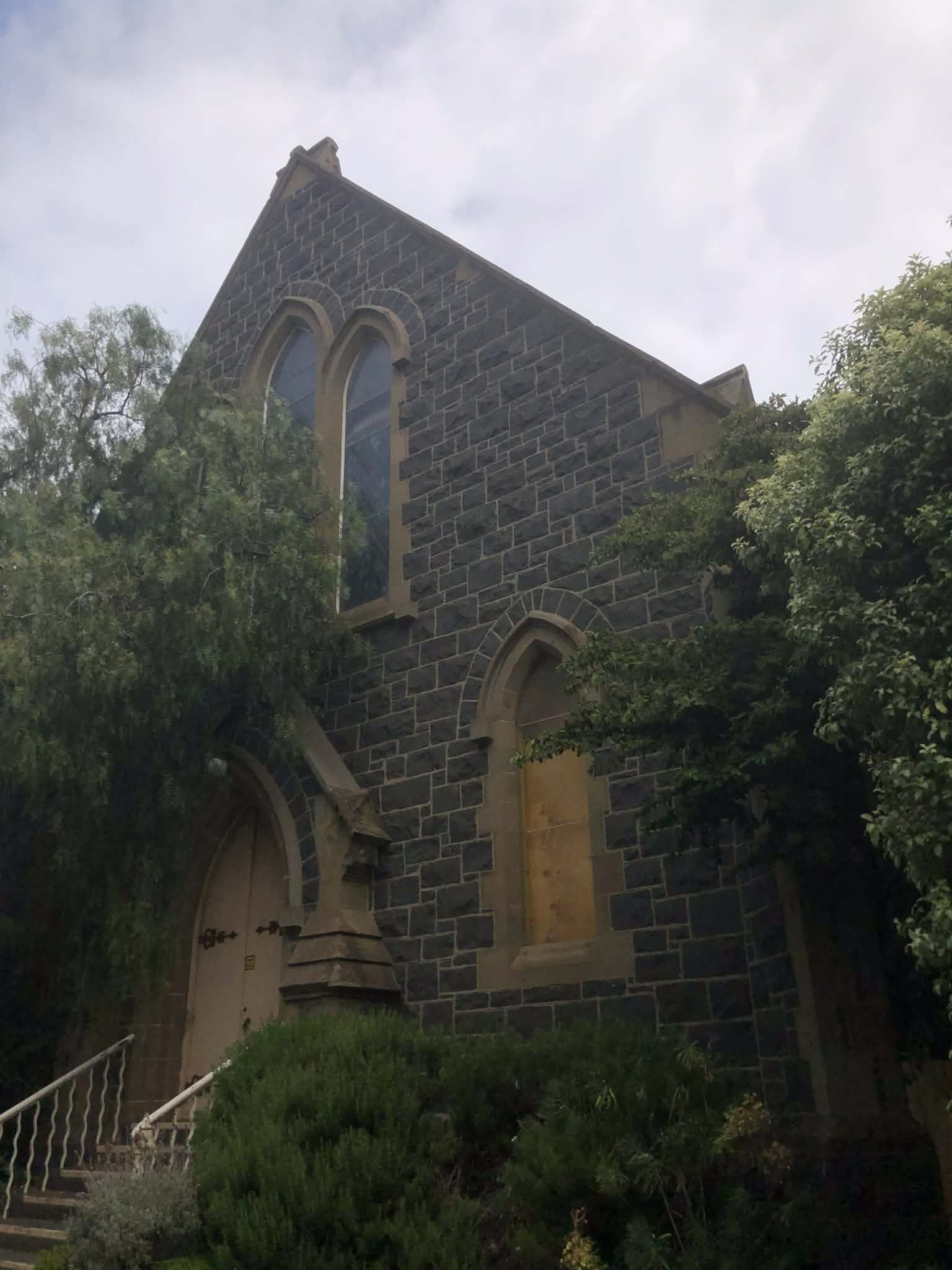
- Fenwick Street Baptist Church
- Fenwick Street Baptist Church
- 38°08′50″S 144°21′17″E
- Location: 14 Fenwick Street, Geelong, Victoria
- Country: Australia
- Denomination: Baptist

History
- Status: Closed; used as offices

Architecture
- Architectural type: Gothic Revival
- Completed: 1854 (original church), 1868 (present church structure)

Victorian Heritage Register
- Official name: Baptist Church and Sunday School
- Type: Heritage Place
- Reference no.: 18633
- Heritage Overlay number: HO920

Fenwick Street Baptist Church was a Baptist church located in the centre of Geelong, Victoria, Australia. The heritage-listed bluestone church was constructed in 1868, and the building was used for Baptist services until 1922. It has since been sold and turned into offices.

== History ==
The Baptist first worshipped in a small wooden church located in Spring Street, Little Scotland (present-day Geelong West). In 1854, the congregation moved to a wooden church in Fenwick Street, which was then replaced by the present bluestone church in 1868. In 1922, the congregation moved to a Baptist church in East Geelong, and the church was eventually used by the Church of Christ, Scientists until at least 2005, when the church was converted to offices.
