= Geelong city centre =

Geelong
- Suburb
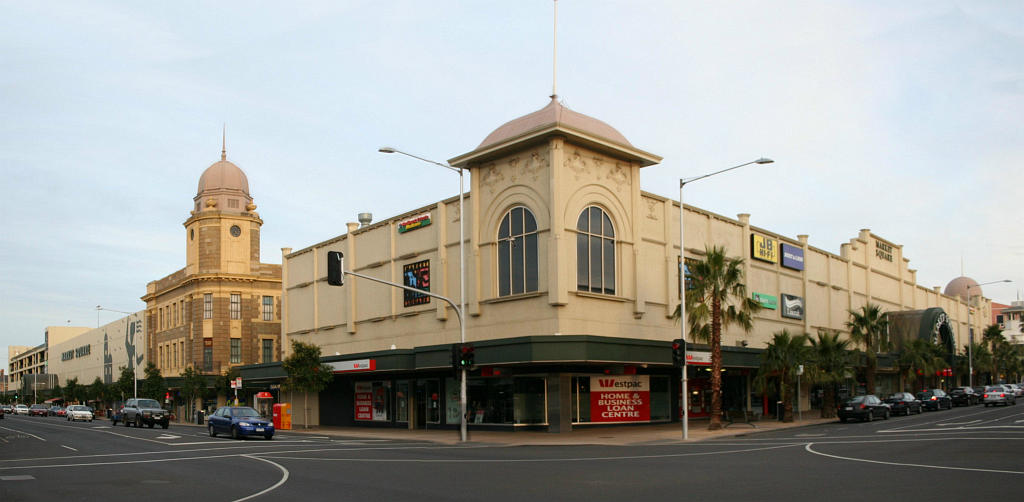
- Corner of Moorabool and Malop Streets, Geelong

- Interactive map of Geelong
- Coordinates: 38°09′35″S 144°21′52″E
- Country: Australia
- State: Victoria
- City: Geelong
- LGA: City of Greater Geelong

Government
  - State electorate: Geelong
  - Federal division: Corio

Population
  - Total: 5,210 (2016 census)
- Postcode: 3220
Suburbs around Geelong
North Geelong	Drumcondra	Corio Bay
Geelong West	Geelong	East Geelong
Newtown	South Geelong	East Geelong

The Geelong city centre is the urban centre and main commercial locality of the Geelong metropolitan area, also referred to as the Geelong CBD, Central Geelong, the Central Activities Area, or informally as "Town". The name of the area is officially gazetted as Geelong.

The Geelong city centre is the oldest part of Geelong and includes many of the city's historic landmarks such as the Geelong City Hall, St. Mary of the Angels Basilica, the T & G Building, Johnstone Park, Geelong railway station, and the old Geelong Post Office. It is also a cultural area for the region, housing the Geelong Art Gallery and the Geelong Arts Centre, as well as the Deakin University waterfront campus. Tourist attractions include the Geelong Waterfront, Eastern Beach, and the National Wool Museum.

The city centre is one of Geelong's major shopping districts. Two large shopping centres, Westfield Geelong and Market Square Shopping Centre, have been opened in the last three decades, which has led to a decline in street shopping on the city's two main thoroughfares, Moorabool Street and Ryrie Street, resulting in a declining number of customers and some empty shops.

The Geelong city centre has seen some significant redevelopment since 2016. In 2018, the WorkSafe office building was opened, followed by the National Disability Insurance Agency (NDIA) national headquarters in 2019, significantly altering the skyline. New multi-storey apartment buildings, such as The Mercer and The Miramar, have also been built recently.

The Geelong city centre is served by a local low-power transmission of narrowcast radio station 3GL 1341AM, broadcasting on 87.6 FM to the city. Also available in the city is low-power narrowcaster Faith FM on 88.0 FM. Both are translators, 3GL is broadcasting from the Geelong Broadcasters building, while Faith FM is retransmitting its signal for full coverage in the city. Parts of surrounding suburb Belmont can also receive the transmissions, although both contain interference from other transmitters and the signals there are low.

== Population ==
In the 2016 Census, there were 5,210 people living in the Geelong city centre. 69.5% of people were born in Australia. The next most common countries of birth were England 3.1%, India 2.7%, Italy 2.0% and China 1.9%. 75.5% of people spoke only English at home. Other languages spoken included Italian 2.8% and Mandarin Chinese 2.4%. The most common responses for religion were No Religion 33.1% and Catholic 26.0%.
