= Kardinia Church =

Coordinates: 38.1147158°S 144.33108°E

- Kardinia Church Logo
- Kardinia Church
- Country: Australia
- Website: kardinia.org.au

History
- Former name(s): Drumcondra Church of Christ, Manifold Heights Church of Christ, Kardinia Christian Fellowship
- Founded: 1915

Kardinia Church is a church based in Bell Post Hill, Geelong, Australia, with campuses in Ballarat, Warrnambool, Bell Post Hill and Melbourne. The church was established in 1915 as the Drumcondra Church of Christ. It was led by Senior Pastors Rick and Leonie Wright.

== History ==
Drumcondra Church of Christ was established in 1915. It moved to Manifold Heights in 1965 and reopened as the Manifold Heights Church of Christ. The church later relocated to its present site in Bell Post Hill. The church became known as Kardinia Christian Fellowship.

In 2001, the fellowship moved to its new home and became Kardinia Church.

Since then, Kardinia has continued to expand with campuses in four locations throughout Victoria.

There are four Kardinia Church campuses located throughout Victoria, Australia.

=== Geelong North ===
The North campus is located on Kardinia Drive in Bell Post Hill, with services every Sunday morning, and a Swahili service on Sunday afternoons. The North campus pastors are Justin and Jodie Gall. Also located on the North Campus site is Kardinia Childcare and Kindergarten, and the Kardinia Outlet Cafe.

=== Ballarat ===
Kardinia Church's Ballarat campus is located in Sebastopol, Victoria, with services each Sunday morning led by campus pastors Shayne and Emily Westblade.

=== Warrnambool ===
20 Tylden Street Dennington is home to Kardinia in Warrnambool. Sandro and Susan Schietroma were Kardinia's Warrnambool campus pastors. Kardinia also operates a kindergarten and childcare centre in Warrnambool.

== Kardinia Childcare and Kindergarten ==
Kardinia operates two childcare centres in Geelong and Warrnambool. The childcare centres and kindergartens are situated on the church's Geelong North and Warrnambool campus'.
