= St John's Lutheran Church, Geelong =

Lutheran church in Victoria, Australia

St John's Lutheran Church
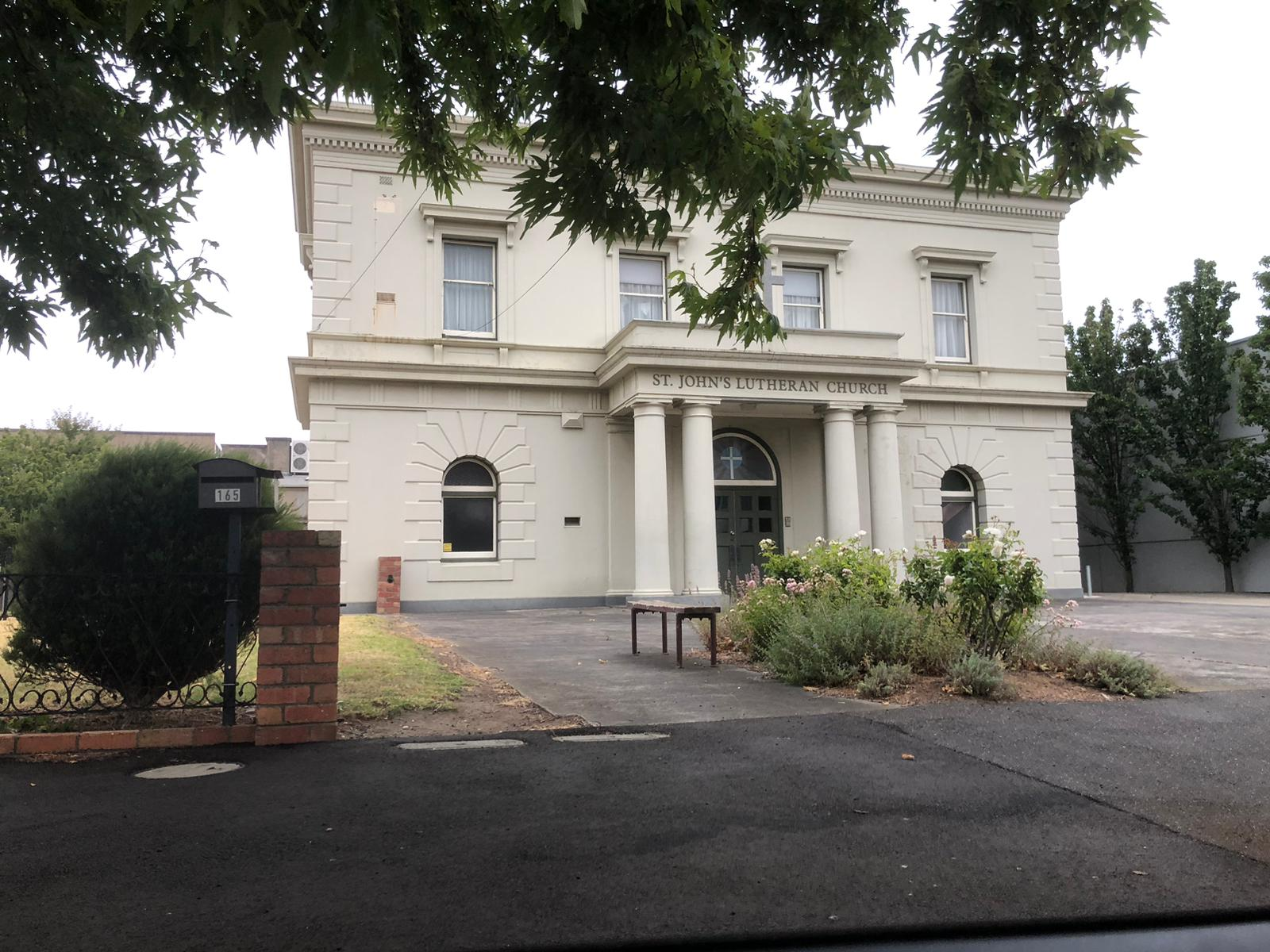
- St John's Lutheran Church
- St John's Lutheran Church
- 38°09′14″S 144°21′40″E
- Location: 165 Yarra Street, Geelong, Victoria
- Country: Australia
- Denomination: Lutheran

History
- Former name: St Andrew's Presbyterian Church
- Status: Active
- Founder: Andrew Love (Presbyterian period)
- Dedication: Saint John

Architecture
- Architect: Alexander Skene
- Architectural type: Church
- Style: Georgian, Classical
- Years built: 1841-1842, 1912-1913
- Completed: 1842

Victorian Heritage Register
- Official name: St Johns Lutheran Church, (formerly St Andrews Presbyterian Church)
- Type: Registered place
- Designated: 11 March 1987
- Reference no.: H0656
- Heritage overlay no.: HO266
- Category: Religion

St John's Lutheran Church is a Lutheran church located in Geelong, Victoria, Australia. Completed in 1842 with later additions, it is one of the oldest church buildings in Victoria, originally functioning as the first Presbyterian church in Geelong, then as a hall, and presently as a Lutheran church.

== History ==
Many of Geelong's first settlers were Presbyterians, and the first Presbyterian service in Victoria was conducted in the residence of Dr. Alexander Thomson. Prior to the completion of the church, services were held in a shed owned by David Fisher, conducted by the first minister, Andrew Love.

The foundation stone was laid on 22 March 1841 by Dr. Alexander Thomson, and was officially opened on Sunday 11 July 1842. Construction took longer than expected due to the discovery of a fault, and the walls were subsequently rebuilt. Upon opening, the church was simply known as "the Presbyterian Church" before being named "St Andrew's Presbyterian Church" in 1858.

In 1911, due to there being many active Presbyterian churches in the Geelong town centre, it was decided to move further away from the Yarra Street site, and to a newly constructed church in Sydney Avenue, East Geelong.

In 1912, the church building was acquired by the Scottish Society "Comunn-na-Feinne". Between 1912 and 1913 the original church building was obscured behind a classical-style front addition, designed by Geelong architects Laird and Buchan. The soprano Marjorie Lawrence won her first singing competition in the building.

Due to dwlindling membership, the Commun-na-Feinne Society was disbanded in 1945. In 1946, the first Lutheran service took place in the building, and on 4 April 1948, the building became an official Lutheran place of worship.

=== Organ ===
The organ was built by Andrew Fuller in 1866-1867 and was first installed in the Howard Street Methodist Church, West Melbourne, and then moved to Holy Trinity Anglican Church, Kensington, and then finally to its present location in the church in 1972.
