= List of amusement parks in Oceania =

The following is a list of amusement parks in Oceania sorted by region.

== Australia ==
=== Australian Capital Territory ===
==== Canberra ====
- Corin Forest Recreational Playground
- Downunderland (defunct)

=== New South Wales ===
- Green Valley Farm, Tingha
- Magic Mountain, Merimbula
- Scenic World, Katoomba
- Thredbo Alpine Resort, Thredbo
- Ton-O-Fun, Forster
- Jamberoo Action Park
- Big Banana Fun Park, Coffs Harbour

==== Sydney ====
- Adventure Golf at Panthers World of Entertainment Complex
- Fox Studios Australia (was part of Royal Agricultural Society Showground), Moore Park
- KAOS-Indoor Amusement arcade
- Luna Park Sydney
- Manly Waterworks
- Sega World Sydney (defunct)
- Royal Easter Show, Homebush
- The Train Shed, Luddenham (defunct)
- Wonderland City (aka: Bondi Aquarium)
- Wonderland Sydney (defunct)

=== Queensland ===
- Paronella Park

==== Sunshine Coast ====
- Aussie World
- Nostalgia Town

==== Brisbane ====
- Tops, an amusement park (1988–2000) located on the top floor of The Myer Centre Brisbane
- World Expo Park, an amusement park built for Expo 88 and closed in 1989

==== Gold Coast ====
- Dreamworld, has the third tallest free-falling ride in the world at 120 metres (39 stories) high, The Giant Drop
- Sea World
- Warner Bros. Movie World, home to the third steepest roller coaster drop in the world at 120.5 degrees, Green Lantern Coaster
- Wet'n'Wild Gold Coast
- WhiteWater World

=== South Australia ===
- Adelaide Showgrounds, Adelaide
- Dazzeland, Adelaide (defunct)

==== Glenelg ====
- Luna Park Glenelg (defunct)
- Magic Mountain (replaced by The Beachouse)

=== Victoria ===
- Adventure Park, Geelong
- Funfields, Whittlesea
- Gumbuya World, Tynong (Formerly Gumbuya Park)
- Fairy Park, Geelong
- Hi-Lite Park, Geelong (defunct)
- Studio 31 (Countdown), Ripponlea (defunct 1986)
- Luna Park, Melbourne
- Melbourne Showgrounds, Ascot Vale
- Wobbies World, Nunawading (defunct)
- Wonderland Fun Park, Melbourne (defunct)
- Wonderland Junior, Melbourne
- Kryal Castle, Ballarat
- Sovereign hill, Ballarat

=== Western Australia ===
- Adventure World, Bibra Lake
- The Great Escape Amusement Park, Hillarys
- Kalamunda Water Park, Kalamunda
- Perth Royal Showgrounds, Claremont

== New Zealand ==
- Auckland Adventure Park, Stillwater, Auckland
- Crystal Mountain, Henderson Valley, Auckland
- Rainbow's End, Manukau, Auckland

== See also ==
- List of amusement parks
- List of water parks in Oceania
