= Hi-Lite Park =

Amusement park in Geelong, Australia (1956–1985)

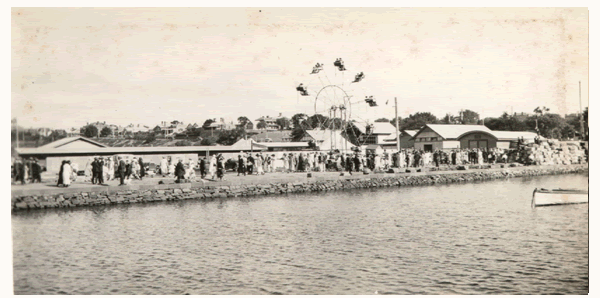
- Interactive map of Hi-Lite Park
- Location: Geelong, Victoria, Australia, Australia
- Coordinates: 38.146°S 144.367°E
- Opened: 1956
- Closed: 1985
- Operating season: All year round

Hi-Lite Park was an amusement park in Geelong, Australia, located near Eastern Beach, on the corner of Bellarine Street and Ritchie Boulevard, where the Eastern Beach tram terminus was once situated. The park opened in 1956 and closed c. 1985.

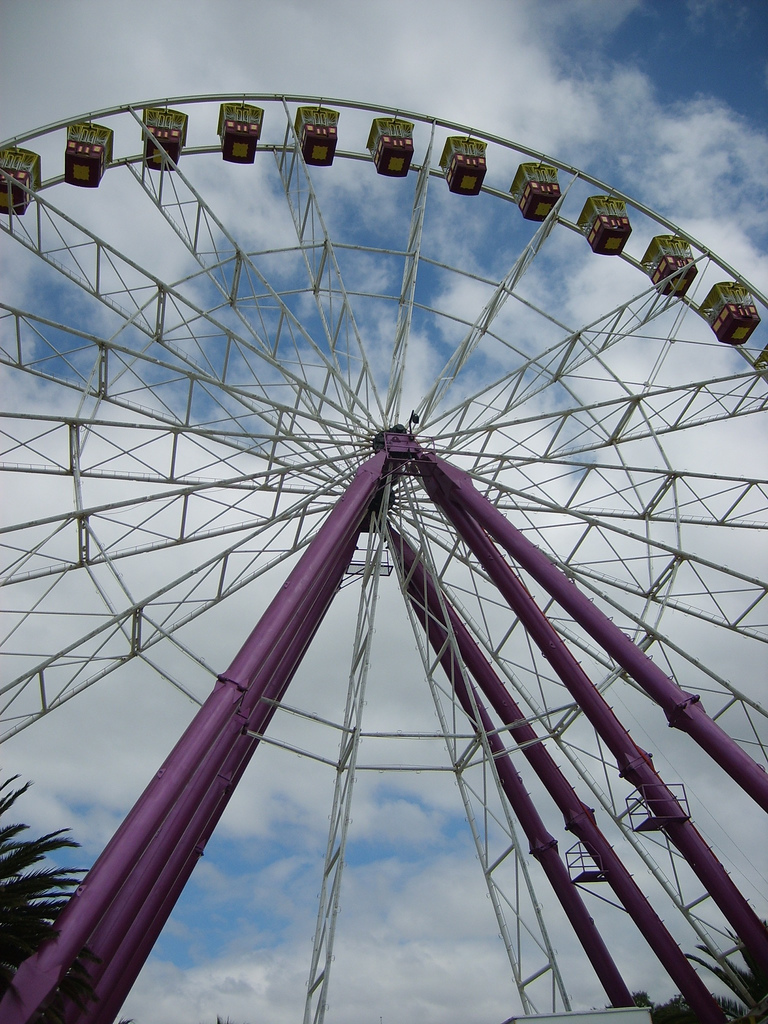
Ferris wheel in February 2007

It was a very popular foreshore attraction in Geelong, comparable to Luna Park, Melbourne, but was closed to make way for the new redevelopment of the Eastern Beach precinct in the 1990s.

== Ferris wheel ==
In December 2006, a Ferris wheel, reported to be the largest non-permanent wheel in the southern hemisphere, was erected in the same area in which Hi-Lite Park once stood. The wheel had been renovated by Phoenix Fabrication & Welding of Geelong, which enlarged the gondolas. There were 36 gondolas, each with capacity to seat six people. It had a 50-metre peak clearance and each ride was 10–12 minutes in duration.

It was imported by the Verfurth family, who ran Hi-Lite Amusements, having also operated Hi-Lite Park under the ownership of first-generation showman Emile Francis Verfurth, who resided in Braybrook, Victoria, and evidently moved his carnival to various sites around Victoria.

== External Images ==
- Hy-Lite Park 1960
- 11064a205ba.aspx View across Geelong's waterfront amusement park, undated
- Only Melbourne
