= G-class tram =

G-class tram may refer to:

- G-class Melbourne tram, to be introduced from 2025
- G-class Sydney tram, built 1899

== See also ==
- G type Adelaide tram
