= List of water parks in Oceania =

The following is a list of water parks in Oceania sorted by region.

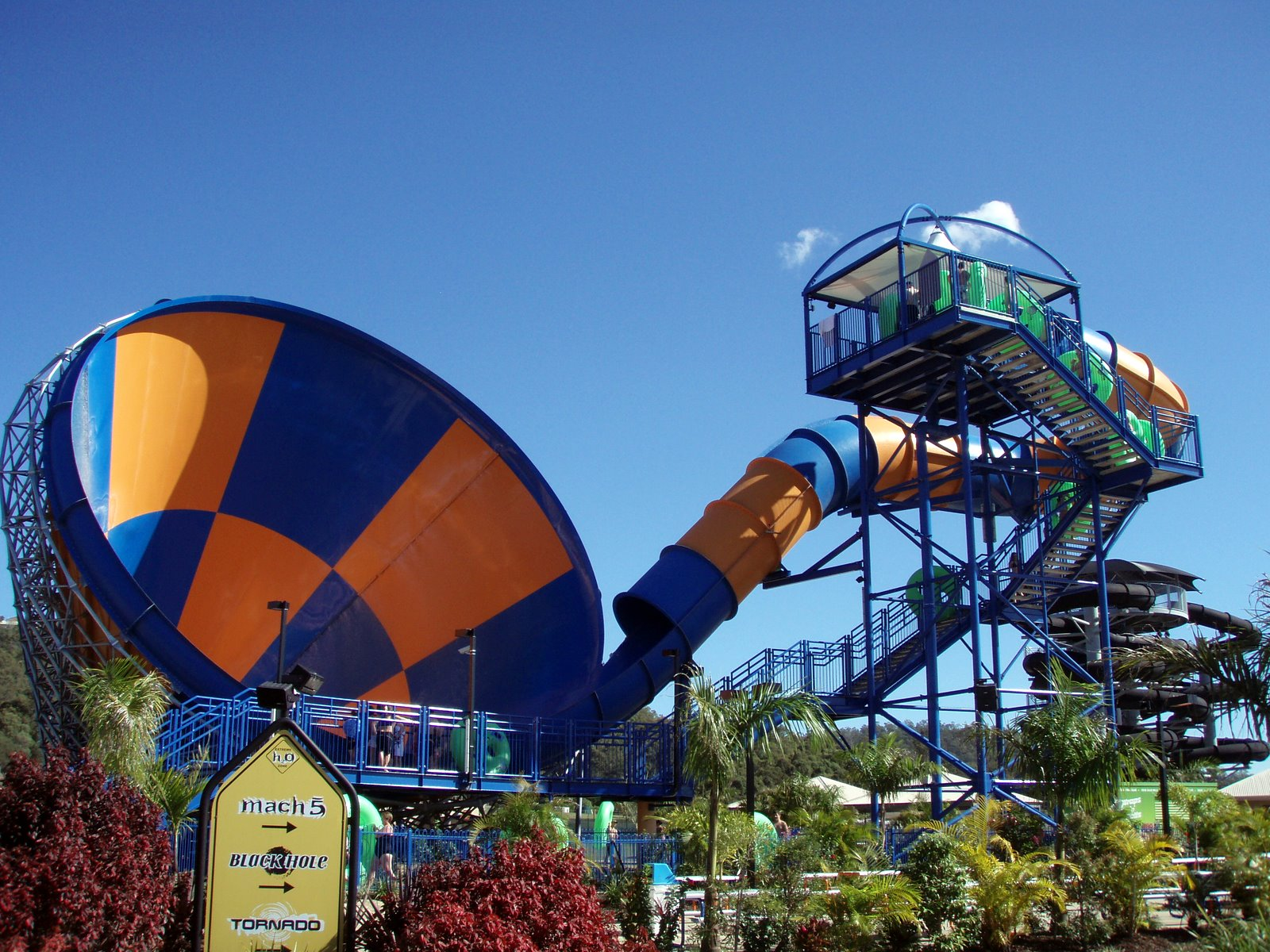
Wet'n'Wild Water World's Tornado

== Australia ==
=== Australian Capital Territory ===
- Big Splash, Canberra

=== New South Wales ===
- Jamberoo Action Park, Jamberoo
- Raging Waters Sydney, Prospect
- The Big Banana Fun Park, Coffs Harbour
- Ton-O-Fun, Forster

=== Queensland ===
- Sugarworld
- Wet'n'Wild Gold Coast, Gold Coast
- WhiteWater World, Gold Coast (part of Dreamworld)

=== South Australia ===
- The Beachouse, Adelaide

=== Victoria ===
- Adventure Park, Geelong
- Funfields, Whittlesea
- Gumbuya World, Tyong

=== Western Australia ===
- Adventure World, Perth

== Guam ==
- Onward Water Park, Tamuning
- Tarza Waterpark, Tamuning

== New Zealand ==
- Aquatic Park Parakai Springs, Auckland
- Splash Planet, Hastings
- Taupo DeBretts Hot Springs, Taupō
- Waiwera Hot Pools, Auckland, closed in 2018
- Waterworld, Hamilton

== See also ==
- List of water parks
- List of amusement parks in Oceania
