= Adventure Park (disambiguation) =

An adventure park is a recreational place.

Adventure Park may also refer to:

- Adventure Park, Geelong, Victoria, Australia
- Adventure Park, Kollam, Kerala, India
- Adventure Park USA, Monrovia, Maryland, United States

== See also ==
- Adventure Parc Snowdonia, Dolgarrog, Wales
