= Geelong Carousel =

Victorian era merry-go-round in Australia

Coordinates: 38°08′37″S 144°21′47″E

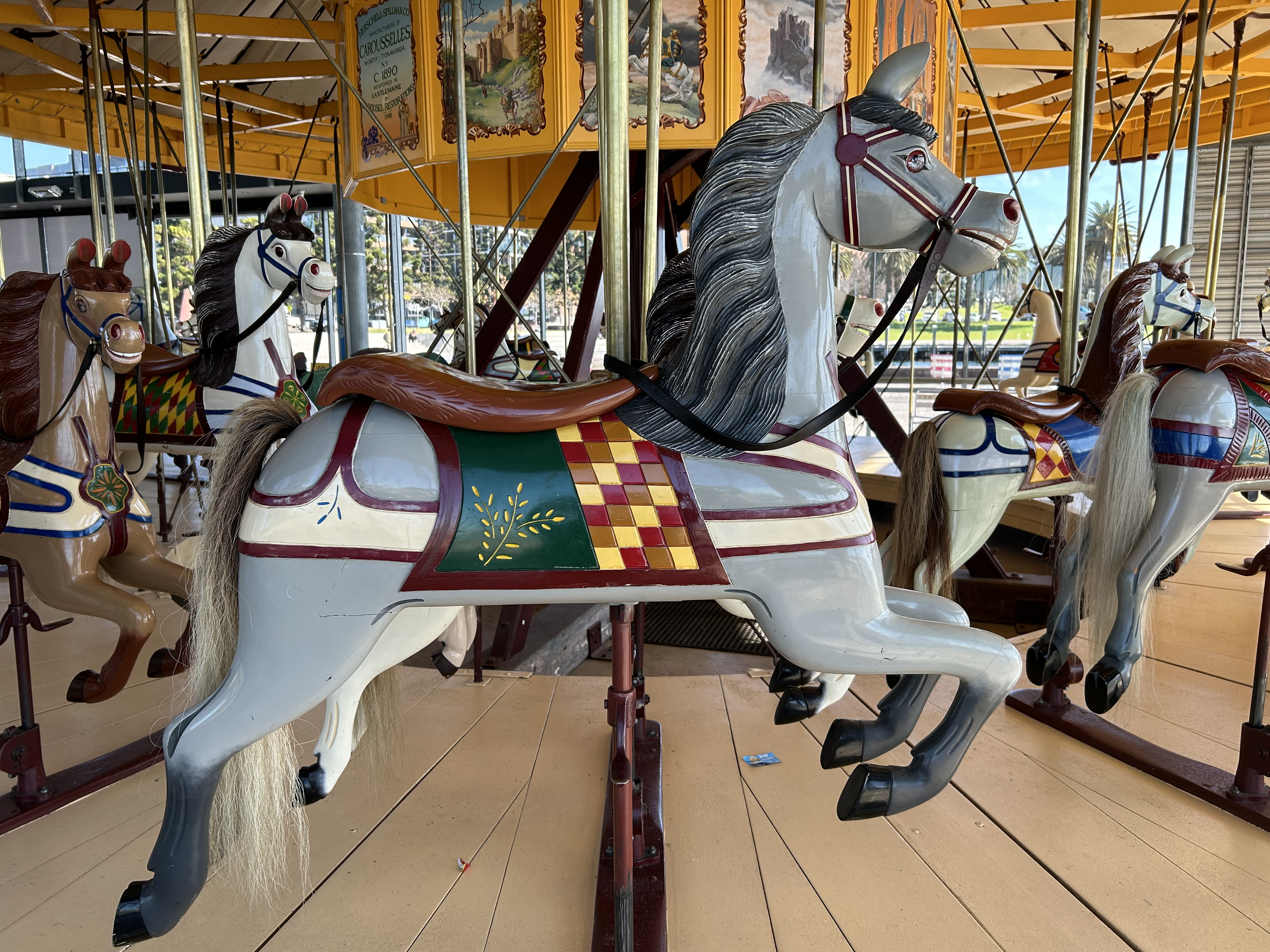
- Hand-carved carousel horse

Geelong Waterfront, Victoria, Australia
- Status: Operating
- Opening date: 14 October 2000

Ride statistics
- Attraction type: Carousel
- Manufacturer: Armitage-Herschell
- Originally manufactured: 1892
- Website: Official website

The Geelong Carousel is a fully-restored Victorian era carousel (or merry-go-round), that operates in a custom-built pavilion on the waterfront in Geelong, Victoria, Australia. It is owned and operated by the City of Greater Geelong. The carousel and its original steam engine were purchased and restored between 1996 and 2000, as part of the redevelopment of the Geelong Waterfront. A steel-framed glass pavilion building was designed and constructed to provide permanent housing for the carousel. The restored carousel was officially opened in its new pavilion on 14 October 2000. The Carousel Pavilion is now regarded as a landmark and symbol of the refurbishment of the Geelong waterfront.

== History ==
The carousel was manufactured in New York by the Armitage–Herschell company in c. 1892. It saw a period of service in New York before being shipped to Australia in the 1920s. It was operated as an amusement ride in a carnival at the seaside town of Mordialloc, Victoria from c. 1920 to c. 1950. The carousel was eventually dismantled and stored in a field at Echuca, Victoria. It was then sold at auction and stored at Castlemaine. The carousel was bought by a vintage car restorer, Rick Furlong. With assistance from the State Government of Victoria, the City of Greater Geelong purchased the carousel and funded its restoration, as part of the redevelopment of the Geelong Waterfront. Furlong was engaged as part of the team to organize the restoration of the carousel in the late 1990s.

The restored carousel was officially opened in its new pavilion on 14 October 2000. In 2023/24, the carousel had the highest attendance for 15 years with over 41,000 rides.

== Description ==
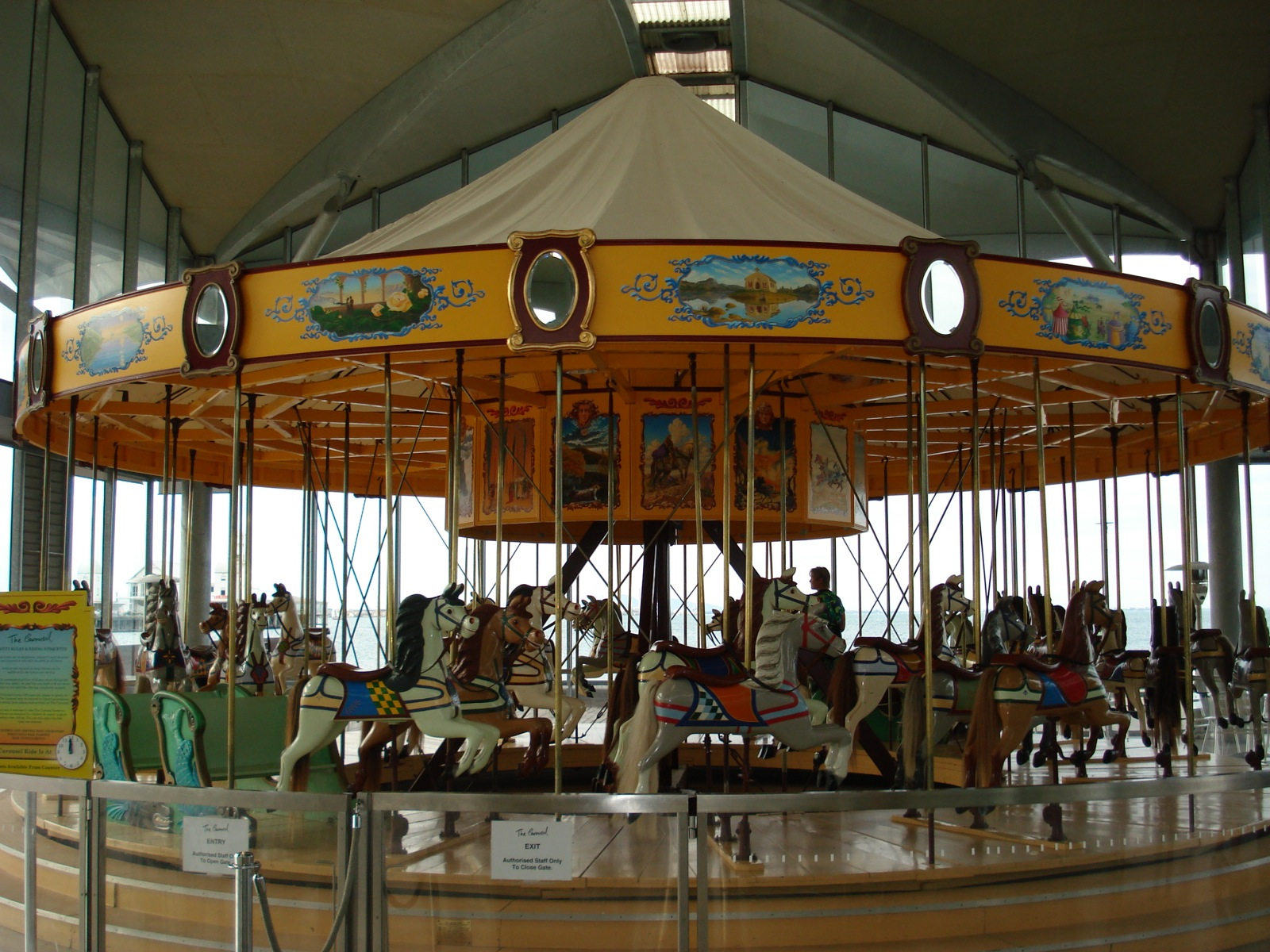
Geelong Carousel

The carousel is 10 m (33 ft) in diameter and approximately 6 m (20 ft) tall. It has 36 wooden jumper horses and 2 chariot seats. The original horses, of which 24 remain on the carousel, are believed to have been hand-carved by the American master carver, Charles Dare.

== Restoration ==
The restoration of the carousel took 3 years, at a cost of around AUD$300,000, with around 300 hours spent on restoring each of the original horses. The twelve horses needed to make up the complete set were built using techniques as close as possible to the original manufacturing methods. Timber for the new horses was imported from the United States. The two chariot seats are reproductions, based on originals in the United States.

The restoration work includes 49 art works that were specifically designed for the carousel rounding boards and scenery panels, taking inspiration from the legends of King Arthur.

Some of the restoration work on the carousel was carried out in former wool store buildings on the Geelong Waterfront. These buildings are now home to Deakin University.

== Carousel Pavilion ==
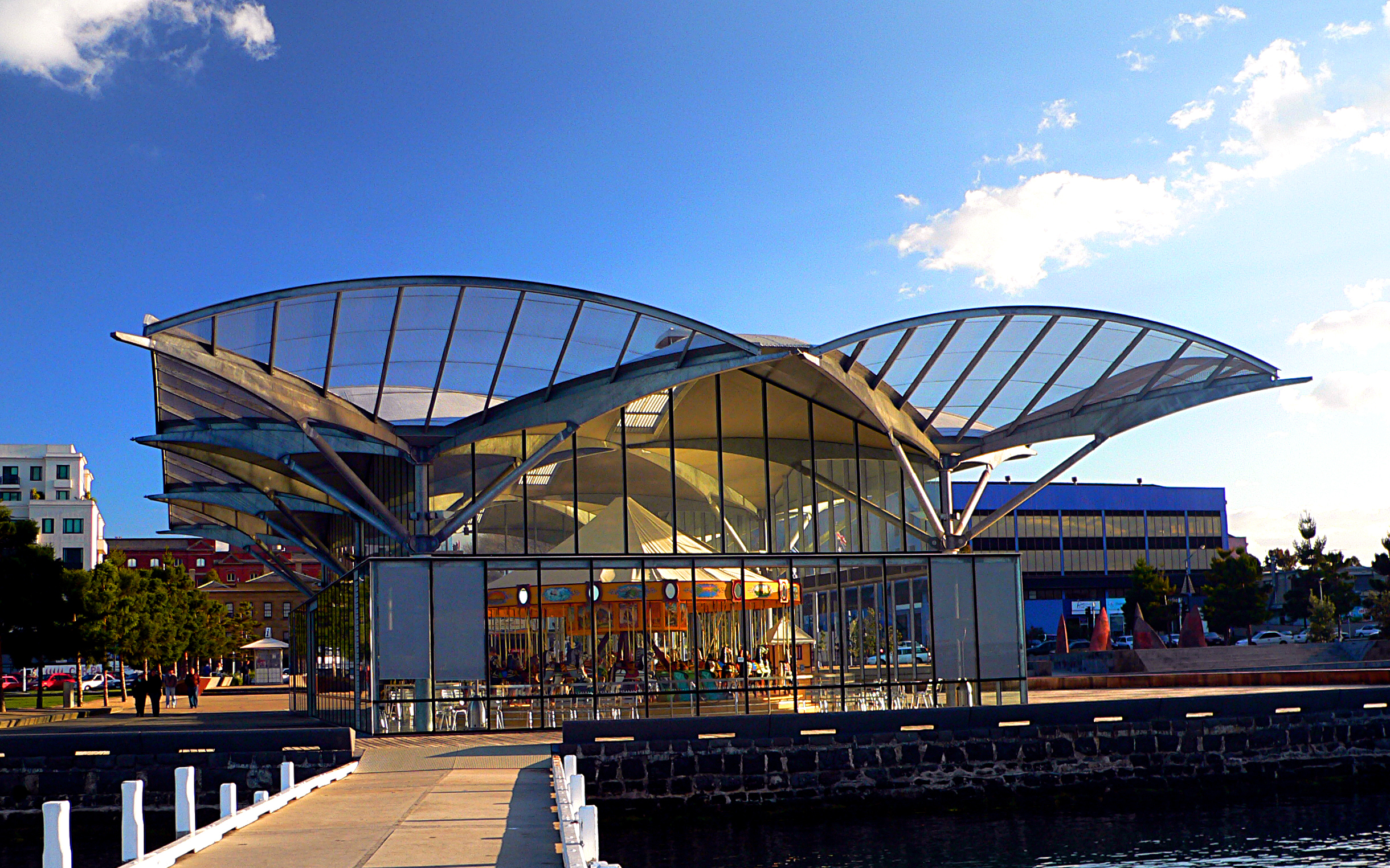
Carousel Pavilion

Prior to 1996, the north-facing shore of Corio Bay in Geelong was mostly utlised by maritime and general industry. The Steampacket Place Development Board was formed as a joint team by the Victorian State Government and the City of Greater Geelong to undertake a major redevelopment of the Geelong waterfront, as a stimulus for the local economy and to attract visitors.

As part of the redevelopment project, the Steampacket Place Development Board purchased the carousel in 1996, to become a feature of the waterfront. The building that houses the carousel was designed by the Australian architectural practice McGlashan Everist, and built on a waterfront site adjacent to Steampacket Gardens. The design of the pavilion is a transparent steel-framed glass box with a roof structure of six umbrella forms in an arrangement of three by two. Each umbrella form is 12 x 12 metres. The Carousel Pavilion is now regarded as a landmark and symbol of the refurbishment of the Geelong waterfront.

== Access ==
The Carousel Pavilion is open all year-round, and entry is free. Rides on the carousel are AUD$5, as of 2024. A waterfront visitor information centre is located inside the pavilion, and the building is also used for hosting events and functions.

== Steam engine ==
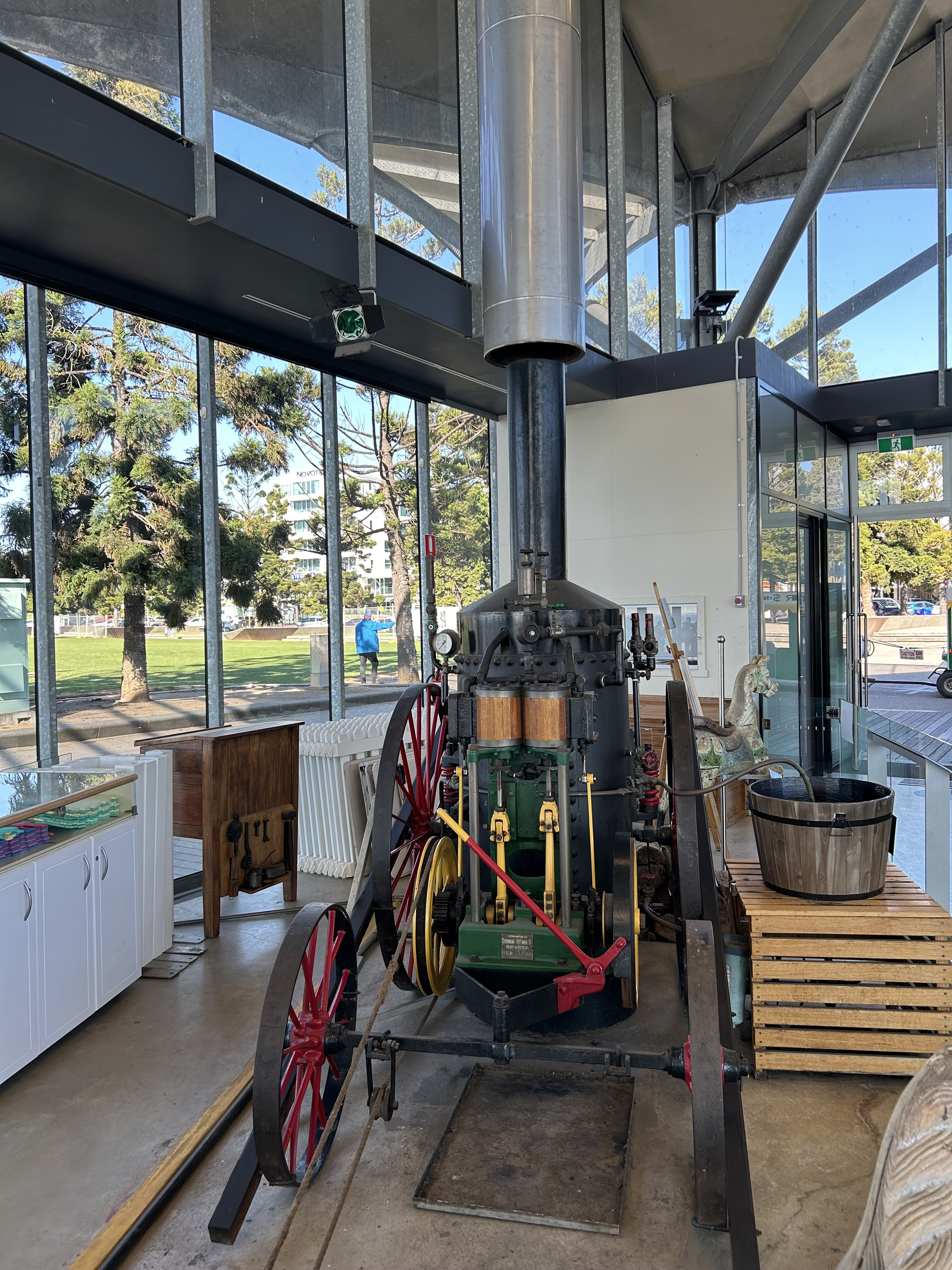
Carousel steam engine

The carousel was originally designed to be portable and had its own mechanical power source — a steam engine mounted on a four-wheeled horse-drawn carriage. The original steam engine for the carousel was manufactured by Herschell-Spillman in New York in 1890. It was used to drive the carousel until it was replaced by electric power in the 1920s. As part of the restoration of the carousel, the original steam engine was located in Sydney, purchased, and brought to Geelong. The steam engine is believed to be one of only five similar units in the world. Steam is raised in a wood-fired vertical fire-tube boiler and supplies a twin-cylinder vertical double-acting steam engine. Mechanical power to drive the carousel is provided from a pulley on the steam engine via a rope belt to a large pulley beneath the rotating deck of the carousel. The boiler and steam engine were restored in 1999, and installed in the pavilion. The carousel is driven by an electric motor, but the steam engine is operated periodically for demonstration purposes.

== Awards ==
In the Australian Steel Construction Industry Awards 2002, the Carousel Pavilion won the Victorian Architectural Award, and a commendation in the Premier Award category. In 2003 the pavilion won the Victorian Coastal Council Award for Excellence, Building and Design. In the Geelong Advertiser Business Excellence Awards 2004, the Geelong Carousel won the New and Emerging Business Award, and also won the Attractions, Events & Services Award in the same awards in 2006.
