= Trams in Geelong =

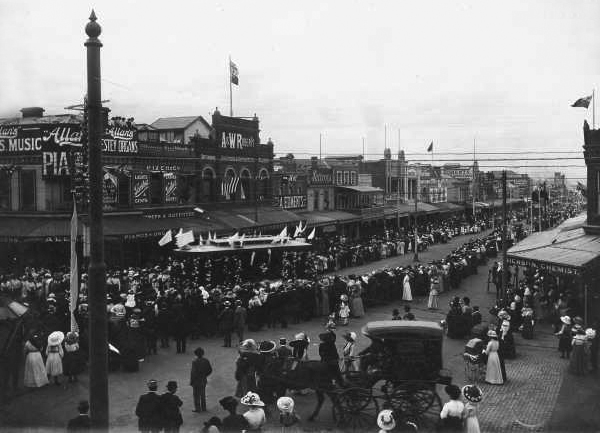
Opening of the Geelong Tramway in 1912

The city of Geelong in Victoria, Australia, operated an extensive tramway system from 1912 until 1956, when the service was replaced by buses. Unlike Victoria's other major regional cities, Ballarat and Bendigo, which have kept some track and trams as tourist attractions, no trams or tracks remain in Geelong.

== History ==
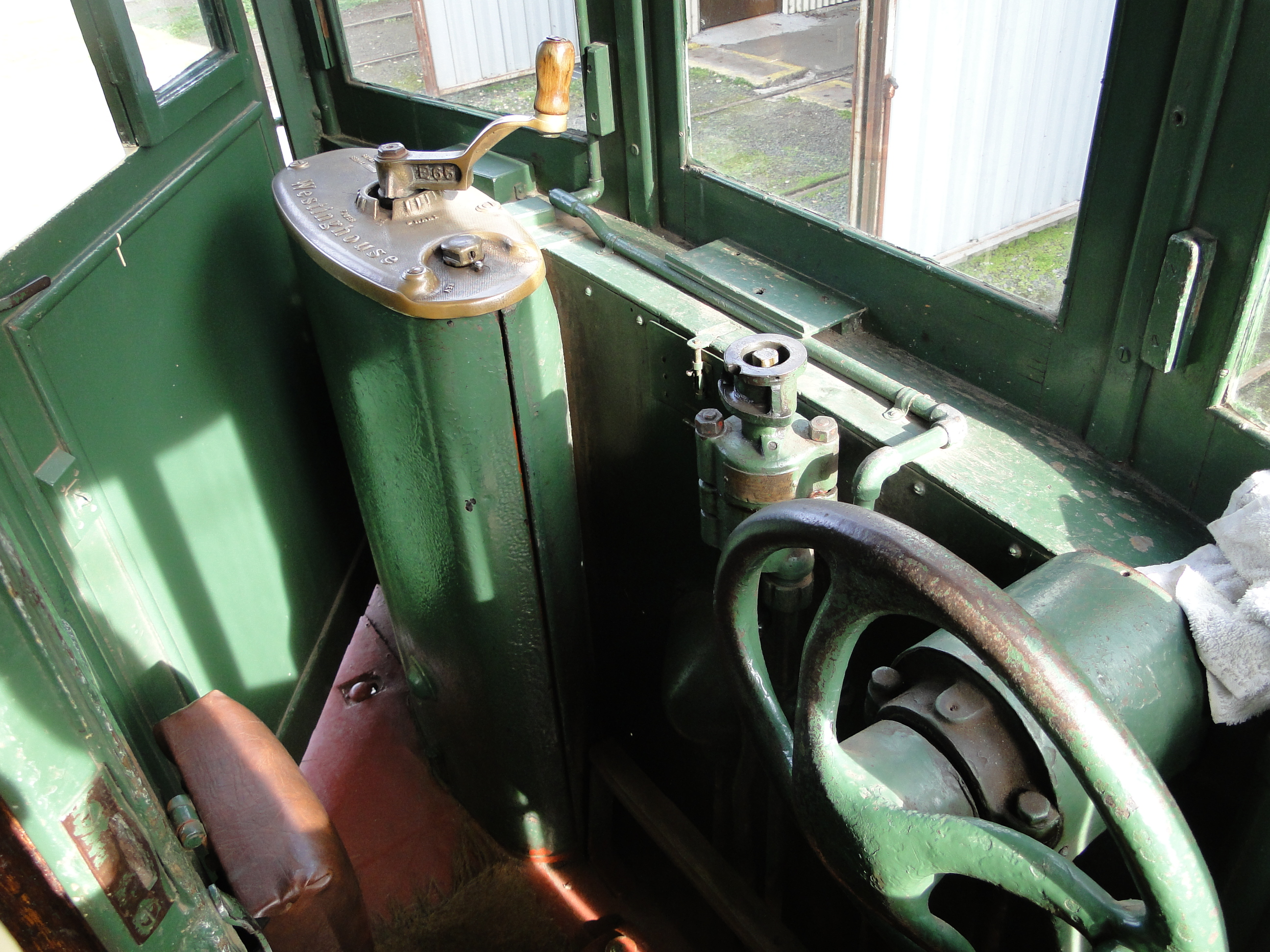
Geelong Tram No. 29, driver's cabin

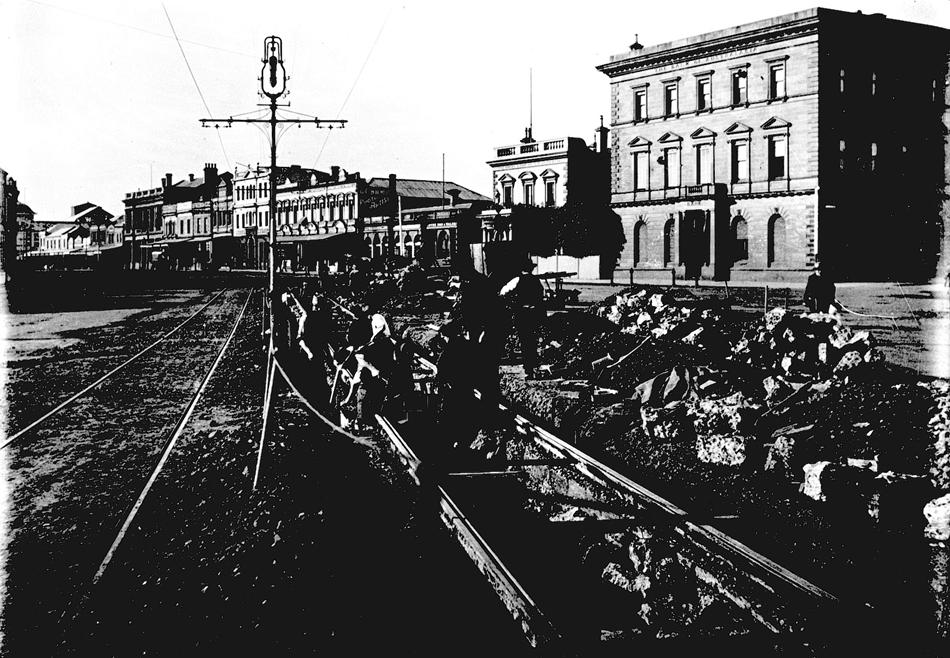
Laying tracks in Malop Street, 1912

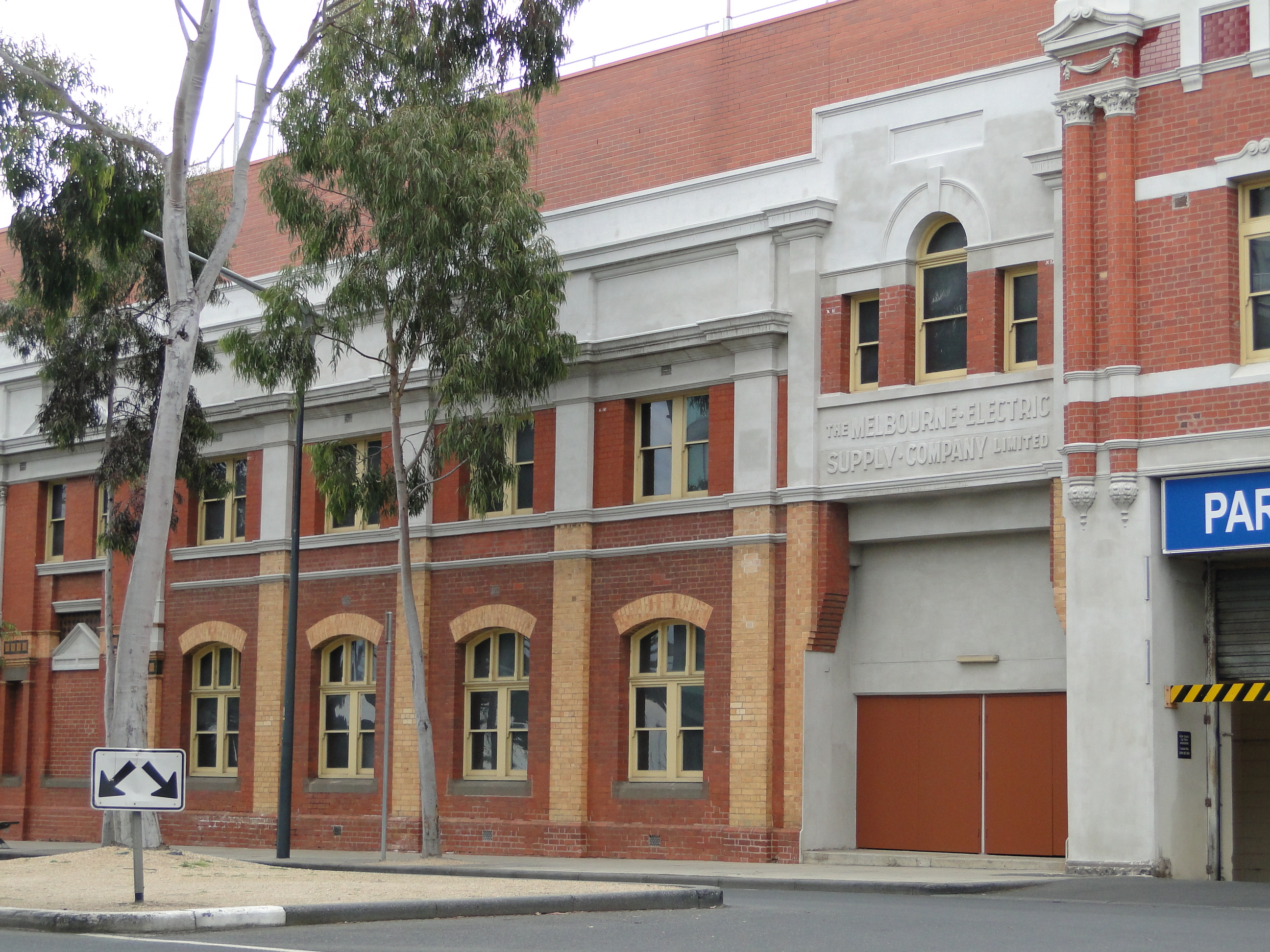
Entrance to the former Geelong Tram Depot in Brougham Street

There had been proposals to build a tram network in Geelong as early as 1888. Two companies, the Geelong Electric Light, Electric Motor, Electric Tram and Omnibus Company, and the Geelong and District Electric Tramway Company Limited, attended a meeting to get support for their plans in June 1888. After lengthy discussions, and the need to get State Government approval, a plan was finally accepted by the Geelong Town Council in 1890. However the economic depression which occurred after the collapse of the 1880s Land Boom, led to the plans being cancelled in 1891. Further agitation for a tramway started again in 1906, but it took until July 1910 before agreement was reached with the Melbourne Electric Supply Company for the construction and operation of a tram system. The company would have the lease on the trams for a period of 30 years.

Construction began in December 1910, and part of the line was first tested on 10 January 1912 in front of a large crowd. The Geelong tram network was officially opened on 14 March 1912 with bands, huge crowds, and a procession of four highly decorated trams. Official passengers on the trams included the Mayor of Geelong, the Mayor of Newtown and Chilwell, the Mayor of Geelong West, other councillors, directors of the company, and state politicians. At each municipal boundary permission was asked for the trams to enter, and a ribbon was cut.

== Line openings ==
| Route | Details | Opening Date |
|---|---|---|
| Wharf | City to north end of Moorabool St | 1912-03-14 |
| Station | City to Geelong station via Malop St | 1912-03-14 |
| West | City to Pakington/Church St via Ryrie St | 1912-03-14 |
| Newtown | Pakington/Aberdeen St to Aphrasia St/Shannon Ave | 1912-03-14 |
| South | Moorabool/Ryrie St to Moorabool/Fyans St | 1913 |
| South | Moorabool/Fyans St to Barwon Bridge | December 1913 |
| East | Moorabool/Ryrie St to Garden/Ryrie St | 1922-10-12 |
| East | Garden/Ryrie St to Humble St/Ormond Rd | 1923-01-25 |
| East | Humble St/Ormond Rd to Boundary/Ormond Rd | 1923-03-01 |
| Chilwell | Pakington/Aphrasia St to Pakington/Fyans St | 1927-09-30 |
| Belmont | Barwon Bridge to Roslyn Rd/Colac Rd | 1927-12-16 |
| North | Mercer/Malop St to Bell Pde/Melbourne Rd | 1928-07-06 |
| North | Bell Parade to Victoria St/Melbourne Rd | 1929-06-14 |
| North | Victoria St./Melbourne Rd to Separation St/Melbourne Rd | 1929-12-20 |
| Eastern Park | Ryrie/Garden St to Humble St/Portarlington Rd | 1930-09-10 |
| Beach | Depot to Corio Tce/Bellarine St | 1940-10-19 |

== Duplications ==
| Route | Details | Date |
|---|---|---|
| City | Moorabool St. from Malop to Ryrie St | 1912-03-14 |
| Station | Malop St to Geelong station | 1914 |
| Wharf | Moorabool/Malop St to Moorabool St Wharf | 1914 |
| East/West | Garden St/Ryrie St to Latrobe Tce/Ryrie St | 1923 |
| West | Latrobe Tce/Ryrie St to Aberdeen/Pakington St | April 1929 |
| North | Mercer St to Victoria St/Melbourne Rd | 1929/1930 |
| Depot | Long loop in Corio Tce | May 1929 |

== Deviation ==
| Route | Details | Date |
|---|---|---|
| Newtown | Retreat Rd/Pleasant St to Pakington St/Aphrasia St | 1914 |

== Change of ownership ==
In 1930 the tramways were taken over by the State Electricity Commission of Victoria (SEC). This was part of the SEC taking over the supply of electricity for Victoria, and it included the tramways in Geelong, Bendigo and Ballarat. A tramway extension to Eastern Beach opened in October 1940 along Bellarine Street to cater to beach goers.

During World War II, passenger traffic increased as a result of petrol rationing and people employed in munitions factories around Geelong. In 1943 the trams carried 6,500,000 people. Because of the shortage of men to work on the trams, the SEC decided to employ women to work as conductors.

== Closure ==
In 1949, H.H. Bell jnr., the son of the chairman of the Melbourne and Metropolitan Tramways Board, prepared a report on the Geelong tramways for the Geelong City Council. He found that the trams were obsolete, and could not be run profitably in a city with only 52,000 people. The Council accepted his findings by nine votes to one. The Australian Road Safety Council had identified trams as being "Australia's number one road menace", alleging that they were 16 times more likely to be involved in accidents than motor vehicles.

In 1953, a government report recommended replacing the trams with buses. The Liberal state government of Henry Bolte, elected in June 1955, decided in July that the trams should be replaced by privately owned buses as soon as possible. Bolte described the Geelong tramway as being outdated and hopelessly inadequate. The SEC argued that the cost of tickets did not cover the cost of wages, and certainly did not meet the cost of maintenance or electricity. It was estimated that the tram system was losing £95,000 each year, and needed to have £2,000,000 spent on it to upgrade the tracks and tramcars. Tramway union members argued that the SEC had let the system run down, and that it was losing business by not extending the network into new suburban areas. The Geelong Chamber of Commerce supported the closure of the system, with the president saying they would be glad to have the trams off the streets. Protest meetings were held to try and save the trams, without success.

The last tram ran from the city to Belmont and back on 25 March 1956. Thousands of people were in the streets to celebrate the event. The tram which ran the last service was Geelong No.4. It had made the first test run on the system on 12 January 1912.

Over the years, there have been proposals to bring trams back into the city, but the idea has never been looked at seriously.

== Routes ==
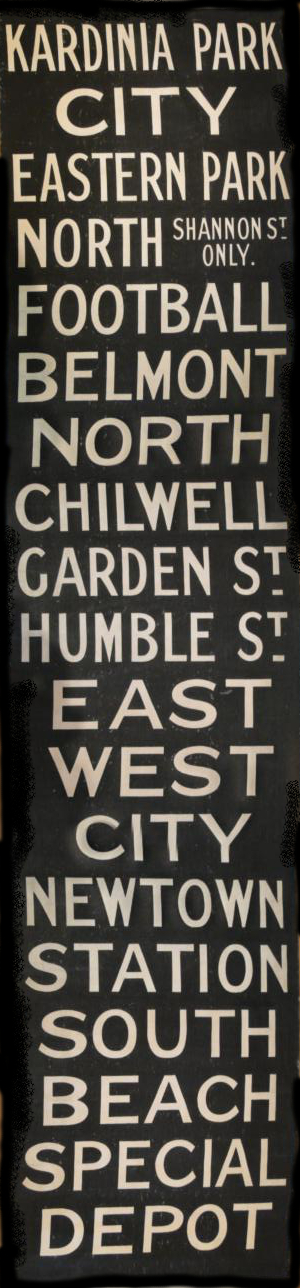
Geelong tram destination roll

Immediately following World War II, the following services were through-routed:

- Newtown – Railway/Beach
- West – Railway/Beach
- Belmont – North
- East Geelong – Chilwell

After a timetable reorganisation in December 1952, the pattern was altered to:

- North – Belmont
- Newtown – Eastern Park
- West – East
- Chilwell – Station/Beach

== Tram fleet ==
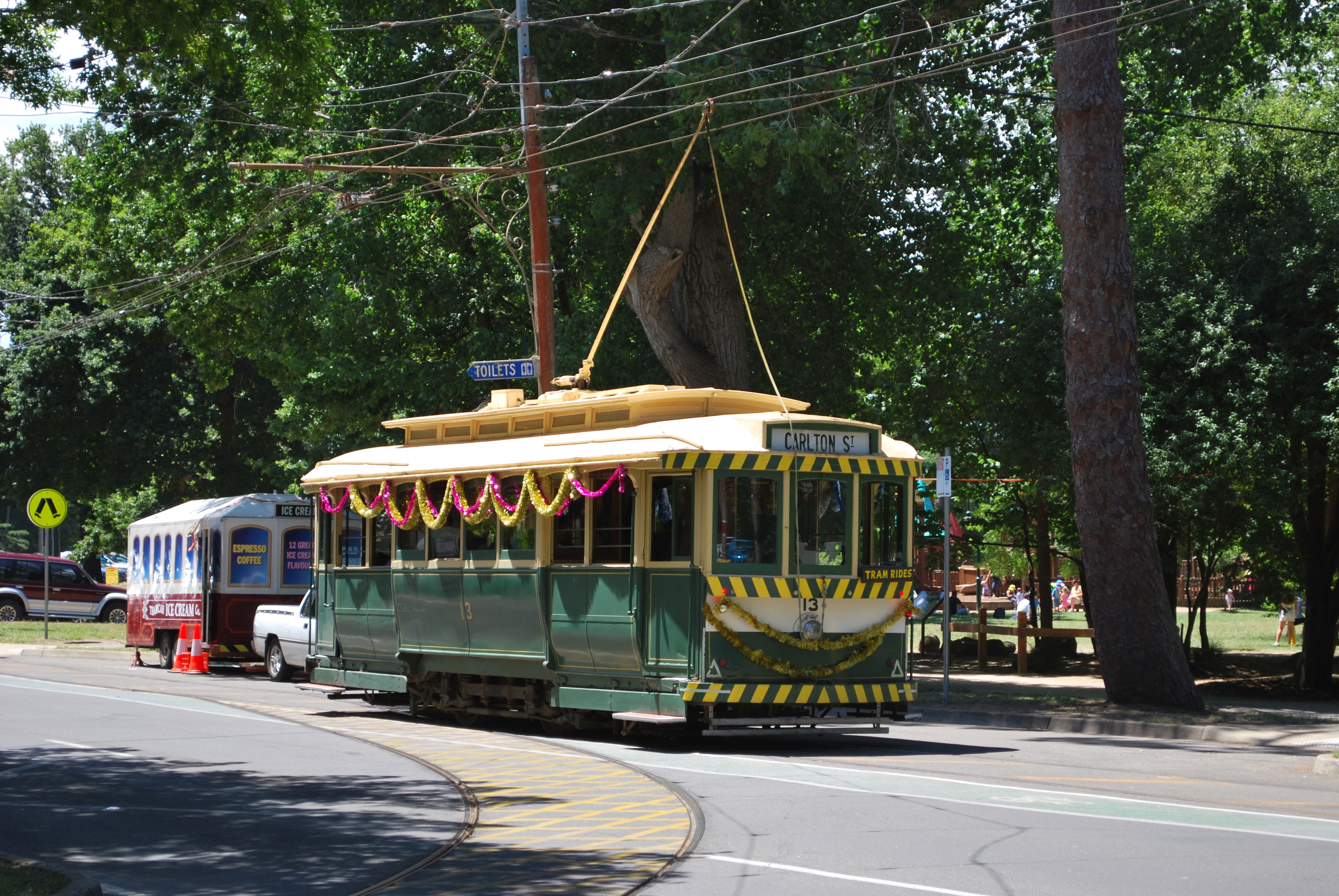
Geelong No. 30, now Ballarat No. 13, at Lake Wendouree, Ballarat

The original fleet of Geelong trams was made up of seven single-truck cars, with bodies made by Duncan & Fraser of Adelaide using Brush trucks. They were assembled in the depot in Corio Terrace (now called Brougham Street). There were also four non-powered trailer cars.

Over the years, a variety of different trams operated on the Geelong network. Their trucks (bogies) were made by Brush Traction (UK) and JG Brill Company (USA), and their bodies were constructed by Brill (USA), Duncan & Fraser (Adelaide), A Pengelly & Co (Adelaide), and Meadowbank Manufacturing Company (Sydney). Trams were moved around the different tramway networks in Victoria. Geelong no.29 was originally built in 1915 for the Prahran and Malvern Tramways Trust, was moved to Geelong in 1928, and was then moved to Ballarat in 1936. When the system closed in 1956, it was running about 30 trams, numbered from 1 to 40.

=== Surviving trams ===
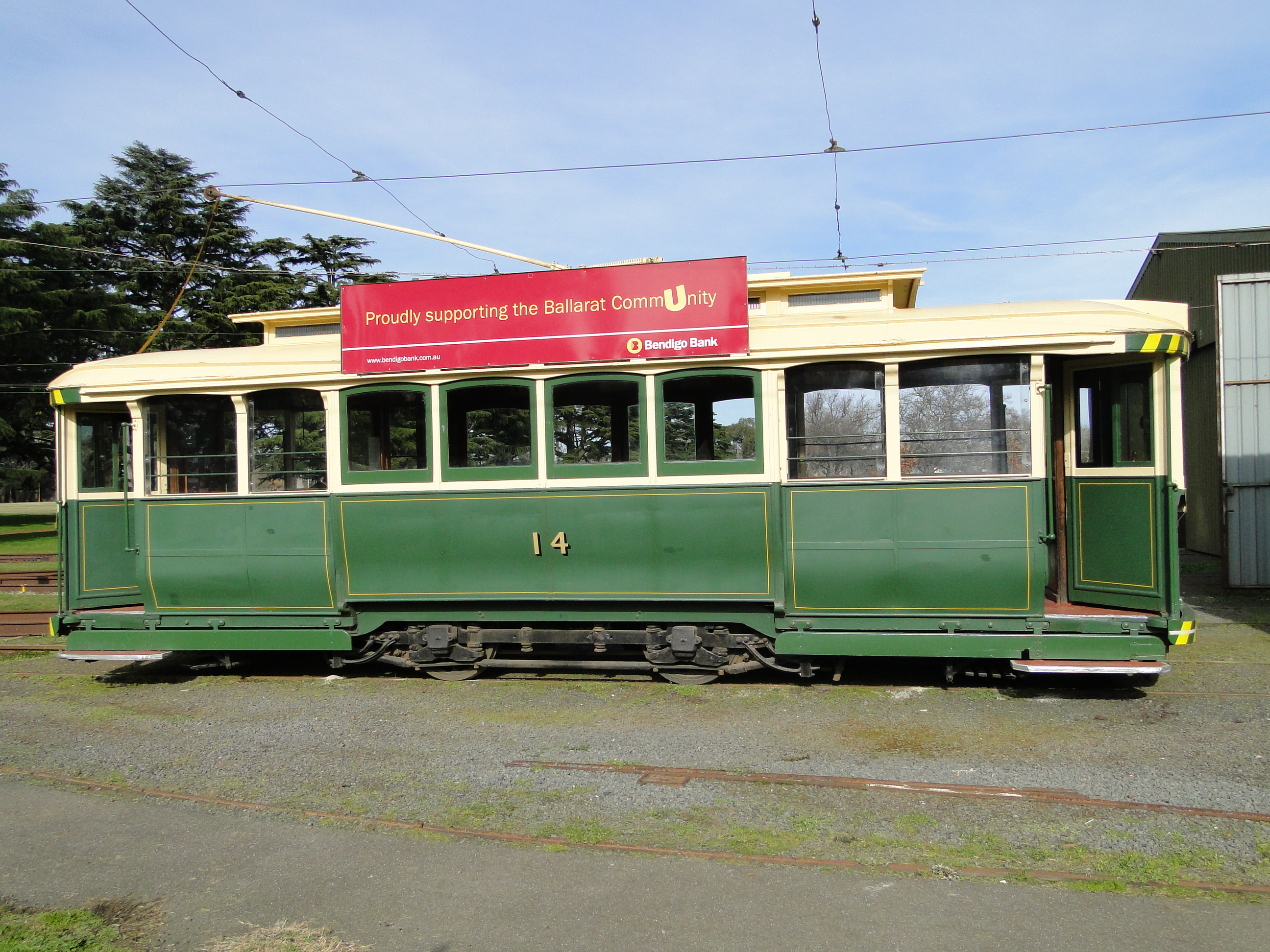
Geelong Tram No. 29, (1915), at the Ballarat Tramway Museum

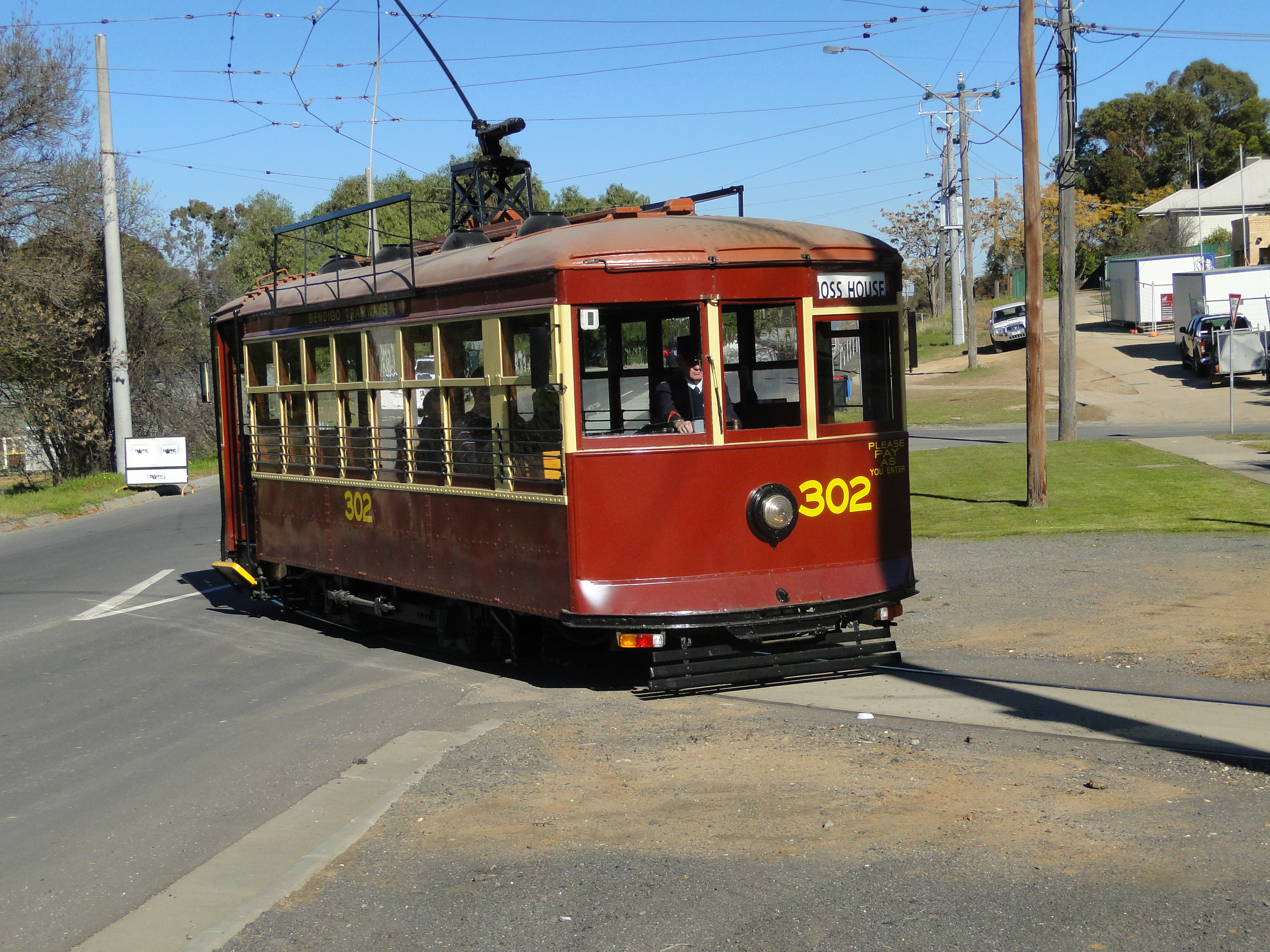
A Adelaide 302, and later Geelong No. 29, enters the terminus at the Joss House in North Bendigo

There are a number of surviving Geelong trams. They are in a number of museums, including the Tramway Museum Society of Victoria collection at Bylands, the Ballarat Tramway Museum, the Bendigo Tramways, and the Sydney Tramway Museum. Several are also privately owned.

- No. 2 (1912) built in Adelaide, South Australia, by Duncan & Fraser, on Brush trucks, now restored at the Ballarat Tramway Museum. It is a so-called butterbox model.
- No. 9 (1915) built in Adelaide, South Australia, by Duncan & Fraser, on Brush trucks, now at Bylands. It is a so-called butterbox model, and is in need of restoration.
- No. 14 (1924) built by JG Brill Company, transferred to Bendigo in 1948, now at Bendigo as Tram 11.
- No. 15 (1924), at Bendigo
- No. 22 (1924), at Bylands. Built by A Pengelly & Co in Adelaide, this tram is in need of restoration.
- No. 28 (1925), body stored at Ballarat
- No. 29 (1915), built by Meadowbank Manufacturing Company for the Prahran & Malvern Tramways Trust and sold to Geelong Tramways in 1928. Moved to Ballarat in 1936 as Tram No. 14 and now in the Ballarat Tramways Museum.
- No. 29 (1925) built by JG Brill Company for the Municipal Tramways Trust, Adelaide, as G class number 302. Operated in Geelong from 1936 as Tram 29 and then transferred to Bendigo in 1947 as Tram 29. Now at Bendigo Tramways, repainted in Adelaide livery and renumbered Adelaide tram 302.
- No. 30 (1915), at Ballarat
- No. 30 (1925), at Bendigo
- No. 32 (1916), at Bendigo
- No. 33 (1916), at Bendigo
- No. 34 (1916), at Bendigo
- No. 35 (1916), at Sydney Tramway Museum
- Mo. 36 (1913), at Bendigo
- No. 40 (1914), at Bylands
