= G type Adelaide tram =

Class of 20th-century tram in Adelaide

G type
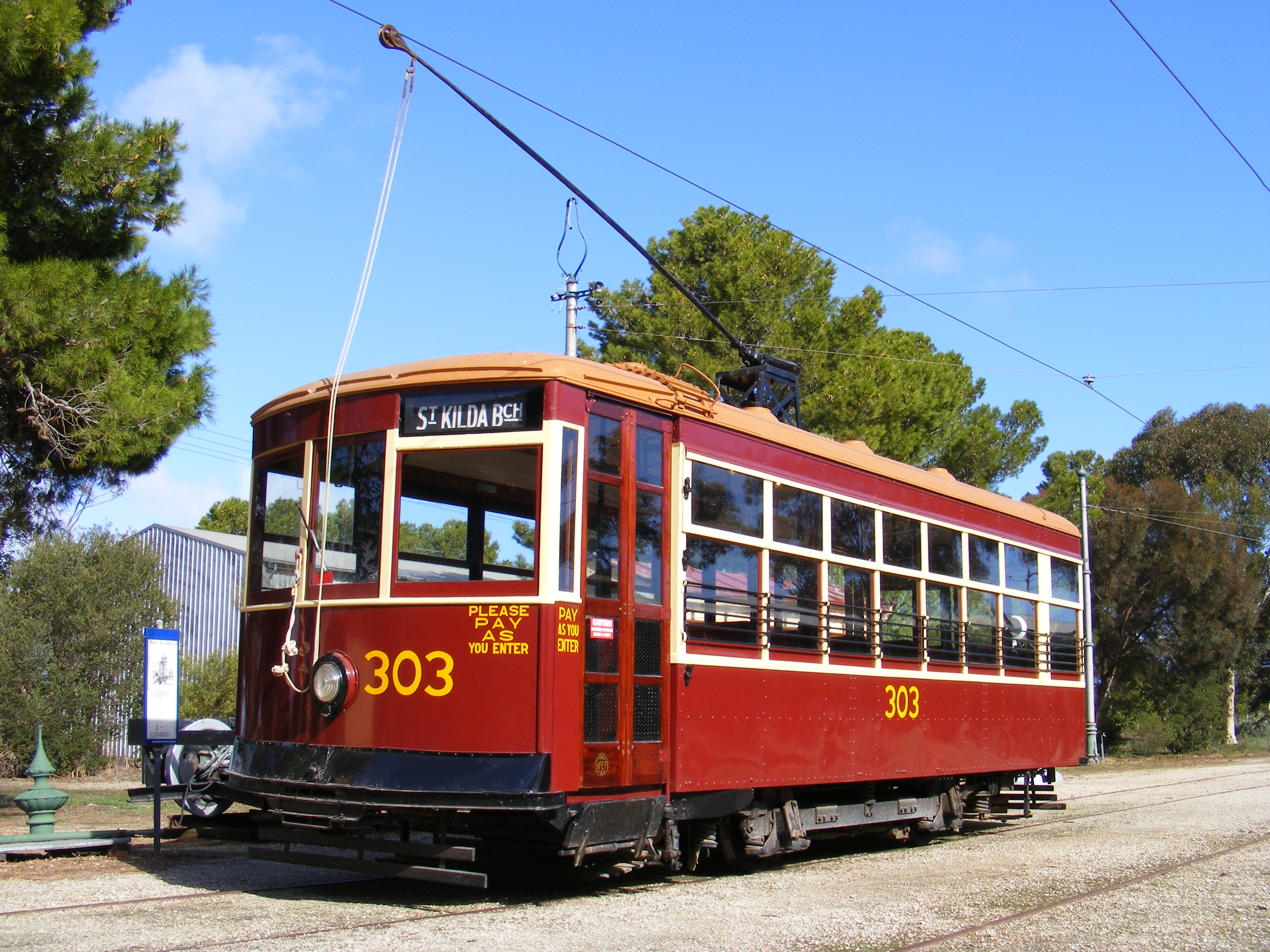
- G303 at the Tramway Museum, St Kilda in May 2008
- Manufacturer: J.G. Brill Company
- Assembly: Adelaide
- Constructed: 1924
- Number built: 4
- Fleet numbers: 301-304
- Capacity: 32

Specifications
- Car length: 8.53 metres
- Width: 2.39 metres
- Height: 3.30 metres
- Weight: 7.6 tons
- Traction motors: 2 x 25hp General Electric 264A
- Current collector(s): Trolley pole
- Bogies: JG Brill Company 79E1
- Track gauge: 1,435 mm (4 ft 8 1/2 in)

The G type Adelaide tram was a class of four single truck Birney trams manufactured by the US firm J.G. Brill Company. They arrived in completely knocked down form and were assembled by the Municipal Tramways Trust in 1924.

They were used exclusively on the isolated Port Adelaide network, mainly on the lightly trafficked Rosewater line to either Semaphiore or Largs. After that closed in 1935, all were sold to the State Electricity Commission of Victoria and placed in service in Geelong. In 1947, they were transferred to Bendigo. One was scrapped in 1956 after an accident, while the other three remained in service until the system closed in April 1972.

== Preservation ==
All are preserved:

- 301, 302 & 304 by the Bendigo Tramway Trust
- 303 by the Tramway Museum, St Kilda
