= Geelong Waterfront =

Waterfront

- Waterfront and esplanade
- {{{other_names}}}
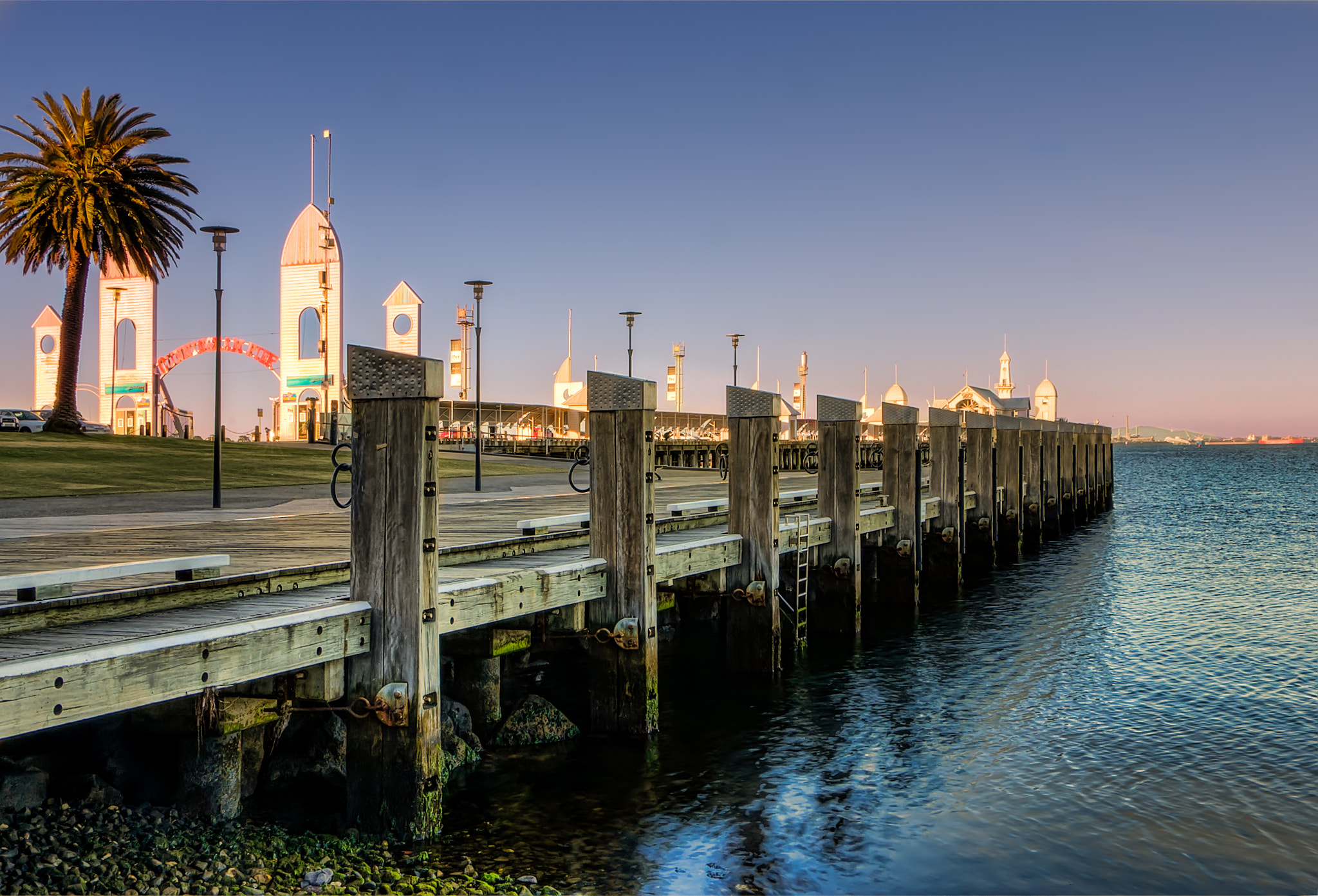
- Owner: City of Greater Geelong
- Location: Geelong
- Location within City of Greater Geelong
- Coordinates: 38.143803°S 144.362718°E

The Geelong Waterfront is a tourist and recreation area on the north facing shores of Corio Bay in Geelong, Australia. The area was once part of the Port of Geelong, falling into disuse before being redeveloped during the 1990s.

== Attractions ==
- The Baywalk Bollards were created by local artist Jan Mitchell in the mid-1990s, with the timber painted sculptures reflecting local history and identities. Over 100 in number, they are installed right around the waterfront between Rippleside and Limeburners Point.
- Deakin University's Waterfront Campus and Costa Hall are located on the western side of the precinct. The campus accommodates around 1500 on-campus students studying programs in Architecture, Construction Management, Nursing and Occupational Therapy.
- Yarra Street Pier is located at the end of Yarra Street and features a number of restaurants, as well as being the departure point for helicopter joyflights. The majority of the pier was destroyed by fire in 1988, but various proposals have been made for the rebuilding.
- The Geelong Flyer operated by Port Phillip Ferries has daily public ferry departures from Geelong (Steampacket Pier) to Docklands on the edge of the Melbourne central business district.
- Cunningham Pier offers 'The Pier' a social venue.
- Steampacket Quay is located at the end of Moorabool Street and provided as sheltered location for ferries, seaplanes and other watercraft.
- The Carousel Pavilion houses a c.1892 Armitage-Herschell steam-driven carousel, c.1888 steam engine and a part-original, part replica 1898 Gavioli Band organ in a modern glass and steel building. The carousel has been restored and consists of 36 horses and 2 chariots. The historic carousel still comprises 24 of the original horses and the rest were built again. It was originally built in New York and was then shipped to Australia in 1920s. The restored carousel was opened in its new pavilion on 14 October 2000.
- The Sheraton Four Points is a 4½ star hotel with water views developed in the early 2000s.
- The Royal Geelong Yacht Club was established in 1859, and is located on the shores of the bay. The adjacent Bay City Marina opened on 7 November 1987
- Eastern Beach is a popular swimming and recreation area close to the centre of Geelong.

== See also ==
- Eastern Beach (Victoria)
- Port of Geelong

== Gallery ==
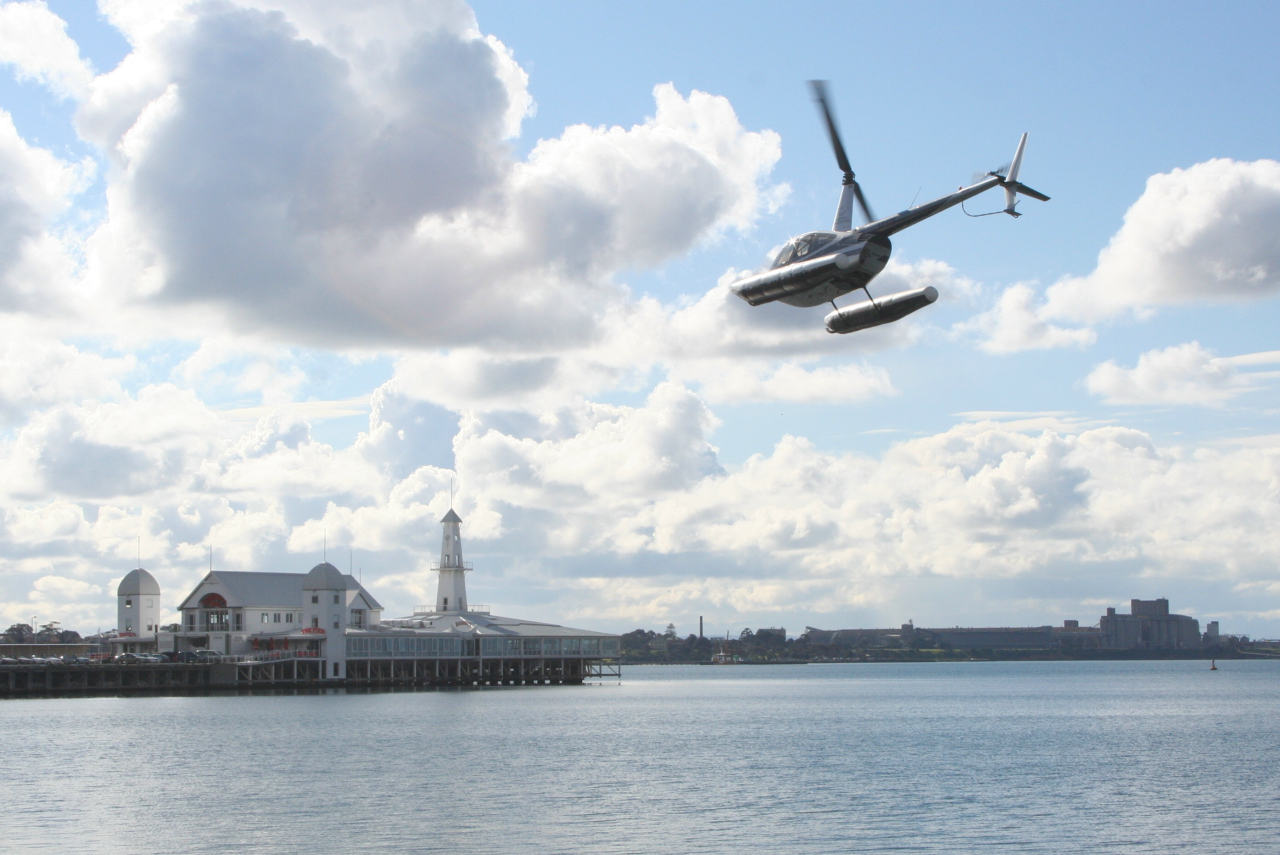
Helicopter taking off in front of Cunningham Pier

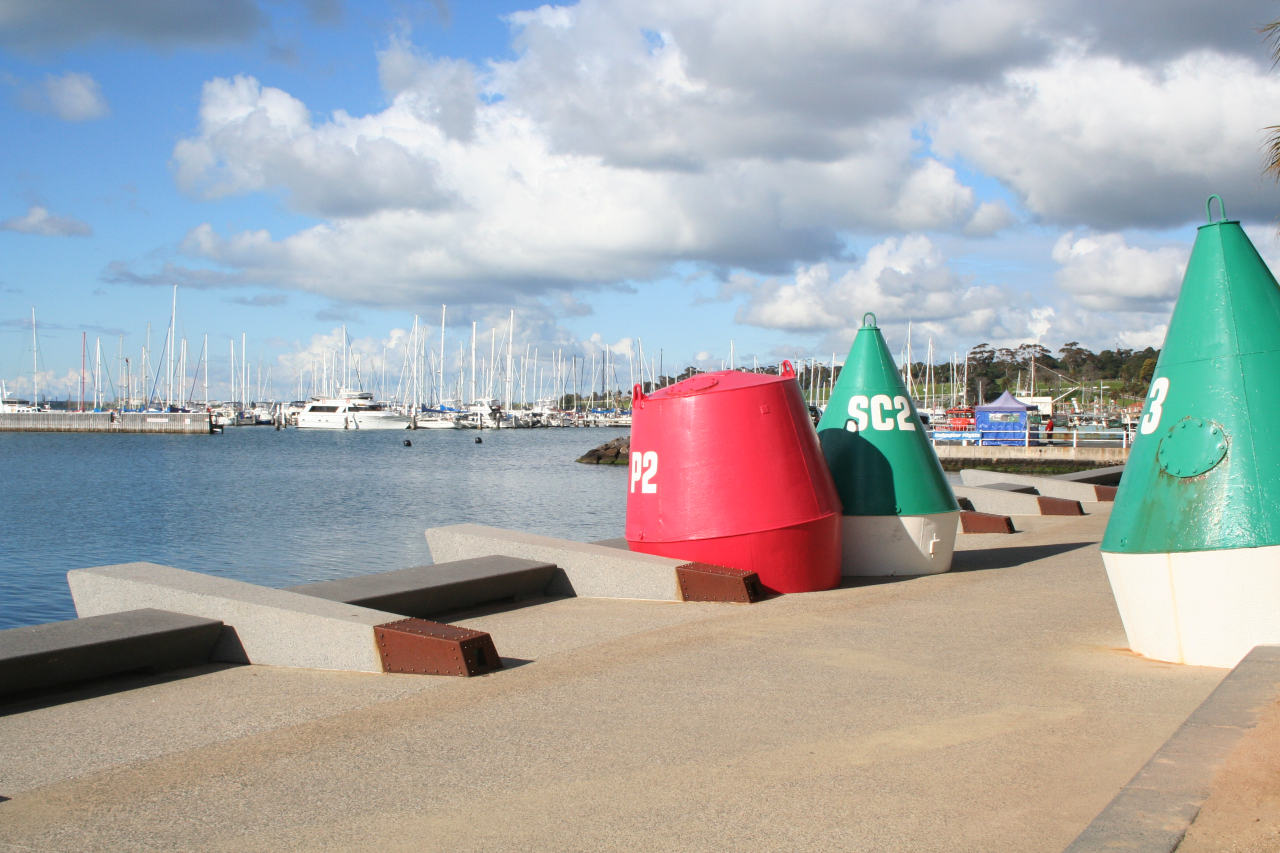
Former channel buoys

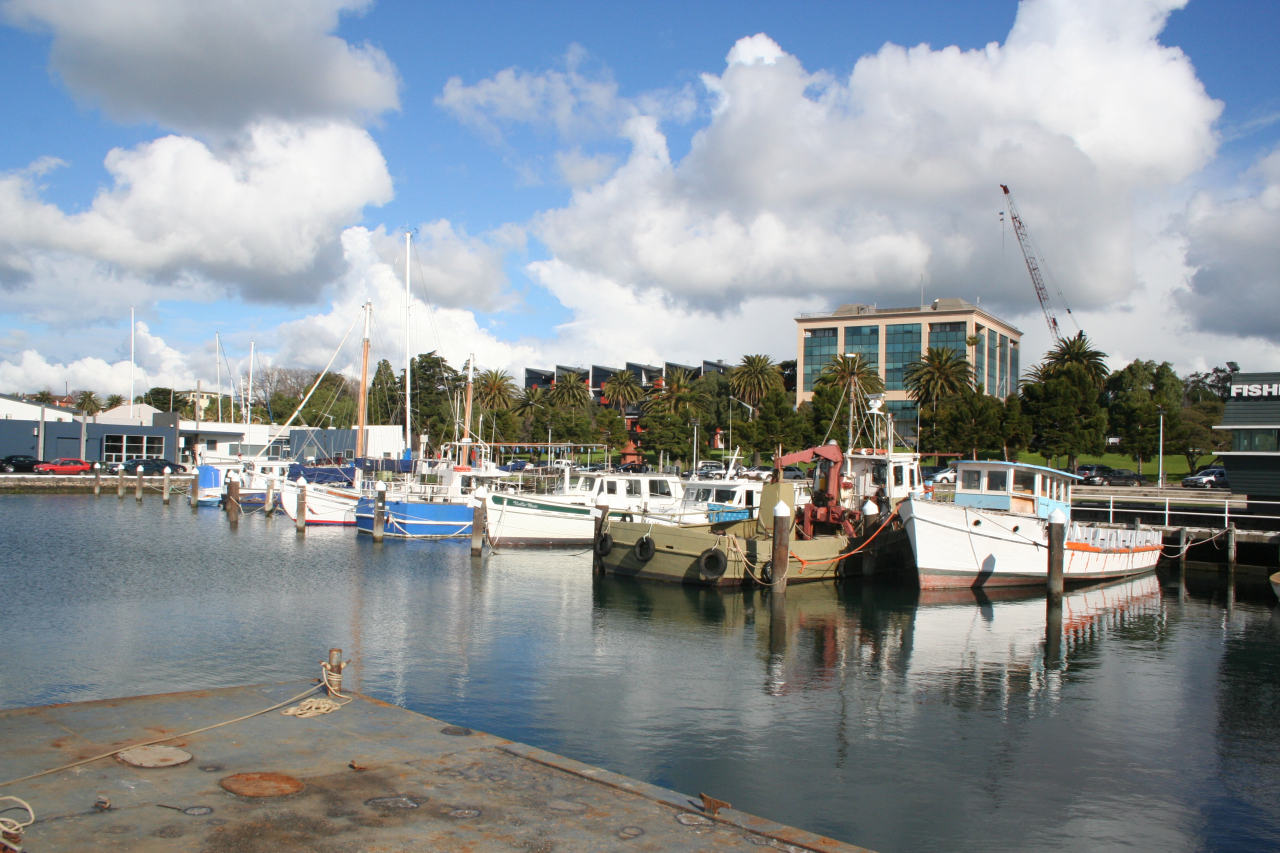
Fishing boats docked in the harbour

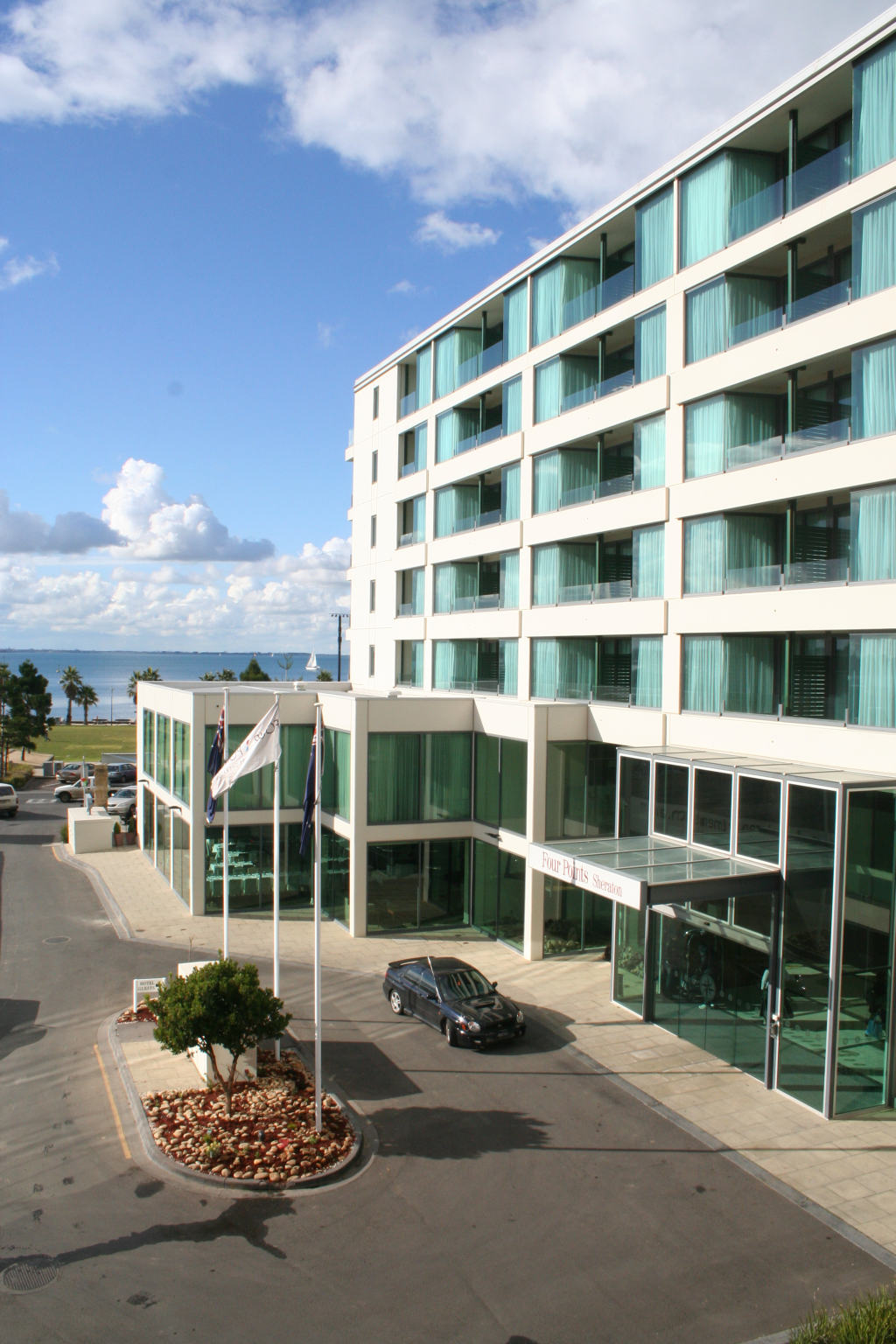
Four Points Sheraton Hotel

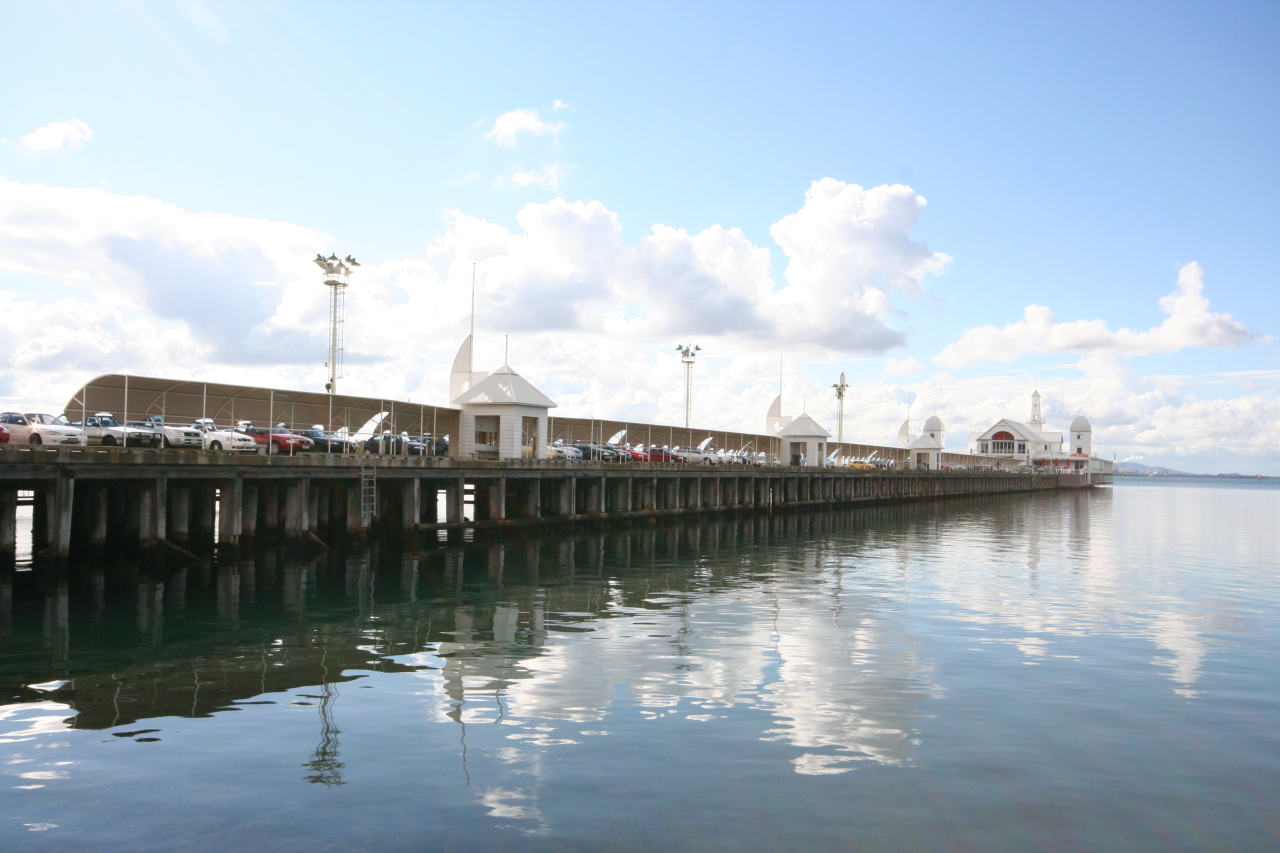
Cunningham Pier

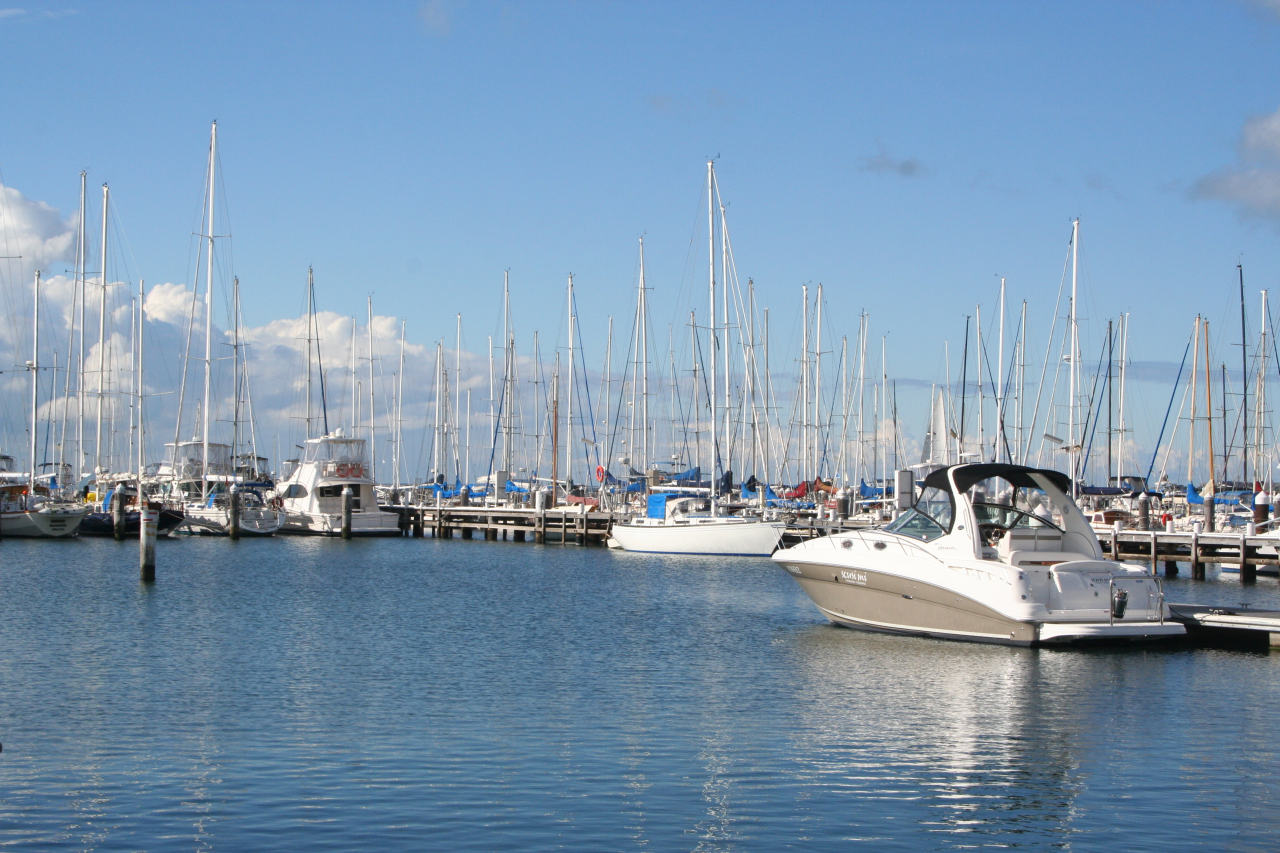
Boats docked in the Bay City Marina

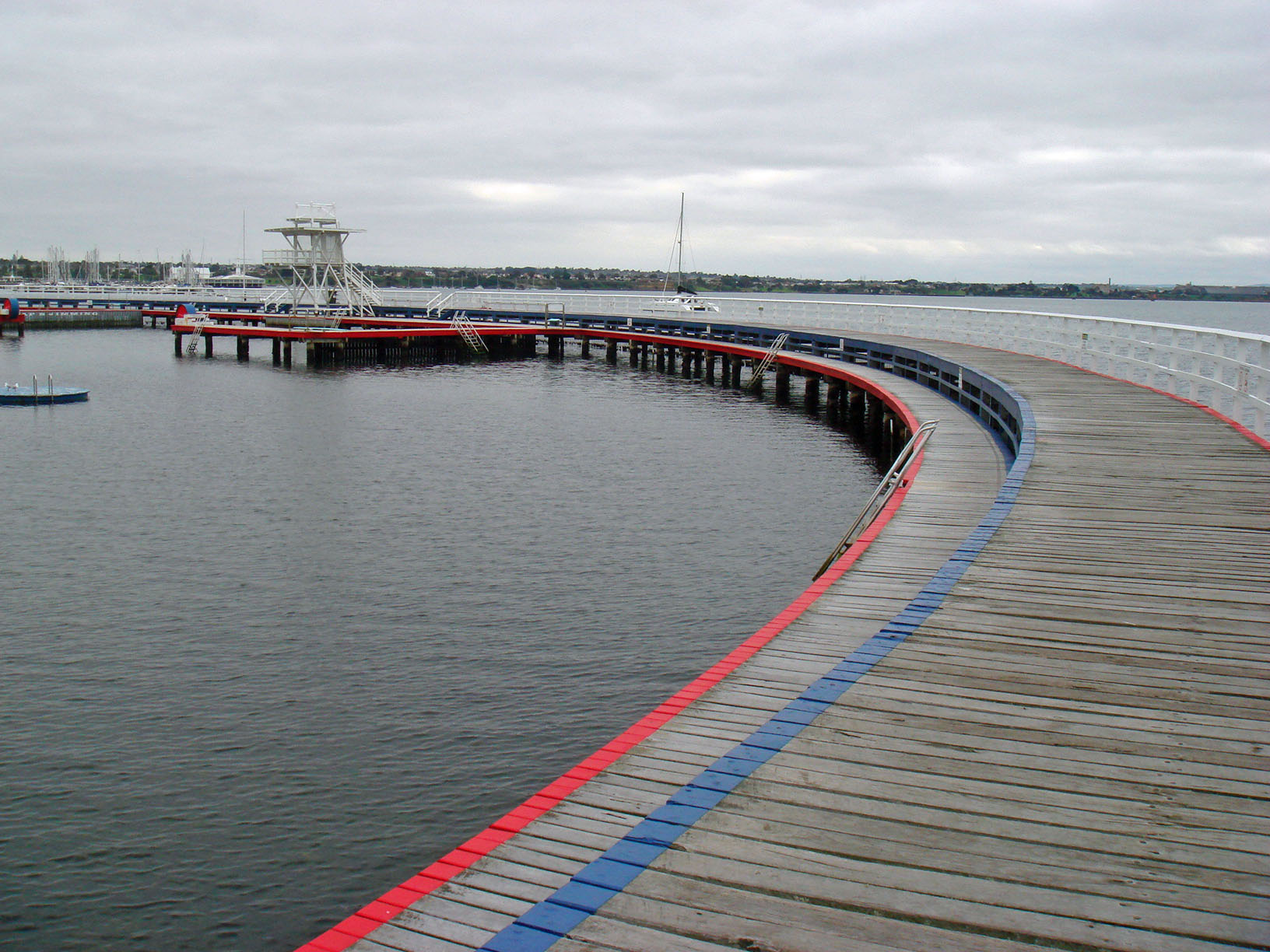
Eastern Beach boardwalk

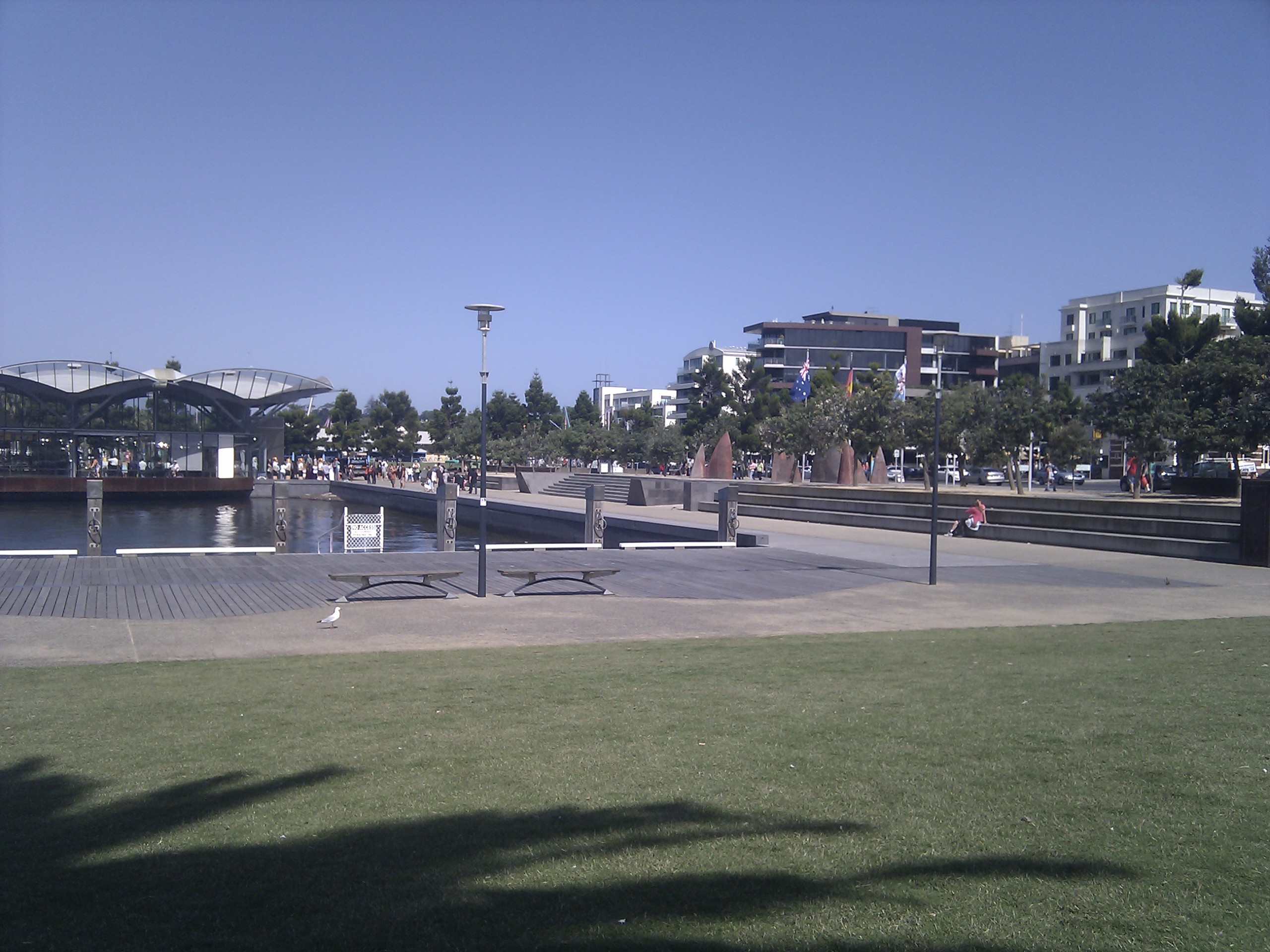
Geelong Waterfront

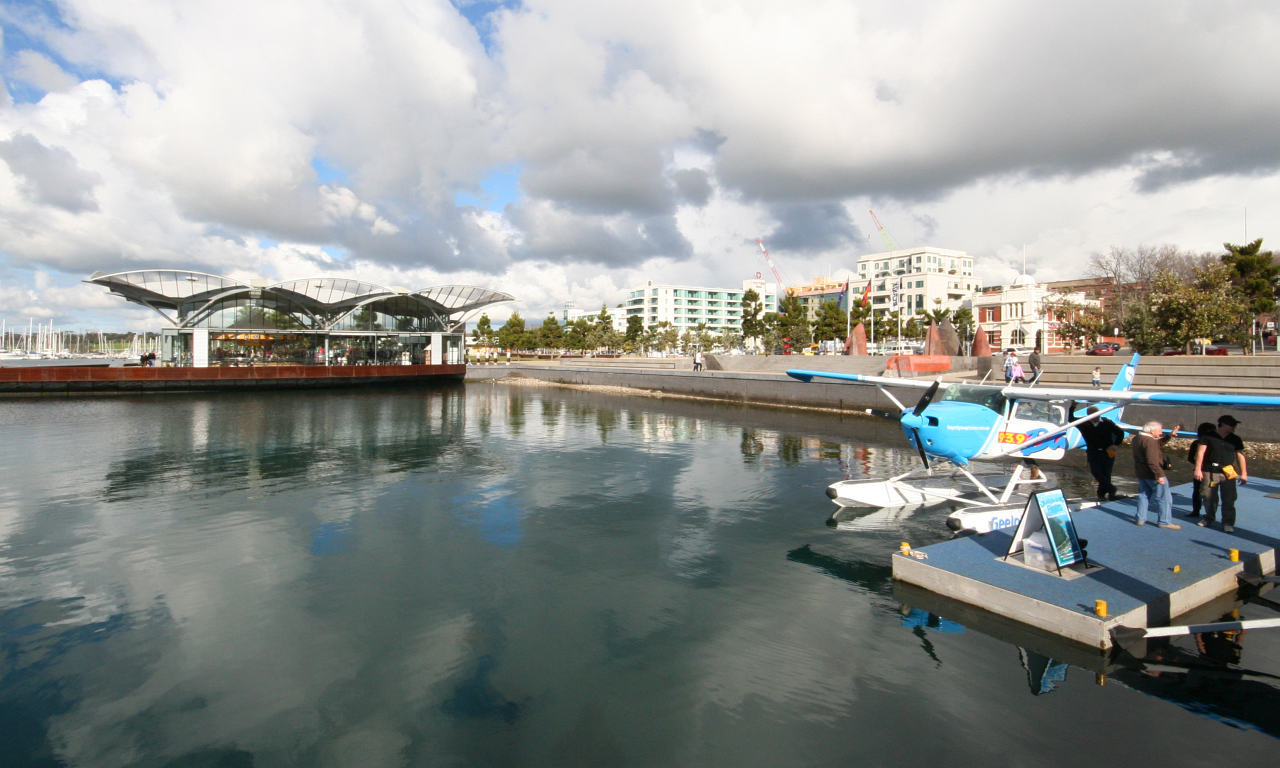
Steampacket Quay on the Geelong waterfront

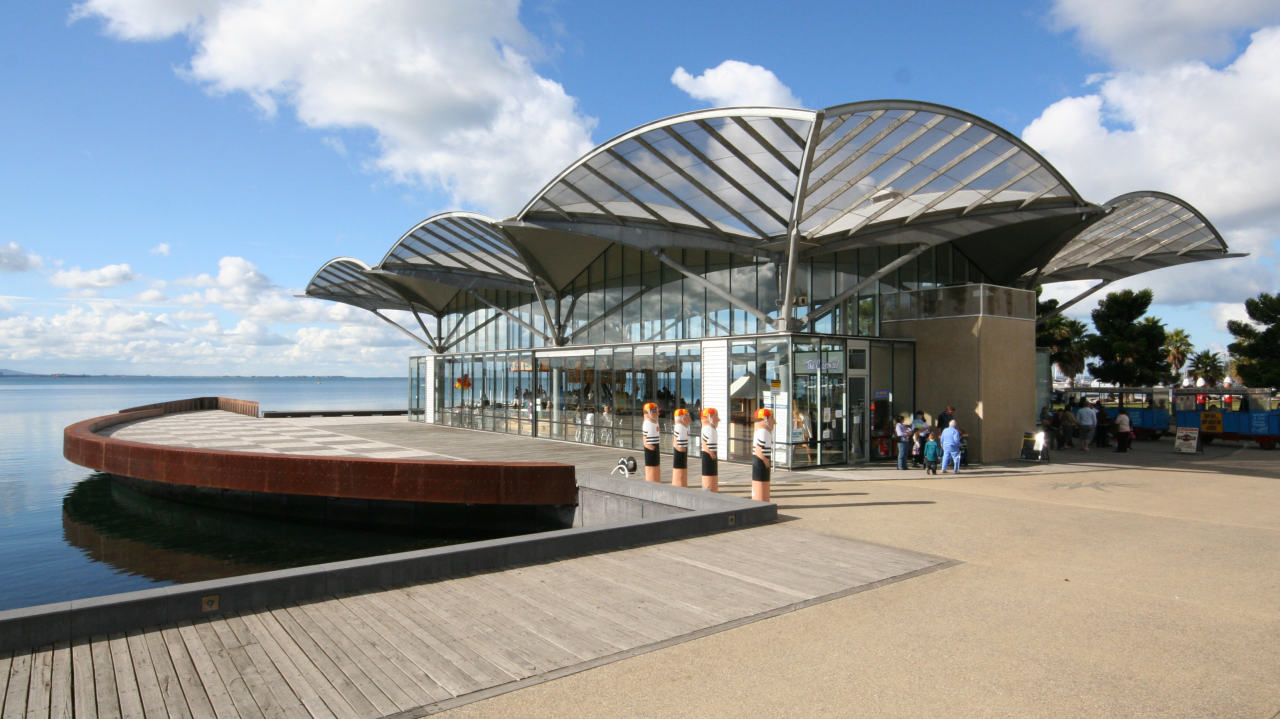
Carousel Pavilion
