= Magic Mountain, Glenelg =

Former theme park in Adelaide, South Australia

Magic Mountain
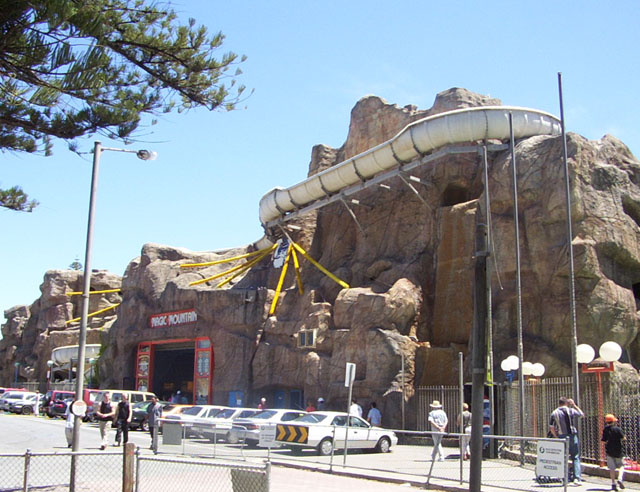
- Magic Mountain, iconic waterfall on the right (below cave) temporarily dry
- Interactive map of Magic Mountain
- Location: Colley Reserve, Glenelg, South Australia, Australia
- Coordinates: 34.9792°S 138.511°E
- Status: Defunct
- Opened: December 1982
- Closed: 18 July 2004
- Owner: City of Holdfast Bay
- Operating season: Year-round
- Area: 5,000 m^{2} (54,000 sq ft)

Attractions
- Water rides: 4

Magic Mountain was a theme park in Glenelg, a beachside suburb of Adelaide, South Australia. It opened in December 1982 and closed on 18 July 2004.

Magic Mountain was popular among the young and "young at heart", but had also been criticised for its design, which was likened to a "giant dog dropping". It was demolished amid controversy late in 2004 as part of the final stage of the Holdfast Shores development and replaced by The Beachouse in 2006.

== Operation ==
Magic Mountain was popular more with locals than tourists, and especially with younger people.

The main attraction of Magic Mountain was its four water slides, particularly during the hot Adelaide summers. (These were accessible on Level 2 of the facility. They were also the largest water slide setup in the southern hemisphere at the time.)

== Currency ==
To reduce the risk of stolen money from customers (many children), Magic Mountain took a page from Disney's book and made their own tokens for all of the attractions in the buildings. No matter which machine, One Token equalled One Game.

(Dazzeland and Downtown also made their own tokens.)

Each token was similar to Australian $1 coins, one side showing the Magic Mountain logo, surrounded by both "NO CASH VALUE" above and the year of use below. The other side either had a sponsor's logo (e.g.: Coca-Cola) or "NO CASH VALUE" in big font around a logo shaped like South Australia labelled "SA".

Matching Magic Mountain tokens from 2002, with paid advertising

Matching Magic Mountain tokens from 2002, without paid advertising

== Attractions ==
GROUND FLOOR:

- Pinball machines (20+/- approx.)

Titles included:

- Star Trek: The Next Generation
- The Addams Family (pinball)
- Doctor Who (pinball)
- The Twilight Zone (pinball)
- Back to the Future: The Pinball (pinball)
- Arcade Machines (35+/- approx.)

Titles included:

- Teenage Mutant Ninja Turtles
- The Simpsons
- Fatal Fury
- Final Fight
- Golden Axe
- OutRun
- Rampage
- Air Hockey (3+/- approx.)
- A Carousel (1 - which has now been preserved)
- Mini-Golf Course (1)

LEVEL 1:

- A Light-Rifle Wild West themed Shooting Gallery (1):

A red sanded Old West desert plain area, red and white bullseye targets everywhere, one for each interactive target, doing comical actions when shot. For example, The Piano Player would jerk around then play a short tune on his piano. The Can - attached by a strong antenna-like wire to the ground - would fly up then back down again.

Targets included:

- The Piano Player
- The Snake
- The Tin Can
- The Bottle
- Bumper Boats (1)
- Dodgem Cars (1)
- Sky Cycles (1)

LEVEL 2:

- Water Slides (4)

== Closure and demolition ==
Demolition of Magic Mountain was part of the second stage of the Holdfast Shores development, and was required in order to maintain the stipulated amount of open space. The plan, signed in 1997, included a profit-sharing agreement between the state government and the Holdfast Shores consortium, and a separate agreement concerning public infrastructure with the local government (the City of Holdfast Bay).

Stage 1 saw the construction of the marina, the Marina Pier and two apartment blocks. The second stage was construction of the Pier Hotel. Agreements changed before Stage 2 began. The state government withdrew from the now-considered risky hotel development and sold the land to the consortium. The plan also changed, with the separation of the hotel from the Platinum Apartments – the new plan became known as Stage 2B.

Meanwhile, a public-opinion survey in the lead-up to the May 2003 local government elections caused the council to rethink its support of the new plan. Their new-found opposition to the proposed beachfront high-rise apartments focused on Magic Mountain as the one parcel of land within the project that was under their control.

The council's campaign was ultimately unsuccessful and the development received Government approval in early 2004. Magic Mountain closed for the last time on 18 July 2004 and was demolished soon after. The new development included construction of The Beachouse, replacing Magic Mountain, which opened on 1 July 2006.

== The Beachouse ==
The Beachouse family entertainment complex replaced Magic Mountain, located on the foreshore in Glenelg in Adelaide, South Australia. The five-story complex includes attractions such as waterslides, dodgem cars, bumper boats, mini golf, playcastle, train and arcade games. The historic carousel also stands at The Beachouse complex, having been fully restored and now a popular photo destination. The Beachouse also features a function room located on level 3, The Function at the Beachouse, which is hired for various events including weddings, birthdays, social events, corporate events and conferences.
