= G-class Sydney tram =

G-class
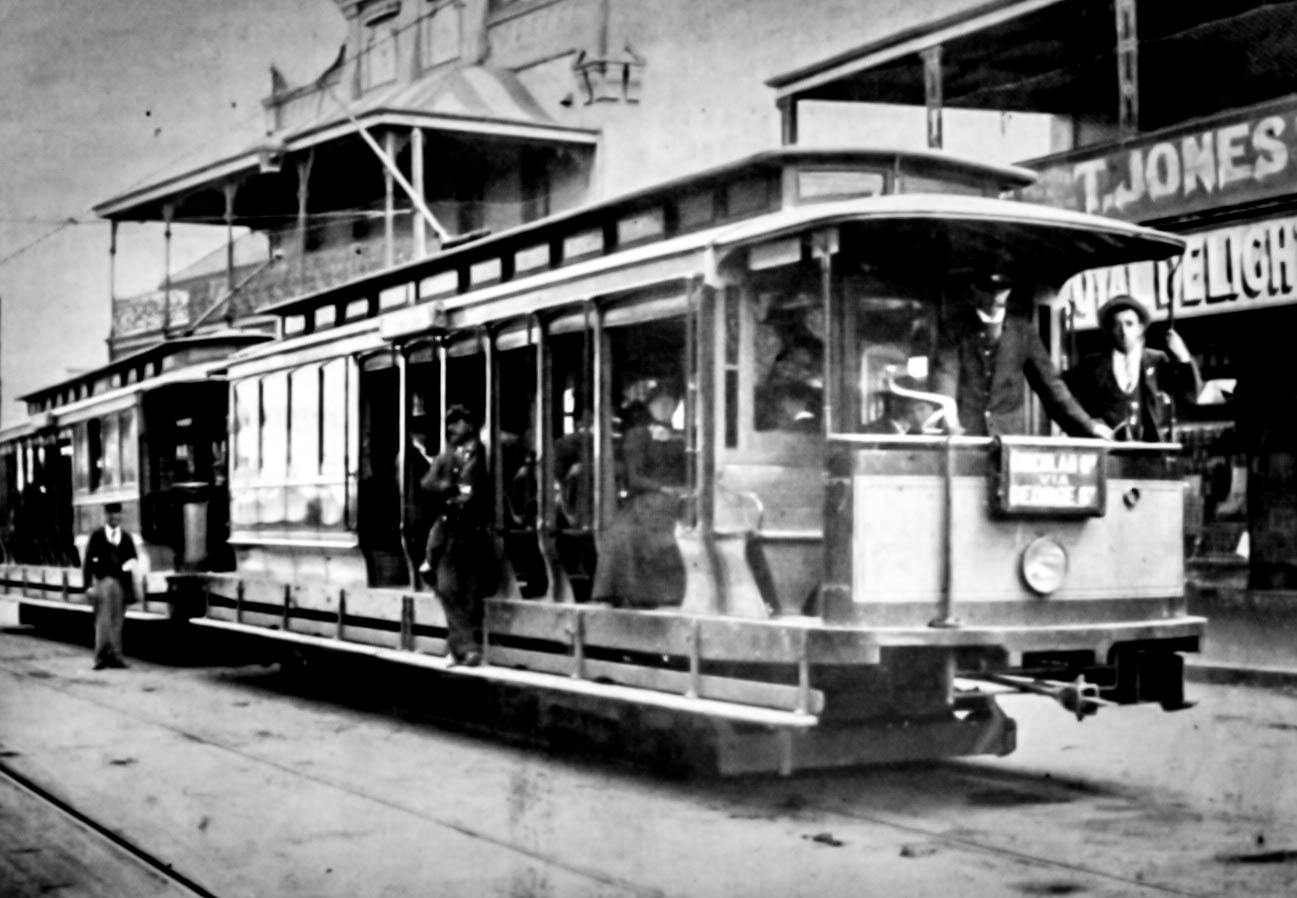
- G128 & G129
- Manufacturer: American Car Company; J. G. Brill Company
- Constructed: 1899
- Number built: 16
- Fleet numbers: 124-139
- Capacity: 51 (later 49) (Seated)

Specifications
- Train length: 23 ft 3 in (7.09 m)
- Height: 12 ft 1.5 in (3.70 m)
- Maximum speed: 60 km/h
- Weight: 12.6 long tons (12.8 t)
- Power output: 4 x 42 hp (later 48)
- Electric system(s): 600 V DC catenary
- Current collector(s): Pantograph
- Track gauge: 1,435 mm (4 ft 8 1/2 in)

The Sydney G-class Trams were a class of single ended cars were designed to operate either permanently coupled back to back in pairs or singly hauling a trailer on lines with reversing arrangements at the terminuses.

== History ==
The G Class Trams were imported from the United States for the electrification of George Street. They were originally allocated to Ultimo Tram Depot, later moving to Newtown and Tempe. All were withdrawn by 1927.

As they only had driving controls at one end, they operated in pairs. Two (124 and 125) were fitted with dual controls to operate tourist services in 1905.

== Numbers ==
- American Car Company: 124-131
- J. G. Brill Company: 132-139
