= Eastern Beach (Victoria) =

Beach and heritage-listed bathing complex in Geelong, Victoria, Australia

- Beach
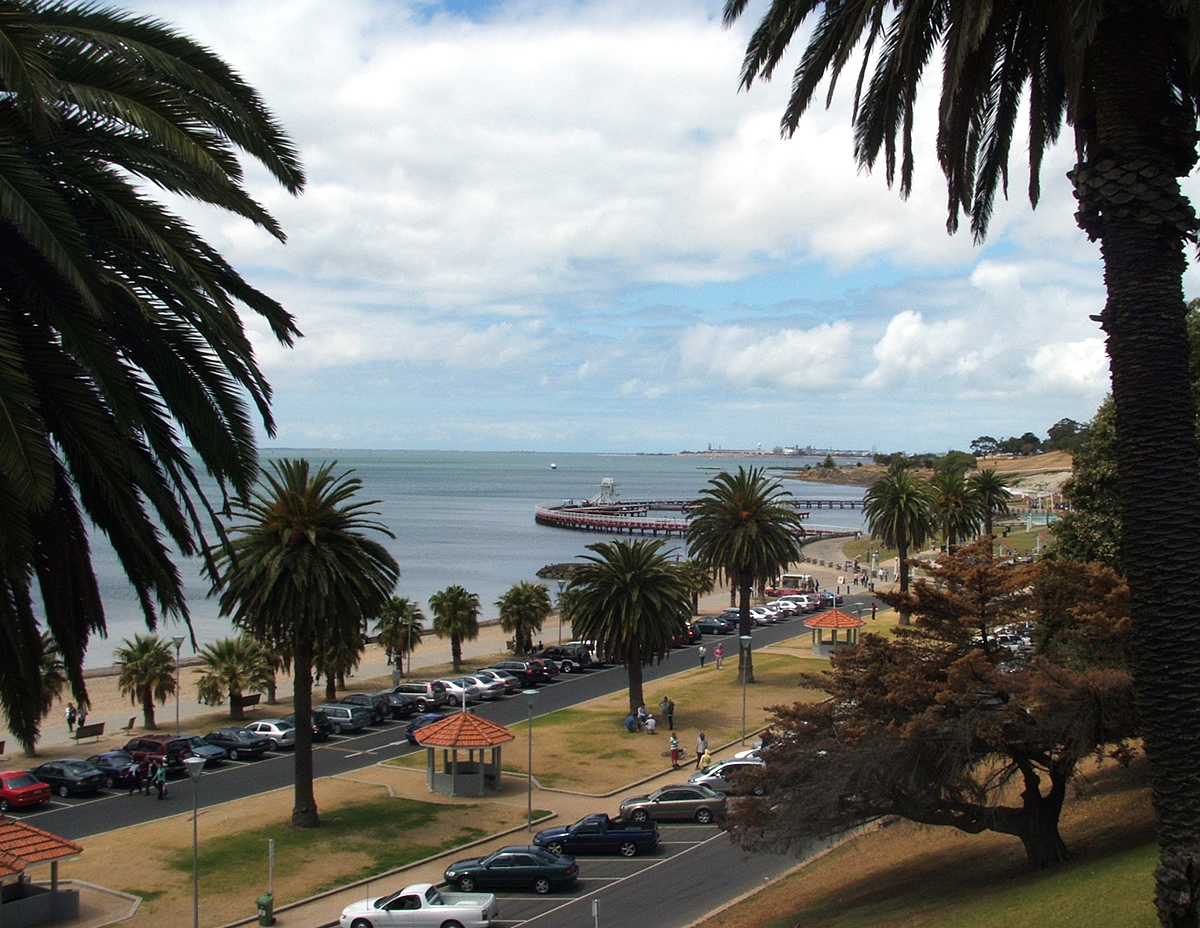
- Eastern Beach
- Interactive map of Eastern Beach
- Coordinates: 38°08′51″S 144°22′25″E
- Location: Geelong, Victoria, Australia
- Water bodies: Corio Bay

Dimensions
  - Length: 0.7 kilometres (0.43 mi)
- Patrolled by: SLSA
- Hazard rating: 1/10 (least hazardous)
- Access: Eastern Beach Road, Ritchie Boulevard

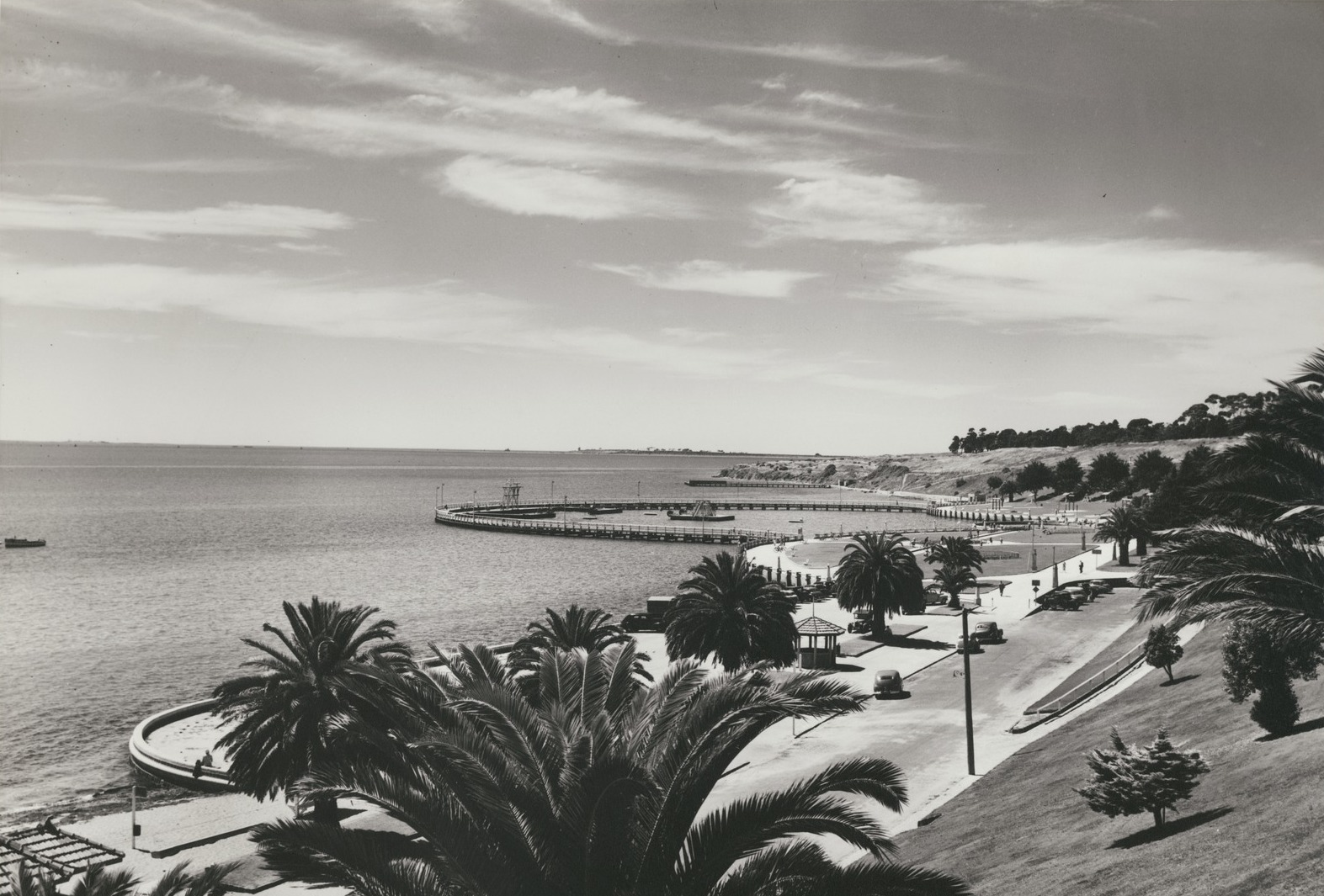
Eastern Beach in 1950

Eastern Beach is a popular swimming and recreation area in Geelong, Victoria, Australia, on the shores of Corio Bay. Built during the 1930s in the Art Deco style, a shark-proof sea bath is provided, as well as a children's swimming pool, kiosk, and dressing room pavilion. A number of Art Deco buildings in the area are listed on the Victorian Heritage Register.

== History ==
=== Beginnings ===
Since as early as 1844, Eastern Beach has been used for sea bathing. Separate sea bathing areas for men and women were erected. By 1872 there were 6 bathing areas along the beach. Around this period the beach was considered unpleasant and dangerous by some, with steep cliffs running from the northern town boundary to the shores of Corio Bay.

Redevelopment plans were first proposed in 1914 by the City of Geelong. Work was to include a 1-mile (1.6 km) sea wall from Yarra Street to Limeburners Point, land reclamation, and the flattening of the cliffs along the beach. Further plans were drawn up for a chalet at the beach, which later appeared in the form of the kiosk building.

Work began in September 1927 when contracts were let for construction of the concrete stairway, terraces and dressing sheds. J.C. Taylor and Sons were the successful contractor. That stage of the works was opened on 20 December 1929, by the Mayor of Geelong, Cr Solomon Jacobs.

The semi-circular shark-proof swimming enclosure and children's pool were opened by Cr Jacobs on 28 March 1939. The enclosure covered 8 1/2 acres (3.4 ha) and could accommodate 10,000 bathers. The precinct development cost £40,000 ($80,000), but was seen by the council of the time as being an investment in the city.

To cater to beach goers, a tramway extension along Corio Terrace (later Brougham Street) as far as Bellerine Street opened in October 1940. The line was closed in 1956 along with the rest of Geelong's tramways.

=== Later years ===
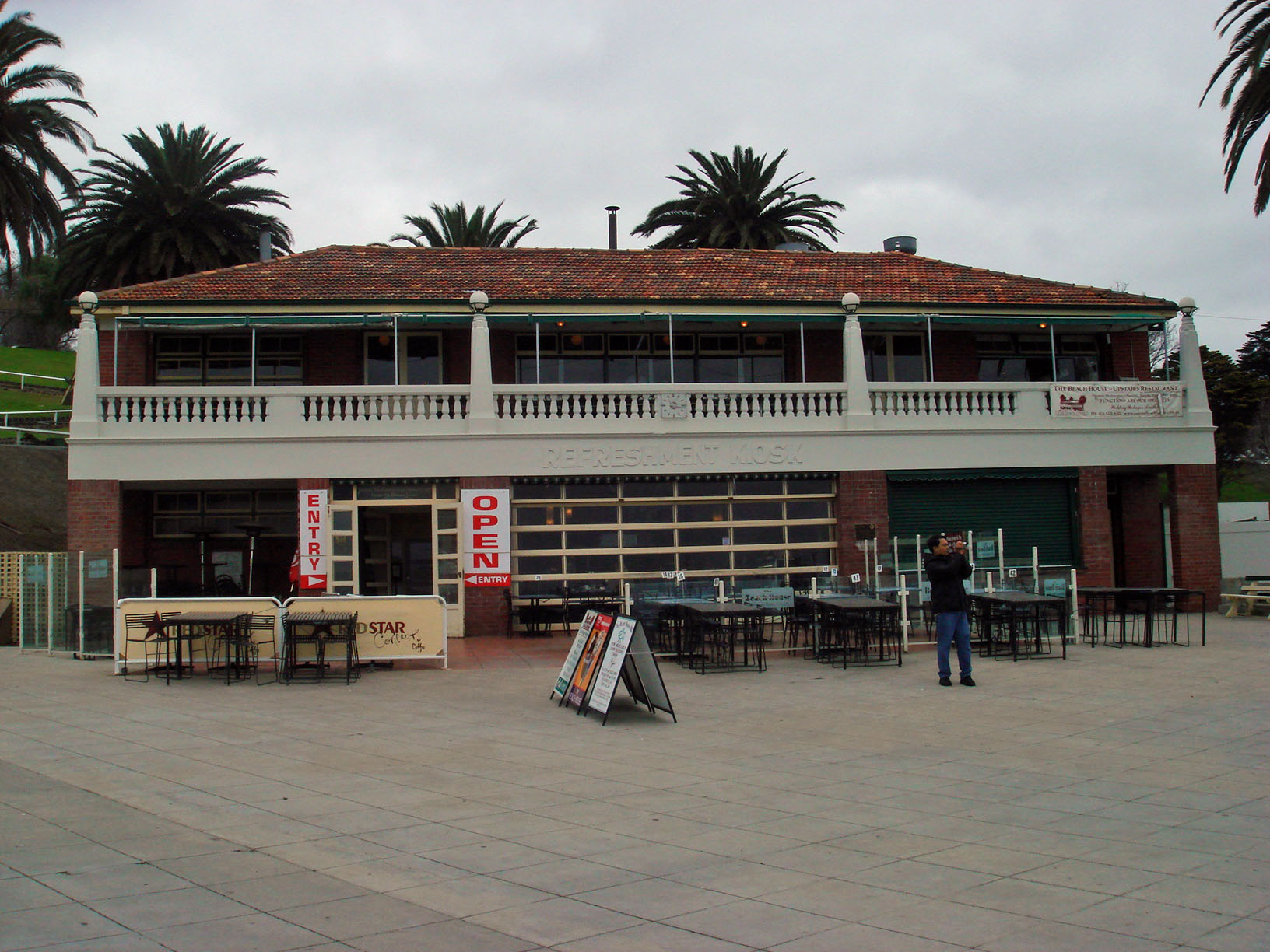
Kiosk building

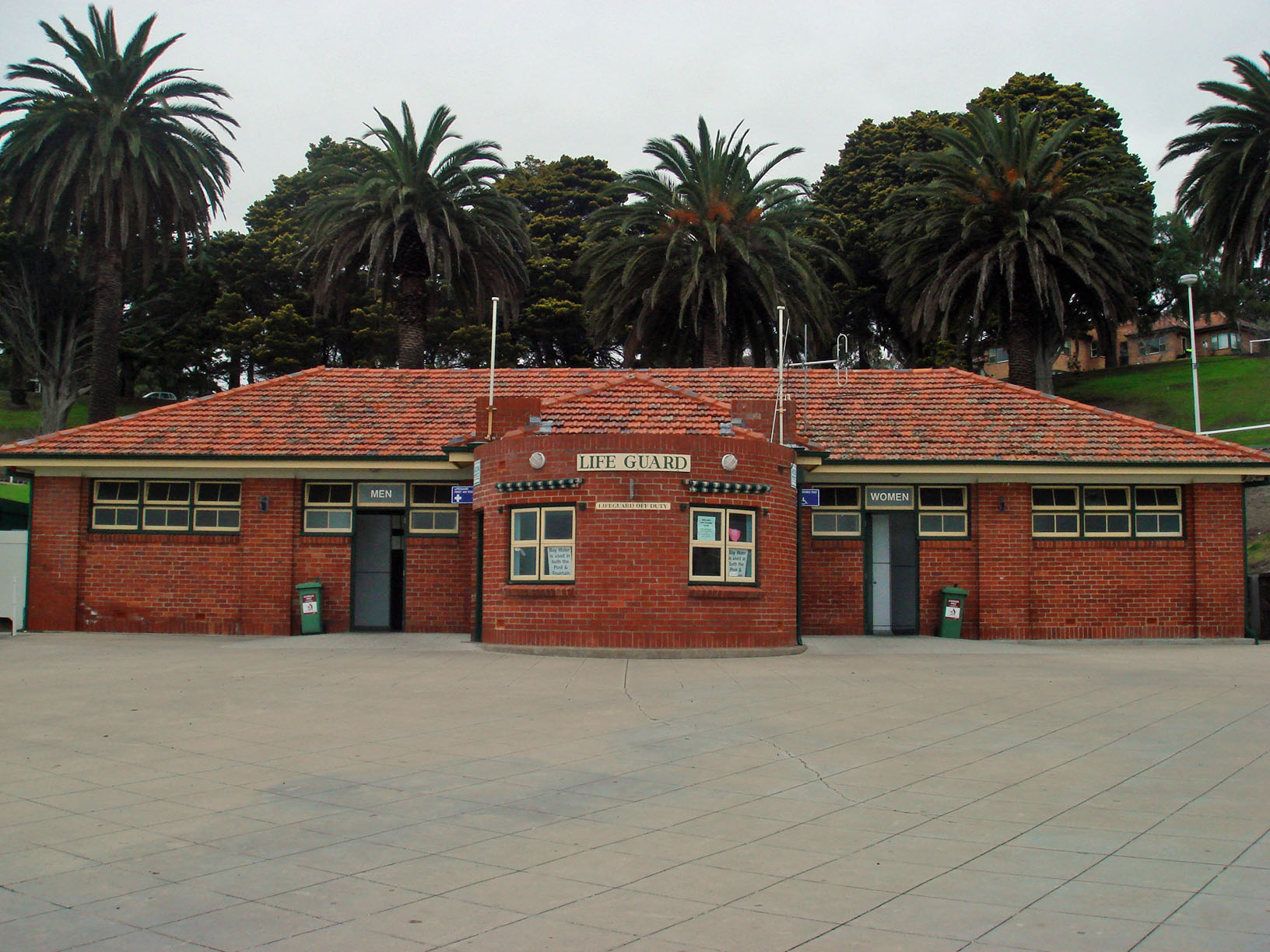
Lifesavers pavilion and change rooms

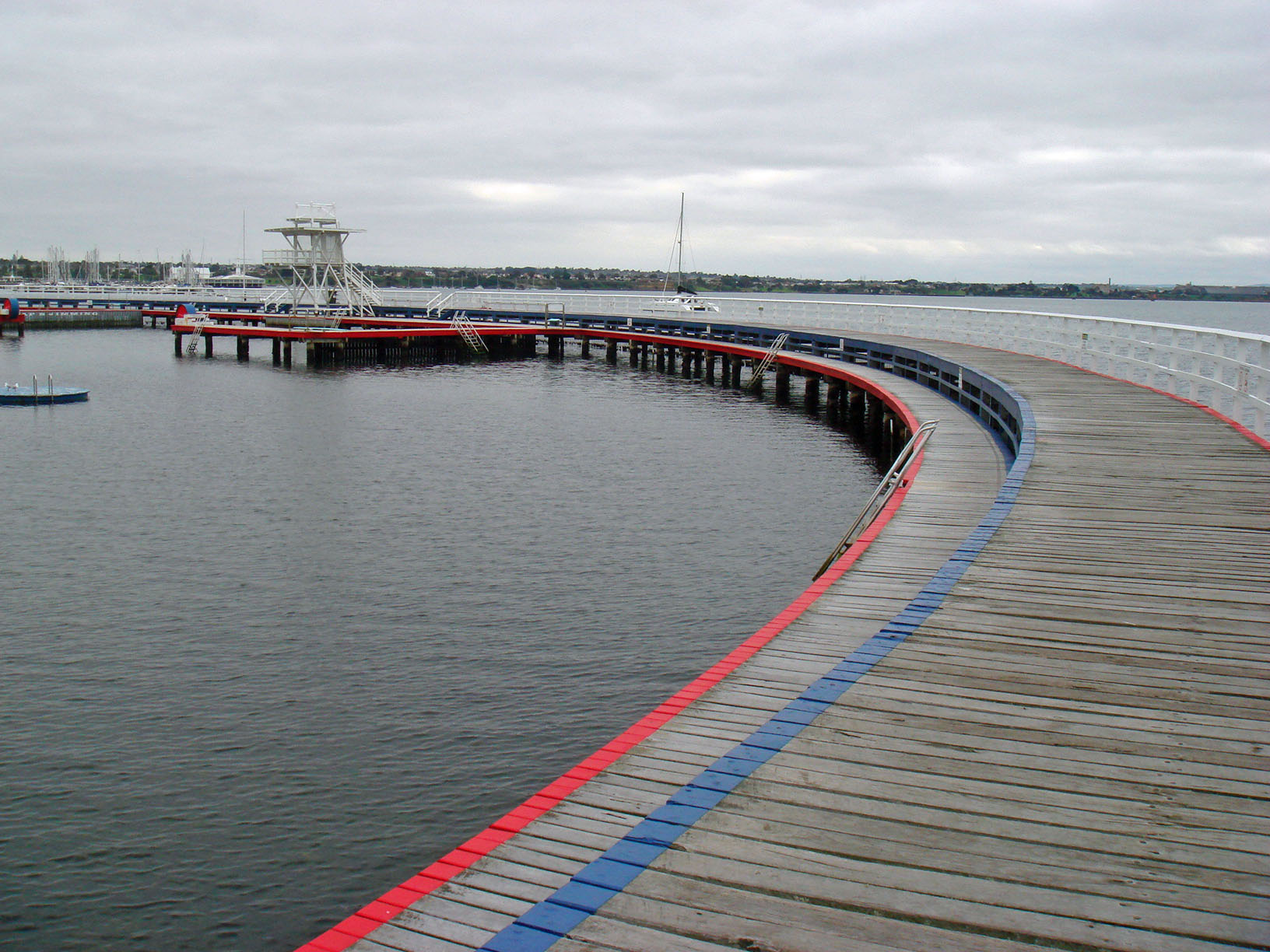
Boardwalk and swimming enclosure

The area began a slow decline from the 1960s, with its popularity diminishing as a result of increased motor car ownership, which gave Geelong residents easier access to ocean beaches. Later decades of neglect saw the area fall into disrepair.

The decline was arrested in 1993, when the City of Greater Geelong announced plans for the restoration of the area. Partial funding of the works came from people being given the opportunity to purchase a plank on the boardwalk around he swimming enclosure. The boardwalk and enclosure were rebuilt, and the children's swimming pool, kiosk and change rooms were renovated. The Beach House restaurant was also opened on the upper level of the kiosk building.

The late 1990s saw the original diving tower reinstated at the bay side of the swimming enclosure, after an absence of many years. However, the rebuilt structure was altered from the original design, with access to the topmost level being barred due to injury concerns.

The improvements were the first stage of the Geelong Waterfront developments along the Corio Bay foreshore.

Eastern Beach is the venue of festivals and concerts, as well as the annual Geelong Carols by the Bay concert hosted by Denis Walter.
