= The Beachouse =

Amusement park in Adelaide, Australia

- Interactive map of The Beachouse
- Location: Glenelg, Adelaide, South Australia
- Coordinates: 34.9793°S 138.5114°E
- Opened: 1 June 2006
- Slogan: It's more fun at our house!
- Operating season: All Year Round (Open Every Day)
- Website: www.thebeachouse.com.au

The Beachouse is a family entertainment complex located on the foreshore at Glenelg in Adelaide, South Australia. The five-story complex also features a function room, The Function, Glenelg. The Beachouse replaced the old arcade/entertainment venue, Magic Mountain which stood from 1982 to 2004.

== Attractions ==
The Beachouse has the following attractions:

- The Slides, three enclosed and heated slides - Dual Slide, Speed Slide and Raft Slide (which accommodates rafts) - up to 130 metres.
- The Cars, Soli Italian Formula One Dodgem Cars, the Rolls-Royce of Dodgem Cars, built in Bologna, Italy.
- The Castle, a 7-storey Playcastle.
- The Carousel, a historic 120-year-old carousel, previously at Magic Mountain, that has been fully restored.
- The Golf, a western-themed, 18-hole mini-golf course.
- The Boats, Bumper Boats equipped with water cannons.
- The Train, a miniature train that circumnavigates the mini golf course.
- The Games, including arcade, prize and ticket games.
- Cafe, including hot and cold meals and snacks, cold drinks and coffee.

== The Function, Glenelg ==
The Function is located on Level 3 of The Beachouse complex. Features include a private cocktail bar, state-of-the-art multimedia facilities and an open balcony that looks over Glenelg Beach. The Function can host up to 200 guests and is available for hire every day of the year. It is popular for weddings, birthdays and social events and is also suitable for corporate events, conferences and seminars. The Function offers a team building experience for corporate and sporting groups that encompasses the use of The Beachouse's attractions.

== The Big Wedgie ==
In December 2015, The Beachouse achieved the Guinness World Record for the world's tallest inflatable waterslide. The Big Wedgie stands at 18.2 meters tall and 82 meters long, with a 55 degree drop. The Big Wedgie events consist of up to 5 waterslides: The Big Wedgie, The Just Right Wedgie, The Little Wedgie, The Big Chucka and The Little Skidda.

As of 2019, The Big Wedgie is hosted at BIG4 West Beach Parks (formerly BIG4 Adelaide Shores), located in West Beach, South Australia, as well as on the Gold Coast, Queensland, and was formerly also located in Perth, Western Australia.
