= Adventure Park, Geelong =

Amusement and water park in Wallington, Victoria, Australia

Adventure Park
- Interactive map of Adventure Park
- Location: 1251 Bellarine Hwy, Wallington, Victoria, Australia
- Coordinates: 38.209188°S 144.515212°E
- Opened: 24 October 1994
- Owner: Salmon Family
- Slogan: Victoria's Biggest Water Theme Park
- Operating season: November through March
- Area: 183 acres (74 ha)

Attractions
- Total: 23
- Roller coasters: 1
- Water rides: 12
- Website: www.adventurepark.com.au

Adventure Park is a water-theme park in Wallington, Victoria. The first and largest water park in its home state, it features attractions such as water slides, water playgrounds, action rides and family rides. Originally exclusively a water park, the park also features a number of dry amusement park rides, such as an SBF Visa Spinning Coaster, Ferris wheel, and a number of children's rides.

== Attractions ==
=== Current Attractions ===
Name	Section	Type	Opened
Aqua Racer	Water Rides	Water Slide	27 September 2007
Bonitos Bay Water Play	Water Rides	Water Playground	12 January 2008
Ferris Wheel	Family Rides	Ferris Wheel	7 November 2015
Fortress Falls Mini Golf	Family Rides	18 hole Mini Golf	24 October 1994
Grand Carousel	Kids Rides	Merry-Go-Round	20 September 1998
Gold Rush Rapids	Water Rides	Tandem Tube Water Slide	5 November 2011
Little Buggy Speedway	Kids Rides	Electric Cars	23 September 2006
Red Baron	Kids Rides	Electric Plane	29 October 2016
Lazy River	Water Rides	Lazy River	4 October 2008
Shipwreck Harbour	Family Rides	Paddle Boats	16 October 1995
Skeleton Creek Mini Golf	Family Rides	18 Hole Mini Golf	24 October 1994
Tornado	Water Rides	Water Raft	11 November 2017
Tsunami	Water Rides	Water Raft	November 2019
Tiny Tots Splashzone	Water Rides	Water Playground	4 October 2008
Crazy Coaster	Family Rides	Spinning roller coaster	29 October 2016
Wave Swinger	Family Rides	Swing Carousel	11 December 2012
Wild West Canyon	Water Rides	Tandem Tube Water Slide	5 November 2011
Thunder Falls	Water Rides	Free fall drop Water Slides	22 November 2025
Drop Zone	Family Rides	Free Falling Tower Ride	20 June 2026

=== Former Attractions ===
Name	Section	Type	Opened	Closed
Rapid Rider	Water Rides	Tandem Tube Water Slide	16 October 1995	30 April 2011
The Tunnel Of Terror	Water Rides	Tandem Tube Water Slide	16 October 1995	30 April 2011
Archery	Family Attractions	Individual		12 April 2019
Go Karts	Family Attractions	Kart Ride		22 April 2016
