= Geelong Library and Heritage Centre =

Local history centre in Victoria, Australia

Coordinates: 38.145408°S 144.361253°E

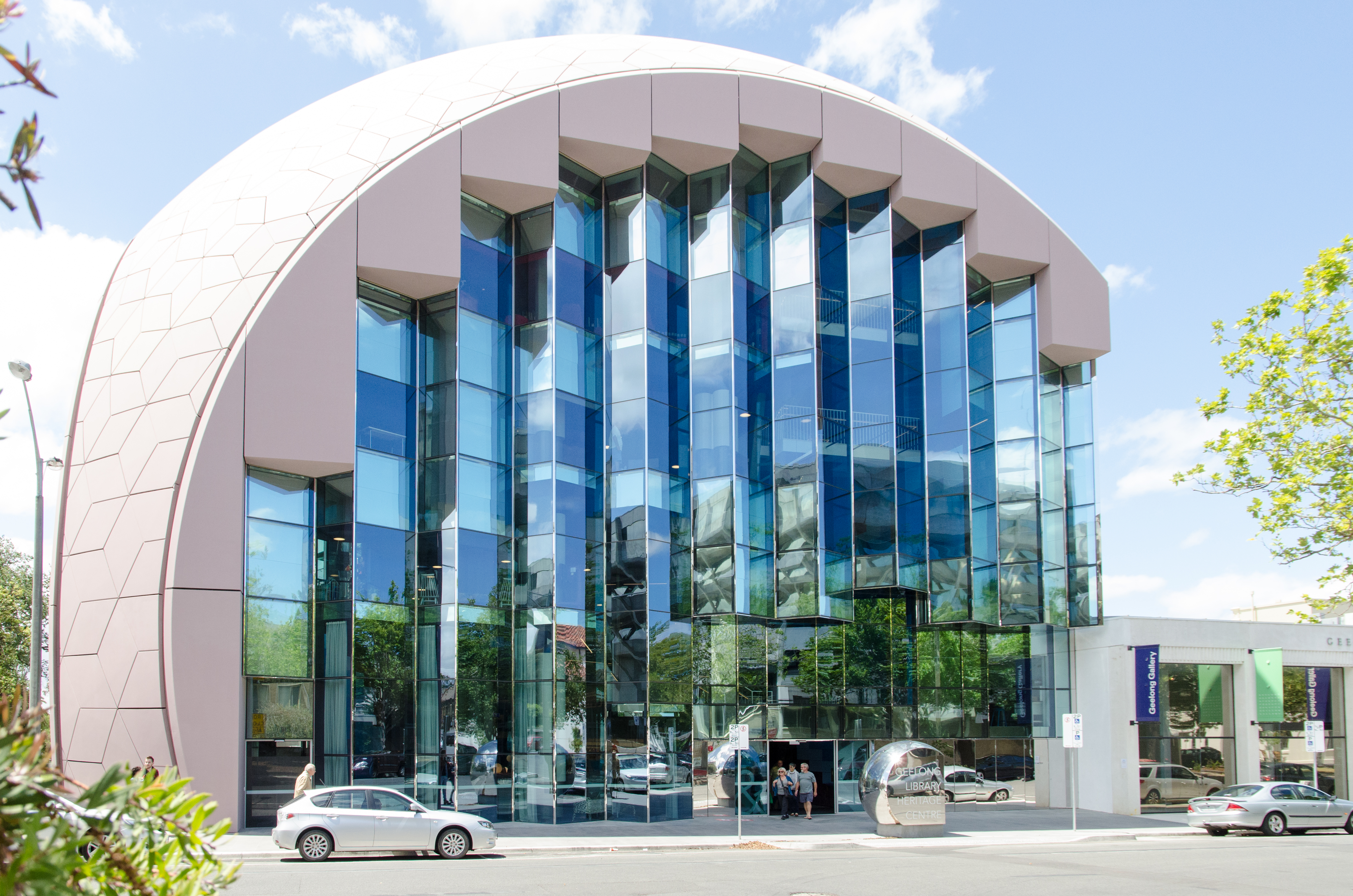
- Formation: 1858 (library), 1979 (heritage centre)
- Headquarters: Little Malop St., Geelong
- Location: Geelong, Victoria, Australia

The Geelong Library and Heritage Centre is a regional library, archive and resource facility in the city of Geelong, Victoria, Australia. Geelong Free Library was begun in 1858. The Geelong Historical Records Centre was established in 1979 as a depository for significant historical records and archives from the district. The centre is a Place of Deposit, as part of the Public Record Office Victoria network of community archives designated for the preservation of Victoria's history. It is described as ...the largest regional archive in Victoria.

== Geelong Regional Library ==
The Geelong Library began in 1858 as part of the Mechanics Institute. It expanded in 1876, when it relocated to a large neoclassical building in Moorabool Street, formerly owned by the Geelong Chamber of commerce. The library moved to a new building in Johnstone Park, designed by Buchan, Laird & Buchan, which opened in 1962.

== Geelong Historical Records Centre ==
Previously known as the Geelong Historical Records Centre, its name was changed to the Geelong Heritage Centre in 2003. The Geelong Heritage Centre holds archival and historical records gathered by the Geelong Historical Society, which has also been involved in numerous commemorative events and dedicating monuments, and is often cited as the authoritative source on early Geelong, including the commemoration of the 150th anniversary of the exploration of the area by Matthew Flinders, and his climbing of Station Peak, now Flinders Peak, in the You Yangs.

== Geelong Historical Society ==
Geelong Historical Society
- Formation: 1944
- Type: Historical Society
- Headquarters: 6 Balmoral Crescent, Rippleside
- Location: Geelong, Victoria, Australia
- President: David Brunton
- Secretary: Lana Capon
- Website: Geelong Historical Society

The Geelong Historical Society was instrumental in the establishment of the Geelong Historical Records Centre as an approved place of deposit for historic local government records, through a partnership with the Geelong local government and Public Record Office Victoria in 1979. The Geelong Historical Society traces its foundation to 1944 when the organisation was established to preserve the history of Geelong and district. However, earlier attempts were made to establish a historical society such as a proclamation in 1938. It is likely that the War delayed its formal commencement.

It was the third historical society of its type to be established in Victoria, representing the state's second city both in size and period of establishment. It is also among the most prolific in terms of size of its collection, quantity of research, and number of publications. Its role in preserving and documenting the history of Geelong was recognized in the Geelong sesquicentennial history.

A meeting aimed at establishing a historical society in Geelong was held in November 1923, when C. R. Long and J. A. Laird from the (Gordon Institute) called a meeting of prominent local citizens. The Geelong Mayor, Howard Hitchcock, proposed an exhibition at the Geelong City Hall of "relics and historical records", which was opened on 27 September 1921 by the famous anthropologist Sir Baldwin Spencer and ran until 14 October 1921. The exhibition material later became the nucleus of the Geelong Historical Society collection. In 1938 a public meeting chaired by L. Bechervaise passed a motion to form the Geelong and District Historical Society. and the sopciety was formally established in 1944. However, records held by the society dating to the early 1920s, including council minute books and financial accounts, suggest the collection function of the society may have commenced much earlier than its official formation.

A local historian, Norm Houghton, played a major role in organising the collection while its past president, the late Peter F. B. Alsop, was one of a number of members who published prolifically on local historical matters. Other prominent members include Mr William James Morrow, DFC, who was awarded an OAM for service to the Geelong Historical Society and to historical research and prolific historian and writer Peter Mansfield, winner of the Victorian History Library Short History Prize.

The society has organised presentations and excursions since the 1950s, and has previously worked in conjunction with the Geelong Heritage Centre (formerly Geelong Historical Records Section), which holds the archival and historical records gathered by the society. It has also been involved in numerous commemorative events and dedicating monuments, and is often cited as the authoritative source on early Geelong people and history., including the commemoration of the 150th anniversary of Matthew Flinders exploration of the district and climbing of Station Peak. It has also played a major role in the preservation of Geelong's historic monuments such as the Barwon Sewer Aqueduct.

The Geelong Historical Records Centre was created as a result of significant effort by the Geelong Historical Society, and in 1979, was made an approved place of deposit for historic local government records under the Public Records Act. It is second only to the Public Record Office Victoria for the size of a public archive in Victoria,

The society publishes the quarterly magazine Investigator (ISSN 0021-0013) in March, June, September and December each year. There is a cumulative index for 1965 - 1984 and an updated digitised index on CD from 1965 up to 2009.

== Redevelopment ==
The Geelong Heritage Centre was temporarily housed in the National Wool Museum, while the new Geelong Library and Heritage Centre was being rebuilt. The new Geelong Library and Heritage Centre, was erected on the site of the former Geelong Volunteer Fire Brigade Station (which was demolished in 1918) and the former library adjacent to the Geelong War Memorial and Geelong Art Gallery. The centre's new building, which has been designed by the Melbourne architectural firm, ARM Architecture, features a unique geodesic dome constructed of glass and reinforced concrete, has been described as "... an iconic addition to Geelong's architectural and cultural landscape". The centre covers over 6,000 square metres, and includes a children's exploration and discovery zone, a youth area, as well as a heritage centre repository, which w will hold 120,000 print and multimedia collection items. The cost of the redevelopment has been put at A$45 million. The fractured dome design uses over 400 prefabricated glass-reinforced concrete tiles, which make up the sphere roof, which was described by ARM Architecture technical director Wayne Sanderson as having been ... modelled on the domes of great historical buildings.

The design of the building references the domes of the great libraries of the world, Library of Congress and the State Library domed reading room. Clad in 332 panels of glass reinforced concrete, which ...reinforce the appearance of a geodesic dome and allow the building to harmonise with its surrounding masonry neighbours. These included the classical Geelong Art Gallery and old Geelong Town Hall, the Art Deco courthouse and the brutalist State Government Offices.

The new building was opened by Geelong Mayor Darryn Lyons on 21 November 2015.

== Holdings and exhibits ==
The Library and Heritage Centre contains over 1 million items, including a large lending and reference collection and specialist scientific collections such as the John Raddenberry Fern and Lycopod collection. the local history collection is housed in the Vault Kim barne thaliyu on level 3, a dedicated space housing specialist resources for the local history of Geelong and surrounds.

== Opening and reception ==
The opening exhibition in the gallery space was attended by 21,000 visitors visiting the building in the first week of opening, and 10,000 per week subsequently. The opening was noted in print and electronic media with the focus on the role of the unusual architecture in the revitalisation in Geelong. The building won the 2015 State Award for Excellence by the Concrete Institute of Australia, which recognises significant contributions to technology and design innovation. Additionally, the designing architectural firm, ARM Architecture, was praised by the design and architectural community for their work on the Geelong Library and was awarded the Victorian Architecture Medal, the William Wardell Award for Public Architecture and the Marion Mahoney Award, the Regional Prize and the national Sir Zelman Cowen Award for Public Architecture in 2016.
