= Norm Houghton (historian) =

Australian historian

Norman Houghton OAM
- Born: 1948 (age 77–78)
- Citizenship: Australia
- Occupation: Historian
- Organization(s): Geelong Heritage Centre; Light Railway Research Society of Australia

Norman Houghton OAM (born 1948) is an Australian historian and archivist in Geelong, Victoria, who has published more than 40 books, many focusing on timber tramways and sawmills of the Otway and Wombat Forests of Western Victoria, Australia. Most of his works have been self-published, while he has provided numerous articles to the newsletter and journal of the Light Railway Research Society of Australia.

== Early life ==
Houghton grew up in Colac in southwest Victoria and attended Monash University, graduating in history. His interest in railway and forest history of Victoria's Otway Ranges was nurtured from an early age and resulted in his documentation and mapping of more than 300 sawmills and 160 kilometres of timber tramlines, which were built in the area from the 1850s to the mid 20th century.

Houghton worked at Sovereign Hill Historical Gold Mining Village and the Gold Museum in Ballarat and undertook assessment of the archives of the Queensland Railways, before operationally establishing the Geelong Heritage Centre as its foundation Director in 1979, where he held the role of archivist with the Geelong Historical Records Centre for many decades, and was instrumental in assisting the Geelong Historical Society to collate and compile records which formed the basis of the Heritage Centre archival collection.

== Forestry research ==
Houghton's primary research on sawmills and timber tramways has been used as the basis for comprehensive assessments of the value of forest heritage sites, for example by the Victorian Department of Conservation and Natural Resources, for conservation management of heritage places, and also to further the investigation of domestic and spatial arrangements of isolated bush settlements. His publications include histories of the sawmills and tramways of the Wombat and Otway Forests and have been described as "...part of his substantial legacy ... of the lives led by timber-getters, road-makers, railway workers, farmers, and others in the communities that battled with the high rainfall, heavily timbered, and steep landscapes of this unique part of Victoria."

His research has been acknowledged by the Australian Forest History Society, while Gregg Borschmann, in the People's Forest Oral History Project, noted that he had:

...documented and mapped more than 300 sawmills & 160 kilometres of timber tramlines built in the area since the 1850s of which ...[spending] every Sunday for 4 years in the bush; his conclusions, based on his field work experience, that there had been no real appreciation of the heritage value of forests by bulldozer drivers and current foresters, much of the archaeological remains of our non-Aboriginal forest culture had been destroyed; that the current generation of forest managers at the district level had very little knowledge of the history of their resource.

Houghton's contribution to forestry history has been recognized in a number of recent surveys of Australian and Victorian forest history, particularly in undertaking the primary field work which has relocated the isolated bush settlements, mill sites and tramway networks, and in the compilation of oral histories. He provided a large proportion of the entries to the first annotated bibliography of forest history, was a co-founder of, and subsequently contributed to most of the national conferences on Australian forest history since its inception. He is also credited as a major contributor to the reinvigoration of heritage protection and tourism in forest areas through his publications and promotion of timber tramway trails.

Houghton is club historian for The Geelong Club for which he has written several histories.

== Awards ==
In the 2021 Australia Day Honours Houghton was awarded the Order of Australia Medal for services to community history.

== Selected publications ==
Some of Houghton's research has been self-published and distributed through the Light Railway Research Society of Australia (LRRSA). He has also been a regular contributor to the LRRSA newsletter, and its journal Light Railways, and to the newsletter of the Australian Forest History Society. Many of his other works have been published by local history societies.

- West Otways Narrow Gauge (1973)
- Sawdust and Steam: A history of the railways and tramways of the eastern Otway Ranges (1975)
- Forrest: The first 85 years (1976)
- Barongarook: A rural portrait (1979)
- Timber and Gold: A history of the sawmills and tramways of the Wombat Forest, 1855-1940 (1980)
- The Saddle Line: A history of the Moriac to Wensleydale railway (1982)
- A Century of Country Clay: Selkirk, the first 100 years, 1883-1983 (1983)
- Beech Forest: A century on the ridge (1984)
- Timber Mountain: A sawmilling history of the Murrindindi forest, 1885-1950 (1986)
- Geelong Historical Records Centre: A foundation history Geelong Historical Records Centre (1988)
- The Beechy: The life and times of the Colac-Beech Forest-Crowes narrow gauge railway, 1902-1962 (1992)
- Hitchcock, Geelong's visionary: The life and times of Howard Hitchcock 1866 to 1932 (2002)
- Geelong: A short history (2003)
- Beechy Rail: Historical and engineering guide to the old Beechy line rail trail (2005)
- By the Barwon: A history of Forrest and Barramunga (2005)
- The Ridge: A brief historical guide to the West Otway Ridge (2005)
- Homes in the Hills: Historic glimpses of Barongarook, Gellibrand, Banool and Carlisle River (2006)
- Beech Forest: Capital on the ridge (2007)
- Copper at the 'Curry: The 1917 copper boom railways of Cloncurry and their aftermath (2008)
- Excuse Me Sisters Please: A Colac school yard memoir (2008)
- A Gentle Place: Jubilee History of the Geelong Club 1959 to 2009 (2009)
- Drink Up Gents: History of Colac and District Hotels (2011)
- End of the Line: The Beech Forest to Crowes Extension Railway (2011)
- Millaa Rails: History of the Tolga to Millaa Millaa railway (2011)
- Games at the "Ditch": History of the Beech Forest Sports ground (2011)
- A Grand Parade: History of the Colac Show Grounds (2011)
- Sawdust and Steam: A history of the railways and tramways of the eastern Otway Ranges (revised edition 2011)
- Closed 50 Years Ago: The Colac to Beech Forest Railway (2012)
- The Onion Line: A History of the Colac to Alvie Railway 1923–1954 (2012)
- A Land of Milk and Onions: The rise and fall of mixed dairy farming in the Colac Shire (2013)
- Wombat Woodsmen: Sawmills and timber tramways of the Wombat State Forest 1853 to 2008 (2013)
- Rail Centre Colac: Rail Stations in the Colac Shire 1877–2014 (2014)
- Gentlemen Only: History of the Riverine Club (2016)
- God's House: A History of Churches in Colac and District (2016)
- Murrumbidgee Gentlemen: History of the Murrumbidgee Club (2016)
- Scrapers and Boilers: Beeac's Lake Salt Trade 1868–1968 (2016)
- A Trail on the Rail: Railway History of the Ballarat to Skipton Rail Trail (2016)
- Homes in the Hills: Historic Glimpses of Barongarook, Gellibrand, Banool and Carlisle River (2017)
- Wollundry Ladies Club History 1964 – 2016 (2017) Joint author with Robyn Gooden
- Choppers and Chippers: A history of the timber industry in the West Otway Ranges 1850 to 2018 (2018)
- To Warrnambool Stopping All Stations: Warrnambool Line Railway Stations (2021)
