= Robert Gartland =

Australian historian and philanthropist

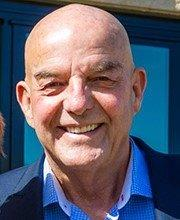
Robert Gartland 2025

Robert ('Bob') John Gartland OAM (born 1954) is an Australian businessperson, historian and recipient of the Medal of the Order of Australia in 2024.

== Business ==
Gartland founded Gartland Real Estate (Geelong) in 1999. In 2010, Gartland Real Estate won the 'Commercial Services' award at the Geelong Business Excellence Awards.

== Collections & Research ==
After selling Gartland Real Estate, Gartland’s focus moved from commerce to recording and collecting history with a focus on Geelong.

In 2022, the National Trust recognised Gartland for his work in identifying important historical sites in the Geelong region.

The Gartland Collection is a large private collection of historically and culturally important artefacts, objects, images, and sound recordings relating to Australian football. Some of the collection is housed in the Bob Gartland Heritage Centre at Kardinia Park.

Curated by Gartland, a further sample of his collection went on public display at Geelong Gallery from September-November 2019.

In 2015, Gartland published a digital product -The Greatest Team of All - a 15-year project that aimed to document every player of the Geelong Football Club. The Greatest Team of All features 1228 players from 1877.

Deakin University lists him as an Affiliate member and on the Advisory Board at the Centre for Contemporary Histories."

In 2026, Gartland was a contributor to an initiative 'Geelong Sporting Life', alongside the Geelong Football Club, Geelong Sports Museum, Barwon Sports Academy and Deakin University’s Centre for Contemporary Histories.

== Geelong Football Club ==
As part of recording and collecting history, Gartland spent twelve years as a Director of the Geelong Football Club including documenting its history. During this time, he founded the Geelong Football Club’s History Society, serving as its inaugural Chair. He also chaired the Club's Honouring the Past Committee and its History and Tradition Committee. In 2017, Gartland was inducted as a Life Member and in 2022 as a recipient of the RJ Hickey Award from the Geelong Football Club.

Community Service

Gartland is the Patron of community hospice Anam Cara House Geelong chaired by Diana Taylor.

Gartland is also listed as a contributor assisting in the establishment of the Geelong Sports Museum.

In 2024, Gartland was recognised for his work in service to the Geelong community with a Medal of the Order of Australia and was also awarded an Honorary Doctorate from Deakin University.
