= IG Anderson =

Australian architect

Illiffe Gordon Anderson (1890–1963), usually known as IG Anderson, was an Australian architect, practicing in Melbourne and later Tasmania, who is noted for his sometimes unusually expressive 1930s commercial and apartment designs.

== Career ==
Born in South Yarra in Melbourne in 1890, he with his family relocated to Geelong in 1910. After studying architecture at the Gordon Institute of Technology in Geelong, he set up practice in that town by 1916.

His first notable commission that still stands is the Mildura Club, in the far northern Victorian town of Mildura, prominently sited on a corner with a round portico entry. The design won a competition with 60 entries, and led to further commissions in town, notably the tall Memorial Clock Tower attached to the library.

Through the 1920s he designed numerous commercial, industrial and residential buildings in Geelong, including the grand CML Building, as well as the Geelong West Town Hall, both in a Stripped Classical style.

In 1930, he relocated to Melbourne, and that year designed the Brunswick Market, intended to be a form of early supermarket. It employed an unusual stylised Spanish/Medieval expression, and was followed by the similarly styled Avon Butter Factory in Fitzroy two years later.

He then embraced the new Moderne (Art Deco) style, including many apartment blocks and private houses. His first designs in this mode were noted for introducing novel forms, for instance the Avenue Court flats in South Melbourne were reported in 1934 as showing how "deeply the machine era is impressing itself on residential work".

Some of his designs are today regarded as outstanding for their period, with more dynamic forms and idiosyncratic details than most contemporary works. For instance the Dorijo Flats and Lonsdale House (demolished) feature a small turret composed of interlocking flat plates, while the Ostend Flats feature a waterfall motif tower, a large stylised version of a common Art Deco motif. The Avenue Court and Park Gate flats both feature curves within curved elements, while Tufnell Lodge at 2 Garden Avenue employs a dense layering of differing angles as well as a curve in the street facade.

In this period he was particularly active in East Melbourne, designing about a dozen small blocks of flats, with many built in the first years of WWII, including five blocks which take up most of the newly laid out cul-de-sac of Garden Avenue. Notwithstanding the sometimes elaborate designs, he was highly regarded by clients for working within budget.

Later during WWII he worked for the United States Army, before relocating to Hobart, Tasmania, in 1947, in practice with his son Leslie Gordon Anderson. Projects included a railway station, government offices, and many motels throughout Tasmania. He also became a councilor of the City of Hobart (1950–54), and designed their Coat of Arms in 1951. He died in Hobart on 1 August 1963.

== Selected projects ==
1921 : Mildura Club, Deakin Avenue, Mildura

1922 : Memorial Clock Tower, Deakin Avenue, Mildura

1924 : Geelong West City Hall, 153 Pakington Street, Geelong West

1926 : Belcher's Corner, 141-149 Ryrie Street, Geelong (demolished 2020)

1927 : The Block, 127 Little Malop Street, Geelong

1927: CML Insurance Building, 74 Malop Street, Geelong

1930 : Brunswick Market, corner Ballarat Street and Sparta Place, Brunswick

1932 : Avon Butter Factory, 218-222 Nicholson Street, Fitzroy

1934 : Dorijo, Victoria Parade, East Melbourne

1934 : Avenue Court, 64 Victoria Avenue, Albert Park

1935 : Ostend Flats, 29 Seacombe Grove, Brighton

1935 : Park Gate, 352 Albert Road, South Melbourne

1936 : Abrahams House, 3 Elwood Street, Brighton

1936 : Lonsdale House, Lonsdale Street, Melbourne (demolished 2010)

1937 : Mon Reve, 35 Hampden Road, Armadale

1938-41 : Flats (5), 1-3 and 2-16 Garden Avenue, 48-50 Wellington Parade, East Melbourne

c1941 : Pair of flats, 25 & 37 George Street, East Melbourne (which back onto Garden Avenue)

1940 : Flats, 51 George Street, East Melbourne

1942: Flats, 53 George Street, East Melbourne

== Gallery ==
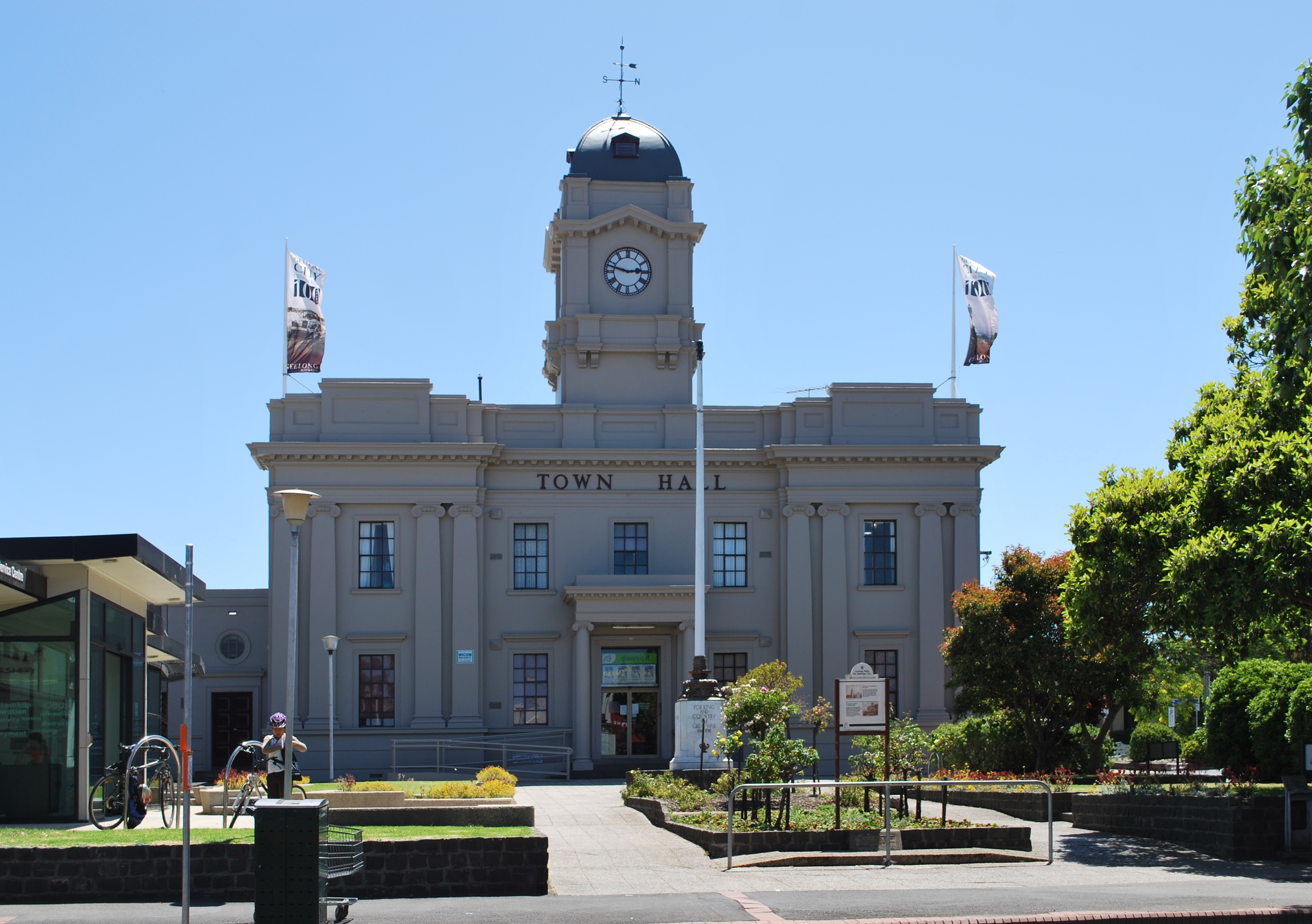
Geelong West Town Hall, 1924

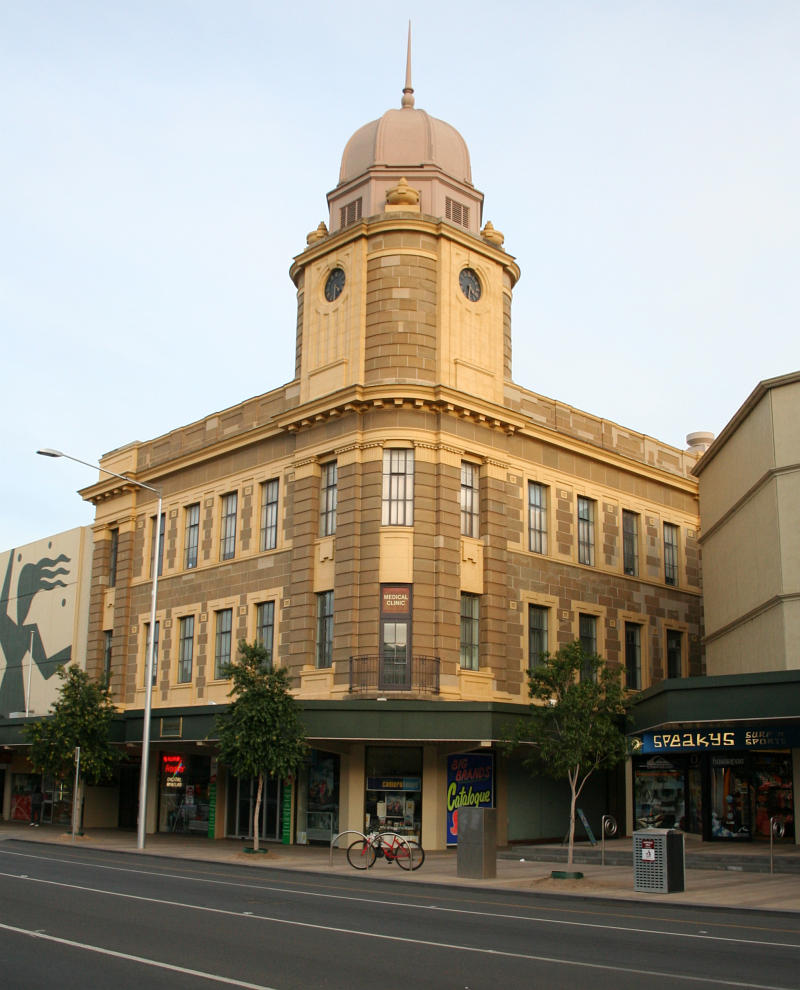
CML Building, Geelong

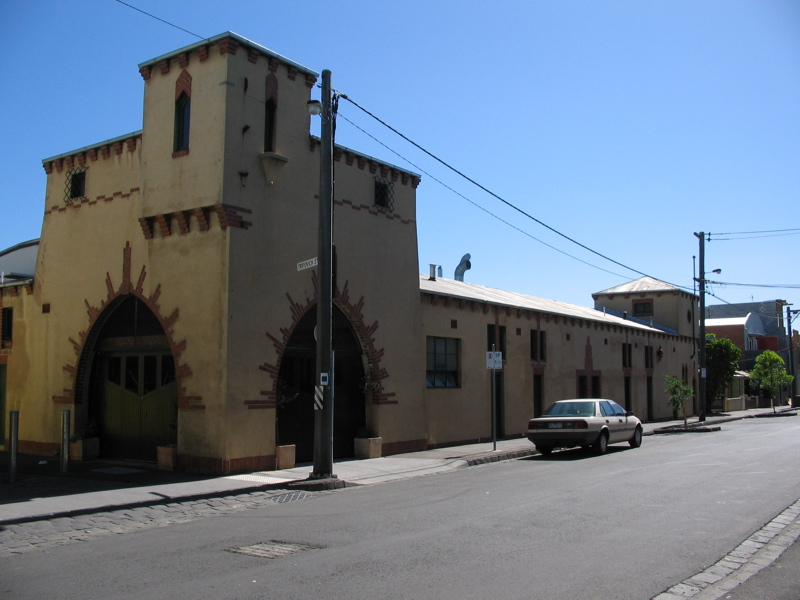
Brunswick Market, 1930

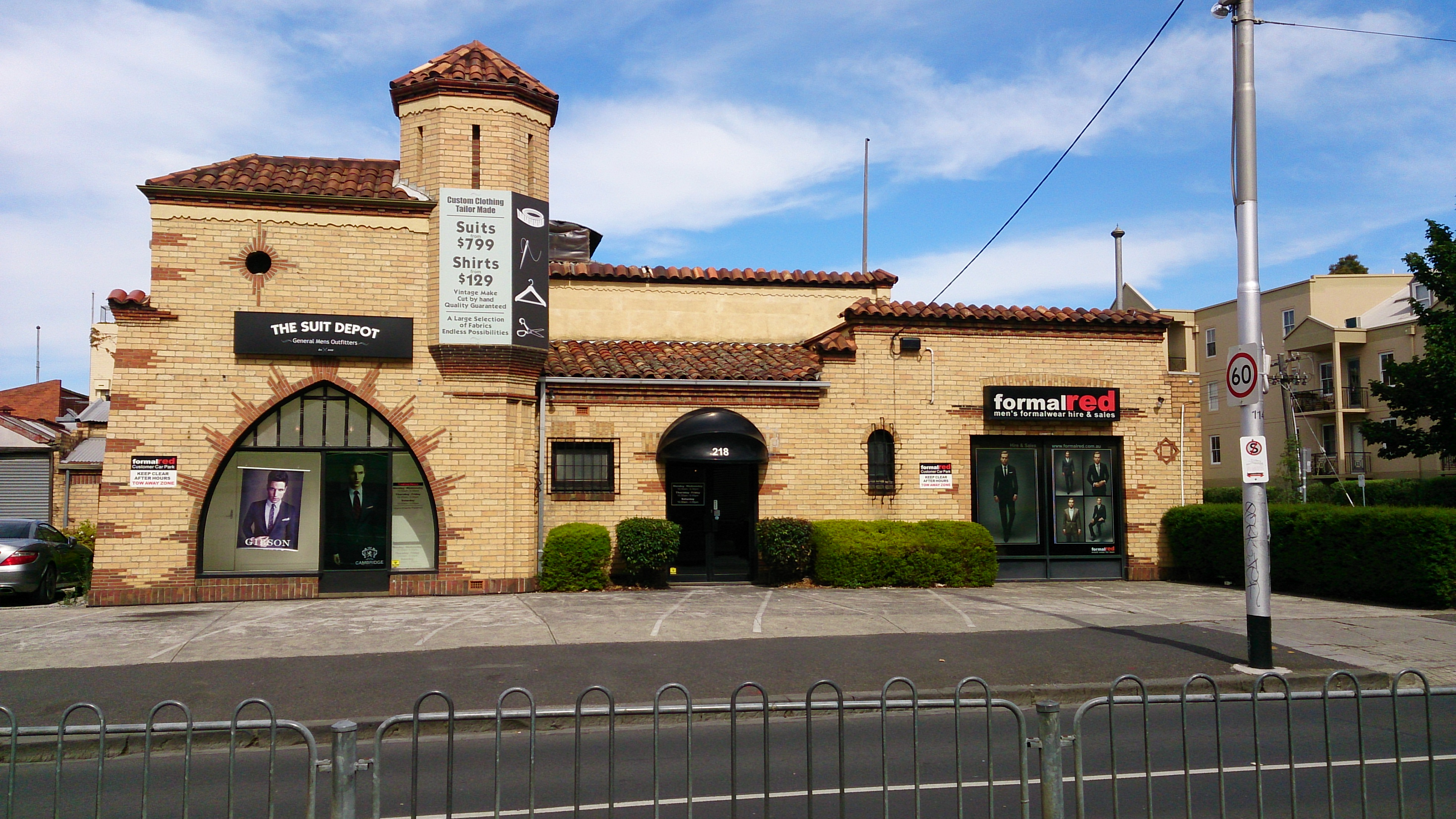
Avon Butter Factory, Fitzroy

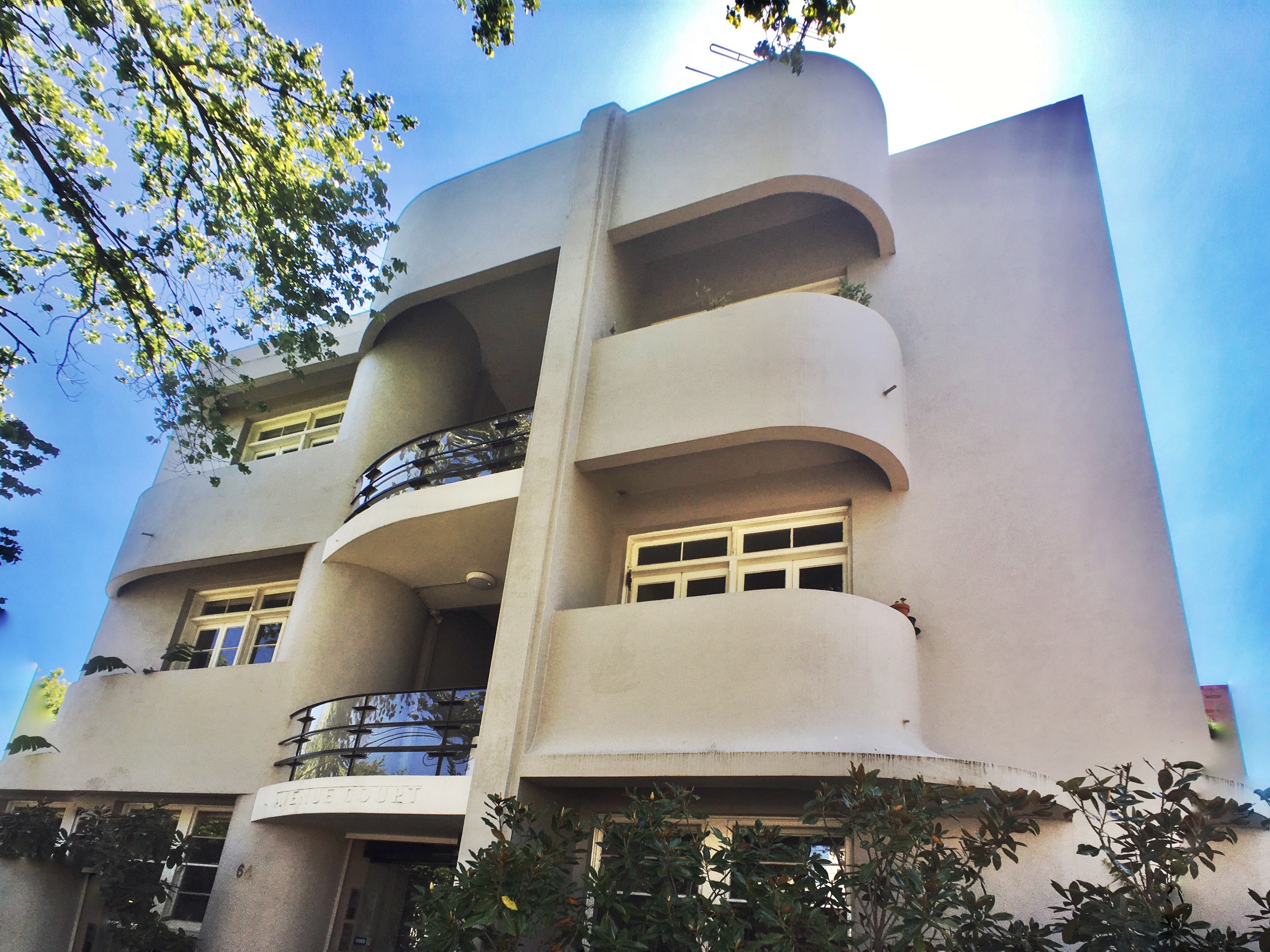
Avenue Court flats

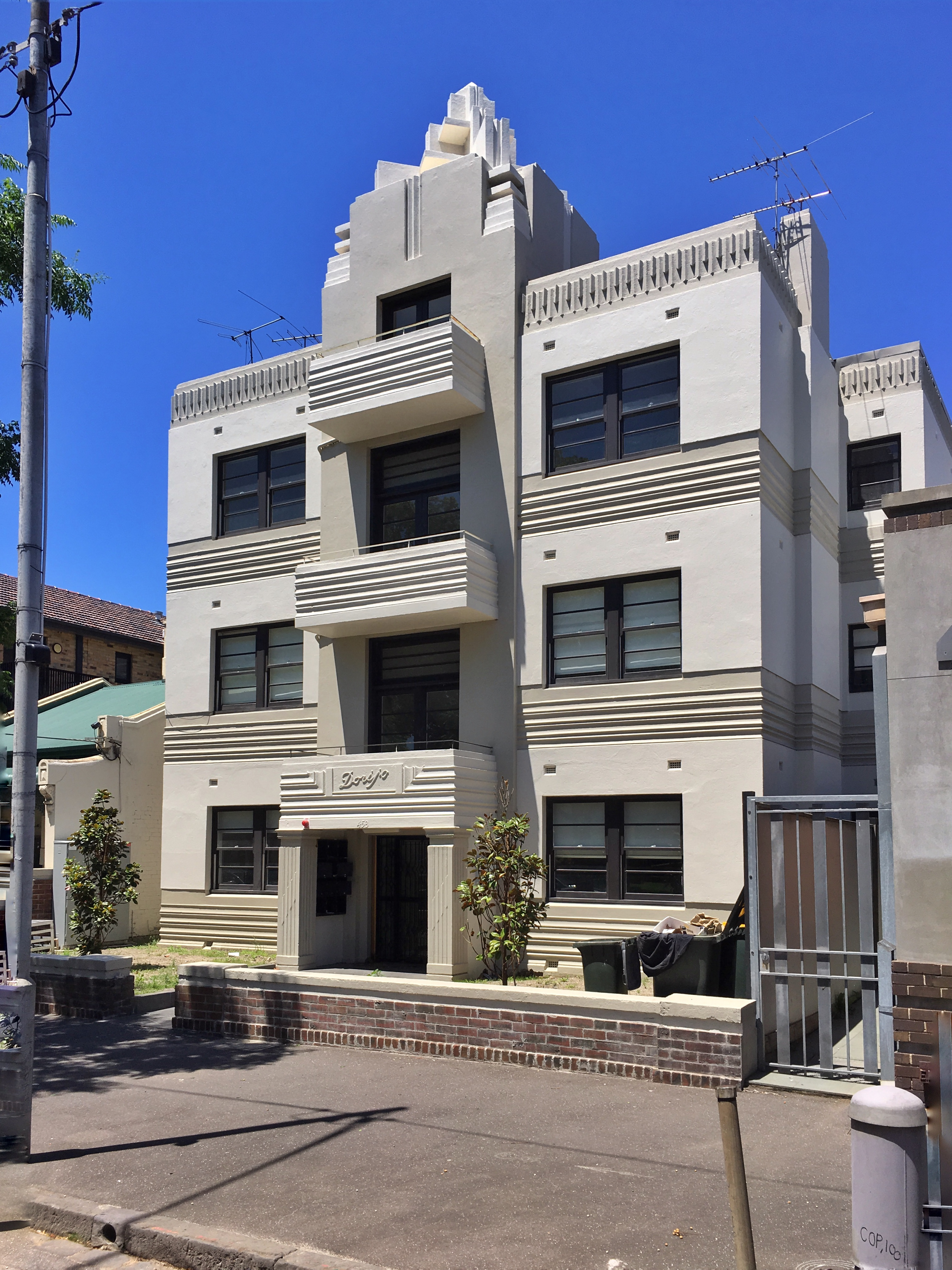
Dorijo, East Melbourne

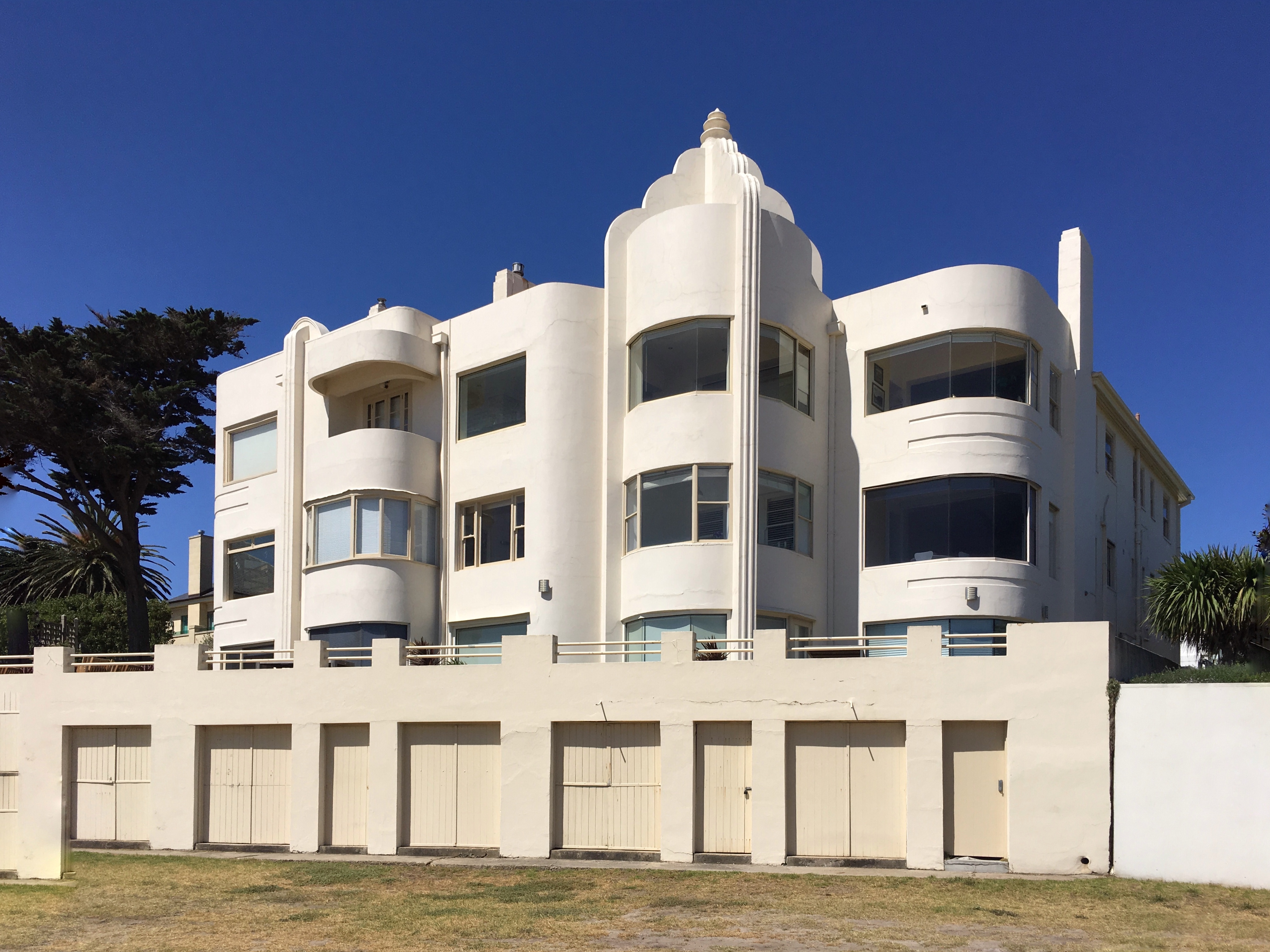
Ostend Flats, Brighton

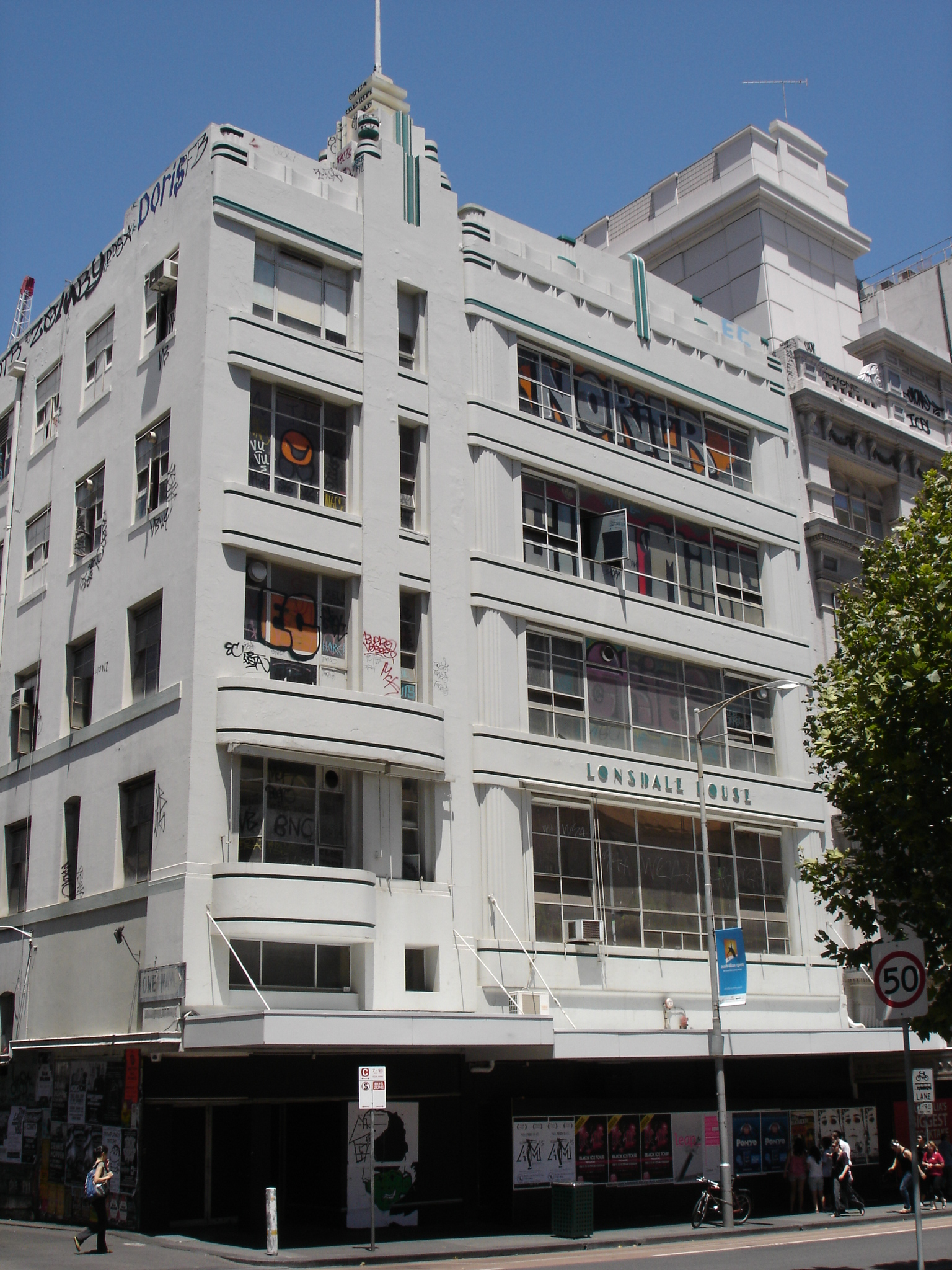
Lonsdale House

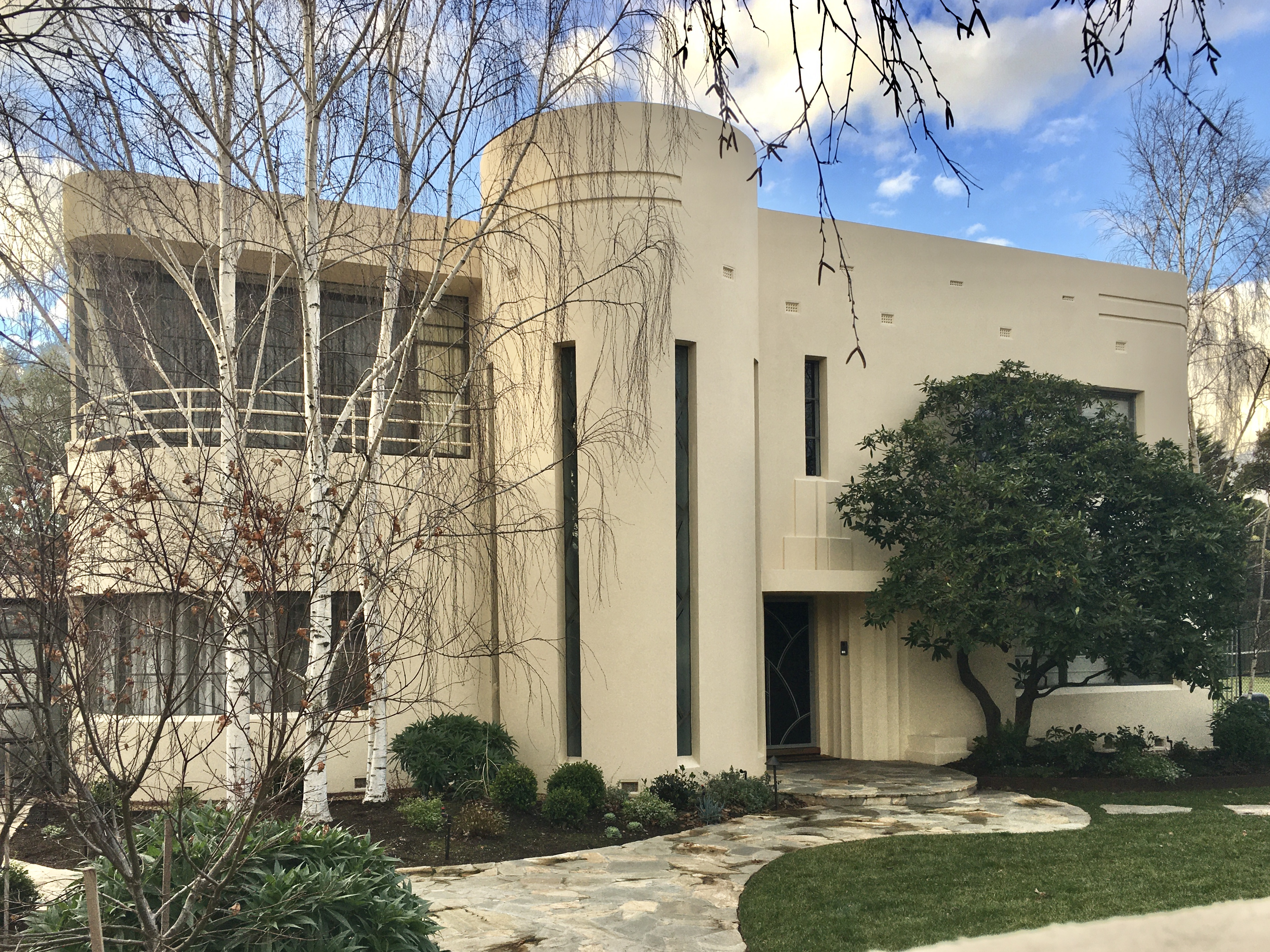
Abrahams House, Brighton

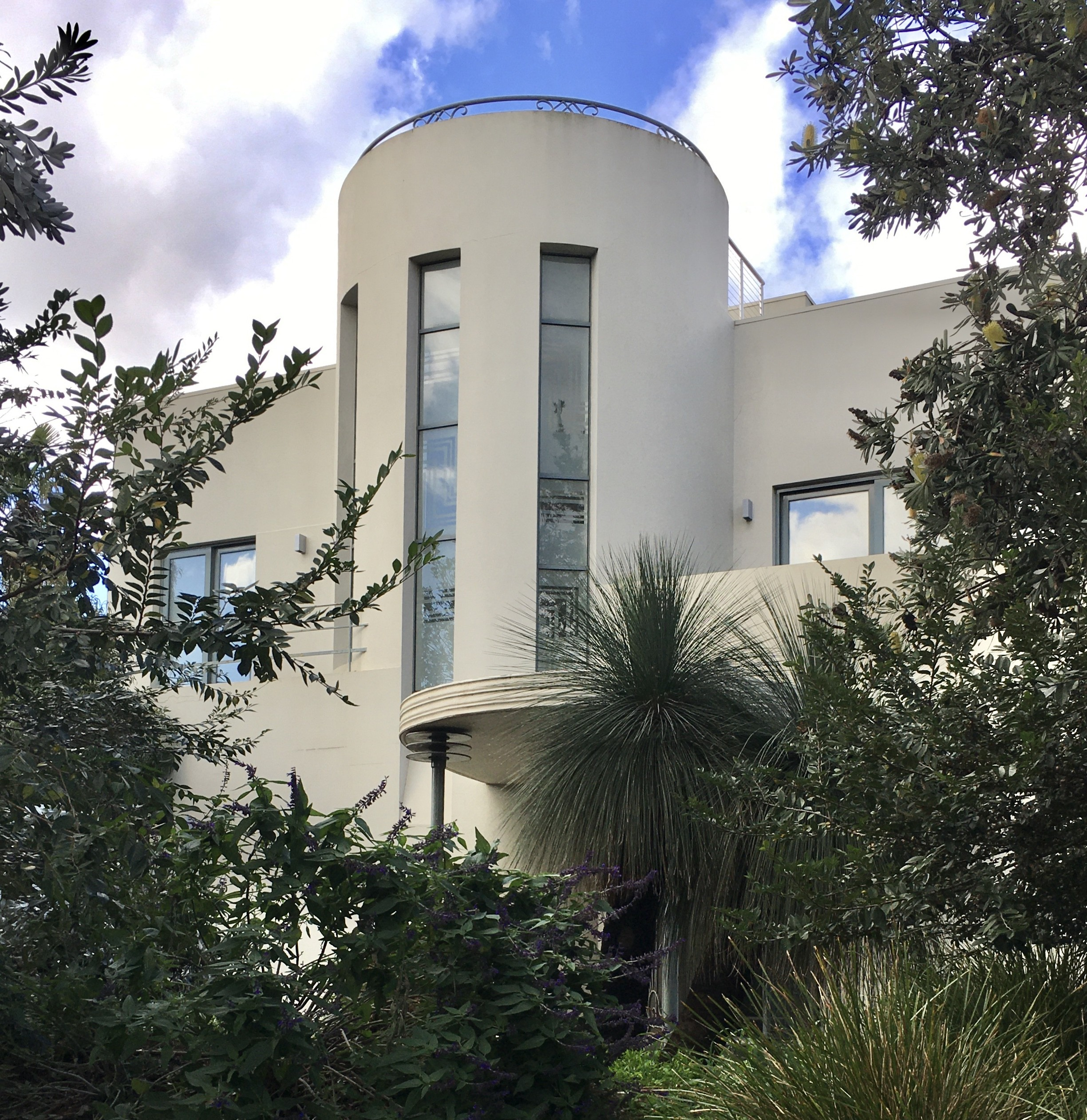
Mon Reve, Armadale

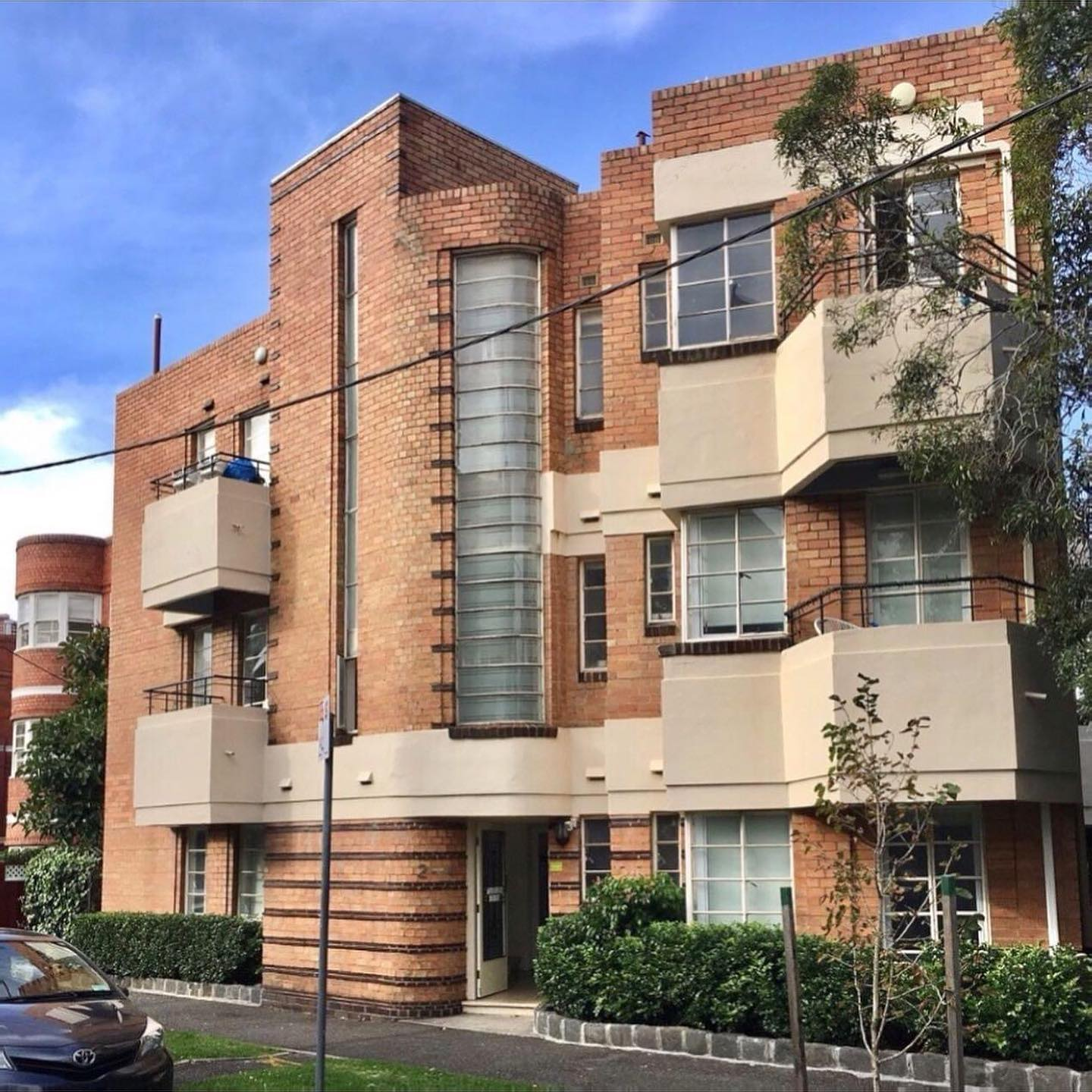
Tufnell Lodge, 2 Garden Avenue, East Melbourne

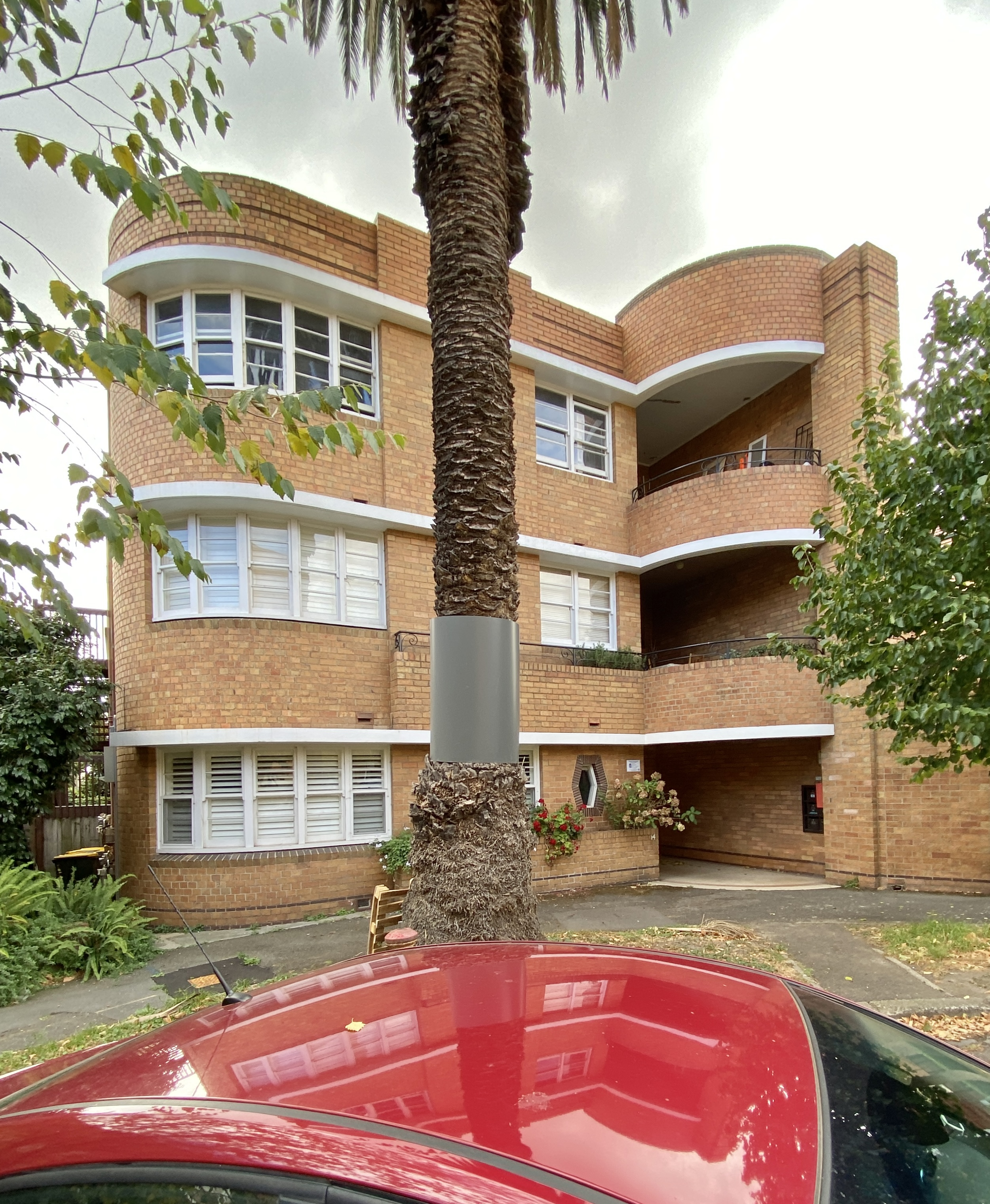
14 Garden Avenue, East Melbourne

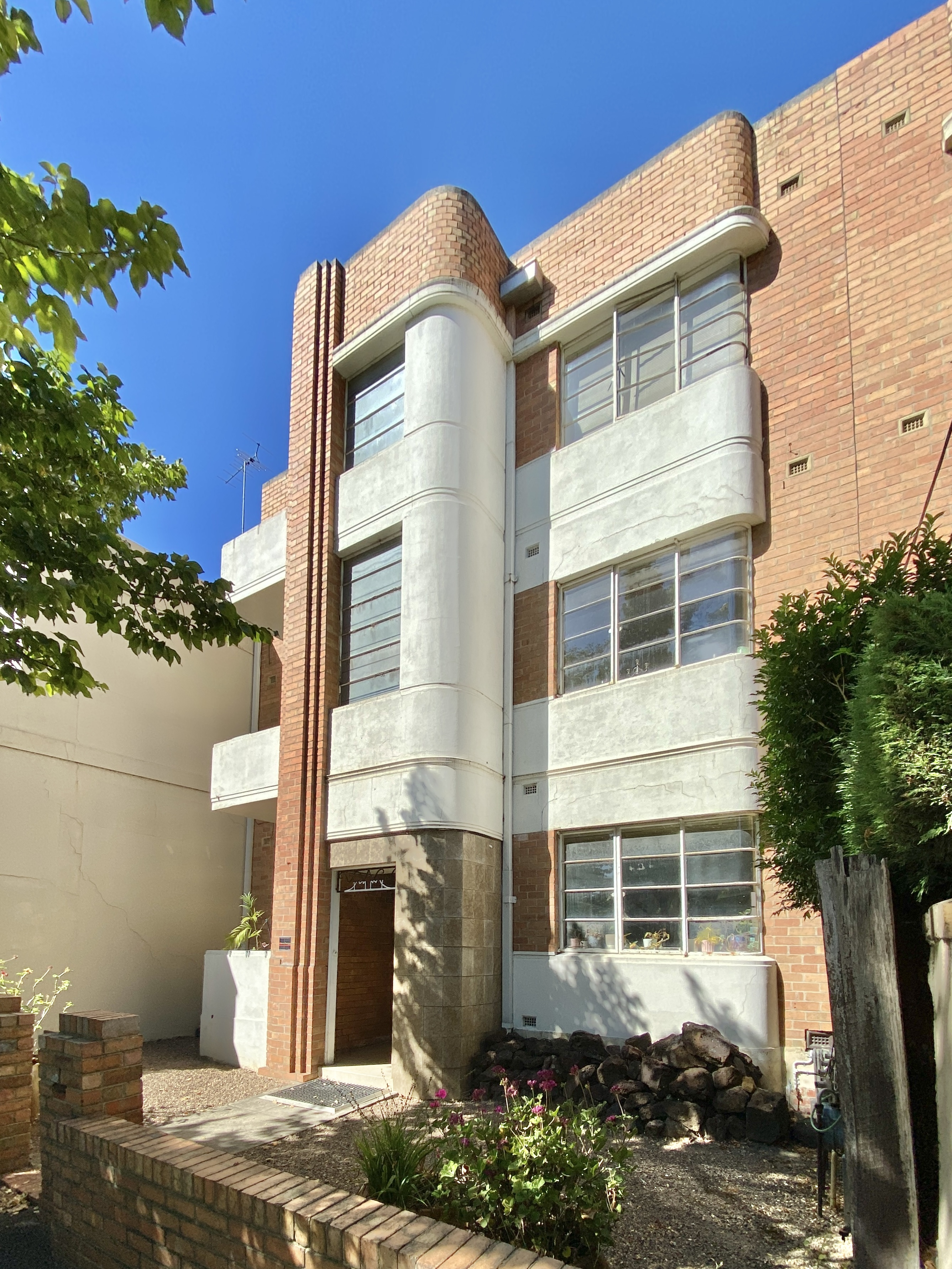
51 George Street, East Melbourne
