= A bush burial =

Painting by Frederick McCubbin

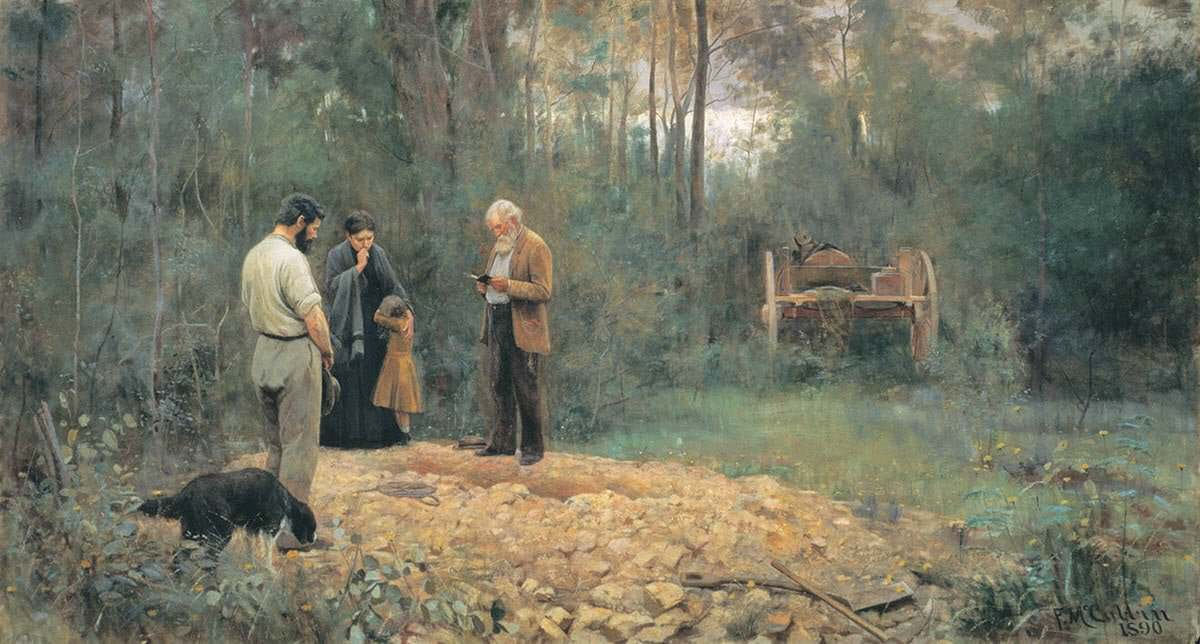
- Artist: Frederick McCubbin
- Year: 1890
- Medium: oil on canvas
- Dimensions: 122.5 cm × 224.5 cm (48.2 in × 88.4 in)
- Location: Geelong Gallery, Geelong
- Website: Gallery site

A bush burial (earlier known as The last of the pioneers) is an 1890 painting by the Australian artist Frederick McCubbin. The painting depicts a burial attended by a small group - an older man reading from a book, a younger man with a dog, and a woman and child. The relationships between the figures is unclear and its ambiguity and sentimental nature has seen the work described as a frontier example of the Victorian-era problem pictures. From the time the painting was shown at the Victorian Artists Society Winter Exhibition in 1890, there has been differing opinions on the story told by the work with "the critic for Table Talk magazine writ[ing] that the woman is newly widowed. In The Argus, she is the grief-stricken mother of a dead child." The Age referred to the "deceased, doubtless the wife of the grey-haired old man reading the service." The burial itself also refers to the memento mori tradition.

Like Dutch vanitas pictures of the 17th century – with their skulls and snuffed candles, and fruit and flowers past their use-by date – McCubbin is reminding the viewer of the inevitability of death. You can almost hear the words being read over the grave: “Earth to earth, ashes to ashes, dust to dust.

— Matthew Westwood,

The artist's models were Annie McCubbin, the artist's wife, as the woman and Louis Abrahams, a friend, as the younger man. The young girl is unknown and the older man was John Dunne, whom McCubbin approached in Collins Street stating "You are the right look for the figure in this painting".

== Legacy ==
In 1892, the Governor of Victoria, John Hope, 7th Earl of Hopetoun, offered a prize for the best poem based on A bush burial. Miss Ada Russell's entry was the winner out of at least fifty competitors.

Chilean-Australian artist Juan Davila recasts McCubbin's painting in his 2000 work also titled A bush burial which depicts a refugee passing through Australian immigration point.

The painting changed hand several times before it was purchased for the Geelong Gallery by public subscription in 1900. Reports from the time state the purchase price was £105 with £15 donated by the vendor. Lisa Sullivan, the curator of Geelong Gallery, believes that Abrahams was the vendor and the purchase was encouraged by McCubbin himself.

For a fledgling regional gallery it was a very significant acquisition, and continues to be, of course, It shows the people of Geelong really getting behind the establishment of the gallery.

— Lisa Sullivan,
