= Light Railways =

Australian railway magazine

- Editor: Bruce Belbin
- Categories: Rail transport
- Frequency: Bimonthly
- First issue: June 1960
- Company: Light Railway Research Society of Australia
- Country: Australia
- Based in: Surrey Hills, Melbourne, Victoria
- Website: www.lrrsa.org.au
- ISSN: 0727-8101

Light Railways is a magazine produced by the Light Railway Research Society of Australia (LRRSA). The subtitle is "Australia's Magazine of Industrial and Narrow Gauge Railways".

== History ==
The LRRSA started in the 1961 to foster interest in specialty railways such as for industry and tourism. As it originated in Victoria, much of its focus was at first on the timber tramways and other industrial railways of that state. Light Railways is credited as the most comprehensive source for research and history of timber tramways, the sawmilling industry and other light rail-using industries for the period 1850 to 1950, It has been credited with publishing the most thorough research on light railways in not just Australia, but worldwide.

The genesis of Light Railways magazine dates from 1960 when the founder of LRRSA, Frank Stamford, began printing and distributing among a small group of friends a duplicated "Shenley Valley Railway Quarterly Review". It gradually began to specialise in light railways, and became the "VLRRS Quarterly Review" in 1961. In 1963, it became "Light Railways", appearing in magazine format, but still using duplicated printing. Offset printing came in 1968 and from 1973 it appeared as a 6.5-by-9-inch (165 mm × 229 mm) magazine with photographs on the front cover, continuing as a quarterly.

Up until 1977, Light Railways contained brief news items as well as historical articles. In November 1977, a bi-monthly news publication, Light Railway News, was launched, containing research and site notes and news of industrial, heritage and tourist railways. This settled down into a simple folded A4 format and continued for 120 issues as a companion publication to "Light Railways" until 1997.

At this point, LRRSA Council decided upon a bold new departure to reinvigorate the Society. It would involve combining "Light Railways" and "Light Railway News" into a new bi-monthly "Light Railways" magazine, in A4 format and with ample use of colour. This magazine would not only be available on subscription but would also be distributed through newsagencies throughout Australia. A new editorial team of Bruce Belbin, Bob McKillop and John Browning was put together and the new format magazine began with No.139 in February 1998.

== Aims ==
Light Railways aims to document the history of Australia's industrial and private railways and also the government lines that were built to a narrower gauge than that adopted as "standard" in each state. Thus the 2 ft 6 in (762 mm) gauge lines of Victoria, the 2 ft (610 mm) gauge Innisfail Tramway in Queensland, and Zeehan & NE Dundas line in Tasmania have all featured. Articles and photographs constitute a comprehensive archive of Australia's industrial and narrow gauge railway history. Production, editorial and research standards are high.

Coverage extends to lines in surrounding countries where Australian economic and political influence prevailed, including Papua New Guinea, Fiji and the phosphate islands of the Pacific.

A range of well-researched articles remains the core content of the magazine. Industrial Railway News reports cover Australia's still existing industrial railways and feature Queensland sugar cane railways and the Pilbara iron ore railways as well as other remaining lines. Heritage and Tourist reports at the end of each issue constitute a running record of details that are otherwise difficult to locate. Topics include museums, railways and heritage issues. Research assists readers with historical research projects and features site visits and tours. Letters to the Editor are a lively source of information and discussion while Book Reviews aim to cover all significant relevant publications from Australia or overseas.

== Distribution ==
The LRRSA also has its meetings in Adelaide, Brisbane, Melbourne, and Sydney notified in the magazine, as well as a range of coming events on tourist and heritage railways. It is distributed to LRRSA members by a Society team based in Melbourne and to newsagents by Gordon & Gotch.

A listing of past articles can be found by following the link from "Publications" All past issues can be purchased in either hard copy or as downloadable .pdf files from the web.

== See also ==
- History of rail transport in Australia
- List of railroad-related periodicals
