= Johnstone Park =

Landscaped garden in Geelong, Victoria, Australia

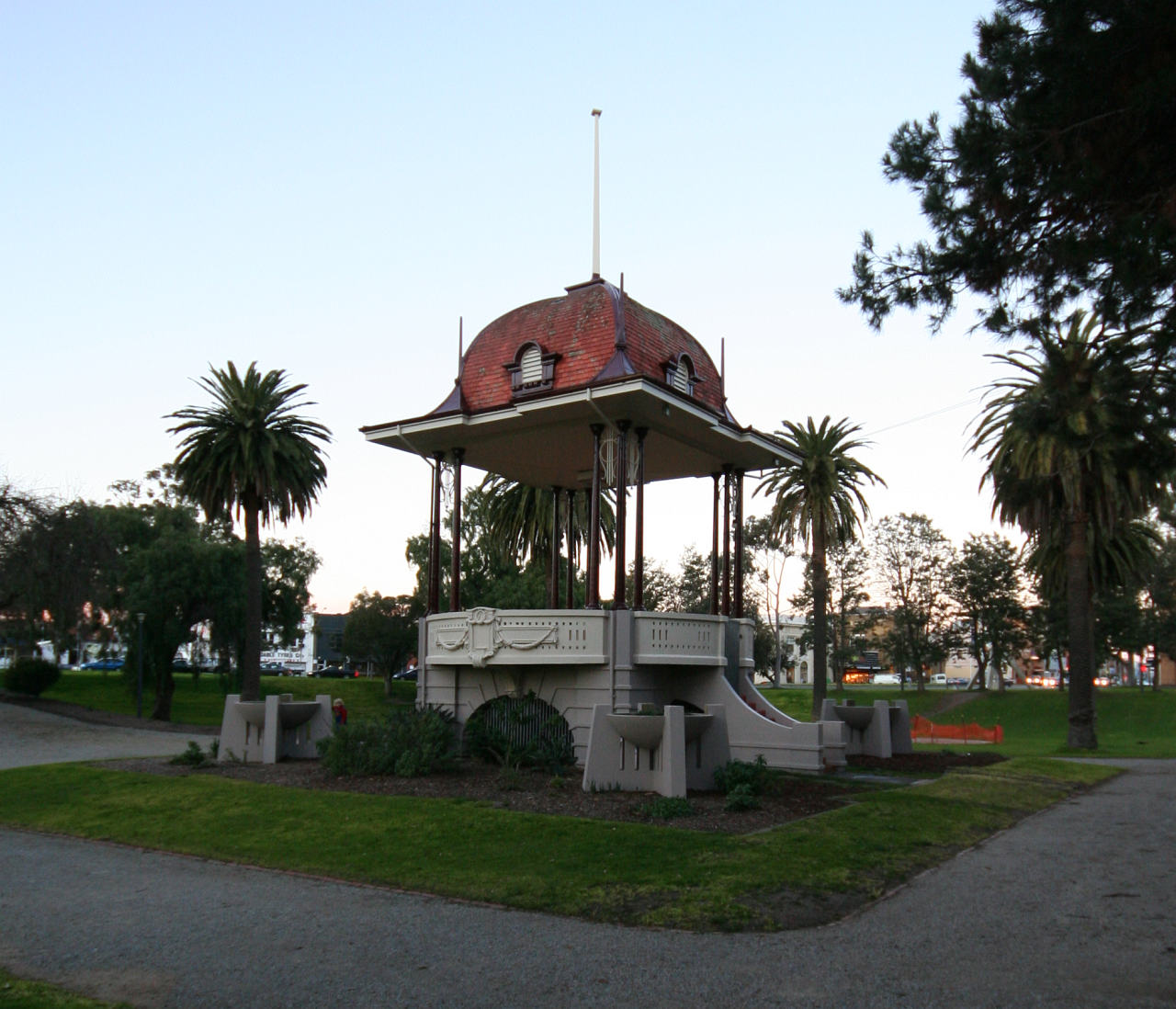
- Hitchcock Memorial Bandstand in the centre of the park
- Interactive map of Johnstone Park
- Type: Park
- Location: Geelong, Victoria
- Coordinates: 38.147°S 144.357°E
- Area: 2.5 hectares (6.2 acres)
- Opened: March 1872
- Owner: City of Greater Geelong
- Website: https://www.geelongcity.vic.gov.au/services/parks-and-outdoor-spaces/parks-and-reserves/johnstone-park

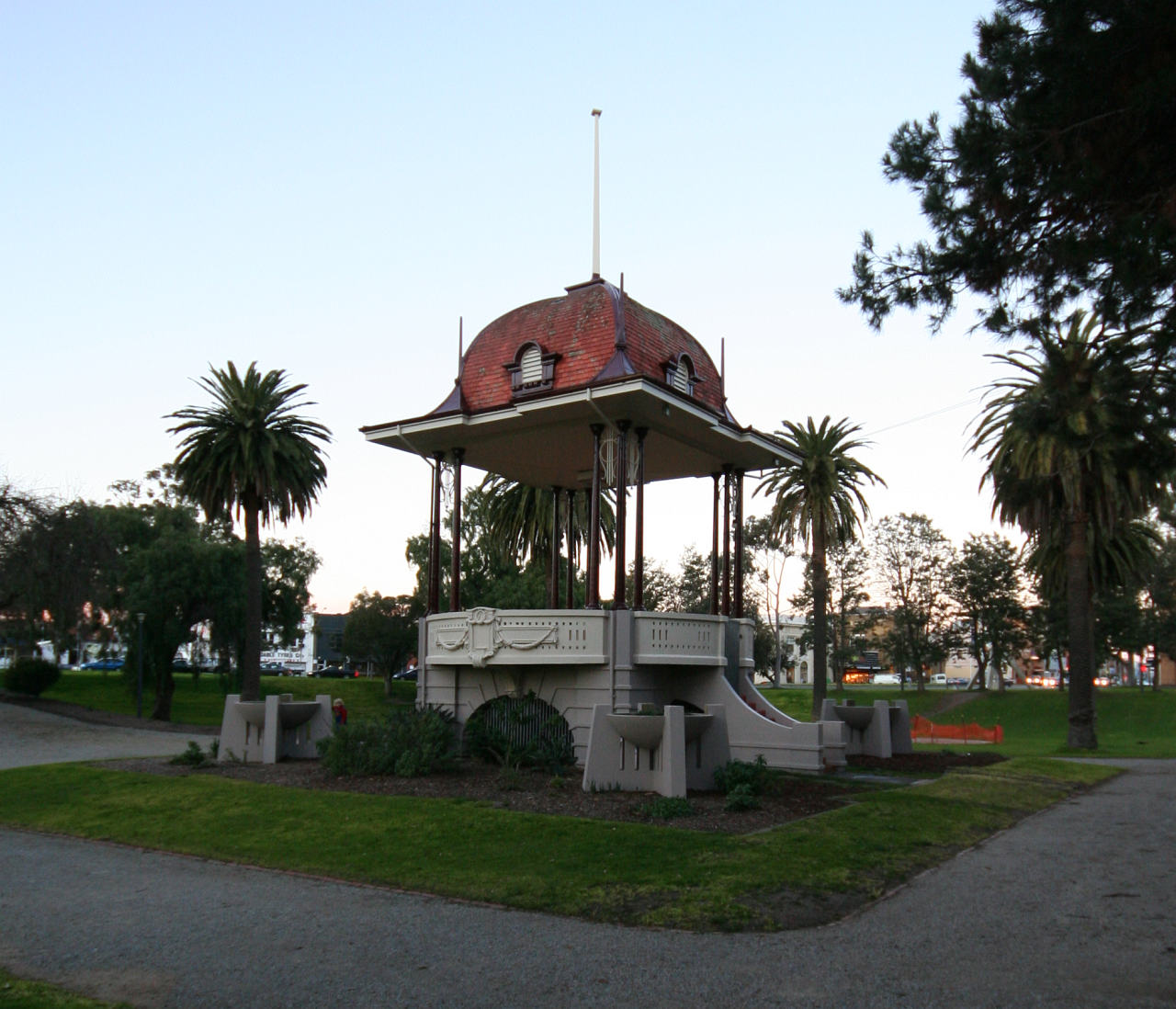
Hitchcock Memorial Bandstand in the centre of the park

Johnstone Park is a landscaped garden in Geelong, Victoria, Australia. It is bounded by Railway Terrace, Gheringhap Street, Little Malop Street, Fenwick Street, and Mercer Street. The park is surrounded by civic buildings including the Geelong City Hall, Geelong Art Gallery, Geelong Library, Geelong Law Courts, and the Geelong Railway Station. A war memorial and bandstand feature in the centre of the park.

== History ==
The area occupied by Johnstone Park was originally known as Western Gully, a watercourse that drained towards Corio Bay. In 1849 a dam was built at the downstream end of the gully, near the intersection of Gheringhap, Malop and Mercer streets. The dam was fenced off in 1851 after at least one person and several horses had drowned. The area was made into a park in March 1872, and named after former Geelong mayor Robert De Bruce Johnstone. The park stretched from Gheringhap Street to Latrobe Terrace. In December that year the first band concert was held by the Geelong Artillery Corps band. An octagonal wooden bandstand was erected in the park during November 1873. The Belcher Fountain was installed adjacent to the park in 1874, in the middle of the intersection of Gheringhap, Malop and Mercer streets. The fountain was a gift to the City of Geelong from former Mayor George Frederick Belcher.

The park was divided in 1872 when construction began on the extension of the Geelong railway south to Winchelsea. A footbridge was provided across the railway line. Johnstone Park was further reduced in size in 1887, when the Gordon Technical College was built on western section of the park.

1915 saw the Geelong Art Gallery built on the Little Malop Street boundary of the park. In 1926, it was complemented by a war memorial to commemorate the lives of local men lost in World War I, which comprised a Peace Memorial beside the gallery and an ornamental gateway at the Railway Terrace entrance to the park. A 1919 bandstand in the centre of the park is located on the axis of the Peace Memorial building and the gateway, and is listed on the Victorian Heritage Register.

The Belcher Fountain was relocated to Johnstone Park in 1912 because it was in the way of the tracks being installed for the introduction of electric trams in Geelong. The fountain was moved back to its original position in 1956 when the tram system closed. It was removed in 2006 to be restored and was re-installed close to its original location in 2008.

Princess Alexandra of Kent briefly visited the park in 1959, after returning from a stay at Talindert Homestead in Camperdown. She was greeted by a crowd of approximately 25,000 people, before returning to Melbourne.

== Gallery ==
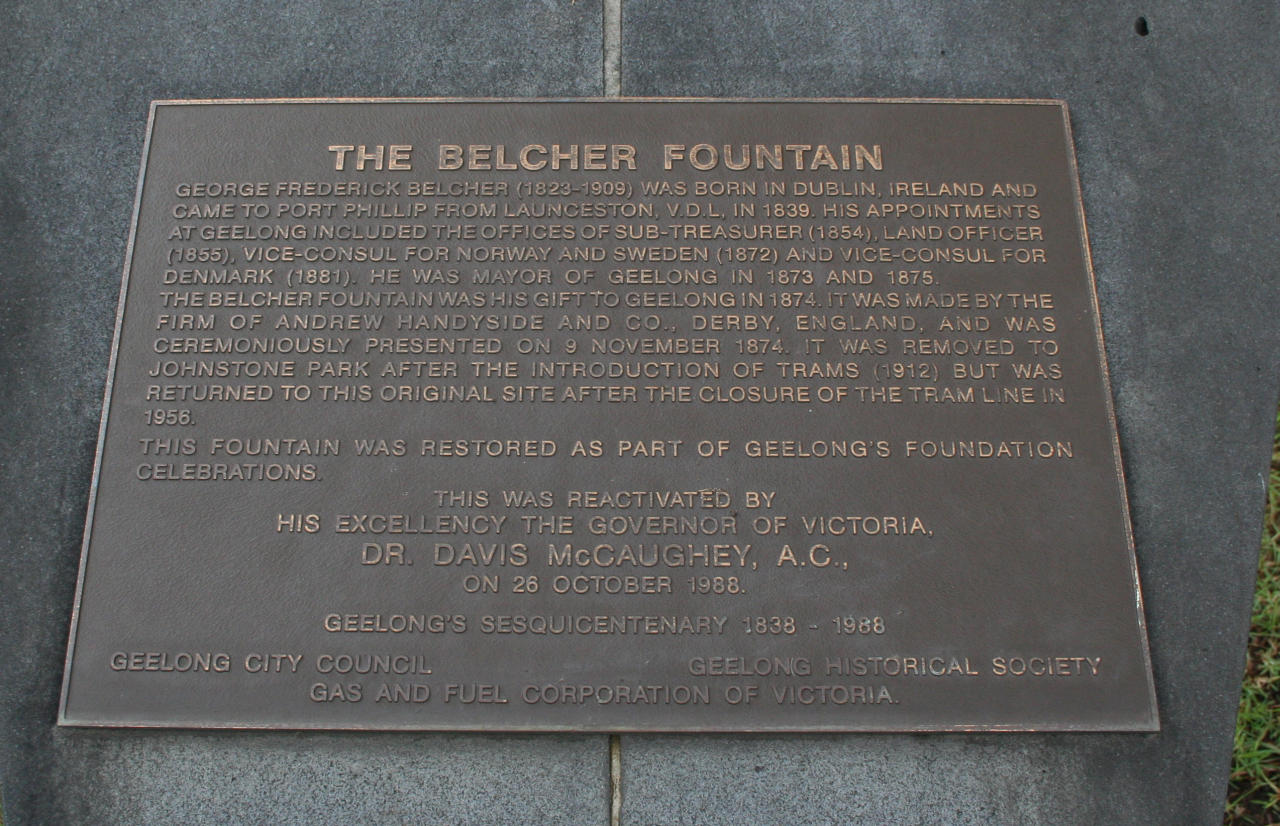
Plaque detailing history of Belcher Fountain

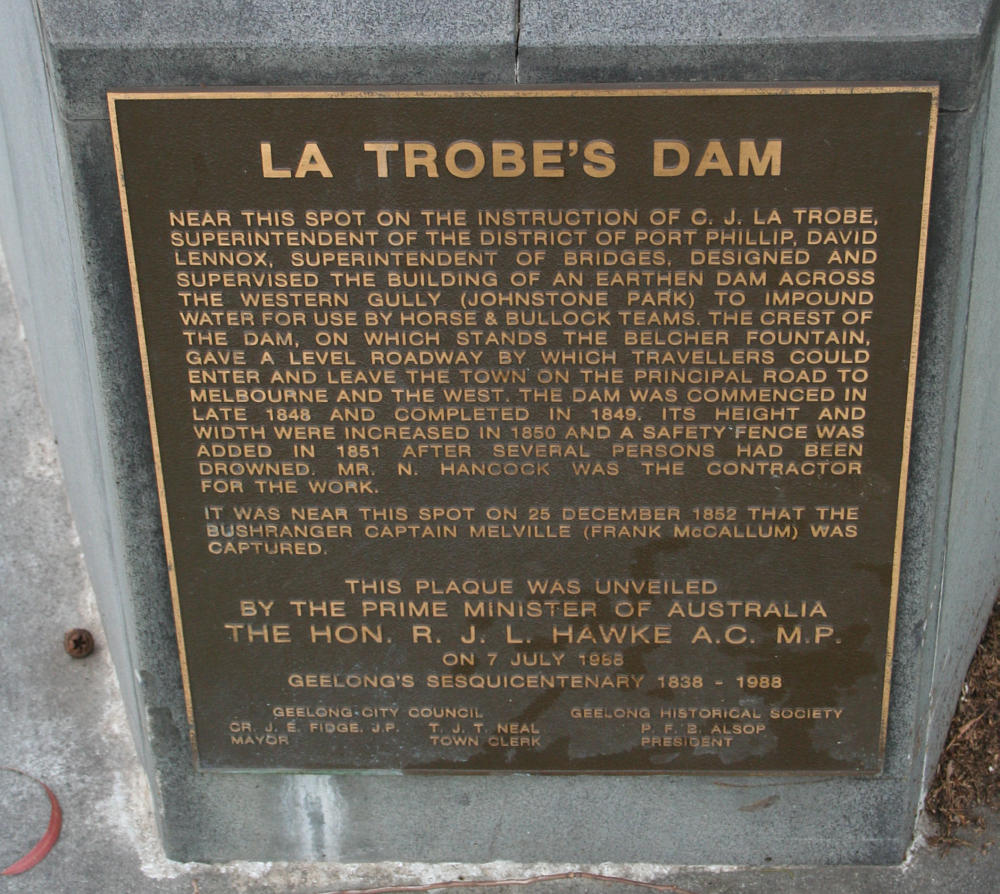
Plaque detailing history of Johnstone Park and LaTrobe Dam.

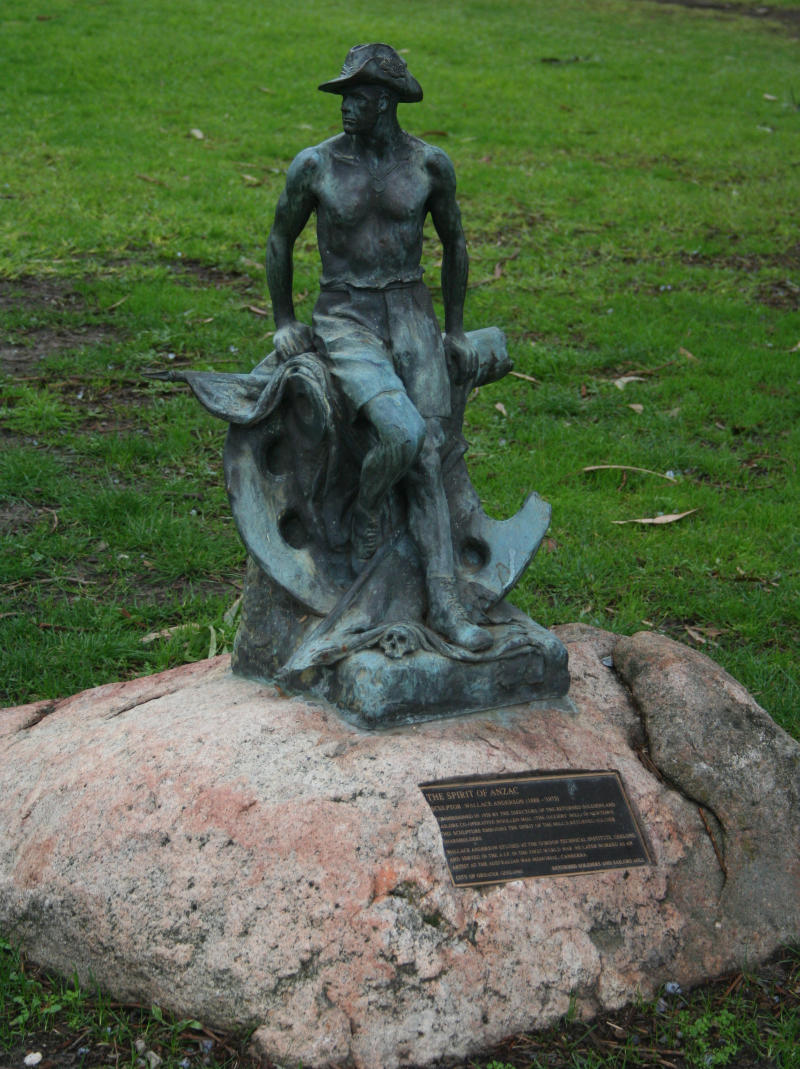
'The Spirit of Anzac' sculpture at Johnstone Park

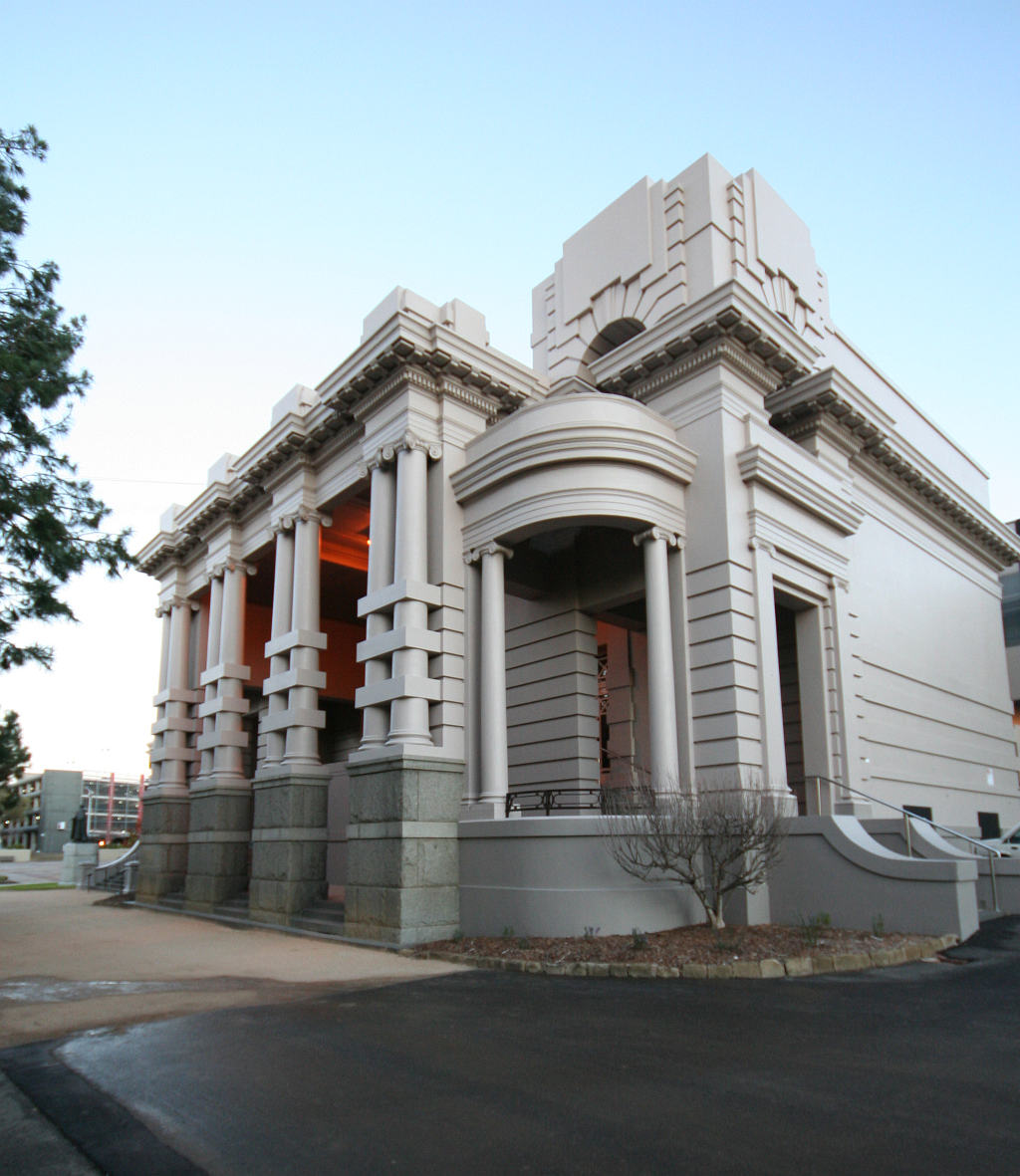
War memorial

Sunken garden

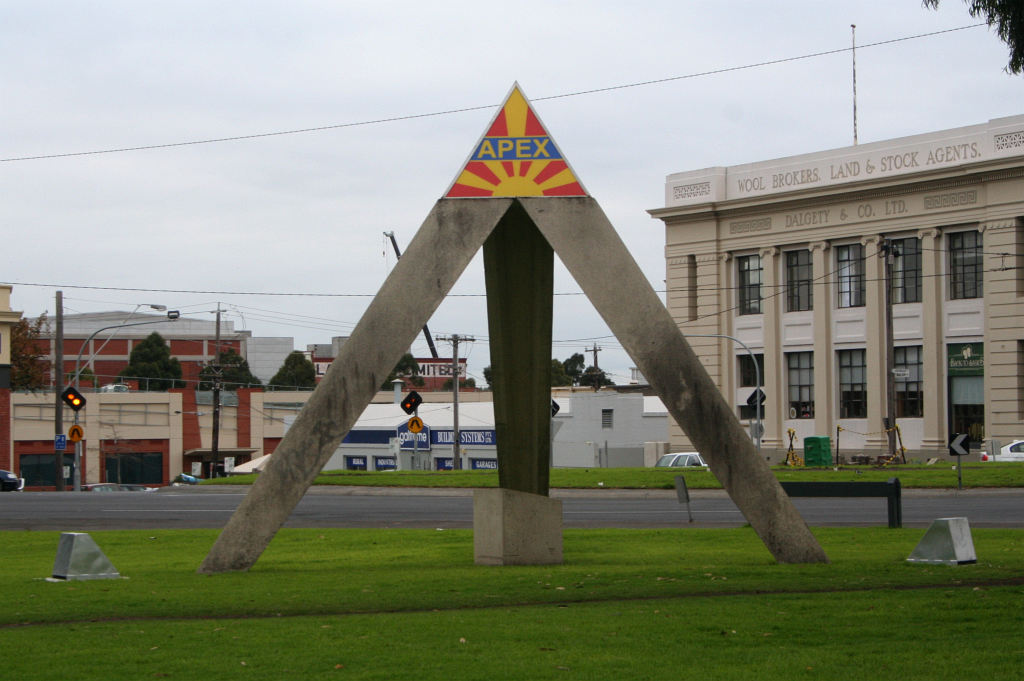
Sculpture marking the formation of Apex Clubs of Australia in Geelong in 1931
