= Geelong Gallery =

Coordinates: 38°08′50.42″S 144°21′26.60″E

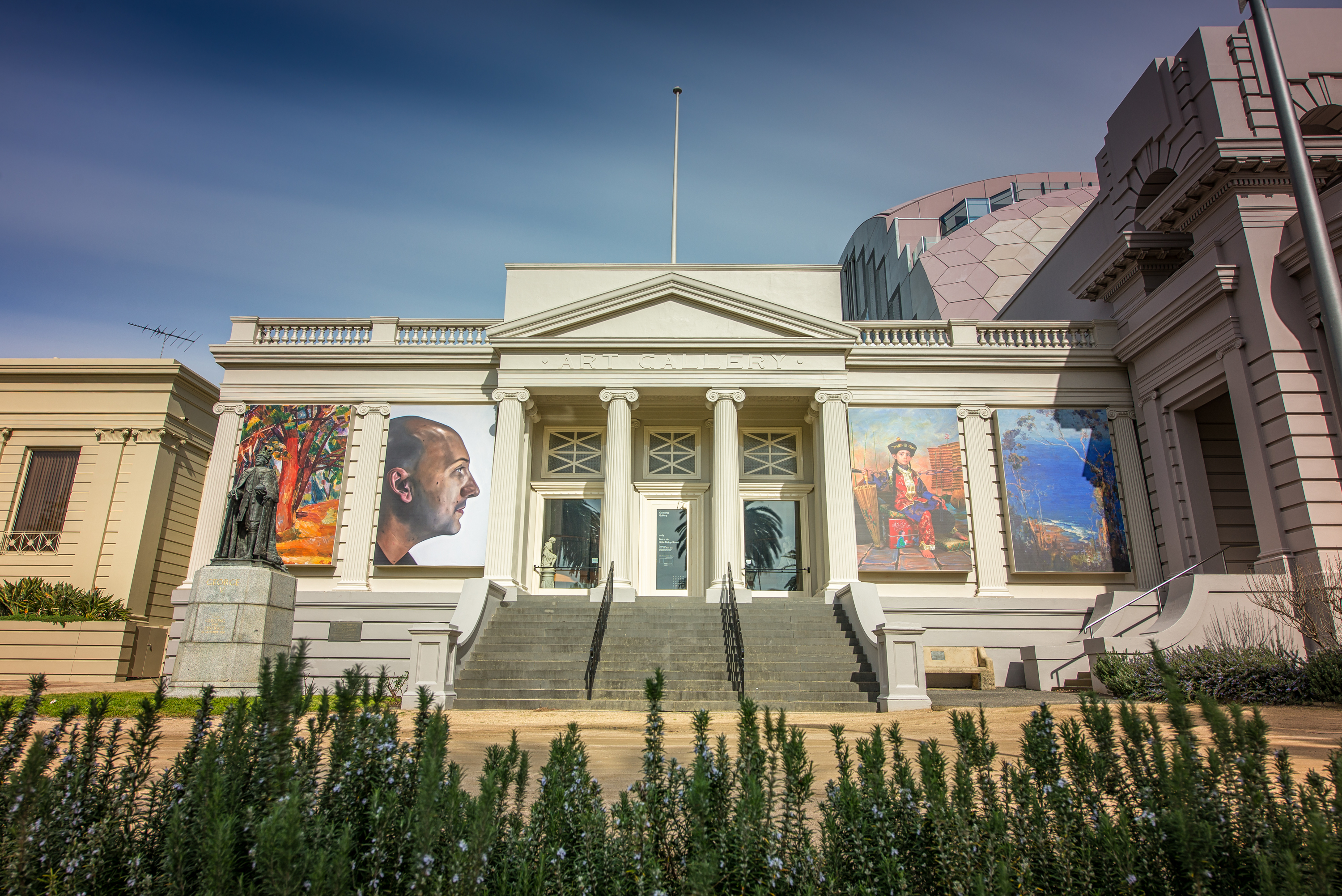
- Geelong Gallery from Johnstone Park
- Former name: Geelong Art Gallery
- Established: 1895
- Location: 55 Little Malop St, Geelong, Australia
- Type: Art gallery
- Director: Humphrey Clegg
- Website: www.geelonggallery.org.au

Geelong Gallery, formerly known as Geelong Art Gallery, is a major regional gallery in the city of Geelong in Victoria, Australia. The Gallery forms Geelong's Cultural Precinct, along with the adjacent Geelong Library and Heritage Centre (Geelong Regional Library and Geelong Heritage Centre), Geelong Arts Centre, and the Geelong Courthouse (housing Back to Back Theatre and Platform Arts).

== History ==
An art gallery for Geelong was first petitioned for in 1895 by members of the Geelong Progress League. In May 1900 permission was given for the Geelong Art Gallery Association to use three walls in the Geelong City Hall to hang artwork on. Among the first acquisitions made was Frederick McCubbin's 1890 A bush burial which cost 100 guineas ($210 USD) at the time. On 31 May 1900, the formal opening of the Geelong Art Gallery took place at the town hall. Mr. S. Austin, M.L.C., presided and the mayor Alderman Carr made a speech officially declaring it open to the public.

The Gallery was soon moved to the Free Library Building in Moorabool Street (between Malop and Corio Streets).

For over 125 years Geelong Gallery has amassed a significant collection of Australian and European painting, sculpture, printmaking and decorative arts. This includes works made by renowned artists such as Eugène von Guérard, Clarice Beckett, Emily Kame Kngwarreye, and Frederick McCubbin.

In 2021, Geelong Gallery presented the first comprehensive survey of Rone’s career to date, charting the artist’s practice from early stencil works and street art, to photographs documenting major installations that have transformed abandoned spaces.

== Building ==
The current Geelong Gallery was officially opened in 1915, and was erected as a memorial to the late George M. Hitchcock.

is located on the south side of Johnstone Park, between the Town Hall and the former fire station site, now occupied by the Geelong Library and Heritage Centre. The initial building consisted of a portico and vestibule facing the park, and the G. M. Hitchcock Gallery.

The first additions to the Gallery occurred in 1928 when the Henry P. Douglas Gallery was opened, followed by the H.F. Richardson Gallery in 1937. The main entrance to the gallery was moved to Little Malop Street with the opening of the J.H. McPhillimy Gallery by then-Prime Minister Joseph Lyons in 1938.

Further expansion followed in 1956 and 1971, with contemporary renovations taking place in 2001 and 2017.

== Governance ==
Jason Smith was previous director of the gallery from 2016 until early 2025, when he took up directorship of the Art Gallery of South Australia in Adelaide.

Humphrey Clegg was appointed director from April 2025.

== Collection ==
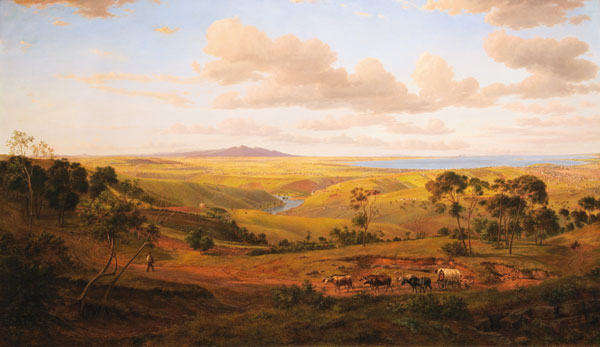
Eugène von Guérard, View of Geelong, 1856

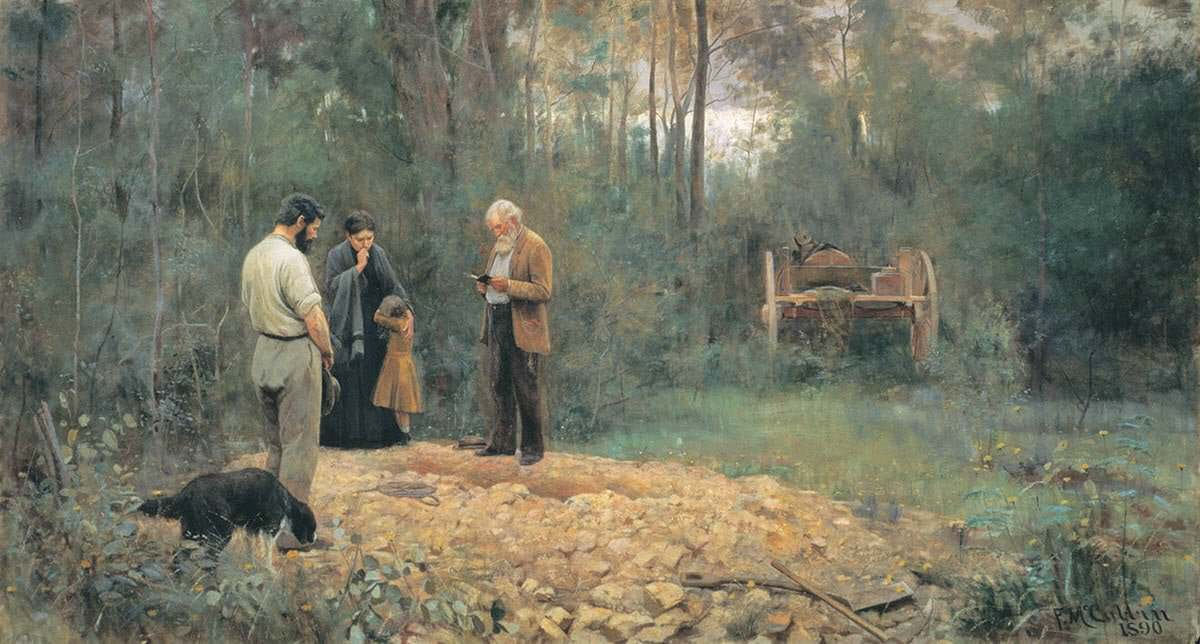
Frederick McCubbin, A bush burial, 1890

The gallery has a collection of over 6,000 Australian and international items, including works on paper, paintings, decorative arts and sculpture. Individual collection items can be viewed on the gallery collection website.

Since 2016 the Gallery has been the custodian of the Colin Holden Print Collection on behalf of the Colin Holden Charitable Trust.

There are a number of notable artworks in the collection, including:

- Eugène von Guérard Aborigines met on the road to the diggings (1854)
- Eugene von Guerard View of Geelong (1856)
- Louis Buvelot On the Woods Point Road (1872)
- Frederick McCubbin A bush burial (1890)
- Edward Fischer Geelong gold cup (1890)
- Stanhope Forbes The pier head (1910), considered "one of the greatest British impressionist paintings in Australia"
- Russell Drysdale Hill End (1948)
- Fred Williams Yellow landscape (1968)
- Rosalie Gascoigne Sharpe Bros horizontal (1981)
