= Gordon Institute of TAFE =

Vocational education institution in Melbourne, Australia

Coordinates: 38.14649°S 144.35526°E

The Gordon Institute
- The Gordon Institute logo
- Type: TAFE Institute
- Established: 1887
- Administrative staff: 800 plus
- Students: 23,000
- Location: Geelong, Victoria, Australia
- Website: https://www.thegordon.edu.au

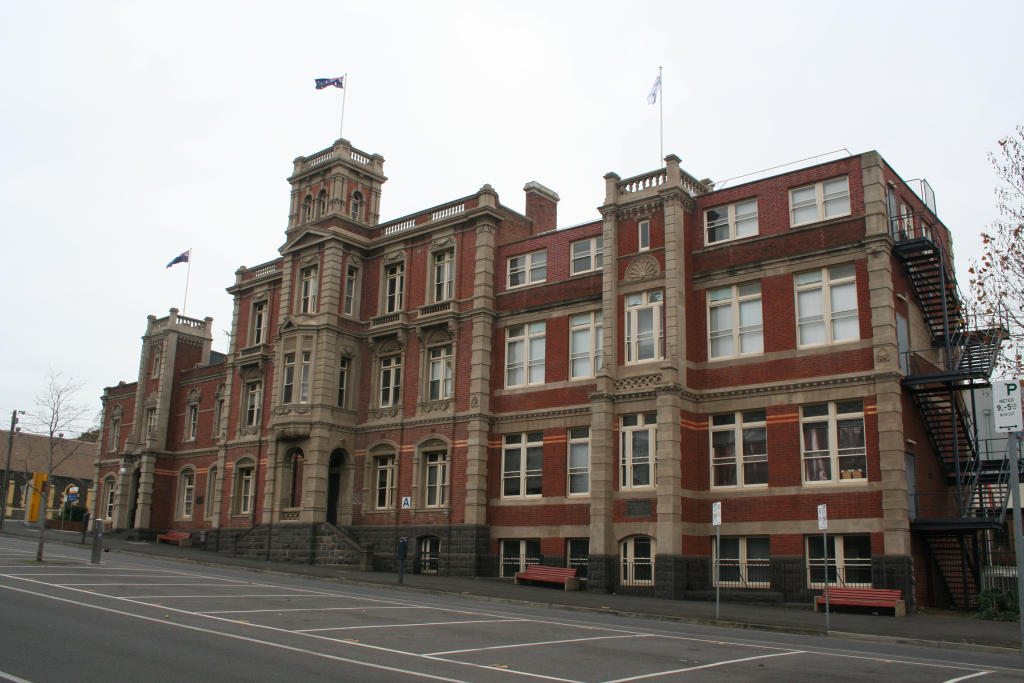
Geelong City Campus

The Gordon Institute of TAFE is the Technical and Further Education institute predominantly servicing the wider Geelong area in Victoria, Australia. The Gordon opened in 1887 and celebrated 130 years of providing education in 2017.

The Gordon provides education to more than 13,500 students annually and, with more than 500 staff members, it is one of the largest employers in Geelong. The Gordon offers over 350 courses across several campuses located in Geelong City, East Geelong, Werribee and Hoppers Crossing. Sixty percent (60%) of The Gordon students live in the wider Geelong region.

== History ==
The Gordon Institute of TAFE was opened in 1888 as the Gordon Memorial Technical College.

The college had its beginnings in 1885, when 500 people met at the Geelong City Hall to decide upon a memorial to General Charles George Gordon, who died at Khartoum in January 1885. William Humble (owner of the Vulcan Foundry) and George Link (Matthew Flinders school headmaster) decided that a school of art be erected in his honour.

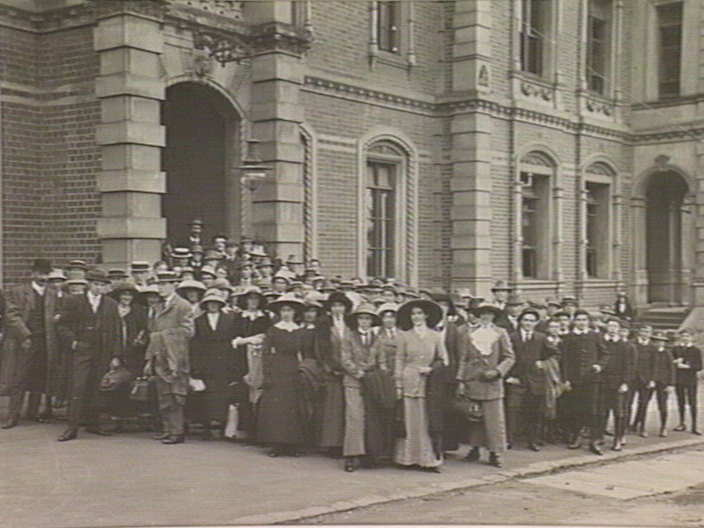
Opening of the Gordon Technical College, 1910

The foundation stone for the first building, Davidson Hall, was laid in July 1887. The land selected for the school was originally part of Johnstone Park, Geelong. 16 January 1888 saw the first term commence at the Gordon Memorial Technical College. There were 63 students enrolled, in subjects ranging from mechanical drawing, to architecture, and languages.

In 1890, the two-storey trade engineering and chemistry buildings opened on Fenwick Street. April 1891 saw the three-storey administration building open next door. Behind this building a time capsule was laid. Opened in 1987, it contained copies of Geelong and Melbourne newspapers of the time, as well as reports from the Geelong City Council. The northern Fenwick Street building was added in 1916, and the Hitchcock art studio in 1910.

In November 1921, the college changed its name to the Gordon Institute of Technology. It was also at this time that the institute's Lascelles chemistry laboratory opened on Gordon Avenue, followed by the Bostock lecture hall next door in 1928.

In 1927 the first buildings at the Moorabool Street campus were built and, in 1941, the trade workshops were the first college buildings erected on the Latrobe Terrace side of the railway line. The 1960s saw the first of the modern multi-storey buildings built on the site.

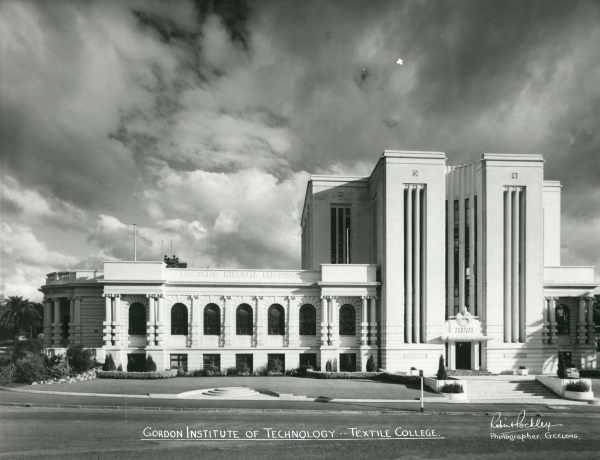
Gordon Institute of TAFE, circa 1940-1955

In 1969, the Gordon expanded again, with land being purchased on the outskirts of Geelong at Waurn Ponds. A building for the applied sciences was first built, followed in 1975 by a library and student lodgings.

On 1 April 1976, Deakin University was established by merging the Gordon Institute of Technology's higher education courses and Waurn Ponds site with the State College of Victoria at Geelong, previously Geelong Teachers' College which had opened in 1950.

The Moorabool Street campus (formerly the Geelong Technical School) and the vocational courses now became Gordon Technical College. At that time, that campus was expanded, and the East Geelong campus opened.
