= Light Railway Research Society of Australia =

Australian light railway and tramway research society

Light Railways magazine and about 60 books provide the main outlets for the Society's research efforts. Back issues of the magazine are downloadable free from the Society's website.

The Light Railway Research Society of Australia (LRRSA) is an amateur research society that focuses on narrow gauge railways, tramways, and industrial railways in Australia and places where Australian economic interests were strong, such as Papua New Guinea, Fiji, and the phosphate islands of the Pacific.

The society originated in 1961 in Victoria; it subsequently established branches in Adelaide, Brisbane, Melbourne and Sydney. It aims to promote interest in special-purpose railways associated with a wide range of industries, including sugar production, timber milling, tourism, construction, manufacturing, quarrying and mining. Members' interests include industrial archaeology, social history, preservation, mapping, bush walking and photography.

The society has been credited with some of the most thorough research and publication about light railways in Australia and worldwide. In the society's early days, members focused particularly on the industrial archaeology of timber tramways before extending to many other aspects of the sawmilling industry and to other industries that used light railways. Their early regional studies of the industrial archaeology of timber tramways, usually based on detailed field research, were significant since studies of the industrial history of Australian forests were otherwise largely non-existent. It has consequently become a leading publisher of books on sawmilling history with a range of more than 60 books.

The society publishes a magazine, Light Railways, six times per year. PDF downloads of back issues are available free of charge.

== See also ==
- History of rail transport in Australia
