= Australian Forest History Society =

Environmental organization in Australia

- Formation: 1988
- Type: History Society
- Location: PO Box 5128 Kingston ACT 2604 AUSTRALIA, Australia
- Members: 90
- President: Sue Feary (NSW)
- Treasurer: Fintán Ó Laighin (ACT)
- Secretary: Kevin Frawley (ACT)
- Website: Australian Forest Historical Society

The Australian Forest History Society is a network of people interested in the history of Australia's forests and woodlands. It was formed in 1988 and was formally incorporated in the Australian Capital Territory (ACT) on 27 May 1998. The Society membership stood at about 90 in 2014. It produces a newsletter three times a year and a national conference every 3–4 years. For example, the 2015 conference focused on social and environmental history of planted forests, and the role of Australian species planted overseas.

The Society is in contact with other international forestry organizations such as the Forest History Unit of the International Union of Forest Research Organizations (IUFRO) and is a member of the International Consortium of Environmental History Organizations (ICEHO).

ACT forester John Dargavel was instrumental in establishing the organization after a number of papers presenters at a conference in Canberra in May 1988, resolved that "...an Australian Forest History Society should be established, with the aim to advance historical understanding of human interaction with Australian forest and woodland".
