= Geelong Town Hall =

Civic building in Victoria, Australia

Coordinates: 38.1472°S 144.3575°E

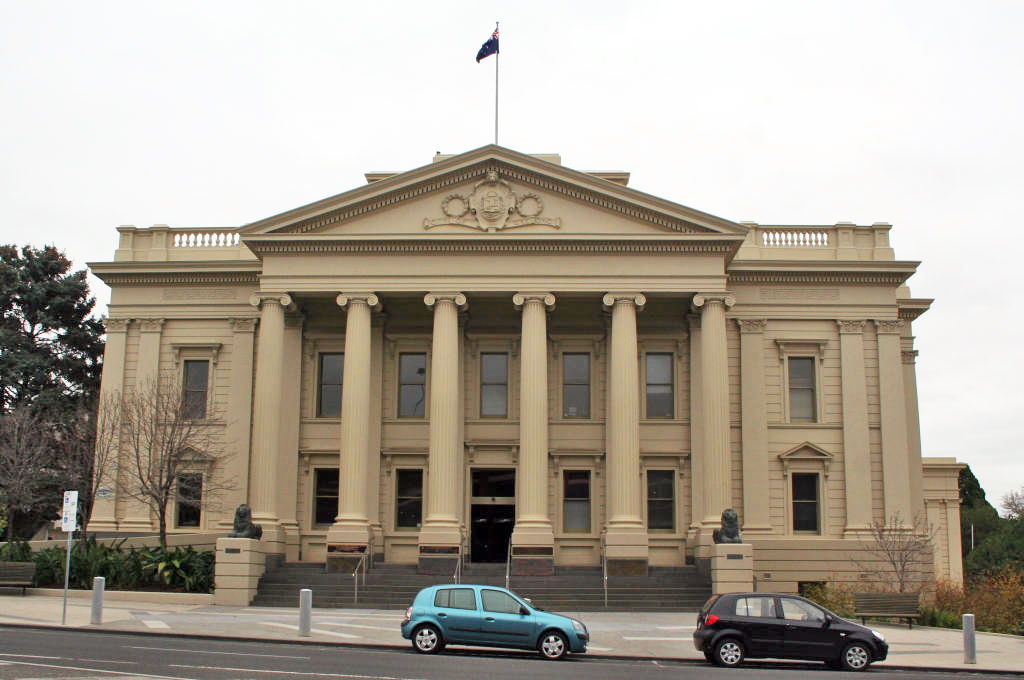
Geelong City Hall

Geelong City Hall is a civic building located on Gheringhap Street in central Geelong, Victoria. It was originally built for the City of Geelong, which became the City of Greater Geelong in 1993.

== Construction ==
The land for the City Hall was first acquired by the council in 1854. Two acres (0.8 hectares) in size, it was on the corner of Little Malop and Gheringhap Streets. A design competition was held, with 12 entries being received. The winning entry was submitted by a Melbourne architect, Joseph Reed.

The cost was estimated at 34,533 pounds ($69,066), it was decided to only build a single southern wing along Little Malop Street. The foundation stone was laid on 9 April 1855 by the then-Mayor Dr William Baylie. The wing was completed soon after.

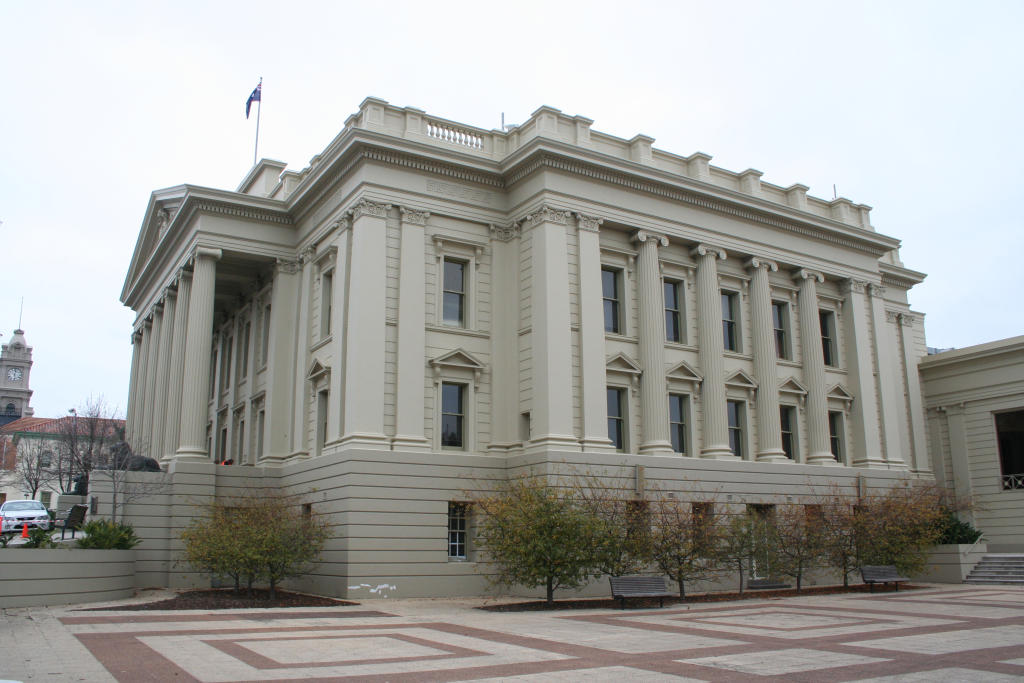
View from Johnstone Park

== Expansion ==
The single southern wing remained alone until the early 1900s. Suggestions were made to move the Town Hall to another site, with a referendum being held in 1914 proposing the council move to the former Geelong Grammar building on Moorabool Street. This proposal was defeated, with the original design being completed, opening in June 1917. It remains today, with minor additions at the rear.
