= Terrace Falls =

Waterfall in Victoria, Australia

- Location within Victoria
- Location: Pennyroyal, Victoria, Australia
- Coordinates: 38°27′40″S 143°53′33″E
- Type: Plunge
- Total height: 10.45 m (34.3 ft)
- Number of drops: 1
- Watercourse: Tributary of Acquila Creek

Terrace Falls is a waterfall on a tributary of Acquila Creek in the Otway Ranges, Victoria, Australia. The waterfall consists of a single drop with a height of approximately 10.45 metres.

== Description ==
Terrace Falls is named for the distinctive terraced appearance of the rock formation over which the water descends. The stepped nature of the waterfall creates a series of ledges.

The falls are best viewed following periods of significant rainfall, when increased water flow accentuates the multiple terraces and creates the most visually impressive conditions for visitors and photographers.

== Access ==
Terrace Falls, as well as the nearby waterfalls known as Pennyroyal Falls, Dunse Falls, Arletts Falls, Paradox Falls and Acquila Falls, can be reached along an informal walking track that begins at the nearby Dunse Track. The walk involves a couple of creek crossings.

== See also ==
- Paradox Falls
- Pennyroyal Falls
- Dunse Falls
- Acquila Falls
