= Horseshoe Falls (Victoria) =

Waterfall in Victoria, Australia

- Horseshoe Falls, photographed around 1890–1910

- Location within Victoria
- Location: Benwerrin, Victoria, Australia
- Coordinates: 38°28′17″S 143°58′29″E
- Type: Plunge
- Total height: 17.60 m (57.7 ft)
- Number of drops: 1
- Watercourse: Reedy Creek

Horseshoe Falls (also historically known as Louise Falls) is a waterfall located in the Otway Ranges, within the locality of Benwerrin, Victoria, Australia. The waterfall consists of a single drop, at a height of 17.60 metres (57.7 ft).

== History and description ==
The waterfall is named after the shape of the surrounding rock, which resembles a horseshoe. The waterfall was initially discovered in the 1880s, and was referred to as "Cambrian Falls". However, owing to the difficulty of reaching the waterfall, the location was forgotten for some time.

It was rediscovered in the 1920s as the Great Ocean Road was taking shape, and it was decided to name the waterfall 'Louise Falls' in honour of Howard Hitchcock's (who largely funded the Great Ocean Road) wife Louise.

== Access ==
The waterfall can be reached via an unmaintained, unofficial walking track that leads into the bush alongside Big Hill Track, which is denoted by pink ribbons left on the tree.

== See also ==
- Paradox Falls
- Pennyroyal Falls
- Dunse Falls
- Acquila Falls
