= Wymbooliel Falls =

Waterfall in Victoria, Australia

- Location within Victoria
- Location: Benwerrin, Victoria, Australia
- Coordinates: 38°28′33″S 143°54′10″E
- Type: Plunge
- Total height: 19.86 m (65.2 ft)
- Number of drops: 2
- Watercourse: Acquila Creek

Wymbooliel Falls is waterfall located in the Otway Ranges, within the locality of Benwerrin, Victoria, Australia. The waterfall lies on Acquila Creek, and comprises 2 tiers, measuring 12.44 metres (40.8 ft) and 7.42 metres (24.3 ft) respectively, at a total height of 19.86 metres (65.2 ft).

== Description ==
The waterfall is named after the nearby locality of Wymbooliel. The waterfall has a smaller water catchment, and requires significant rainfall to flow.

== See also ==
- Paradox Falls
- Pennyroyal Falls
- Dunse Falls
- Acquila Falls
