= Arletts Falls =

Waterfall in Victoria, Australia

- Location within Victoria
- Location: Pennyroyal, Victoria, Australia
- Coordinates: 38°27′40″S 143°53′33″E
- Type: Plunge
- Total height: 5.89 m (19.3 ft)
- Number of drops: 2
- Watercourse: Tributary of Acquila Creek

Arletts Falls is a waterfall on a tributary of Aquila Creek in the Otway Ranges, Victoria, Australia. The waterfall consists of two tiers measuring approximately 3.13 metres and 2.76 metres, giving it a total height of about 5.89 metres.

== History ==
Arletts Falls takes its name from the former railway locality of Arlett's Corner, which was established along the Birregurra-Forrest railway line. The railway line opened on 5 June 1891 and included a station named Arlett's Corner. The station was renamed Pennyroyal in September that year.

== See also ==
- Pennyroyal Falls
- Dunse Falls
- Paradox Falls
- Acquila Falls
