= Bruce Anderson =

Bruce Anderson may refer to:

- Bruce Anderson (American football) (born 1944), American football linebacker
- Bruce Anderson (columnist) (born 1949), British conservative political columnist
- Bruce Anderson (footballer, born 1895) (1895–1957), Australian rules footballer for Geelong
- Bruce Anderson (footballer, born 1907) (1907–1965), Australian rules footballer for Essendon
- Bruce Anderson (footballer, born 1998), Scottish footballer for Kilmarnock FC
- Bruce Anderson (politician) (1950–2025), American politician, member of the Minnesota House of Representatives and the Minnesota Senate
- Bruce Anderson (publisher), American publisher and editor of Anderson Valley Advertiser newspaper
- Bruce Anderson (soldier) (1845–1922), American Civil War soldier and Medal of Honor recipient
- Bruce Anderson (born Charles Bruce Anderson), American child purported to be Bobby Dunbar, who disappeared in Louisiana in 1912
- Bruce W. Anderson (born 1948), American politician, educator, journalist and member of the Minnesota House of Representatives
