= Gherang =

- Town
- Coordinates: 38°18′13″S 144°05′26″E
- Country: Australia
- State: Victoria
- LGA: Surf Coast Shire
- Location: 89 km (55 mi) from Melbourne; 29 km (18 mi) from Geelong; 45 km (28 mi) from Colac; 13.6 km (8.5 mi) from Moriac

Government
  - State electorate: Polwarth
  - Federal division: Wannon
- Elevation: 144 m (472 ft)

Population
  - Total: 391 (SAL 2021)
- Time zone: AEST
- Postcode: 3240
- County: Australia
Localities around Gherang
Wurdiboluc	Modewarre	Modewarre
Wurdiboluc	Gherang	Paraparap
Wensleydale	Wensleydale; Anglesea	Anglesea

Gherang is a locality in Surf Coast Shire, Victoria, Australia. It is located on the northern edge of the Great Otway National Park and the Anglesea Heath. At the 2006 census, Gherang had a population of 370. The area is mostly farmland, although there has been some rural-residential subdivision. Quarries in the area produce good quality gravel which is mostly used for roads.

== History ==
Before British colonisation, the area had been home to the Gadubanud Aboriginal people for thousands of years. Settlement by Europeans began in the mid-19th century and, as a consequence, the number of Gadubanud people rapidly declined.

The area was heavily forested and gravel suitable for roads was discovered. The Wensleydale railway line was completed in 1890, connecting the area to the Port Fairy railway line near Moriac, with the intention of inducing development along the route and transporting timber and firewood. A small station served Gherang but saw very little traffic.

However, in 1921, a rail siding about 700 metres south of the station was provided for the Gherang Gravel Conference, a grouping of three municipalities in the Geelong area, which was quarrying a large gravel deposit adjacent to the line. Considerable quantities of gravel were railed out until the operation ceased in 1939. Just over a kilometre south of the station, another rail siding was provided in 1926 for a privately owned gravel-quarrying operation, which functioned intermittently until 1941.

During World War II, a small army base was established a few hundred metres east of the station, and materials and troops were brought in and out by train. The Gherang Military Post Office was open from 13 January 1942 until 22 September 1942, and from 15 February 1943 until 13 April 1943. Gherang has never had a civilian post office. After the war, the line fell back into disuse and was permanently closed in 1948.

== Wildlife ==
Larger wildlife inhabiting Gherang include kangaroos, echidnas, koalas and the brushtail possum. Bird life in the area includes kookaburras, magpies, little ravens, willie wagtails, pigeons, quail, and a variety of parrot species. Reptiles include the brown snake, blue-tongued lizard and smaller skinks. There are pest species such as rabbits, foxes and feral cats.

== Geothermal Power ==
In 2007, Greenearth Energy announced a plan to build several geothermal power plants in the Gherang area to harness heat from granite which is 4 km below ground. Construction of a trial plant was planned to commence in the early 2010s but did not go ahead.

== Australian Automotive Research Centre ==
South of Gherang is the Australian Automotive Research Centre, the largest privately owned and independently operated automotive testing facility in Australia. Occupying a 1000 hectare site, it includes a 4.2 km highway circuit, vehicle handling tracks, brake test surfaces, and four wheel drive test tracks.
