= Christ Church, Birregurra =

Anglican church in Birregurra, Victoria, Australia

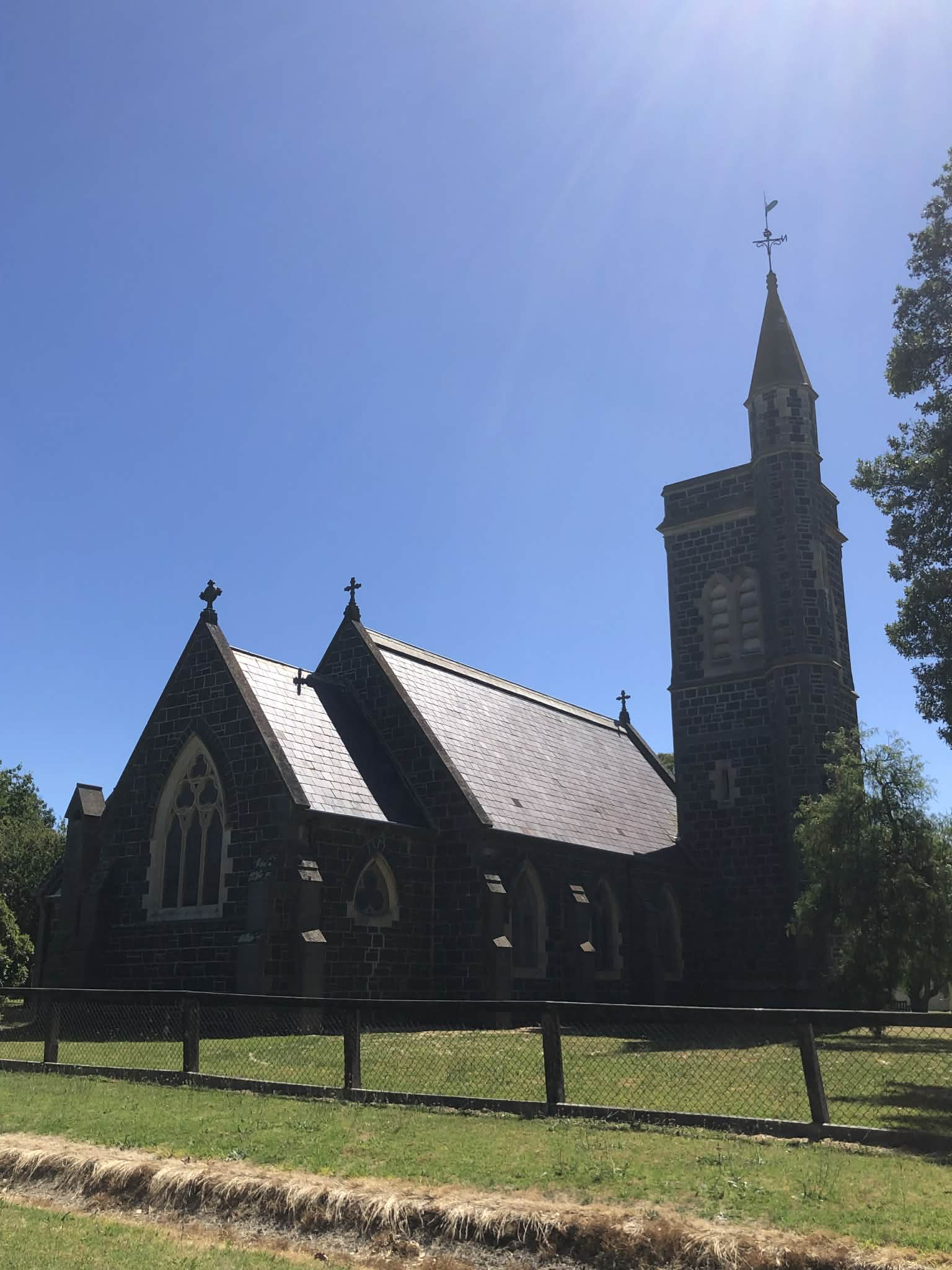
- Christ Church, Birregurra
- Christ Church, Birregurra
- 38°20′31″S 143°47′14″E
- Location: 7 Sladen Street Birregurra, Victoria
- Country: Australia
- Denomination: Anglican Church of Australia
- Website: https://www.anglicancolac.org/

History
- Status: Active
- Dedication: Christ

Architecture
- Architect: Leonard Terry
- Style: Gothic Revival
- Years built: 1870–1871 (later additions)
- Completed: 1871

Administration
- Province: Victoria
- Diocese: Ballarat

Christ Church is a historic Anglican church located in Birregurra, Victoria, Australia. Completed in 1871, the church is notable for its heritage-listed stained glass window, and its 17 metre high tower that can be seen across the town and surrounding area. It continues to see active services, as part of the Parish of Colac, within the Anglican Diocese of Ballarat.

== History ==
In 1866, land was set apart for Church of England purposes, and in 1867, John Davenport Bromfield, a prominent local pastoralist who resided in the nearby Elliminook Homestead, was appointed as one of the trustees for this allotment.

On 6 April 1870, John Davenport Bromfield laid the foundation stone for the church. A mere month and a half later, he died as a result of an aneurysm. His widow, Mrs. Eliza Bromfield, commissioned Ferguson and Urie to create a chancel window in his memory.

The church was opened seven months later on 5 February 1871, with the incumbent being Rev. Thomas Sabine. The church was constructed of bluestone from the nearby Mount Gellibrand and freestone from Waurn Ponds. It was designed by Melbourne architect Leonard Terry, who was influenced by Gothic architectural styles.

The bell tower and spire were added in 1890, and the bell from the Buntingdale Aboriginal Mission was added to the church, and a cork oak estimated to be over 120 years old grows in the church grounds.

The church also contains a heritage-listed stained glass window by Scottish-Australian stained-glass designer William Frater, commemorating local men who enlisted for WW1. The men honoured are Edgar Henry Abbott, H.T. Crabbe, Harold Hinds De La Rue, Alfred Gammon, William Edward Lambell, Theodore Albert Lewis, Ernest Cecil Parkes, Henry Norman Rothery, Eric Gentle Roy, James Clive Talbot, Albert Ernest Taylor, and Frederick Joseph Wallace.

=== Vicarage ===
The vicarage, now a private residence adjacent to the church, was built in 1866–1867 and was also designed by Leonard Terry. It was built by Paton and Pepper and was the home of Rev. Thomas Sabine.

=== Sunday School ===
The church grounds originally contained a brick building used as a Sunday School, and was built in 1890 by Mrs. Eliza Bromfield, who went on to remarry and became Mrs. Edmundson, in memory of her second husband, William Edmundson. The building later became unsuitable and was subsequently demolished, being replaced by the relocated All Saints' Anglican Church from Mount Gellibrand.

== See also ==
- Ss Johns' Anglican Church, Colac
- St Thomas' Anglican Church, Winchelsea
