= Wensleydale, Victoria =

Wensleydale
- Town
- Coordinates: 38°22′08″S 144°03′11″E
- Country: Australia
- State: Victoria
- LGA: Surf Coast Shire
- Location: 100 km (62 mi) from Melbourne; 36 km (22 mi) from Geelong; 41 km (25 mi) from Colac

Government
  - State electorate: Polwarth
  - Federal division: Wannon
- Elevation: 200 m (660 ft)

Population
  - Total: 95 (SAL 2021)
- Time zone: AEST
- Postcode: 3240
Localities around Wensleydale
Winchelsea South	Wurdiboluc	Gherang
Bambra	Wensleydale	Anglesea
Boonah	Eastern View	Aireys Inlet

Wensleydale is a locality in Surf Coast Shire, Victoria, Australia.

Wordieboluc Post Office opened on 15 March 1866 and was replaced by the Wensleydale office in 1872. It closed in 1955.

Wensleydale was the terminus of a railway line which branched from the Port Fairy line near Moriac. The line opened in 1890 and was used to transport firewood, gravel and brown coal out of the area. It was closed in 1948.

Wensleydale School opened on 1 January 1869 as a common school and became a state school in 1873. The school ceased to be staffed in 1951 and formally closed on 16 December 1953. The buildings were moved to the school at Colac West.
