= Surf Coast Shire =

Coordinates: 38°18′00″S 144°00′00″E

- Local government area
- Location in Victoria

- Interactive map of Surf Coast Shire
- Country: Australia
- State: Victoria
- Region: Barwon South West
- Established: 1994
- Council seat: Torquay

Government
  - Mayor: Cr Mike Bodsworth
  - State electorates: Polwarth; South Barwon
  - Federal divisions: Corangamite; Wannon

Area
  - Total: 1,553 km^{2} (600 sq mi)

Population
  - Total: 37,623 (2021)
  - Density: 24.226/km^{2} (62.745/sq mi)
- Gazetted: 9 March 1994
- Website: Surf Coast Shire
LGAs around Surf Coast Shire
Golden Plains	Golden Plains	Greater Geelong
Colac Otway	Surf Coast Shire	Bass Strait
Colac Otway	Bass Strait	Bass Strait

Aerial views of the Barwon South West region of Victoria, Australia

The Surf Coast Shire is a local government area in the Barwon South West region of Victoria, Australia, located in the south-western part of the state. It covers an area of 1,553 square kilometres (600 mi^{2}). It had a population of 32,251 in June 2018. It includes the coastal towns of Aireys Inlet, Anglesea, Lorne and Torquay and the inland towns of Moriac and Winchelsea.

The Shire is governed and administered by the Surf Coast Shire Council; its seat of local government and administrative centre is located at the council headquarters in Torquay. The Shire is named after its location on the popular surf coast of Victoria.

== History ==
=== Formation ===
Before the 1990s local government reforms, the Surf Coast Shire's area was covered by three municipalities: the Shire of Winchelsea, the Shire of Barrabool, and the City of South Barwon. The Barrabool/South Barwon boundary was the Surf Coast Highway. This meant that Jan Juc and part of Torquay were in Barrabool, while the remainder of the Torquay district, including the traditional town centre, was in South Barwon.

When the City of Greater Geelong was created in May 1993, it initially took in the entire Torquay/Jan Juc area as far west as Ghazeepore Road. It also annexed areas on Geelong's fringe (Ceres, Wandana Heights, Waurn Ponds and Mount Duneed) which had previously belonged to Barrabool.

In March 1994, the Surf Coast Shire was formed from the amalgamation of the Torquay/Jan Juc area from Greater Geelong, the remainder of the Shire of Barrabool, and the Shire of Winchelsea (less the Birregurra and Barwon Downs districts, which were lost to the Shire of Colac). The Surf Coast Shire's modern boundaries were settled six months later when the Lake Murdeduke and Mount Gellibrand area, part of the territory lost to Colac, was brought back into the Shire.

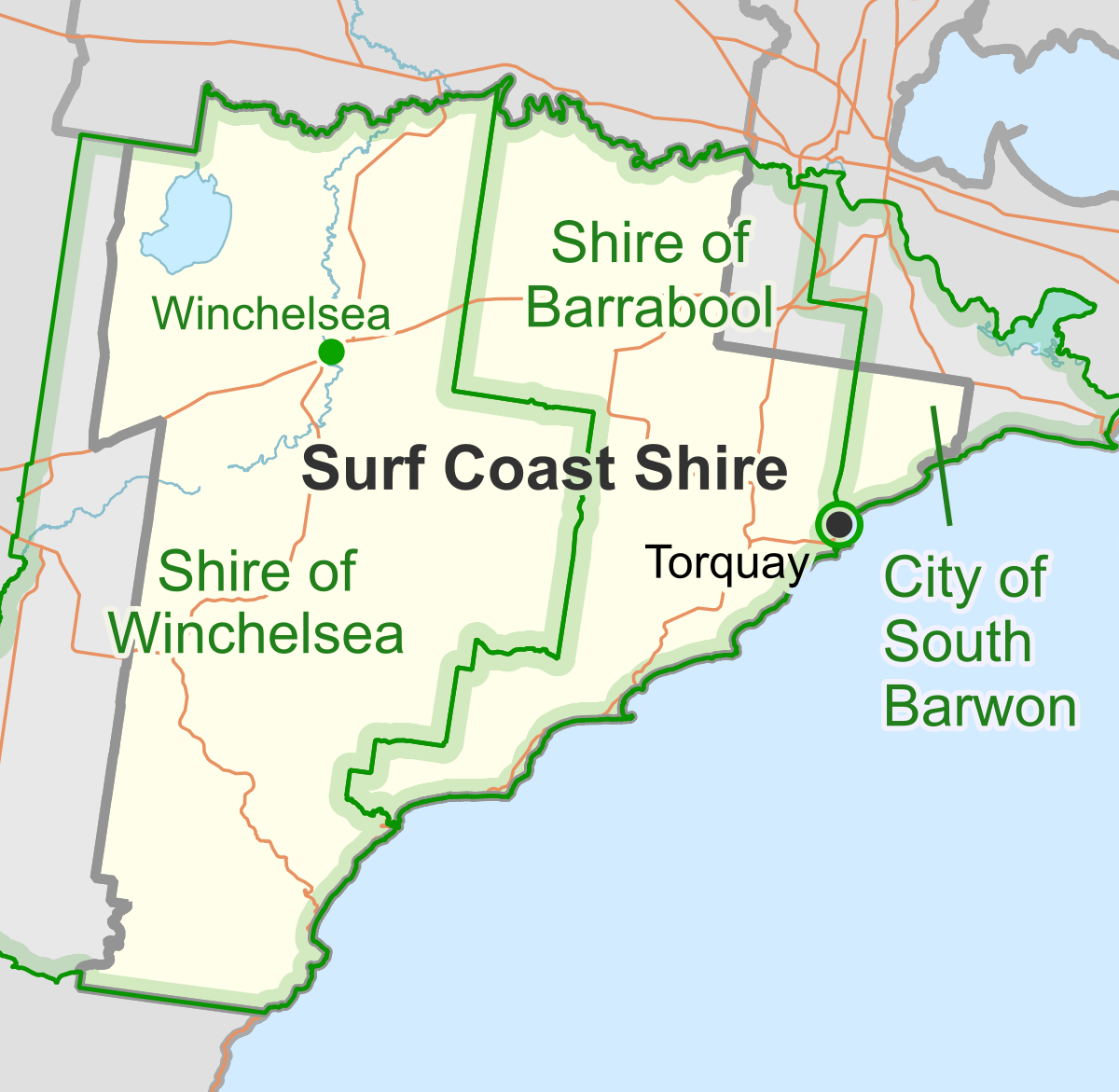
The Surf Coast Shire's predecessor LGAs (green) as at the beginning of 1993. The administrative centres of the former LGAs are marked by green dots.

=== Representation and structure ===
Post-2008, following an electoral representation review, the decision was made to re-subdivide the municipality into four wards, the current wards are Torquay, Anglesea, Winchelsea and Lorne. Between 2004 and 2008, the Shire was an unsubdivided municipality and as a result, the entire municipality voted to elect nine councillors. Between 1996 and 2004, the municipality was subdivided into six wards, where three councillors per ward were elected from the Torquay and Anglesea wards, and one councillor per ward was elected from the Lorne, Winchelsea, Moriac and Aireys Inlet wards. A position of Deputy Mayor was created in 2004, but it was abolished for the 2005 mayoral election.

== Council ==
=== Current composition ===
2024 ward boundaries. Expand the map and click on a ward to see the ward name.

The council is composed of three wards electing three councillors each.

Ward	Councillor	Affiliation	Notes
Otway Range Ward	Mike Bodsworth	Independent	Mayor
Otway Range Ward	Libby Stapleton	Independent	Deputy Mayor
Otway Range Ward	Leon Walker	Independent	
Torquay	Paul Barker	Libertarian	
Torquay	Liz Pattison	Independent	
Torquay	Phoebe Crockett	Greens	
Winchelsea	Joel Grist	Independent Libertarian	
Winchelsea	Tony Phelps	Independent	
Winchelsea	Adrian Schonfelder	Independent Labor	

==== List of former and current mayors ====
- Noel Bates (1995–1997)
- Henry Love (1997–1998)
- Julie Hansen (1998–2000)
- Mike Barrow (2000–2001)
- Beth Davidson (2001–2004)
- Keith Grossman (2004–2005)
- Libby Mears (2005–2006)
- Rose Hodge (2006–2007)
- Dean Webster (2007–2008)
- Libby Mears (2008–2009)
- Libby Coker (2009–2010)
- Dean Webster (2010–2011)
- Brian McKiterick (2011–2012)
- Libby Coker (2012–2013)
- Rose Hodge (2013–2014)
- Margot Smith (2014–2015)
- Rose Hodge (2015–2016)
- Brian McKiterick (2016–2017)
- David Bell (2017–2018)
- Rose Hodge (2018–2020)
- Libby Stapleton (2020–2022)
- Liz Pattison (2022–2024)

=== Administration and Governance ===
The council meets in the council chambers at the council headquarters in the Torquay Municipal Offices, which is also the location of the council's administrative activities. It also provides customer services at its Municipal Office in Torquay.

== Election results ==
=== 2024 ===
2024 Victorian local elections: Surf Coast
Party	Votes	%	Swing	Seats	Change
Independent	12,164	49.67		5	Steady
Back to Basics Team	5,604	22.88	+22.88	3 (Note: Including one endorsed Libertarian Party member and one independent Libertarian member.)	▲3
Greens	4,284	17.49		0	▼1
Independent Labor	2,437	9.95		1	▼1
Formal votes	24,489	97.43			
Informal votes	648	2.57			
Total	25,137	100.0			
Registered voters / turnout	30,125	83.44			

=== 2016 ===
Surf Coast Shire: Anglesea Ward
Party	Candidate	Votes	%	±%
Labor	Libby Coker	2,504	48.50	
Independent	Margot Ann Smith	1,393	27.00	
Independent	Jenna Robinson	1,268	24.6	
Turnout	6,891	76.20%		
Labor hold		Swing		
Independent hold		Swing		

Surf Coast Shire: Torquay Ward
Party	Candidate	Votes	%	±%
Labor	Rose Hodge	2,866	27.20	
Independent	David Bell	1,962	18.60	
Liberal	Brian McKiterick	1,268	16.00	
Greens	Marian Smedley	1,529	14.50	
Independent	Martin Paul Duke	1,522	14.20	
Independent	Joe Remenyi	993	9.40	
Turnout	19,367	68.96%		
Labor hold		Swing		
Independent hold		Swing		
Liberal hold		Swing		
Independent gain from Greens		Swing		

== Townships and localities ==
According to the 2021 census, the shire had a population of 37,694, up from 29,397 in the 2016 census.

Population
Locality	2016	2021
Aireys Inlet	802	979
Anglesea	2,545	3,208
Bambra	101	115
Barrabool	235	247
Bellbrae	865	1,346
Bells Beach	130	151
Benwerrin	5	9
Big Hill	261	281
Birregurra^	828	942
Boonah	21	18
Breamlea^	162	151
Buckley	211	228
Connewarre^	788	953
Deans Marsh	269	368
Eastern View	35	47
Fairhaven	296	390
Freshwater Creek	414	454
Gherang	370	391
Gnarwarre	267	297
Inverleigh^	1,474	1,746
Jan Juc	3,683	4,151
Lorne	1,114	1,327
Modewarre	276	277
Moggs Creek	89	120
Moriac	782	852
Mount Duneed^	1,578	6,182
Mount Moriac	240	251
Ombersley^	97	93
Paraparap	151	167
Pennyroyal^	86	110
Torquay	13,258	18,534
Wensleydale	107	95
Winchelsea^	1,954	2,456
Winchelsea South	179	171
Wurdiboluc	138	147

^ - Territory divided with another LGA

== See also ==
- List of localities (Victoria)
- List of places of worship in Surf Coast Shire
