= Acquila Falls =

Waterfall in Victoria, Australia

- Location within Victoria
- Location: Benwerrin, Victoria, Australia
- Coordinates: 38°27′52.2″S 143°53′45.492″E
- Type: Cascade
- Total height: 7.24 m (23.8 ft)
- Number of drops: 1
- Watercourse: Acquila Creek

Acquila Falls is a waterfall located on the border of the localities of Benwerrin and Pennyroyal, Victoria, Australia, within the Great Otway National Park. The name possibly originates from a corruption of the scientific Latin name for the wedge-tailed eagle (Aquila audax), commonly found surrounding the Otway Ranges. The waterfall has a singular drop, around 7.24 m (23.8 ft) in height.

== See also ==
- Arletts Falls
- Dunse Falls
- Horseshoe Falls
- Pennyroyal Falls
- Paradox Falls
- Wymbooliel Falls
- List of waterfalls
- List of waterfalls in Australia
