= Winchelsea South =

- Coordinates: 38°19′21″S 143°58′59″E
- Country: Australia
- State: Victoria
- LGA: Surf Coast Shire
- Location: 37 km (23 mi) SW of Geelong; 103 km (64 mi) SW of Melbourne

Government
  - State electorate: Polwarth
  - Federal division: Wannon

Population
  - Total: 171 (SAL 2021)
- Postcode: 3241
Localities around Winchelsea South
Winchelsea	Winchelsea	Wurdiboluc
Birregurra	Winchelsea South	Wensleydale
Bambra	Bambra	Wensleydale

Winchelsea South is a locality in the Surf Coast Shire, Victoria, Australia. In the 2016 census, Winchelsea South had a population of 179 people.

Winchelsea South has always been a sparsely populated rural area, with the locality most known for a brown coal mine which operated within its boundaries from 1921 until 1928, and again from 1931 to 1932, and from 1943 to 1957. The mine, alternately known as the Winchelsea South, Bambra or Wensleydale coal mine, was owned respectively by Western District Coal Mines Pty. Ltd, Otway Coal Co. Ltd, Wensley Bray Coal Mine Pty. Ltd. and finally Roche Bros. Pty. Ltd. It sold coal to industrial establishments in Geelong, and supplied the cement works at Fyansford.

In 1923–24, an aerial ropeway was built from the mine to a coal loading bin on the Wensleydale railway line, and it operated until the mine's closure in 1932. The ropeway was damaged in the 1939 Black Friday fires and did not reopen with the mine in 1943. The mine's final owners installed coal loading facilities at Winchelsea railway station instead, and sold the coal further afield within Victoria.

The mine closed in 1957, having produced about three million tons of coal. The opening of a newer mine at Anglesea, which was said to be more easily worked, was given as a major reason for its closure. The Wensleydale mine was flooded thereafter, becoming a lake, which has been used for water sports, and forms one of the main features of the locality today.
