= House at Big Hill =

General information
- Architectural style: Modernist
- Location: Big Hill, Victoria, Australia
- Completed: 2011
- Client: Private

Technical details
- Size: 240sqm

Design and construction
- Architect: Kerstin Thompson
- Architecture firm: Kerstin Thompson Architects
- Structural engineer: SEMF
- Main contractor: KA & JA Wylie Pty Ltd

The House at Big Hill, was completed in 2011, designed by Kerstin Thompson Architects. This project is located at Big Hill, on the Great Ocean Road, near Lorne. It addresses the site and also considered a limited material selection as part of its main design concept.

== Site and location ==
The building is a direct design response towards the surrounding site and situated on a sloping landscape. The two storey house is formed by a right-angled triangle plan aligning with the existing condition of the sloping ground, which acts as a retaining wall as it is semi-recessed into the slanted site. It is orientated in a way that provides an overlook to the Bass Strait and towards the townships of Lorne and Aireys Inlet through eucalyptus with a 180 degree view.

== Form and program ==
House at Big hill is based on a singular form. The design includes "an interest in the use of the platonic form amongst the Victorian moderns." It depicts a single storey unit housing, but in fact the second storey is located below. The program is unrestricted by the triangular geometry. Inside the house, the rooms slide into each other and it creates an unrestricted space within the house. There is a kitchen, a bathroom, one bedroom, and flexible space located on the entrance floor. A living area, two bedrooms and a bathroom ( located between the two bedrooms are on the floor below ). All the bedrooms are facing southwest and overlooks at the panoramic view. The triangular planning both integrates and separates the exterior and interior space.

The longer side of the triangular plan, which is facing the entrance acts as a retaining wall. The right-angled corner defines a significant separation between the inside and out, while at the acute-angled corner integrates the interior and exterior.

== Materials ==
The materials being used for House at Big Hill is reduced to a palette of concrete, glass and timber based on the intention for a coastal retreat to be basic and creating an embedded modesty.

The use of natural grey block work walls in the building is critical to achieve a depth for shadow and an experience of mass, which was desired by the client to have a solid building. It creates the habitable niche and recalls the Griffins’ Castlecrag buildings. Furthermore, the concrete floors and block work walls works as a heat bank in the house, which absorb the heat from the room with their great thermal masses during summer and steam through the windows on winter days.

Timber highlights are used to improve what is naturally a Brutalist palette. The interior of the house is carefully designed based on light and shadow and the use of timber accents offsets the concrete floor and block work walls.

Formply, a medium density overlaid forming structural plywood is suitable for concrete formwork. In the House at Big Hill, the dark coloured Formply ceiling is used to intensify the colours of the adjacent bush and distant sea scapes. It is known to be a durable and strong material. Furthermore, it has a low water transmission rate from a constant water/ cement ratio which results in a harder, denser concrete surface. It is easy to install and maintain and provides a smooth matte-finish that resists grain and patch transfer.

The folded ceiling surface which follows the line of the roof acts as a shelter for the house. Instead of creating a parapet, the roof shifts to two sides and it creates an overhang or eave to the north. With the combination of the dark coloured ceiling and the roof of the house, it visually camouflages itself with the bush landscape. The pocket windows installed on the wall are carved out to provide port holes to isolate and frame the views.

== Awards ==
The house at Big Hill was completed in 2011 and within a short period has won many awards. It includes the 2012 Victorian Australian Institute of Architect "AIA" awards in the category of New Residential and also the winner of Best New House over 200m2 in 2012 House Awards. It also received a commendation in 2012 National AIA Awards in Residential Architecture.
