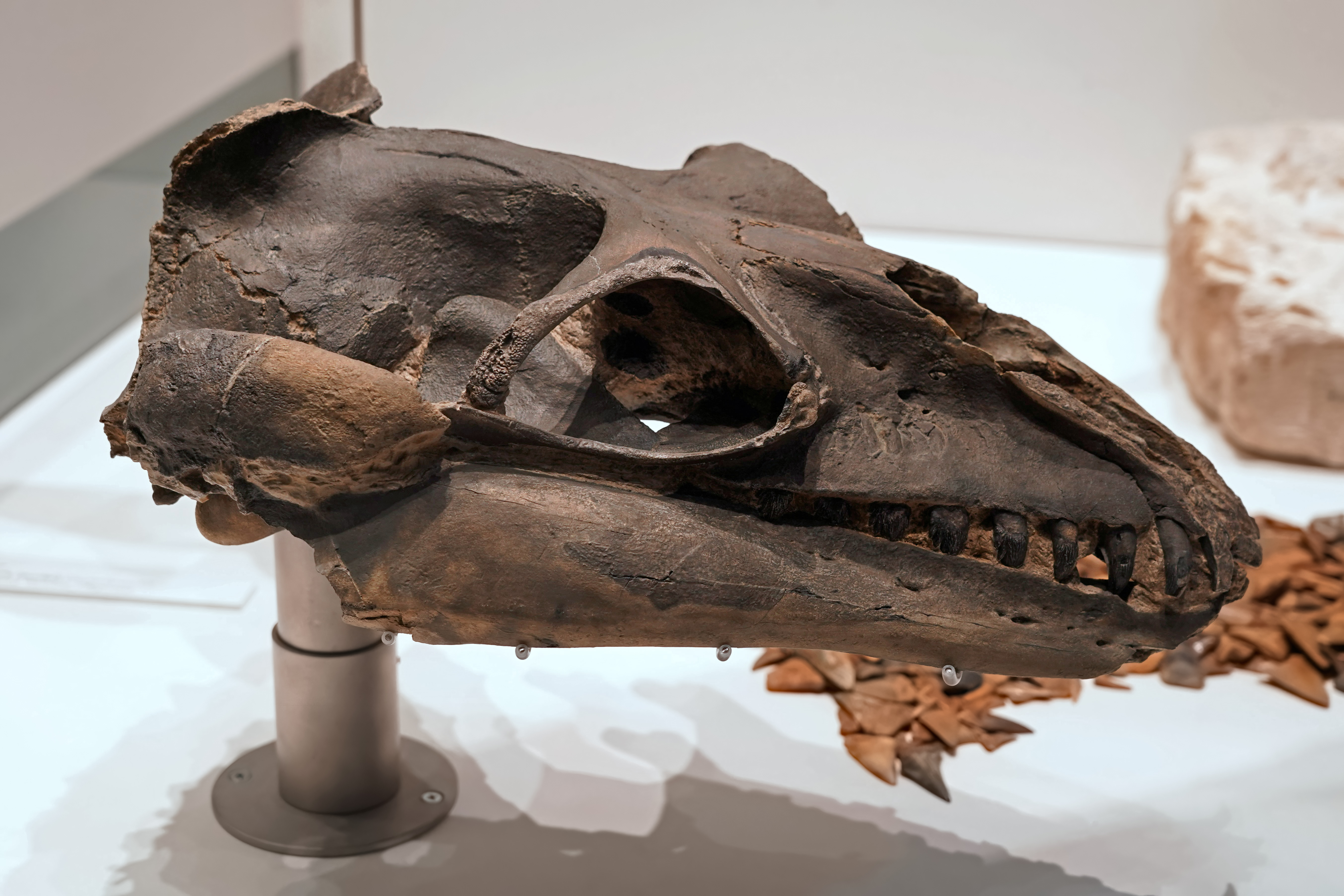
- Skull of Janjucetus hunderi at the Melbourne Museum

Scientific classification
- Kingdom: Animalia
- Phylum: Chordata
- Class: Mammalia
- Infraclass: Placentalia
- Order: Artiodactyla
- Infraorder: Cetacea
- Family: †Mammalodontidae
- Genus: †Janjucetus; Fitzgerald 2006

Type species
- †Janjucetus hunderi Fitzgerald 2006

Other species
- †J. dullardi (Duncan et al., 2025)

= Janjucetus =

Janjucetus Temporal range: Late Oligocene (Chattian), 26.05–24.2 Ma

Extinct genus of whales

Janjucetus is an extinct genus of baleen whale that lived during the Late Oligocene (Chattian) in south-east Australia, around 25 million years ago. Remains of the genus have been found in the Jan Juc Marl in the Jan Juc Formation, near the township of the same name, and have been assigned to two species: the type species J. hunderi and J. dullardi. The locality has yielded remains of more extinct cetaceans, including Prosqualodon, Waipatia, and the related Mammalodon.

Unlike modern mysticetes, it possessed large teeth for gripping and shredding prey, rather than baleen, and was therefore likely to have been a predator that captured individual large prey animals, rather than being a filter feeder. However, it has been noted that the teeth of Junjucetus may have interlocked like those of the modern-day filter-feeding crabeater seal (Lobodon carcinophaga), which would have given it a limited filter-feeding capacity. However, the closest relative to the crabeater seal is the leopard seal (Hydrurga leptonyx), known to have had somewhat similar dentition, although its ecology mostly involves hunting larger prey, leading to the idea that Janjucetus may have fed on large fish. The animal possessed unusually large eyes, suggesting that an acute sense of vision may have aided it in hunting.

== Discovery and naming ==
The holotype of Janjucetus was found in Australia in the late 1990s by a teenaged surfer, Staumn Hunder, near the Victorian township of Jan Juc, in marine sediment that was deposited 26.05–24.2 million years ago (mya) in the Late Oligocene. The genus name Janjucetus honours the township it was found in, and means "Jan Juc whale", deriving from the name of the township and the Latin "cetus", meaning whale. The species name hunderi honours the surfer who discovered the fossil. Hunder is said to have seen the brown fossils on a boulder while he surfed. Soon after discovering the site, Hunder and his father removed the boulder and transported it to Monash University for further research. The well-preserved fossil remains, catalogued as specimen NMV P216929, include a nearly complete skull, mandibles, vertebrae, ribs, scapulae, and a radius, and are held in the Museums Victoria Palaeontology Collection in Melbourne. It was formally described by Erich Fitzgerald in 2006, and it represents the most complete Paleogene cetacean fossil from Australia.

In June 2019, a partial cetacean skull was recovered from the lowest beds of the Jan Juc Marl by Ross Dullard, who prepared the specimen and donated it to Museums Victoria in August of the same year. Catalogued as NMV P256471, it became the type specimen of the new species Janjucetus dullardi, named in honour of Dullard. The elements of the skull were found in close association, including bones of the ear, jaws, and teeth.

== Description ==
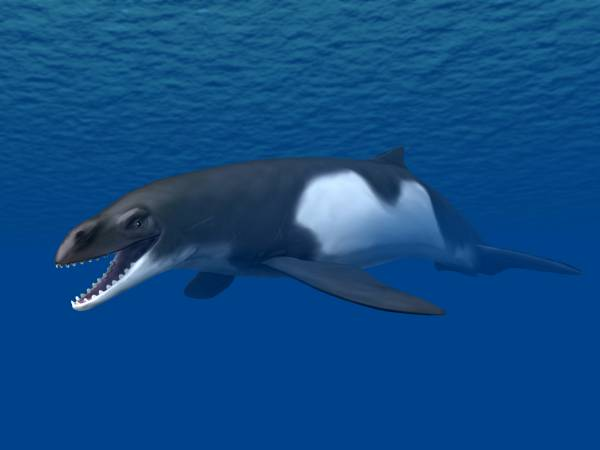
Life reconstruction of J. hunderi

Janjucetus is estimated to have been about 3.5 m (11 ft) in length, about the size of the modern bottlenose dolphin (Tursiops spp.) and much smaller than any living baleen whale. The snout was broad and triangular, and was not flattened or elongated like those of modern baleen whales. The upper jaw (maxilla) made up around 79% of the snout. The two halves of the lower jaw were fused (mandibular symphysis), as opposed to the flexible mandibular symphysis of modern baleen whales, which allows them to significantly increase the size of their mouth. Compared to archaeocetes, primitive whales, the snout is wider, which may have been a precursor to the large mouths of modern baleen whales. Like other baleen whales, Janjucetus did not possess the ability to echolocate; however, it may have had a large line of fat along its lower jaw, similar to modern toothed whales (Odontoceti), which would mean it could detect ultrasonic signals. It had unusually large eyes for a baleen whale compared to its body size, which were positioned high up on the skull; likewise, it probably relied on good eyesight instead of echolocation to navigate.

Janjucetus did not have baleen, and instead had large teeth. The incisors and canines formed a row of conical stabbing teeth, while the premolars and molars were shaped like serrated blades. The teeth were deeply rooted, and the cheek teeth had two roots, perhaps adaptations for handling large prey. The teeth decreased in size towards the back of the mouth. It had sizable temporalis muscles, indicated by their location on the top of the head, meaning it had a strong bite. It had four or six incisor teeth, two canine teeth, eight premolars, and four or six molars in the upper jaw. The teeth had heavily ridged enamel, and the upper teeth were more widely spaced apart than the lower teeth. These teeth perhaps showcase how highly specialised Janjucetus was to its niche, or indicate that it was an evolutionary dead-end given the later proliferation of baleen-bearing baleen whales.

== Classification ==
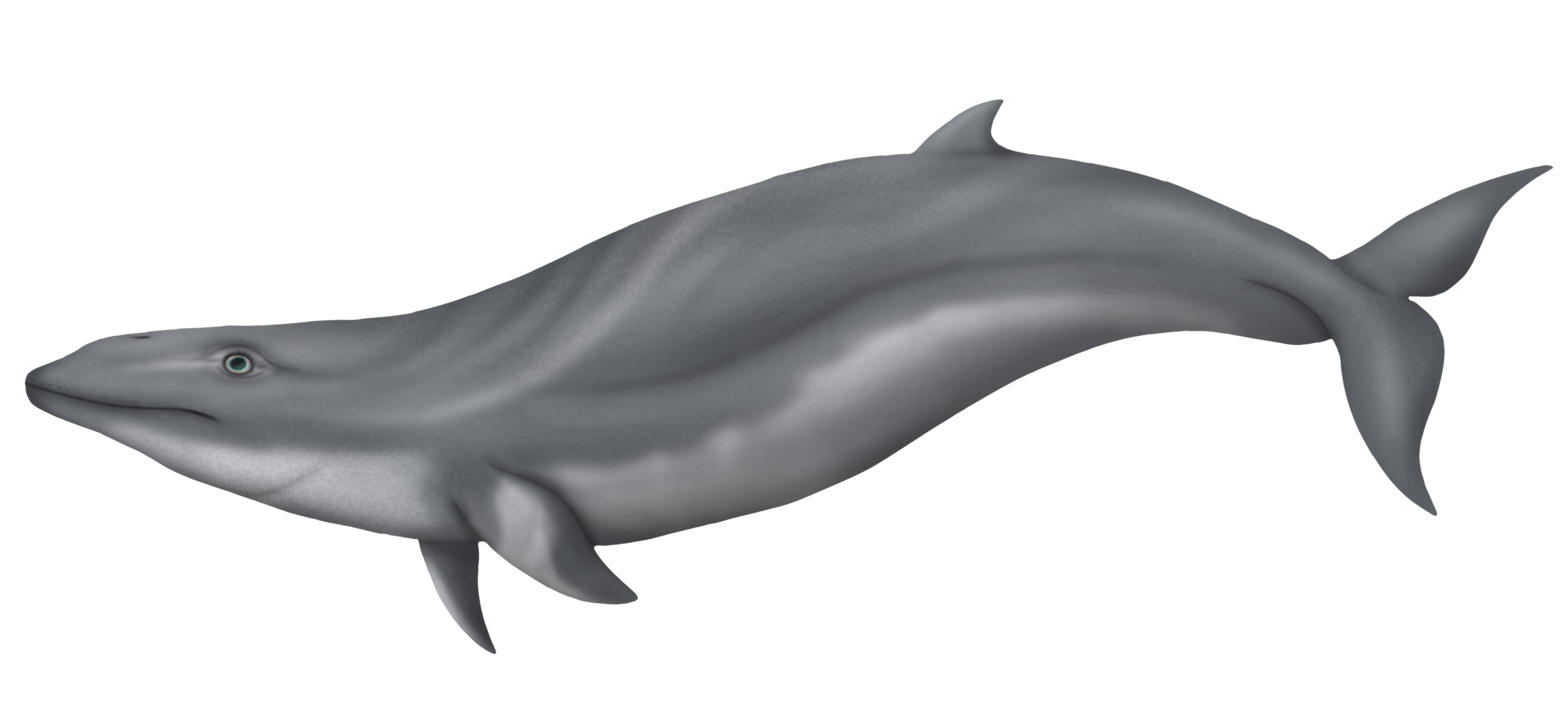
Life reconstruction of J. dullardi

Janjucetus is considered to be a baleen whale (Mysticeti), despite not having baleen, due to key synapomorphies of the skull anatomy, for example, in the way the nasal bones meet the bones of the braincase. Janjucetus is one of two genera, along with the extinct Mammalodon which is also from south-eastern Australia, in the family Mammalodontidae. Janjucetus was initially assigned to its own monotypic family, Janjucetidae, but a subsequent cladistic analysis by Fitzgerald in 2010 reassigned it to the Mammalodontidae, making Janjucetidae a junior synonym. Janjucetus is one of the six toothed baleen whales of the Oligocene, the other being M. colliveri, M. hakataramea, Chonecetus, Aetiocetus and Llanocetus.

A phylogenetic tree showing the position of Janjucetus within Cetacea is reproduced below.

- Cetacea
  - Odontoceti (toothed whales)
  - Mysticeti (baleen whales)
    - Mammalodontidae
      - Janjucetus
      - Mammalodon
    - - Aetiocetidae
      - - Eomysticetidae
        - Modern baleen whales

== Palaeobiology ==
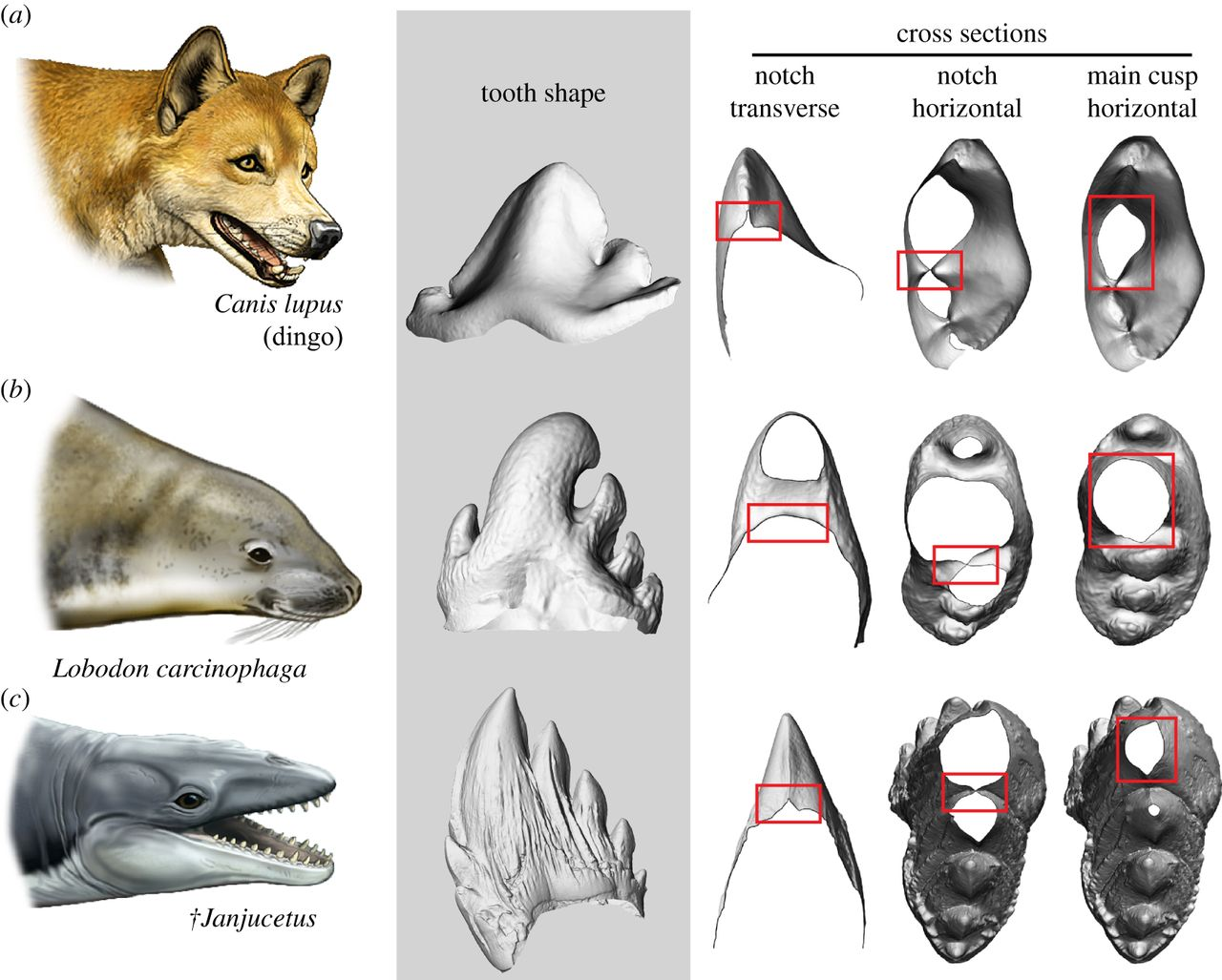
Comparison of teeth of the dingo (Canis lupus dingo), the crabeater seal (Lobodon carcinophaga) and Janjucetus using three-dimensional surface models

Unlike other baleen whales, Janjucetus did not use baleen to filter feed, and instead used teeth to catch large prey such as fish and sharks. Its skull morphology seems to be convergent with the modern-day leopard seal (Hydrurga leptonyx), and so it may have used a similar grip-and-tear feeding method.

However, it is possible that the front teeth interlocked, and the cheek teeth sheared against each other when the mouth was closed, which perhaps allowed the whale to filter feed similar to the modern day crabeater seal (Lobodon carcinophaga). This may have been a precursor to the evolution of baleen and associated feeding habits. The head of Janjucetus is similar to the wide and blunt heads of modern-day, suction-feeding toothed whales, indicating it could suction feed.

== Palaeoecology ==
Jan Juc Beach, where Janjucetus was discovered, also has yielded some fragmentary vertebrate species, such as sharks, rays, and teleost fish. A couple of unidentified bird fossils have been found. Other than Mammalodon, the other cetacean remains found there were those of Prosqualodon and Waipatia.

== See also ==
- Evolution of cetaceans
- Mammalodon
