= Paraparap =

- Suburb
- Coordinates: 38°17′56″S 144°11′02″E
- Country: Australia
- State: Victoria
- LGA: Surf Coast Shire
- Location: 22 km (14 mi) SW of Geelong; 87 km (54 mi) SW of Melbourne

Government
  - State electorate: South Barwon
  - Federal division: Wannon

Population
  - Total: 167 (SAL 2021)
- Postcode: 3240
Suburbs around Paraparap
Modewarre	Moriac	Freshwater Creek
Gherang	Paraparap	Freshwater Creek; Bellbrae
Anglesea	Anglesea	Bellbrae

Paraparap is a locality in the Surf Coast Shire, Victoria, Australia. At the 2016 census, Paraparap had a population of 151 people.

The Paraparap Parish was made available for sale in the 1850s, but was much less successful than other sales in the region, with slightly more than half of the lots being sold in the initial sales. The remaining lots were sold gradually over the subsequent decades, with some not being sold until the early twentieth century. Paraparap was first listed as an address in the 1890-91 directory.

The area had a local progress association, the Paraparap and Pettavel Farmers' Progress Association, from March 1909. The association was responsible for the opening of the Paraparap State School and the Telephone Bureau and Post Office at the Moriac railway station. They later sought to improve roads within the area, and Hunts Road was opened as a result. At the road's opening in 1912, state Minister for Works William Edgar declared that project "the finest example of self-help I have ever seen in Victoria". The association was subsequently involved in the development of Hendy Main Road, which opened in 1920.

Paraparap State School (No. 3634) opened on 12 December 1909 near what is now the junction of Hunts Road and Hendy Main Road. It initially operated part-time, sharing a teacher with nearby Pettavel State School, but operated full-time by 1912. Wynd writes that the school "was the heart of the district" and "served as both meeting hall and church". A tennis court was built opposite the school in 1926. The school closed on 9 November 1951 due to lack of student numbers.

A postal receiving office opened at Paraparap on 16 November 1910. Paraparap Post Office opened on 1 July 1927 and closed on 19 February 1955.

The locality remains largely rural, and now contains the Drol Kar Buddhist Centre, the headquarters of the Geelong Veteran Cycling Club, the Giddings Road Nature Reserve, and a winery.
