= Freshwater Creek, Victoria =

Freshwater Creek
- Town
- Coordinates: 38°16′13″S 144°14′53″E
- Country: Australia
- State: Victoria
- LGA: Surf Coast Shire
- Location: 17 km (11 mi) SW of Geelong; 81 km (50 mi) SW of Melbourne

Government
  - State electorate: South Barwon
  - Federal divisions: Corangamite; Wannon

Population
  - Total: 454 (SAL 2021)
- Postcode: 3216
Localities around Freshwater Creek
Mount Moriac	Mount Duneed	Mount Duneed
Moriac	Freshwater Creek	Mount Duneed
Paraparap	Bellbrae	Torquay

Freshwater Creek is a town in the Surf Coast Shire, Victoria, Australia. In the 2016 census, Freshwater Creek had a population of 414 people.

The town comprises farming and rural properties, with a small township around the intersection of the Anglesea Road and Dickins Road, where there is a service station, a few shops and a cafe. The volunteer Country Fire Authority (CFA) building is in Dickins Road. Alongside is the Community Hall, tennis courts, BBQ, public toilets and playground. The Freshwater Creek Riding Club is next door to the Community Hall, and has a cross-country course along Duneed Creek. Opposite is Red Gum Run Arena Polo. The Revival Centre Church Camp is located behind the service station.

The Freshwater Creek Steiner School is in McIntyres Road. A not-for-profit food recycling and composting organisation, City Harvest, is co-located with "The Farmers Place" on the Anglesea Road.

Freshwater Creek Post Office opened on 21 January 1860, was provisionally closed on 25 January 1961, and fully closed on 25 March 1961.

A Wesleyan denominational school was opened at Freshwater Creek in 1856. After the introduction of state schools in 1883, it became government school No. 256. A new weatherboard school building was opened at the same time, replacing the original bluestone one. The school's honour roll from World War I is now in the Community Hall, and is listed on the Victorian War Heritage Inventory. In 1994, the Freshwater Creek, Connewarre and Mount Duneed primary schools were amalgamated at Mount Duneed. The Freshwater Creek school building was moved to the Waurn Ponds campus of Deakin University, where it formed part of a collection of historic local buildings. It remained there for some years, but was moved to Mt Duneed Primary School as an extra classroom. A new independent school, Freshwater Creek Steiner School, opened on a different site in 2000.

During the early 1970s, the principal of the Freshwater Creek state school was Graham Brown, who had four children: Phillip, Noel, Helen and Wendy. Wendy attended Oberon High School and, after a brief marriage to Michael Harmer from Geelong, became the famous comedian, Wendy Harmer.

== St David's Lutheran Church ==
St David's Lutheran Church and Cemetery, on the Anglesea Road, is a historic church which is both listed on the Victorian Heritage Register and classified by the National Trust of Australia. The current bluestone church dates from 1866, although a church had existed on the site since 1859. The church has a strong association with the early German pioneers who settled in the area, and the attached graveyard has historical significance as one of the few in the state to still survive. Services are held at the church on the third Sunday of every month, run by St Paul's Lutheran Church in Grovedale, which was designed by the same architect.
