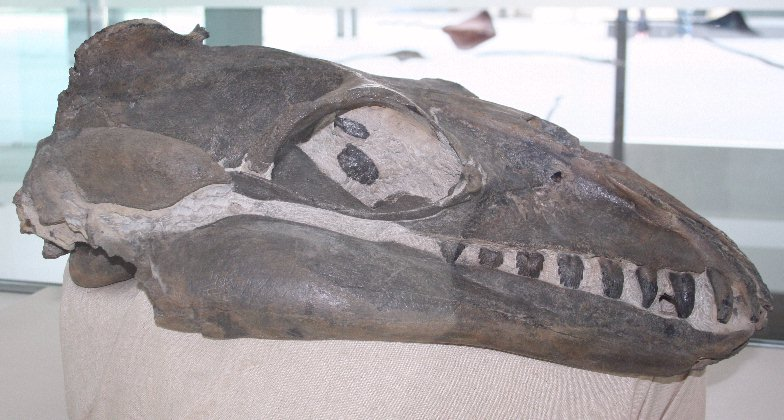
- Skull of Janjucetus

Scientific classification
- Kingdom: Animalia
- Phylum: Chordata
- Class: Mammalia
- Order: Artiodactyla
- Infraorder: Cetacea
- Parvorder: Mysticeti
- Family: †Mammalodontidae; Mitchell, 1989

Genera
- Janjucetus; Mammalodon

Synonyms
- Janjucetidae Fitzgerald, 2006

= Mammalodontidae =

Mammalodontidae Temporal range: Late Oligocene

Extinct family of mammals

Mammalodontidae is a family of extinct whales known from the Oligocene of Australia and New Zealand.

There are currently two genera in this family: Janjucetus and Mammalodon. After a new cladistic analysis by Fitzgerald (2010), Janjucetus was transferred into Mammalodontidae, thereby making Janjucetidae a junior synonym of Mammalodontidae.

Analysing the jaw morphology of the toothed mysticetes, Fitzgerald 2012 found eight mandibular characters unique to the members of Mammalodontidae:

- the mandibular symphysis is short, has a rugose joint surface, but lacks a symphyseal groove. In archaeocetes the symphysis is long. In modern mysticetes, in contrast, the symphysis is very small, its joint surfaces are smooth, and there is a groove on the interior side of the mandible that accommodates the symphyseal ligament which enables them to open their mouth wide.
- the external foramina on the mandible are relatively large (smaller or absent in later mysticetes)
- the postcanines sit in a longitudinal groove flanked by a lateral edge (the "alveolar margin")
- the alveolar (upper) margin forms an angle with the ventral (lower) margin (like in archaeocetes)
- the ventral margin is straight in the posterior half of the mandible
- teeth have longitudinal ridges
- posterior postcanines have two roots joined below the crown base
- postcanines are densely packed without long diastemata

From these mandibular features, Fitzgerald 2006 concluded that in mysticetes enlarge oral cavities adapted for suction feeding evolved before mandibular adaptations for bulk filter feeding, like for example, kinetic jaw joints.
