= Bellbrae =

- Town
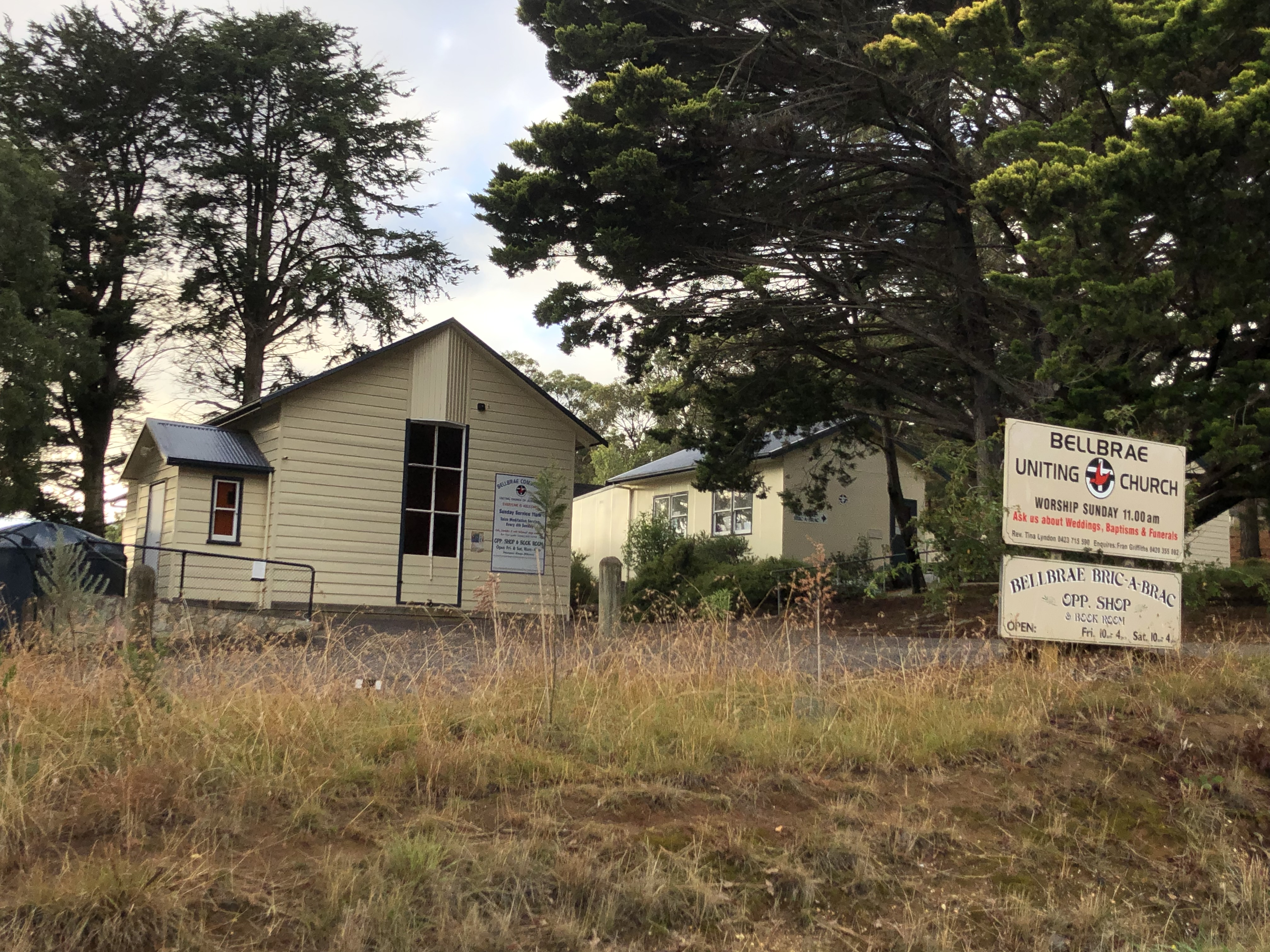
- Bellbrae Uniting Church and op shop

- Coordinates: 38°20′S 144°16′E
- Country: Australia
- State: Victoria
- LGA: Surf Coast Shire
- Location: 13 km (8.1 mi) ENE of Anglesea; 7 km (4.3 mi) W of Torquay; 24 km (15 mi) S of Geelong; 101 km (63 mi) SW of Melbourne

Government
  - State electorate: Polwarth
  - Federal division: Corangamite
- Elevation: 86 m (282 ft)

Population
  - Total: 865 (2016 census)
- Postcode: 3228
Localities around Bellbrae
Paraparap	Freshwater Creek	Torquay
Anglesea	Bellbrae	Jan Juc
Anglesea, Victoria	Bells Beach	Jan Juc

Bellbrae is a locality in Victoria, Australia located just off the Great Ocean Road between Torquay and Anglesea. At the 2016 census, Bellbrae had a population of 865.

== History ==
Bellbrae Post Office opened on 1 July 1923 (renamed from an earlier Jan Juc office) and closed in 1982.

== Facilities ==
Bellbrae has a public hall, a football oval where the Aireys Inlet Eels (a junior Australian Rules club) play their home games, Bellbrae Primary School and a winery.

== Community ==
Bellbrae is mainly home to hobby farms and/or produce farms. An estimated 500 residents live in an area of 12 km^{2}.
