= Tiger Rail Trail =

Rail trail in Victoria, Australia

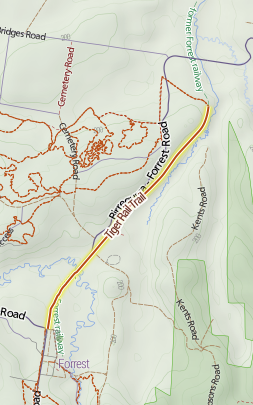

The Tiger Rail Trail or Birregurra-Forrest Rail Trail is a 4.4 kilometre rail trail following the route of the former Forrest railway line in Victoria, Australia.

The branch line from Birregurra to Forrest opened in June 1891. The town of Forrest was built at the terminus in 1890. The line carried passengers and freight, including agricultural produce. The station included a locomotive turntable, parcels shed, goods platform and crane.

The branch line closed in 1957. The "Tiger" name references the black and yellow striped converted Dodge sedan rail motor that serviced the line in its later years.
