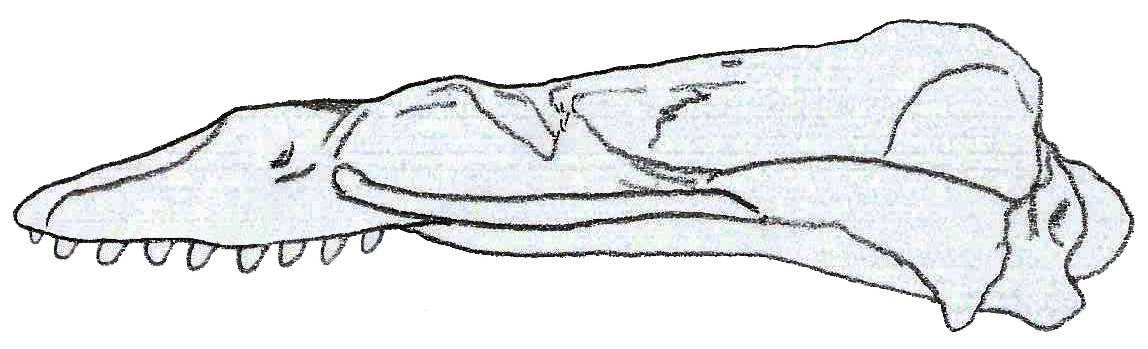
- Skull

Scientific classification
- Kingdom: Animalia
- Phylum: Chordata
- Class: Mammalia
- Order: Artiodactyla
- Infraorder: Cetacea
- Family: †Mammalodontidae
- Genus: †Mammalodon; Pritchard, 1939

Species
- †M. colliveri Pritchard, 1939 (type); †M. hakataramea Fordyce and Marx, 2016

= Mammalodon =

Mammalodon Temporal range: Late Oligocene, 25.7–23.9 Ma

Extinct genus of marine mammals

Mammalodon is an extinct genus of archaic baleen whale belonging to the family Mammalodontidae.

== Taxonomy ==
Mammalodon within Mysticeti

- Cetacea
  - Odontoceti (toothed whales)
  - Mysticeti (baleen whales)
    - Mammalodontidae
      - Janjucetus
      - Mammalodon
    - - Aetiocetidae
      - - Eomysticetidae
        - Modern baleen whales

Phylogenetic tree showing Mammalodon at the base of Mysticeti

The fossils of Mammalodon were found to be around 25.7–23.9 million years old, dating to the Late Oligocene. The holotype for M. colliveri, NMV P199986 though formerly MUGD 1874, is an incomplete skull of an adult individual collected in 1932 by George Baxter Pritchard, Alan Frostick, and Frederick Stanley Colliver—to which owes the species name—in Jan Juc, Victoria in Australia; specimen NMV P17535, consisting of a lower left molar, probably also belongs to NMV P199986. NMV P173220 consists of a left periotic bone. NMV P199587 is a partial skeleton, consisting of part of the head, spine, and arm; specimen NMV P198871, an ulna, very likely also belongs to NMV P199587. The second species, M. hakataramea, was discovered in the Kokoamu Greensand of New Zealand. Mammalodon fossils have been found in Australia and New Zealand.

Mammalodon was, at first, considered to be a member of Archaeoceti, an ancient group of whales, which was evidenced by its apparent ancient features, such as the variety of differently shaped teeth in its jaw (heterodonty) that modern whales lack. Mammalodon was first considered to be a baleen whale in a 1982 study despite having no baleen; instead, they cited other similarities such as loosely sutured bones in the snout, a broad and flat roof of the mouth, and an unjointed mandibular symphysis between the two halves of the jawbone. It belongs to the family Mammalodontidae, along with Janjucetus. These whales and Llanocetus may form a clade of toothed baleen whales of the Southern Hemisphere, a sister clade to Aetiocetidae and more modern baleen-bearing baleen whales.

The name Mammalodon is said to be derived from English mammal and Ancient Greek odontos tooth, meaning "mammal tooth", as its molar teeth are similar to those found in terrestrial carnivores. The Ancient Greek for "tooth" is, however, odous (ὀδούς).

== Description ==
Mammalodon, with a length of 3 metres (9.8 ft), was smaller and more primitive than modern baleen whales. Unlike other baleen whales, Mammalodon had a blunt and rounded snout. The left maxilla—upper jaw—of specimen NMV P199986 preserved four premolars and three molars, and the space between the teeth (diastema) increased towards back into the mouth. The molars decreased in size back into the mouth, like in archaeocetes, and the bottom jaw had two more molars than the upper jaw. The specimen's lower jaw indicates it had 24 lower teeth in all, all tightly spaced together. The upper teeth all looked the same (monodonty), whereas the bottom teeth varied in shape (polydonty) which is an ancient characteristic of whales. There were three lower incisor teeth, and one upper incisor with possibly two or three vestigial incisors. The teeth were likely never replaced, and the whale had the same set of teeth throughout its life. The single upper incisor was markedly smaller than the other teeth, and smaller than the upper incisors of Janjucetus. The cheek teeth—molars and premolars—were all double-rooted, and the lower molars were serrated and triangular.

In the holotype of M. colliveri, only the second vertebra of the neck—the axis—is preserved. Unlike in modern baleen whales, but similar to archaeocetes and the ancient toothed baleen whale Aetiocetus, the breastbone is composed of several pieces. The top-most breastbone, the manubrium, is T-shaped and wider than is long like archaeocetes, but plate-like and compressed like modern baleen whales. Unlike in modern whales though similar to archaeocetes, the thyrohyoid bone of the hyoid apparatus used to hold up the tongue is large and tubular as opposed to plate-like. It probably had a fused mandibular symphysis linking the two halves of the jaw together, unlike in later and modern baleen whales.

== Palaeobiology ==
As with the closely related genus Janjucetus, Mammalodon lacked baleen, instead possessing well-developed teeth. As such, it was not able to filter-feed in the same manner as extant baleen whales, making its diet and ecological niche a mystery. As the teeth are widely spaced, they may have developed a method of filter-feeding unlike that of other whales. It may have been a bottom filter feeder, its blunt snout helping to suck up organisms from the sea floor.
