= Wurdiboluc =

Locality in Victoria, Australia

- Town
- Coordinates: 38°17′21″S 144°03′05″E
- Country: Australia
- State: Victoria
- LGA: Surf Coast Shire
- Location: 33 km (21 mi) SW of Geelong; 97 km (60 mi) SW of Melbourne

Government
  - State electorate: Polwarth
  - Federal division: Wannon

Population
  - Total: 147 (SAL 2021)
- Postcode: 3240
Localities around Wurdiboluc
Winchelsea	Buckley	Modewarre
Winchelsea	Wurdiboluc	Modewarre; Gherang
Winchelsea South	Wensleydale	Gherang

Wurdiboluc is a locality in Surf Coast Shire, Victoria, Australia. In the 2016 census, Wurdiboluc had a population of 138 people.

A post office was opened in July 1927 as Wurdiboluc State School PO. A receiving office had previously existed since around 1902. It was renamed Wurdiboluc PO in 1932 and closed on 30 September 1966.

Wurdiboluc once had a state school; the date of its closure is unknown. In 1902, a proposal was made to amalgamate the school with that at nearby Wensleydale, on a new central site; instead, the Wensleydale school was closed in 1903, and the Department of Education arranged to transport the Wensleydale students to the Wurdiboluc school.

Newspaper advertisements from the 1860s refer to a "Wurdee Boluc Hotel" or "Reeves' Telegraph Hotel" at Wurdiboluc.

Wurdee Boluc Reservoir, the main water storage for the city of Geelong, is located in Wurdiboluc. The reservoir has picnic facilities, and is also used for fishing. The adjacent Wurdee Boluc Water Treatment Plant is responsible for filtering, disinfecting and fluoridating Geelong's water supply.
