= Bruce Anderson (footballer, born 1895) =

Australian rules footballer (1895–1957)

Personal information
- Full name: Lawrence Roderick Bruce Anderson
- Born: 28 May 1895; Mount Moriac, Victoria
- Died: 8 July 1957 (aged 62); Barrabool, Victoria
- Original team: Barrabool

Playing career^{1}
Years	Club	Games (Goals)
1919	Geelong	2 (0)
- ^{1} Playing statistics correct to the end of 1919.

Lawrence Roderick Bruce Anderson (28 May 1895 – 8 July 1957) was an Australian rules footballer who played with Geelong in the Victorian Football League (VFL).

== Family ==
The son of William Anderson, and Christina Anderson, née McKenzie, Lawrence Roderick Bruce Anderson was born at Mount Moriac, Victoria on 28 May 1895.
