= Jan Juc =

- Town
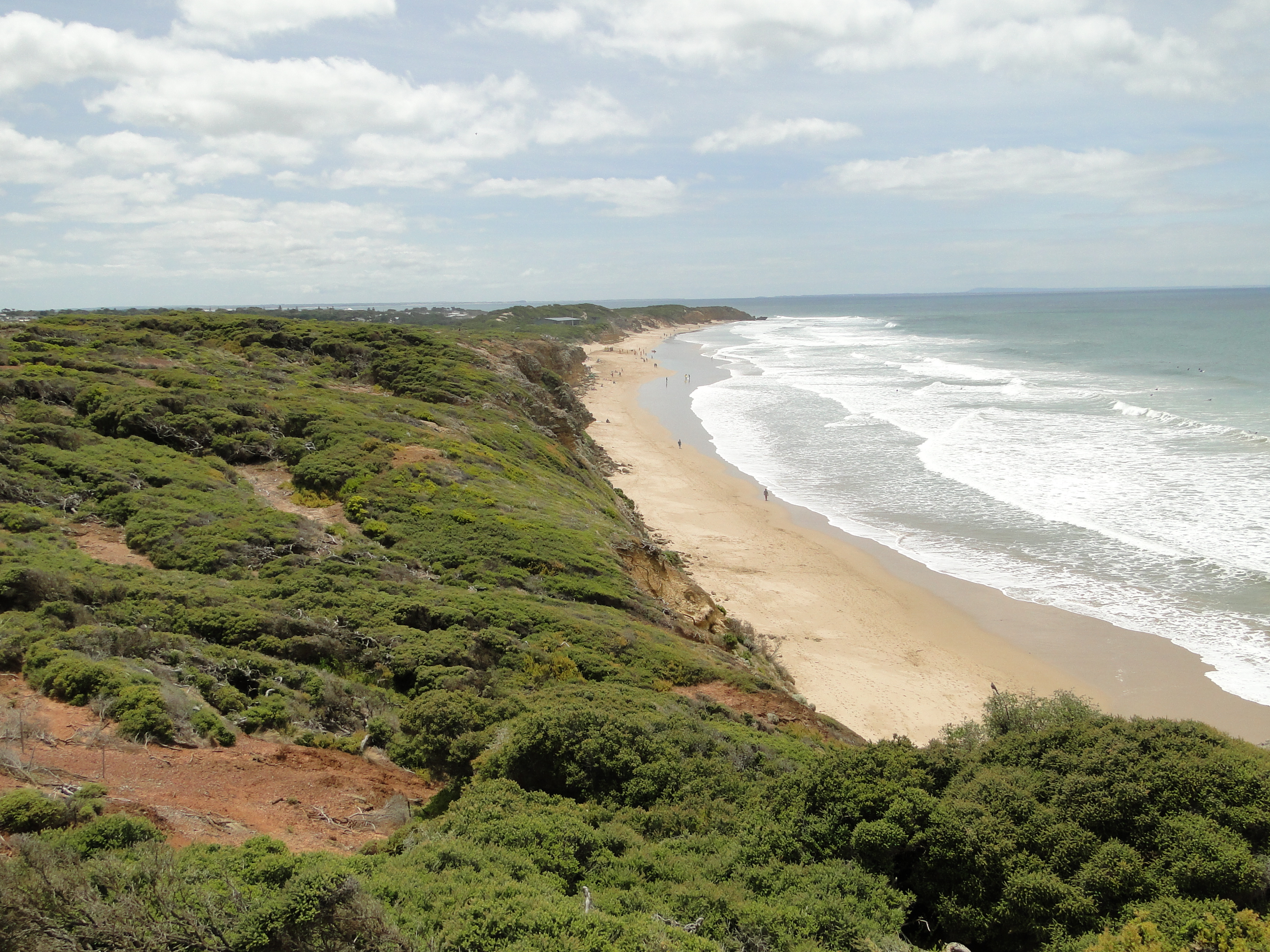
- Jan Juc Beach

- Coordinates: 38°20′S 144°18′E
- Country: Australia
- State: Victoria
- LGA: Surf Coast Shire
- Location: 100 km (62 mi) SW of Melbourne; 26 km (16 mi) S of Geelong; 16 km (9.9 mi) ENE of Anglesea; 6 km (3.7 mi) S of Torquay

Government
  - State electorate: South Barwon
  - Federal division: Corangamite
- Elevation: 29 m (95 ft)

Population
  - Total: 3,683 (2016 census)
- Postcode: 3228
Localities around Jan Juc
Bellbrae	Torquay	Torquay
Bellbrae	Jan Juc	Torquay
Bells Beach	Bass Strait	Bass Strait

Jan Juc (/dʒæn dʒʌk/) (sometimes colloquially shortened to Juc) is a suburb of Torquay, Victoria in Australia. At the 2021 census, Jan Juc had a population of 4,151.

== History ==
Nearby Bellbrae was originally called Jan Juc but was renamed in 1923, so the Jan Juc Post Office, which opened on 25 January 1862, was in fact in Bellbrae. There has never been a post office in the current Jan Juc.

The development of housing estates in Jan Juc, which began in the 1960s, have linked it to adjacent Torquay, on the other side of Spring Creek. By 1992 Jan Juc had around 1,200 houses, with a third of these being holiday homes.

Jan Juc, and the Torquay generally, is located in the traditional country of the Wadawurrung people, part of the Aboriginal Kulin nation. Aboriginal occupation of that area of the Surf Coast area goes back thousands of years.

=== Jan Juc Beach ===
The Jan Juc beach lies between Rocky Point to the east and Bird Rock to the west, and is bounded by high cliffs, apart from the middle where an ephemeral creek enters Bass Strait through sand dunes. The beach is patrolled during summer months by the Jan Juc Surf Life Saving Club.

Jan Juc beach is home to the Jan Juc Formation, of which its Marl formation has been biostratigraphically and radiometrically dated to the Chattian (Oligocene) (28.4 - 23.0 Ma). The Formation is known for various fossil discoveries. In the late 1990s, a surfer found the fossilised remains of an extinct genus of whale on a beach near Jan Juc. It was named Janjucetus hunderi, after the location. The remains of other extinct whales Mammalodon, Prosqualodon and Waipatia have also been discovered at Jan Juc.

== Sport ==
Jan Juc has a Surf Life Saving Club which includes a junior "Nippers" program. The Jan Juc Sharks cricket club has eight junior teams and four senior teams that compete in the Geelong Junior Cricket Association and the Bellarine Peninsula Cricket Association respectively. Jan Juc Boardriders is the local surfing club.
