= Modewarre =

- Suburb
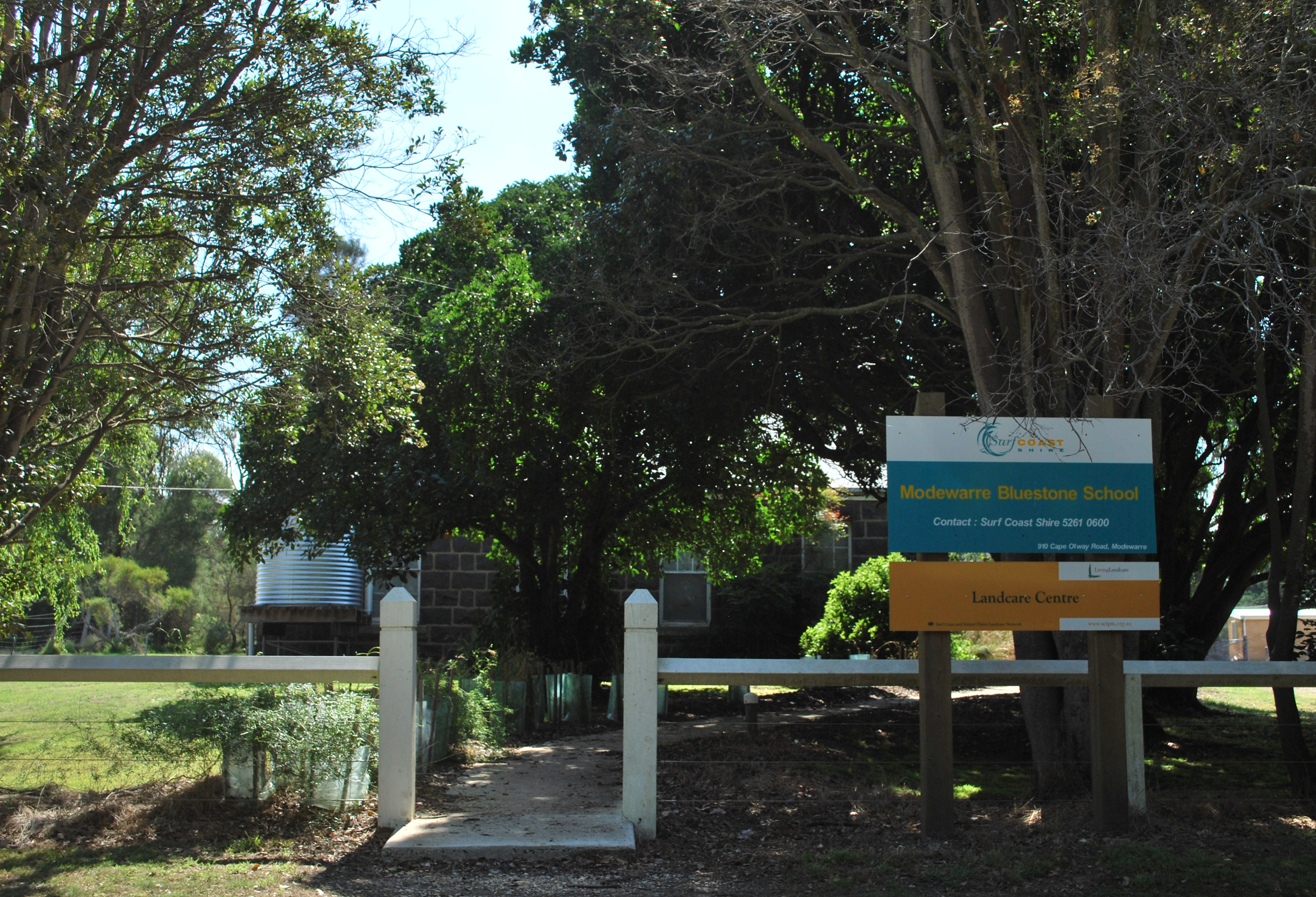
- Former Modewarre Primary School

- Coordinates: 38°15′58″S 144°07′19″E
- Country: Australia
- State: Victoria
- LGA: Surf Coast Shire
- Location: 24 km (15 mi) SW of Geelong; 89 km (55 mi) SW of Melbourne

Government
  - State electorate: Polwarth
  - Federal division: Wannon

Population
  - Total: 277 (SAL 2021)
- Postcode: 3240
Suburbs around Modewarre
Buckley	Buckley	Mount Moriac
Wurdiboluc	Modewarre	Moriac
Gherang	Gherang	Paraparap

Modewarre is a locality in the Surf Coast Shire, Victoria, Australia. The town adjoins Lake Modewarre. In the 2016 census, Modewarre had a population of 276 people.

Modewarre Primary School began as a local Anglican school in the 1850s, became a vested National School in 1859, and closed in 1971.

A post office at Modewarre opened in 1859 and closed in 1967.

The Modewarre Memorial Hall was erected in 1923 in memory of World War I. The Modewarre Avenue of Honour on Cape Otway Road was planted in 1918, and is the last surviving Avenue of Honour in the Surf Coast Shire. Tree number #33 was planted to honour Albert Jacka, Australia's first winner of the Victoria Cross and a Modewarre local.

The town has a football club, Modewarre Football Club, which has existed since 1878. It currently plays in the Bellarine Football League, but formerly played in the Geelong & District Football League.

Construction of a $350 million world-class training and sports health facility at Modewarre was approved by the Victorian government in October 2020. The Cape Otway Road Australia (CORA) precinct will feature training, sport science, education and medical facilities as well as a 128-room residential hotel, wellness centre and retail village.
