= Buckley, Victoria =

Buckley
- Suburb
- Coordinates: 38°13′08″S 144°05′30″E
- Country: Australia
- State: Victoria
- LGA: Surf Coast Shire
- Location: 27 km (17 mi) SW of Geelong; 91 km (57 mi) SW of Melbourne

Government
  - State electorates: Polwarth; South Barwon
  - Federal division: Wannon

Population
  - Total: 228 (SAL 2021)
- Postcode: 3240
Suburbs around Buckley
| Inverleigh | Inverleigh; Gnarwarre | Gnarwarre |
| Winchelsea | Buckley | Mount Moriac |
| Modewarre | Wurdiboluc; Modewarre | Wurdiboluc |

Buckley is a locality in the Surf Coast Shire, Victoria, Australia. It was formerly known as Laketown. In the 2021 census, Buckley had a population of 227.

== Laketown ==
On 6 September 1854, approval was granted to James Callahan to open a hotel called the Lady of the Lake on Barrabool Road, at what is now Buckley, and the area began to be known as Laketown. The hotel reportedly flourished, being on the road to Colac, and became a social centre for the area. The hotel was a coach stop on the route to Colac, and the Duke of Edinburgh reportedly stopped there in 1870 while his party's horses were being rested. A post office opened at Laketown on 15 March 1872, and a store was added at around the same period.

A school was opened in 1878, close to the hotel, initially known as Mount Moriac State School (No. 2063), but renamed Laketown in 1883. A Laketown Football Club and Laketown Cricket Club existed in the 1870s, and had a sports ground west of the hotel. Laketown declined thereafter. The school closed in 1893, and was later used as a church and private residence. Laketown Post Office closed temporarily from 1 July to 1 October 1895, and then permanently on 1 October 1897. The license of the Lady of the Lake hotel lapsed in 1912. It became a private home but burned down in 1962. The former school is the only surviving remnant of the Laketown settlement, and is listed on the Surf Coast Shire heritage inventory as having state significance.

== Buckley ==
The first school in what is now Buckley, which pre-dated the one at the Laketown settlement, had opened in 1867 as Lake Modewarre School No. 926, a Catholic school. It was located on the corner of Buckley School Road and Buckley School South. Historian Ian Wynd wrote that it closed in 1874, but that some sources suggest it continued to 1883 and that its students were sent to the Laketown school. A second school, initially also named Lake Modewarre, opened in 1874 as School No. 1481. It changed its name to Buckley's Road State School in 1890, and again to Buckley State School in 1936. Buckley Primary School was closed and merged into Moriac Primary School, on the Moriac school site, in 1993.

The locality once had a railway station on the Port Fairy railway line. It was successively named Laketown, Modewarre, and then Buckley, as the name of the area changed over the years. The station was closed in 1955. The station also had its own post office, separate to that at the Laketown settlement. That post office was opened as Lake Town Railway Station Post Office on 1 May 1884, renamed Modewarre Railway Station PO on 10 March 1885, Buckley's Road PO on 15 August 1890, Buckley Railway Station PO in 1910, and Buckley PO on 18 October 1848. It closed on 30 June 1970.

Buckley remains a small rural locality. The Buckley Tennis and Social Club is among the last community institutions remaining in the town. The Erinvale Thoroughbreds stud, based on the historic Carawartha property, is at Buckley.
