= Bambra =

- Town
- Coordinates: 38°21′42″S 143°57′08″E
- Country: Australia
- State: Victoria
- LGA: Surf Coast Shire
- Location: 43 km (27 mi) SW of Geelong; 108 km (67 mi) SW of Melbourne

Government
  - State electorate: Polwarth
  - Federal division: Wannon

Population
  - Total: 115 (SAL 2021)
- Postcode: 3241
Localities around Bambra
Birregurra	Winchelsea South	Winchelsea South
Deans Marsh	Bambra	Wensleydale
Deans Marsh	Boonah	Wensleydale

Bambra is a locality in the Surf Coast Shire, Victoria, Australia. In the 2016 census, Bambra had a population of 101 people. It is named after an Aboriginal word for mushroom.

The locality was initially named "Retreat", but was later renamed Bambra after an Aboriginal word for mushroom. The area was opened up for selection in the 1860s. Bambra State School was opened on 20 September 1866, closed temporarily in 1945–1946, and closed permanently in 1969. The Bambra Chapel, a Bible Christian Church, was opened in 1868, and became a Methodist church in 1903. A second church, the Holy Trinity Anglican Church, held its first service on 25 May 1902. Bambra Post Office opened on 23 September 1892 and closed on 29 September 1973. The churches have also closed, although one survives as a private house.

The area has predominantly been used for agricultural, pastoral and dairying purposes; however, a coal mine in adjacent Winchelsea South, sometimes referred to as the Bambra mine, was active from 1921 until between 1928 and 1931, and from 1943 to 1957. Since 2013, the area has been home to the Meadow Music Festival every March featuring various alternative and indie musicians at the Otway Hinterlands Meadow.

The locality still has a public hall, cemetery and a Hare Krishna retreat.
