= Boonah, Victoria =

Boonah
- Suburb
- Coordinates: 38°25′32″S 143°58′47″E
- Country: Australia
- State: Victoria
- LGA: Surf Coast Shire
- Location: 46 km (29 mi) SW of Geelong; 112 km (70 mi) SW of Melbourne

Government
  - State electorate: Polwarth
  - Federal division: Wannon

Population
  - Total: 18 (SAL 2021)
- Postcode: 3235
Suburbs around Boonah
Deans Marsh	Bambra	Wensleydale
Deans Marsh	Boonah	Eastern View
Pennyroyal	Benwerrin	Big Hill

Boonah is a locality in the Surf Coast Shire, Victoria, Australia.

== History ==
The locality was the base for various sawmilling operations from the 1880s.

The Boonah State School opened on 15 August 1882, servicing families working at the Benwerrin coal mine, the three local sawmills and on local farms. It closed in 1927 due to falling attendance. Boonah Post Office opened on 24 November 1887, became a receiving office on 21 August 1919, became a post office again on 1 July 1927, and closed on 26 September 1929.

== Present day ==
Today, most of the locality is protected forest contained in either the Great Otway National Park or the Otway Forest Park; the remainder, located in Boonah's north, is private farmland. The Bambra-Boonah Road, which runs through the latter area, is the only mapped road in the locality.
