= Ss Johns' Anglican Church, Colac =

Anglican church in Colac, Victoria, Australia

Ss Johns' Anglican Church
- St John the Baptist & St John the Evangelist Anglican Church
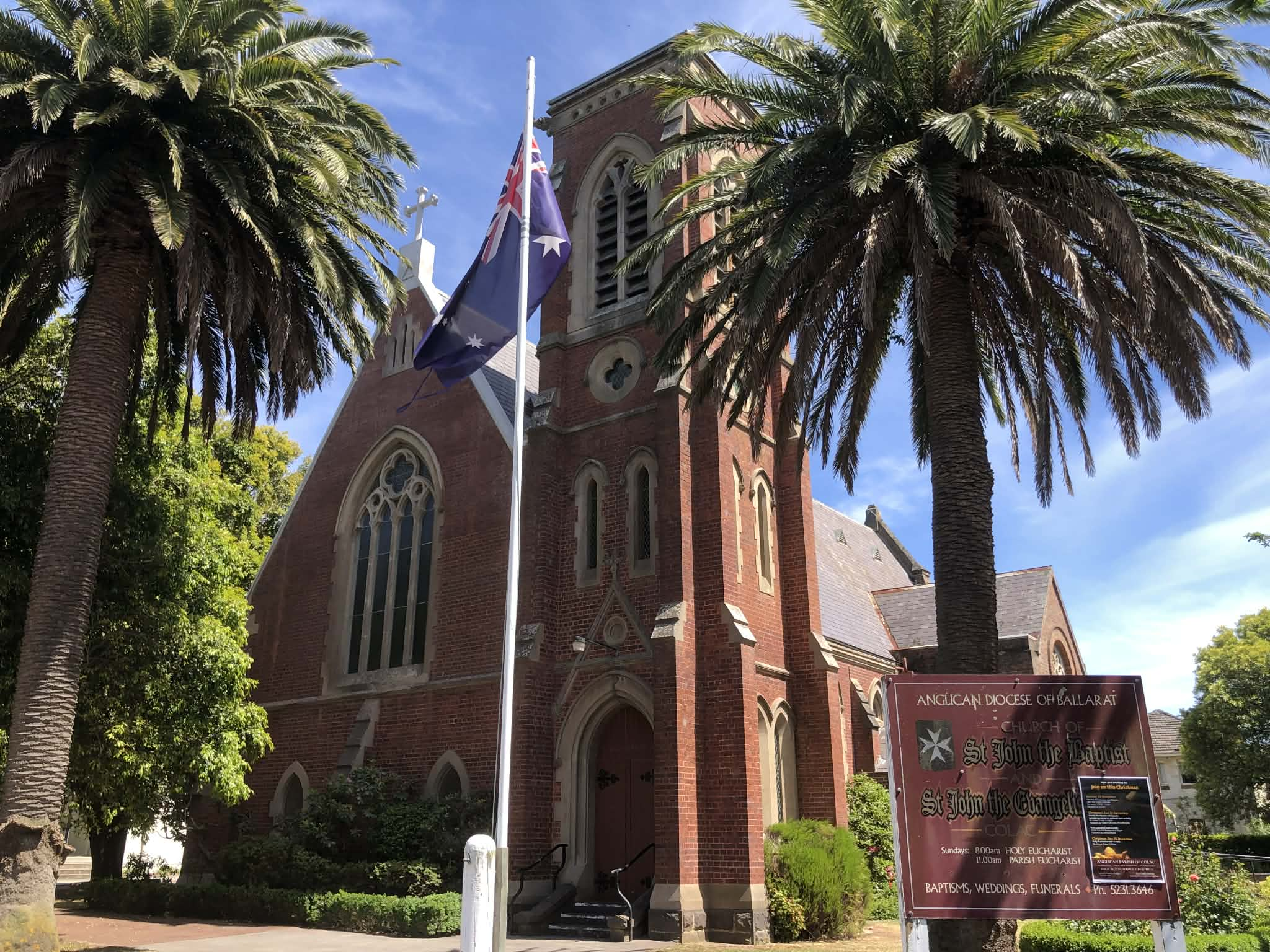
- Ss Johns' Anglican Church, January 2026
- Ss Johns' Anglican Church
- 38°20′09″S 143°35′21″E
- Location: Corner of Pollack and Hesse Streets, Colac, Victoria
- Country: Australia
- Denomination: Anglican Church of Australia
- Website: www.anglicancolac.org

History
- Status: Active

Architecture
- Architect(s): Henderson & Davidson (original church), Tappin, Gilbert & Dennehy (present church)
- Style: Gothic Revival
- Years built: 1889-1891 (present church)
- Completed: 1870 (original church), 1891 (present church)

Administration
- Province: Victoria
- Diocese: Ballarat

Clergy
- Vicar: Rev. Jeremy Morgan

Ss Johns' Anglican Church, formally St John the Baptist & St John the Evangelist Anglican Church is an Anglican church in Colac, Victoria, Australia. The present church, completed in 1891, replaced an earlier church on the site, and forms part of the Anglican Diocese of Ballarat.

== History ==
Prior to the erection of a physical church building, Anglican families would either attend the Presbyterian or Methodist church in Colac, wait for visiting clergy, who would visit in intervals and sporadically, or travel to Birregurra. A meeting was held in the Temperance Hall regarding the construction of an Anglican church in 1864, and on 8 May 1870 a church was constructed, designed by the architects George Henderson and Alexander Davidson. It was officially opened by Rev. Astley Cooper (from St Paul's Anglican Church, Geelong, and on 18 April 1882, Dr Moorehouse, the Bishop of Melbourne, consecrated the church, dedicating it to St John the Evangelist.

Land was set aside for the present church at the time of construction of the original church. The foundation stone was laid for the present church on 18 July 1889 by Mr J. R. Hopkins of Winchelsea. The church was designed by Tappin, Gilbert & Dennehy, and was officially opened by the Bishop of Ballarat at the time, Dr. Thornton, on 24 June 1891. Seeing as the date was the same as the birth of St John the Baptist, and that the old church was dedicated to another St John, Dr. Thornton decided to dedicate the new church to both saints.

The church was extended in 1933, designed by Louis Reginald Williams, which included a lofty chancel, sanctuary, organ chamber, apsidal side chamber and vestries. The organ was installed into the church in 1924, and was originally built in 1909 by Frederick Taylor, and has moved around considerably, from private homes in the Melbourne suburbs of East St Kilda and North Fitzroy to its present location in the extended church building in 1934.

=== Parish Hall & Kindergarten ===
Louis Reginald Williams also designed the adjacent Parish Hall. The building, in Arts and Crafts style, was largely funded by Esther Walton and the Young Helpers League. The clinker bricks used in its construction were sourced locally, and it is architecturally notable for its shingled bargeboards, round front door and muted yellow and blue windows.
