= Big Hill (Surf Coast Shire) =

- Town
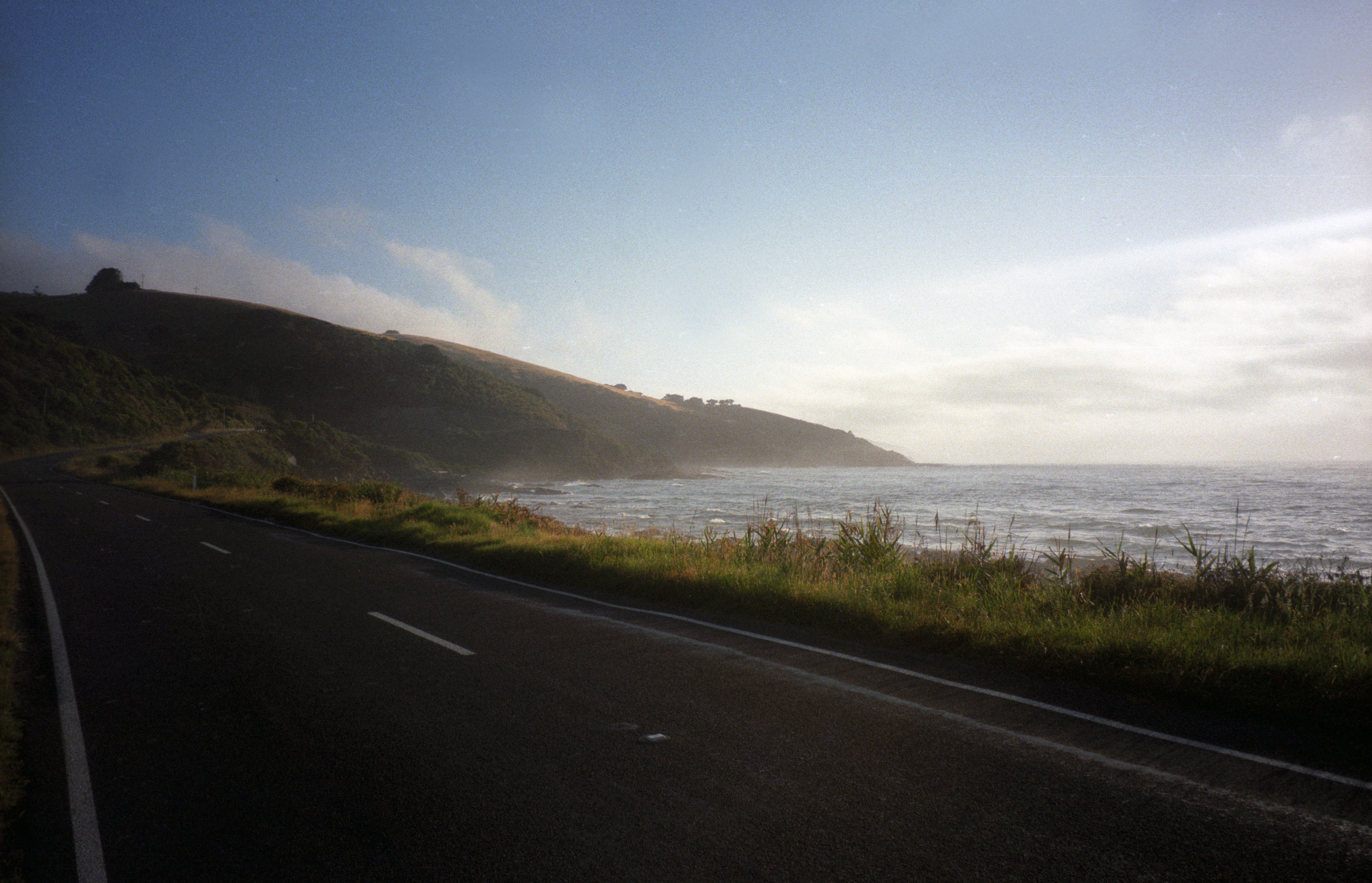
- Big Hill, Great Ocean Road, 1999

- Coordinates: 38°28′49″S 144°00′18″E
- Country: Australia
- State: Victoria
- LGA: Surf Coast Shire
- Location: 48 km (30 mi) SW of Geelong; 112 km (70 mi) SW of Melbourne

Government
  - State electorate: Polwarth
  - Federal division: Wannon

Population
  - Total: 38 (SAL 2021)
- Postcode: 3231
Localities around Big Hill
Benwerrin	Boonah	Eastern View
Lorne	Big Hill	Bass Strait
Lorne	Bass Strait	Bass Strait

Big Hill is a locality in the Surf Coast Shire, Victoria, Australia.

== History ==
The locality was first developed with the construction of the Great Ocean Road over the eponymous hill in 1920–21, when 100 returned soldiers were employed cutting a road through the area. In 1924, to help raise funds for the continued construction of the road, the Great Ocean Road Trust created a subdivision of 140 allotments named the "Big Hill Estate". Although the blocks were sold, a township never developed.

A guest house, "Iluka", was built on the new road, but burned down in 1926. In the late 1940s, nationally renowned landscape designer Edna Walling bought 12 acres (5 hectares) of the Big Hill Estate with a view to creating a village there, but decided that it would spoil the location, and built a house, "East Point", instead. Walling moved to Queensland in 1967 and the house was burned down in a bushfire the same year. The ruins are listed on the Surf Coast Shire heritage inventory.

The Black Stump Tearooms and a caravan park existed on the site of the Santa Monica Campus of St Bernard's College, which existed by the 1950s, but were both destroyed by the 1983 Ash Wednesday bushfires.

Big Hill remains a little-developed stretch of the Great Ocean Road, with much of the locality being within the Great Otway National Park. The House at Big Hill, which won numerous architecture awards, was built there in 2011. Although the Big Hill campsite is a popular camping destination in the area, it is formally in adjacent Lorne.
