= Deans Marsh =

- Town
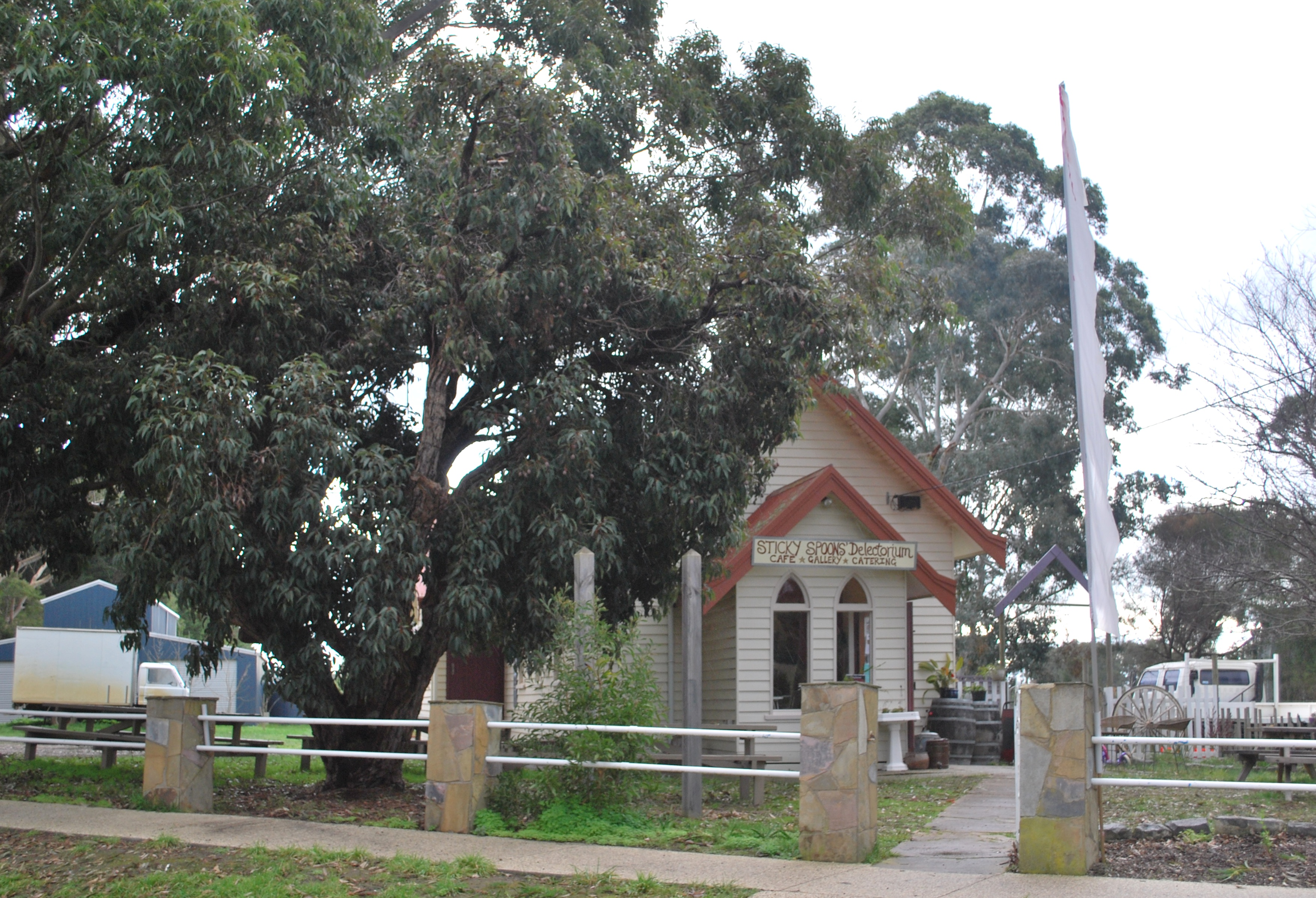
- A former church at Deans Marsh

- Coordinates: 38°23′S 143°53′E
- Country: Australia
- State: Victoria
- LGA: Surf Coast Shire
- Location: 135 km (84 mi) SW of Melbourne; 61 km (38 mi) SW of Geelong; 34 km (21 mi) E of Colac; 23 km (14 mi) NW of Lorne

Government
  - State electorate: Polwarth
  - Federal division: Wannon

Population
  - Total: 368 (SAL 2021)
- Postcode: 3235
Localities around Deans Marsh
| Birregurra | Birregurra | Bambra |
| Whoorel | Deans Marsh | Boonah |
| Murroon | Pennyroyal | Benwerrin |

Deans Marsh is a town in Victoria, Australia, located 23 kilometres (14 mi) inland from Lorne. At the 2021 census, Deans Marsh had a population of 368. Deans Marsh is part of the Otway Harvest Trail, with the Pennyroyal Raspberry Farm and the Gentle Annie Berry Gardens nearby. There are three wineries in the area - Blakes Estate, Alt Road and Heroes Vineyard. The Store is located in the centre of the town, servicing locals and tourists with provisions, local produce, alcohol and a cafe. The Deans Marsh Community Cottage is the local Neighbourhood House that provides the community with weekly health and wellbeing classes including Yoga & Pilates; skills workshops, a monthly Community Dinner and annual events including the Deans Marsh Festival. Also located in Deans Marsh is Yan Yan Gurt West, a sheep farm known for its 1880s woolshed and innovative practices in regenerative agriculture and agroforestry.

== History ==
Deans Marsh Post Office opened on 3 November 1866.

The Forrest railway line, which branched from the Warrnambool line at Birregurra, was opened to Deans Marsh on 19 December 1889, and was extended to Forrest on 5 June 1891. The line was closed on 4 March 1957.

On Ash Wednesday 1983, a fire started at Deans Marsh, which spread rapidly, becoming a huge blaze which razed a considerable area of the Victoria's Surfcoast, destroying a large number of houses in Barwon Downs, Lorne, Fairhaven, Aireys Inlet, and Anglesea, and resulted in the deaths of three people.

== Notable people ==
Deans Marsh is the birthplace of the renowned Wagnerian soprano Marjorie Lawrence (1907–1979).
