= Pennyroyal Falls =

Waterfall in Victoria, Australia

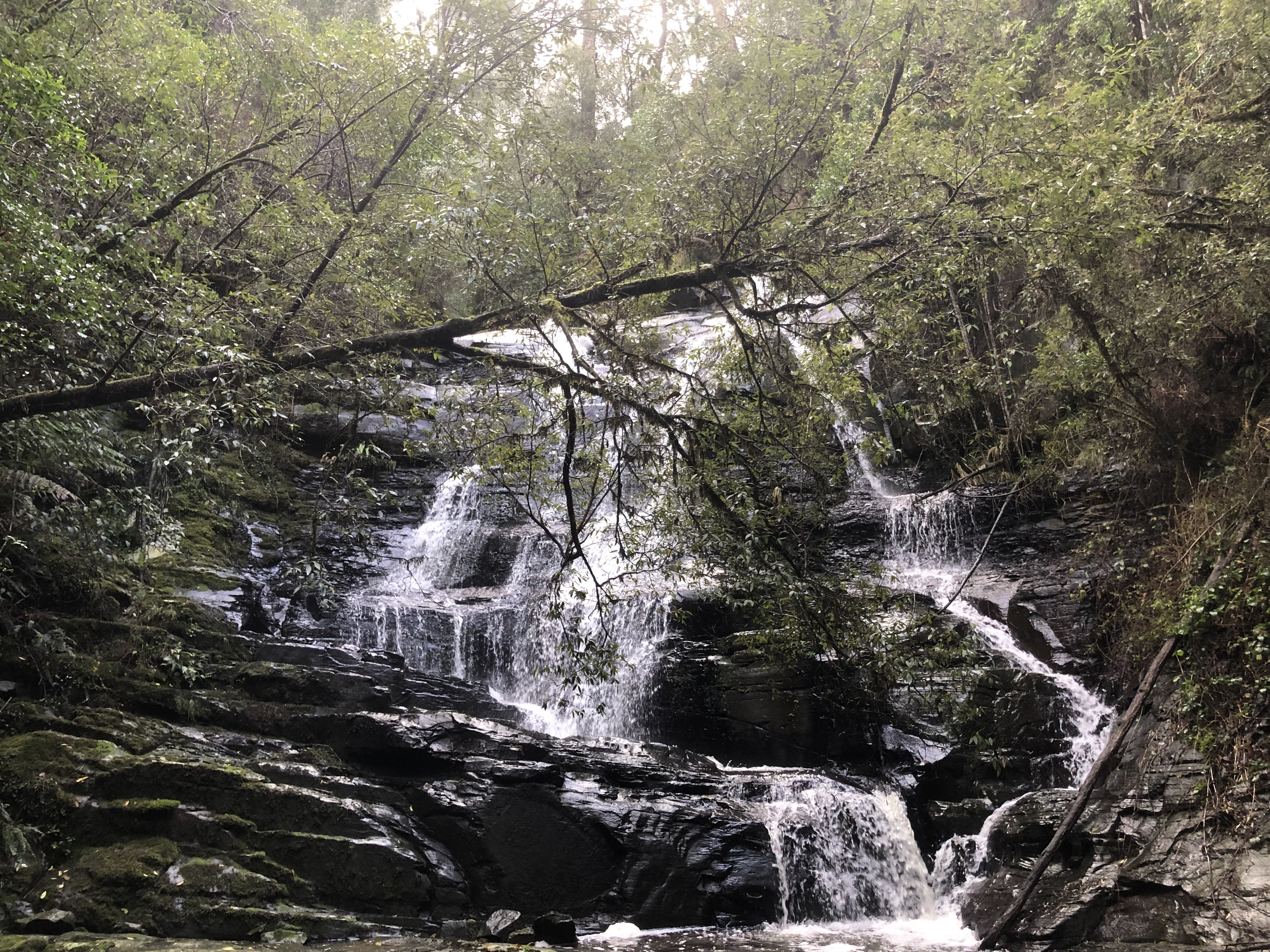
- Pennyroyal Falls

- Location within Victoria
- Location: Pennyroyal, Victoria, Australia
- Coordinates: 38°27′53″S 143°53′48″E
- Type: Plunge
- Total height: 10.87 m (35.7 ft)
- Number of drops: 1
- Watercourse: Acquila Creek

Pennyroyal Falls is a waterfall on Aquila Creek in the Pennyroyal region of the Otway Ranges, Victoria, Australia. The waterfall consists of a single drop measuring approximately 10.87 metres. Aquila Creek flows into Pennyroyal Creek, which forms part of the Gellibrand River catchment.

== Description and access ==
Pennyroyal Falls takes its name from the nearby locality of Pennyroyal which, in turn, was named after the pennyroyal plant (Mentha pulegium), a species of mint that was introduced to the area during the nineteenth century.

Because Aquila Creek has a relatively small catchment area, the waterfall is seasonal and may cease flowing during extended dry periods. Following substantial rainfall, however, the creek produces a much stronger flow.

The waterfall can be reached by an informal, rough track through the forest that begins at Dunse Track. The path, marked by occasional pink ribbons, passes by adjacent waterfalls, including Terrace Falls, Dunse Falls, Arletts Falls and Paradox Falls. The walk requires negotiating creek crossings.

== See also ==
- Acquila Falls
- Arletts Falls
- Dunse Falls
