= Mount Moriac =

- Suburb
- Coordinates: 38°12′38″S 144°11′23″E
- Country: Australia
- State: Victoria
- LGA: Surf Coast Shire
- Location: 14 km (8.7 mi) SW of Geelong; 78 km (48 mi) SW of Melbourne

Government
  - State electorate: South Barwon
  - Federal division: Wannon

Population
  - Total: 251 (SAL 2021)
- Postcode: 3240
Suburbs around Mount Moriac
Gnarwarre	Barrabool	Waurn Ponds
Buckley	Mount Moriac	Mount Duneed
Modewarre	Moriac	Freshwater Creek

Mount Moriac is a locality in the Surf Coast Shire, Victoria, Australia. It is named after the 270-metre-high extinct volcano which is a prominent feature of the area. The name is believed to derive from the local Aboriginal word for hill. In the 2016 census, Mount Moriac had a population of 240 people.

A farming community developed at Mount Moriac as early as the 1840s, with a hotel opening in 1844. A Catholic school was opened by 1853, and a Catholic church (St Patrick's) built in 1863. It became the administrative centre of the district, with a police station, court, and the offices of the Barrabool Hills Road Board. By 1865, it also had a flour mill, several shops, the offices for the Shire of Barrabool, a hotel, and Presbyterian and Bible Christian churches. Mount Moriac State School opened in 1875.

The railway line was extended from Geelong to Colac in 1877, and a station was opened at nearby Moriac. A new township developed around the railway station, and over time took prominence over the older Mount Moriac settlement. The shire offices shifted to Geelong in 1949, and ceased holding meetings in the shire hall at Mount Moriac in 1976. Mount Moriac Primary School was merged into nearby Moriac Primary School in the 1990s.

Mount Moriac Railway Station PO opened on 16 October 1882, was renamed Mount Moriac PO in 1909, and closed on 31 July 1978. An earlier post office was opened at "Duneed" in 1854, renamed Mount Moriac PO in 1864, and renamed Moriac PO in 1909.

Today, the town has a hotel (Mount Moriac Hotel), a cemetery, and a Catholic church (St Patrick's). It also has a sporting reserve (Mount Moriac Reserve), with two ovals, a pavilion and club rooms, netball courts, tennis courts, and a pony club. It also has a memorial to the artist Arthur Streeton, who was born at Mount Moriac (in the area once known as Clifford) which is in the Parish of Duneed.

== Media ==
All Melbourne and Geelong FM stations can be received in Mount Moriac. It is also possible to pick up some Colac stations on FM in some parts of the area, notably Mixx FM, although the signals are weak. Television services in Mount Moriac are received from Melbourne transmitters. It is also possible to pick up Ballarat UHF channels in Mount Moriac in elevated areas, but a high-gain antenna is needed to receive all Ballarat TV transmissions.

== Clifford ==
In the early 1850s, a separate hamlet named Clifford, located within the modern Mount Moriac locality, developed around the intersection of Cape Otway and Devon Roads and the Princes Highway. There was a hotel (Gorell's Clifford Hotel), school, church, store and blacksmith there. This area took its name from Clifford Farm, the property of Lawrence Trewin.

The school, run by the Church of England, opened as Colac Road on 15 August 1853, was renamed Duneed in 1856, and renamed Clifford in 1871. The school closed on 18 August 1875, and the church closed in the same year. A fire on 27 May 1877 destroyed the hotel, store and post office. The hotel proprietor decided not to rebuild, and the hamlet had reportedly ceased to exist by 1890.
