= Bruce Anderson (footballer, born 1907) =

Australian rules footballer (1907–1965)

Personal information
- Full name: Robert Bruce Anderson
- Born: 20 February 1907; Essendon, Victoria
- Died: 31 August 1965 (aged 58)
- Original team: Ascot Vale
- Height: 180 cm (5 ft 11 in)
- Weight: 83 kg (183 lb)

Playing career^{1}
Years	Club	Games (Goals)
1931–1937	Essendon	97 (1)
- ^{1} Playing statistics correct to the end of 1937.

Robert Bruce Anderson (20 February 1907 – 31 August 1965) was an Australian rules footballer who played with Essendon in the Victorian Football League (VFL).

Anderson, a local recruit from Ascot Vale, was a half back. He was used both on the flanks and at centre half-back. In the 1934 VFL season he acted as Essendon's vice captain. He represented Victoria at interstate football every year from 1933 to 1935. Anderson consistently polled votes in the Brownlow Medal and had his best showing in 1936 when he was Essendon's second best placed player.

He captain-coached Yarraville in 1938 and 1939.
