= Moriac =

- Town
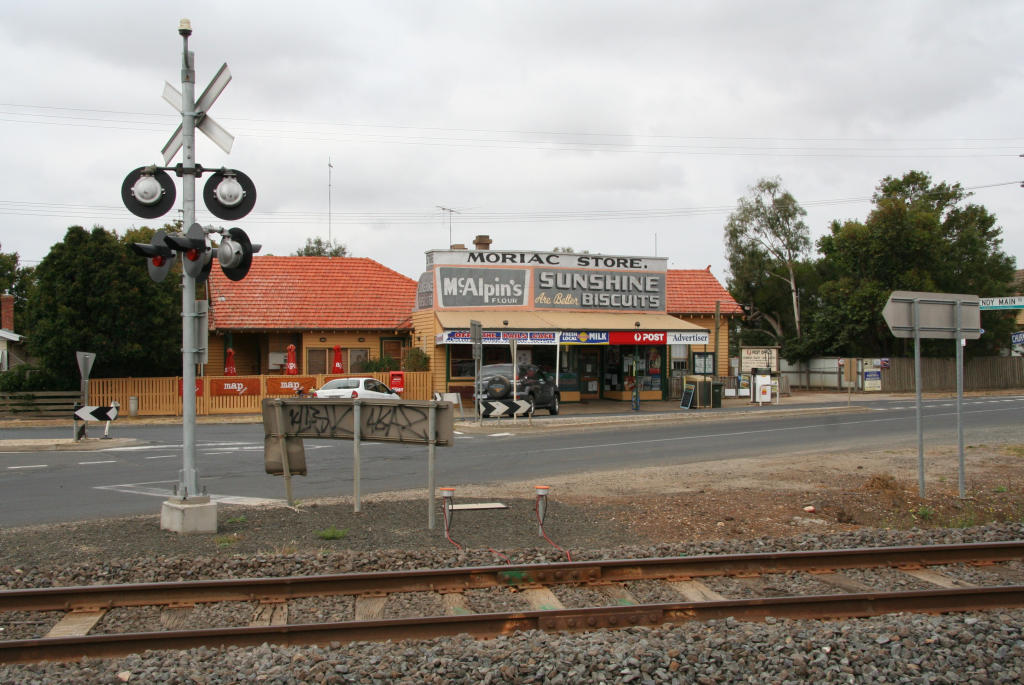
- General store and railway crossing on the main street

- Coordinates: 38°14′S 144°10′E
- Country: Australia
- State: Victoria
- LGA: Surf Coast Shire
- Location: 97 km (60 mi) SW of Melbourne; 22 km (14 mi) W of Geelong; 25 km (16 mi) E of Winchelsea

Government
  - State electorate: South Barwon
  - Federal division: Wannon

Population
  - Total: 852 (2021 census)
- Postcode: 3240
Localities around Moriac
Mount Moriac	Mount Moriac	Mount Moriac
Modewarre	Moriac	Freshwater Creek
Modewarre	Paraparap	Paraparap

Moriac is a town in Victoria, Australia, located approximately 22 kilometres (14 mi) west of Geelong. It forms part of the Surf Coast Shire. At the 2016 census, Moriac had a population of 782. A Post Office opened on 1 August 1854 as Duneed, was renamed Mount Moriac in 1864, and Moriac in about 1909.

The railway through Moriac opened in 1876, followed by the Wensleydale branch line which junctioned with the main line just past Moriac. The branch line opened in 1890 and closed in 1948. Moriac railway station was closed in October 1981.

The town was surveyed in the 1920s, around the Moriac railway station, which had been provided to serve the adjacent community of Mount Moriac. The town was initially slow to develop, but has grown to house a population of several hundred. Though still heavily rural in nature, the town now serves as a satellite village of Geelong, with many residents travelling into the city to work.

The town is home to Moriac Primary School, which has approximately 200 students and 10 teachers, a hotel, and a small shop. It also has a kindergarten. Recently, a pharmacy and a medical centre started . The town is expanding rapidly as a new estate will boost the population in the town, Hinterland Estate. There is also a new permit applied (2021) for release of 29 lots. The town is the birthplace of AFL Brownlow Medalist Gary Ablett Jr and his younger brother Nathan.
