= Forrest railway line =

Former railway line in Victoria, Australia

Forrest

Overview
- Status: Removed with partial conversion to rail trail
- Stations: 9

Service
- Type: Vic

History
- Opened: 1889/1891
- Closed: 4 March 1957

Technical
- Line length: 31 km (19 mi)

The Forrest railway line is a former branch railway in Victoria, Australia. It branched off the Warrnambool railway line at Birregurra, and ran through the foothills of the Otway Ranges to the town of Forrest.

It opened to Deans Marsh on 19 December 1889, and to Forrest on 5 June 1891. It had eight stations at opening: Whoorel, Deans Marsh, Arlett's Corner, Murroon, Dewing's Creek, Gerangamete, Barwon Downs, and Yaugher. On 21 September 1891, four stations were renamed: Arlett's Corner became Pennyroyal, Dewing's Creek became Barwon Downs, Barwon Downs became Yaugher, and Yaugher became Forrest. In the 1940 timetable, trains stopped at the same eight stations as in September 1891, with the train taking fifty minutes to get from Forrest to Birregurra. The line closed in March 1957.

The Forrest railway was a key means of transport for the Otway Ranges timber and coal industries. Prior to the opening of the Great Ocean Road, the Forrest railway, with connecting coaches at Deans Marsh, was also the primary means of reaching the coastal resort town of Lorne.

By 1896 a single train set was used for daily return trips Beeac-Colac-Birregurra-Forrest-Birregurra-Irrewarra-Beeac. This allowed connections with the Melbourne Mixed trains at Colac and Birregurra in the mornings, and at Birregurra and Irrewarra in the afternoons. In 1905 the schedule had changed to two daily Beeac trips, so the Forrest train used its own consist that ran from Geelong as a goods train, doing a return Mixed service to Forrest then back to Geelong as a Mixed to connect with a train from there to Melbourne. This was fairly short-lived, with the combined Beeac and Forrest service resuming by 1908, though with different operating hours so multiple crews would have been required. The two lines were functionally severed again when the line from Beeac was extended through Cressy to Ballarat, so the Forrest line reverted to a Geelong-based schedule. In 1928 the schedule was altered again to connect with the Geelong Flyer service, and by 1931 the engine was worked from and to Colac using a carriage and van based at Birregurra; at this time the Mixed ran four days per week. In 1937 the Mixed was replaced with a daily (Sundays excepted) Passenger Mail Motor which operated through to 1952, while the goods train ran three days per week more or less to the schedule of the former Mixed train until the line closed in 1957.

An extension of the line from Forrest to Barramunga was discussed from the 1890s until at least the 1910s. In 1904, it initially received the support of the Parliamentary Standing Committee on Railways but, following an unfavourable report from an officer of the Railways Department, it did not proceed. Local campaigns for the extension continued for several years thereafter, but were unsuccessful.

The Tiger Rail Trail is a walking and cycling track which follows a section of the alignment of the former Forrest line.
