= Paradox Falls =

Waterfall in Victoria, Australia

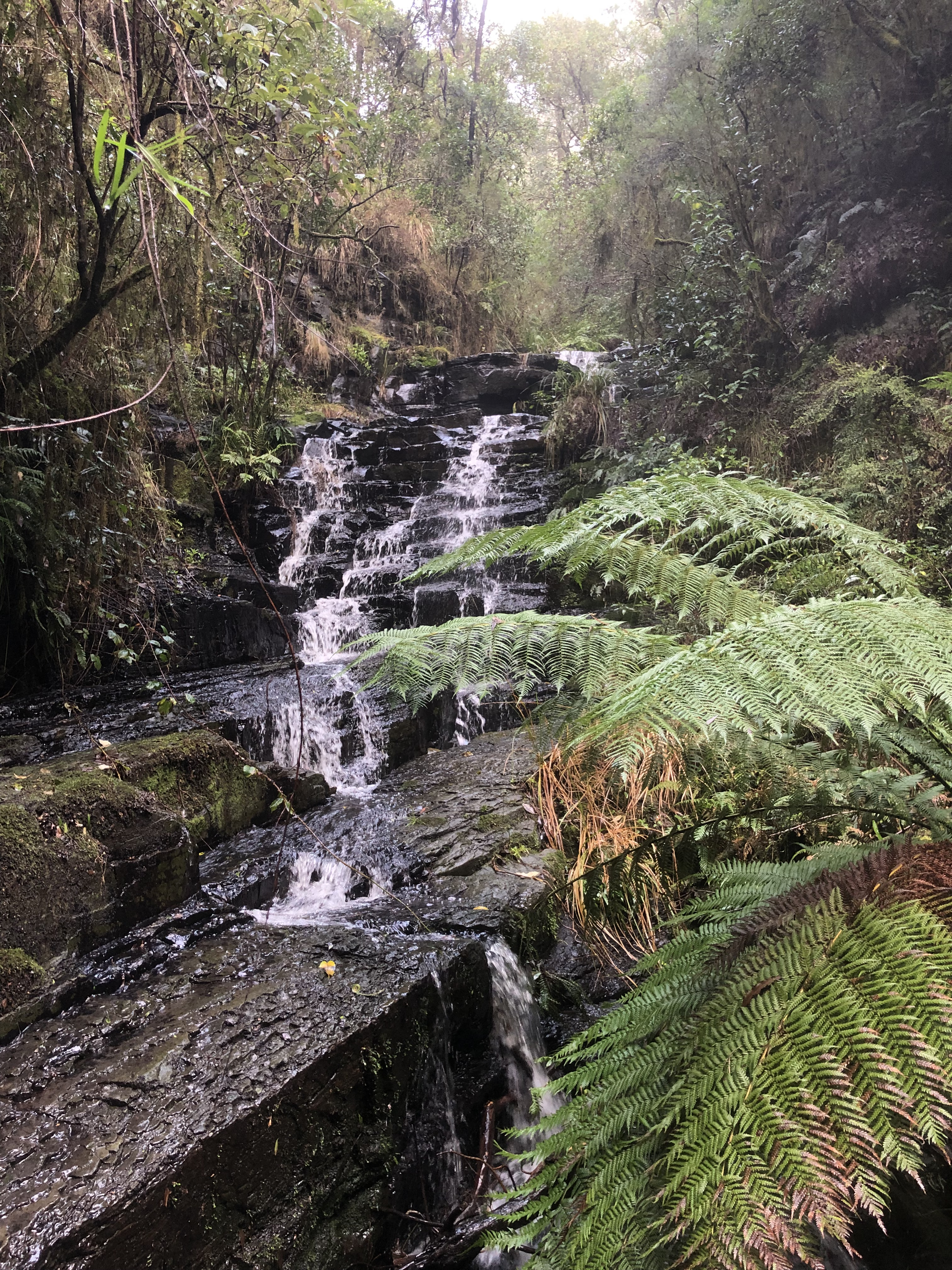
- Paradox Falls

- Location within Victoria
- Location: Pennyroyal, Victoria, Australia
- Coordinates: 38°27′50″S 143°53′38″E
- Type: Plunge
- Total height: 9.99 m (32.8 ft)
- Number of drops: 2
- Watercourse: Tributary of Acquila Creek

Paradox Falls is a waterfall in the Otway Ranges, within the locality of Pennyroyal, Victoria, Australia. The waterfall consists of two tiers measuring approximately 6.5 metres and 3.49 metres, giving it a total height of about 9.99 metres.

== History ==
Paradox Falls received its name due to a navigational and identification error during its documentation by waterfall researcher Anthony Car. While attempting to locate the nearby Acquila Falls, Car had entered the published coordinates into his GPS and followed them to the indicated location. Upon reaching the waterfall, he took a photo. At a later stage he compared his photograph with an image of Acquila Falls in the book 250 Victorian Waterfalls, and had noticed that the waterfall he had photographed did not match the published image. After contacting Ian Wacey, co-author of the book, it was determined that while Wacey had the correct photograph of Acquila Falls, the published coordinates were incorrect and instead led to the separate waterfall that Car had visited.

The discrepancy between the photograph and location resulted in the waterfall being named Paradox Falls.

== See also ==
- Pennyroyal Falls
- Dunse Falls
- Acquila Falls
