= Benwerrin =

- Town
- Coordinates: 38°29′03″S 143°54′33″E
- Country: Australia
- State: Victoria
- LGA: Surf Coast Shire
- Location: 52 km (32 mi) SW of Geelong; 117 km (73 mi) SW of Melbourne

Government
  - State electorate: Polwarth
  - Federal division: Wannon

Population
  - Total: 9 (SAL 2021)
- Postcode: 3235
Localities around Benwerrin
Murroon	Pennyroyal and Deans Marsh	Boonah
Barwon Downs	Benwerrin	Big Hill
Barwon Downs	Lorne	Lorne

Benwerrin is a locality in Surf Coast Shire, Victoria, Australia.

The original 1840s main track to Lorne passed through Benwerrin. The track was resurfaced with bluestone in 1877, but eventually bypassed for an easier alignment to the coast. Some remnants of the former track remain today, and are listed on the Surf Coast Shire's heritage inventory. Benwerrin Post Office opened on 1 November 1886 and closed on 30 June 1927.

Coal was found at Benwerrin in 1895, when mining began there on a small scale. The Great Western Coal Company was formed in 1897, and it initially carried the coal to Deans Marsh railway station by wagon. A second company was formed to build a tramway to the Forrest railway line in September 1898, but it went into liquidation by March 1899. The Great Western Colliery Company, which had taken over the mine, completed the tramway and it opened in 1893. The mine and tramway went into liquidation in December 1903; the tramway locomotive was sold in 1904 and the tramway lifted in 1905. The mine reopened in 1942 before closing for good in 1949, and little trace remains of the former tramway reservation.

Sawmilling in the area began in the 1870s and declined in the 1960s and 1970s. One mill which had survived the initial decline of the industry, Babington's Mill, closed in 1989 but reopened in 1991 as an open-air museum, the Babington's Benwerrin Sawmill Museum and Animal Nursery. The sawmill had been established in 1936 and survived the closure of many local mills in the industry by selling pulp and firewood before its eventual closure. Its reopening in 1991 by owner Erwin Babington saw the sawmill operate largely for tourist purposes, as both an indoor and outdoor museum with working demonstrations and guided tours. The museum no longer operates, but the site is locally heritage listed for its status as one of the few surviving mills in the area, and for its relatively intact complex of residential and industrial buildings and machinery.

Both the coal and timber industries at Benwerrin had to contend with the difficulties of transporting their product by wagon across the terrain of the Otway Ranges to the nearest railway station at Deans Marsh on the Forrest railway line. The coal mine attempted to address this by building a tramway, but following the failure of the mine and tramway in 1903, a movement began to extend another Otway Ranges railway, the Wensleydale railway line, to Benwerrin. Its advocates argued that it would open up excellent new timber country and revitalise the dormant coal industry. They also argued that it would allow for better tourist access to the town of Lorne, for which a through line was uneconomical due to the terrain. The railway authorities remained unconvinced that the extension to the already-failing Wensleydale line would pay for itself. While calls for the line to be extended to Benwerrin continued until at least 1919, it never occurred, and the Wensleydale line eventually closed in 1948.

The vast majority of the locality is today located within the Great Otway National Park and Otway Forest Park. The Deans Marsh-Lorne Road and the Benwerrin-Mount Sabine Road are the only two roads through the area. It includes sections of the Erskine River and the Stony Creek; the well-known Erskine Falls in neighbouring Lorne lie close to the border with Benwerrin.
