= Birregurra =

- Town
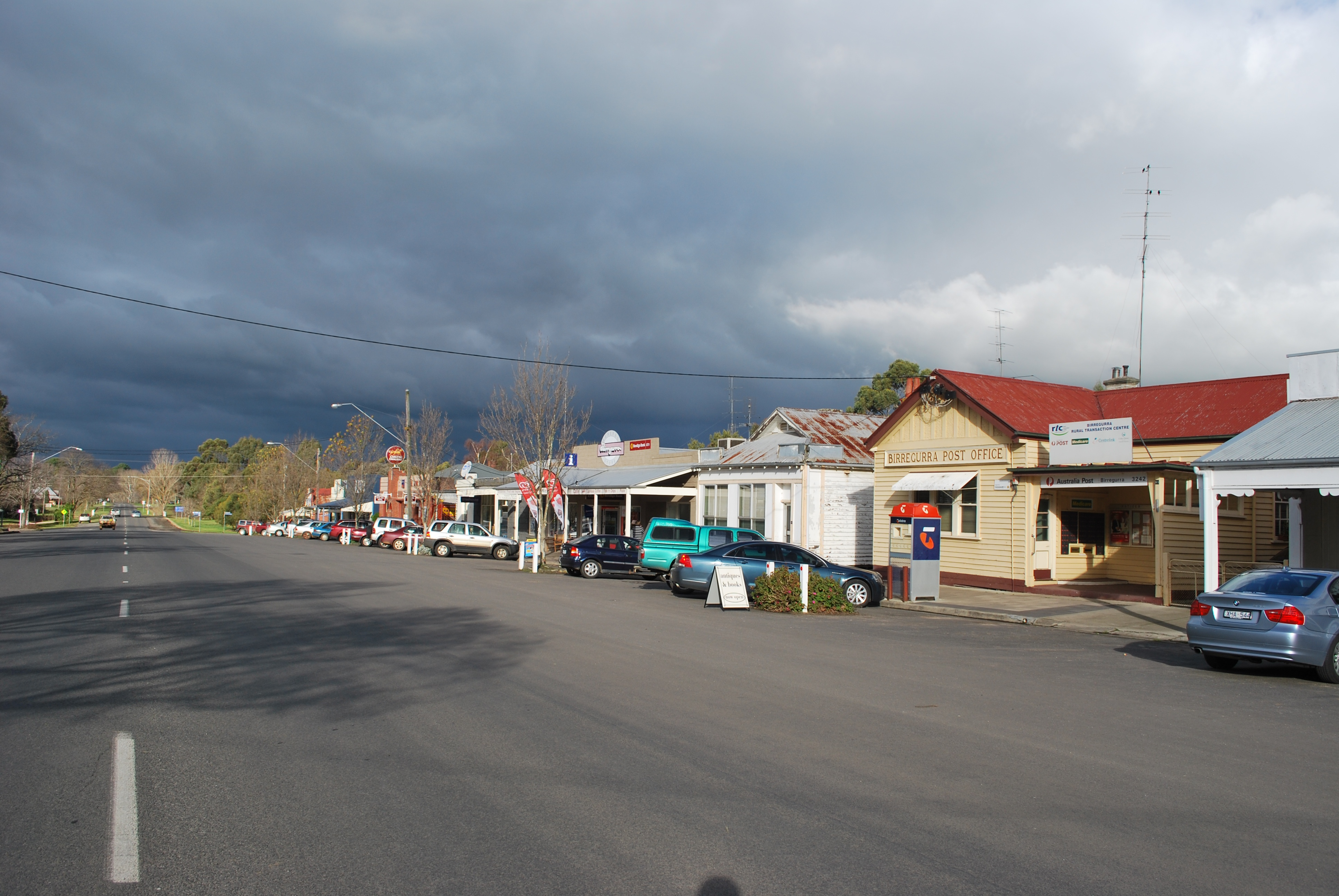
- Main street

- Coordinates: 38°20′0″S 143°47′0″E
- Country: Australia
- State: Victoria
- LGA: Colac Otway Shire
- Location: 136 km (85 mi) SW of Melbourne; 64 km (40 mi) W of Geelong; 21 km (13 mi) E of Colac

Government
  - State electorate: Polwarth
  - Federal division: Wannon

Population
  - Total: 942 (2021 census)
- Postcode: 3242
Localities around Birregurra
Ombersley	Ombersley	Winchelsea
Warncoort	Birregurra	Winchelsea South
Yeodene	Murroon; Whoorel	Deans Marsh; Bambra

Birregurra (sometimes colloquially known as Birre), is a town in Colac Otway Shire, Victoria, Australia, approximately 130 kilometres (81 mi) south-west of Melbourne. At the 2021 census, it had a population of 942.

The name comes from an Aboriginal word thought to mean "kangaroo camp". The town is on Gulidjan Country.

== History ==
In 1839, Wesleyan missionaries and the Victorian colonial government established the Buntingdale Aboriginal Mission in the area – Victoria's first Aboriginal mission.

A post office opened in the area on 1 October 1858 and was renamed Mount Gellibrand in 1894, a few days before another nearby office was opened as Birregurra.

Christ Church, the town's Anglican church, opened in 1871.

== Railway ==
The railway through the town opened in 1877, as part of the line to the south-west of the state. A branch line to Forrest, which opened in 1891 and closed in 1957, junctioned with the main line at Birregurra.

The local railway station is served by V/Line passenger services on the Warrnambool line.

== Sport ==
Birregurra has an Australian Rules football team competing in the Colac & District Football League.

Birregurra also has a golf club.

== Education ==
The town has a primary school which had 92 students as of 2023, and is located on Beal Street.

== Businesses ==
The town has cafes, a local providore showcasing local produce, the Royal Mail Hotel, a general store, gift shops and a hairdresser.

Birregurra is home to the Brae restaurant, which was number 44 in The World's 50 Best Restaurants in 2017.

== Local events ==
Birregurra is host to the Birregurra Festival and Art Show, which starts on the second full weekend of October each year.

A produce market is held on the second Sunday of each month from November to April, where local vendors sell cakes, jewellery, plants, fresh fruit and vegetables, wine, arts and crafts. Organisers hold a barbecue for patrons of the market and all proceeds return to the community.

Birregurra was the filming location for the fictional Victorian town of Haven Bay in season 1 of the Channel 10 television series The Henderson Kids.

== Notable people ==
- Mary Glowrey (1887–1957) was an Australian-born and educated doctor, who spent 37 years in India, where she set up healthcare facilities.
- Firth McCallum (1872–1910) was an Australian rules footballer with Geelong Football Club and was named among the top players of the 1899 VFL season.
- Lewis Mellican (1996–) is an Australian Rules football player with The Sydney Swans from 2017–current.

== See also ==
- Mooleric
