= Dunse Falls =

Waterfall in Victoria, Australia

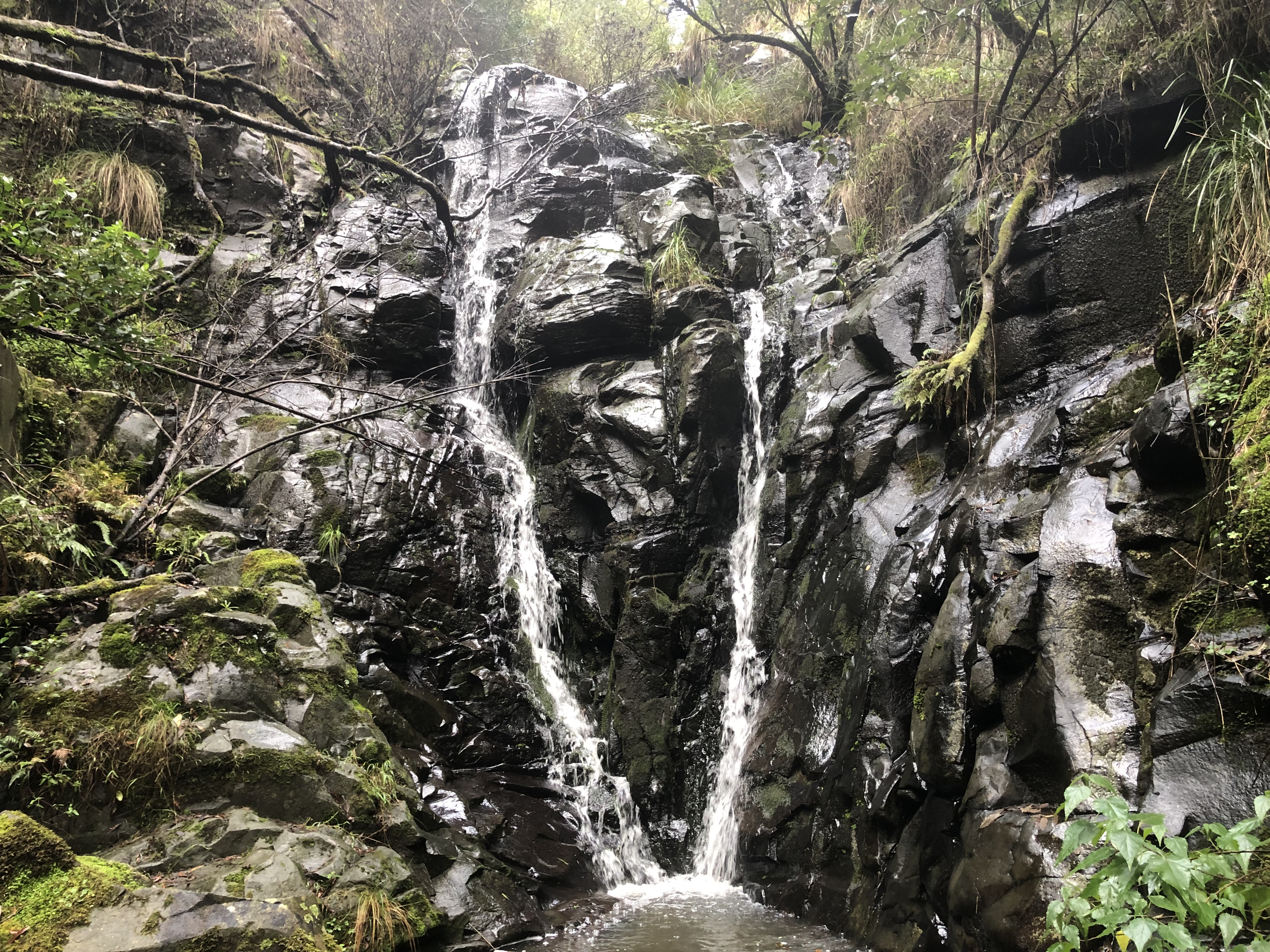
- Dunse Falls

- Location within Victoria
- Location: Pennyroyal, Victoria, Australia
- Coordinates: 38°27′41″S 143°53′26″E
- Type: Plunge
- Total height: 11.49 m (37.7 ft)
- Number of drops: 2
- Watercourse: Tributary of Acquila Creek

Dunse Falls is a waterfall on a tributary of Aquila Creek in the locality of Pennyroyal, within the Otway Ranges, Victoria, Australia. The waterfall consists of two tiers measuring approximately 2.31 metres and 9.18 metres, giving it a total height of 11.49 metres.

== History ==
Dunse Falls is named after Andrew Dunse, an early European settler and pioneer of the Pennyroyal region. He was born in Edinburgh, Midlothian, Scotland, on 20 July 1841. In 1853, at the age of 12, he emigrated to Australia with his parents, arriving at Geelong during the early years of European settlement in the colony of Victoria. Dunse established Glengowrie Farm, where he cultivated hops and berries. He died on 15 October 1921.

== See also ==
- Acquila Falls
- Pennyroyal Falls
