= Pennyroyal, Victoria =

Pennyroyal Victoria
- Coordinates: 38°26′35″S 143°52′34″E
- Population: 110 (SAL 2021)
- Postcode(s): 3235
- Location: 54 km (34 mi) SW of Geelong; 120 km (75 mi) SW of Melbourne
- LGA(s): Surf Coast Shire; Shire of Colac Otway
- State electorate(s): Polwarth
- Federal division(s): Wannon
Suburbs around Pennyroyal:
Murroon	Deans Marsh	Deans Marsh
Murroon	Pennyroyal	Deans Marsh; Boonah
Murroon	Benwerrin	Benwerrin

Pennyroyal is a locality in Victoria, Australia. Most of the locality is situated in the Surf Coast Shire; a small section is situated in the Shire of Colac Otway. In the 2016 census, Pennyroyal had a population of 86.

Pennyroyal is a small rural locality; while it once had a post office, church, school, and railway station for carting local produce, they have long since closed. Pennyroyal Creek Post Office opened on 15 August 1887 and closed on 14 January 1955. St Michael's Church of England opened in 1885 and closed in 1950. Penny Royal Creek State School (No. 1204) opened in 1873, moved to a new site in 1916, and closed in 1982.

The Birregurra-Forrest railway line opened in 1891. A station called "Arlett's Corner" opened with the line and was renamed Pennyroyal in September of that year. The line closed in 1957. The Pennyroyal Public Hall opened in 1912, and survives to the present day.

Pennyroyal is located in a lush valley, and is now known for tourism and dairy and berry farming. It has two berry farms which are open to the public. Each has a seasonal cafe, one also provides B&B accommodation, and there are a number of holiday cottages, conference centres and camps in the area. The Penny Royal Creek Bushland Reserve is located in Pennyroyal, and the locality adjoins the Otway Forest Park and Great Otway National Park.
