= Barwon River (Victoria) =

Perennial river in Victoria, Australia

Barwon Barwon River (East Branch), Barwon River (West Branch)
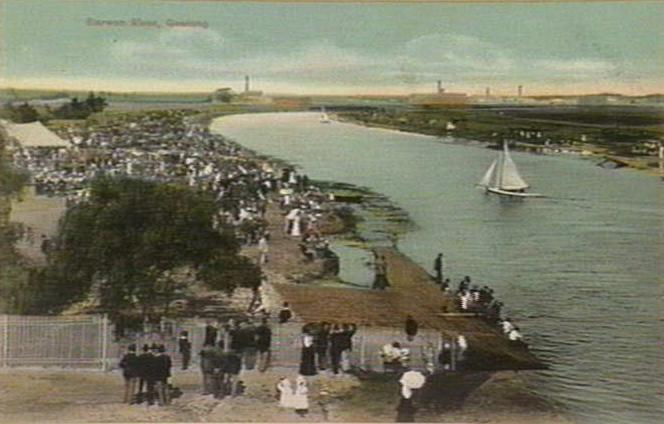
- The Barwon River at Geelong, 1907

- Location of the Barwon River mouth in Victoria
- Etymology: Aboriginal: barwon, meaning "magpie", or "great wide".
- Native name: Worragong (Wathawurrung); Nellemengobeet (Wathawurrung); Barrwang (Wathawurrung)

Location
- Country: Australia
- State: Victoria
- Region: South East Coastal Plain (IBRA), The Otways, Bellarine Peninsula
- Local government area: Surf Coast Shire
- Townships: Winchelsea, Inverleigh, Greater Geelong, Barwon Heads

Physical characteristics
- Source: Otway Ranges
  - location: south of Birregurra
  - elevation: 295 m (968 ft)
- Source confluence: East and West Branches of the Barwon River
  - coordinates: 38°25′20″S 143°44′26″E
  - elevation: 120 m (390 ft)
- Mouth: Bass Strait
  - location: Barwon Heads
  - coordinates: 38°17′12″S 144°29′59″E
  - elevation: 0 m (0 ft)
- Length: 160 km (99 mi)
- Basin size: 8,590 km^{2} (3,320 sq mi)
- Discharge
  - location: Near mouth
  - average: 62.6 m^{3}/s (1,980 GL/a)

Basin features
- River system: Corangamite catchment
- Tributaries
  - left: Boundary Creek (Barwon), Atkin Creek, Birregurra Creek, Warrambine Creek, Leigh River, Sandy Creek (Barwon), Moorabool River
  - right: Matthews Creek, Deans Marsh Creek, Brickmakers Creek, Retreat Creek, Scrubby Creek
- Waterfalls: Buckley Falls

The Barwon River is a perennial river of the Corangamite catchment, in The Otways and the Bellarine Peninsula regions of the Australian state of Victoria.

== Location and features ==
Fed by the confluence of the East and West Branches of the river, the Barwon River rises in the Otway Ranges and flows generally north by east and then east, joined by thirteen tributaries including the Leigh and Moorabool rivers and flowing through Lake Connewarre, before reaching its mouth and emptying into Bass Strait at Barwon Heads. The river flows adjacent to the settlement of Winchelsea and Greater Geelong. The estuarine section of the river forms part of the Port Phillip Bay (Western Shoreline) and Bellarine Peninsula Ramsar Site as a wetland of international importance, as well as of the Bellarine Wetlands Important Bird Area. From its highest point including its source confluence, the river descends 295 metres (968 ft) over its 160-kilometre (99 mi) course.

The river is crossed by a number of bridges in Geelong. Of particular note is the unusual one-lane truss bridge in Newtown, Geelong. The "Breakwater" in East Geelong was constructed by Foster Fyans to supply drinking water.

Water from the river feeds agriculture and industry. The river is a popular recreation spot for Geelong, with parklands such as Balyang Sanctuary along the banks, and sees use by water skiers and rowing regattas such as Head of the River.

== Etymology ==
The river's name is derived from the Wadawurrung word parrwang, meaning either "magpie" or "great wide".

In the Aboriginal Wathawurrung language the names for the river are Worragong, with no clearly defined meaning, Nellemengobeet, meaning "lagoon at mouth", and Barrwang, meaning "magpie".

The Boonwurrung group, who occupied the Geelong region before the Wathawurrung, called the river Nooarn, which is believed to have meant "great eel", for the giant eel that was believed to have lived in it.

== Towns ==
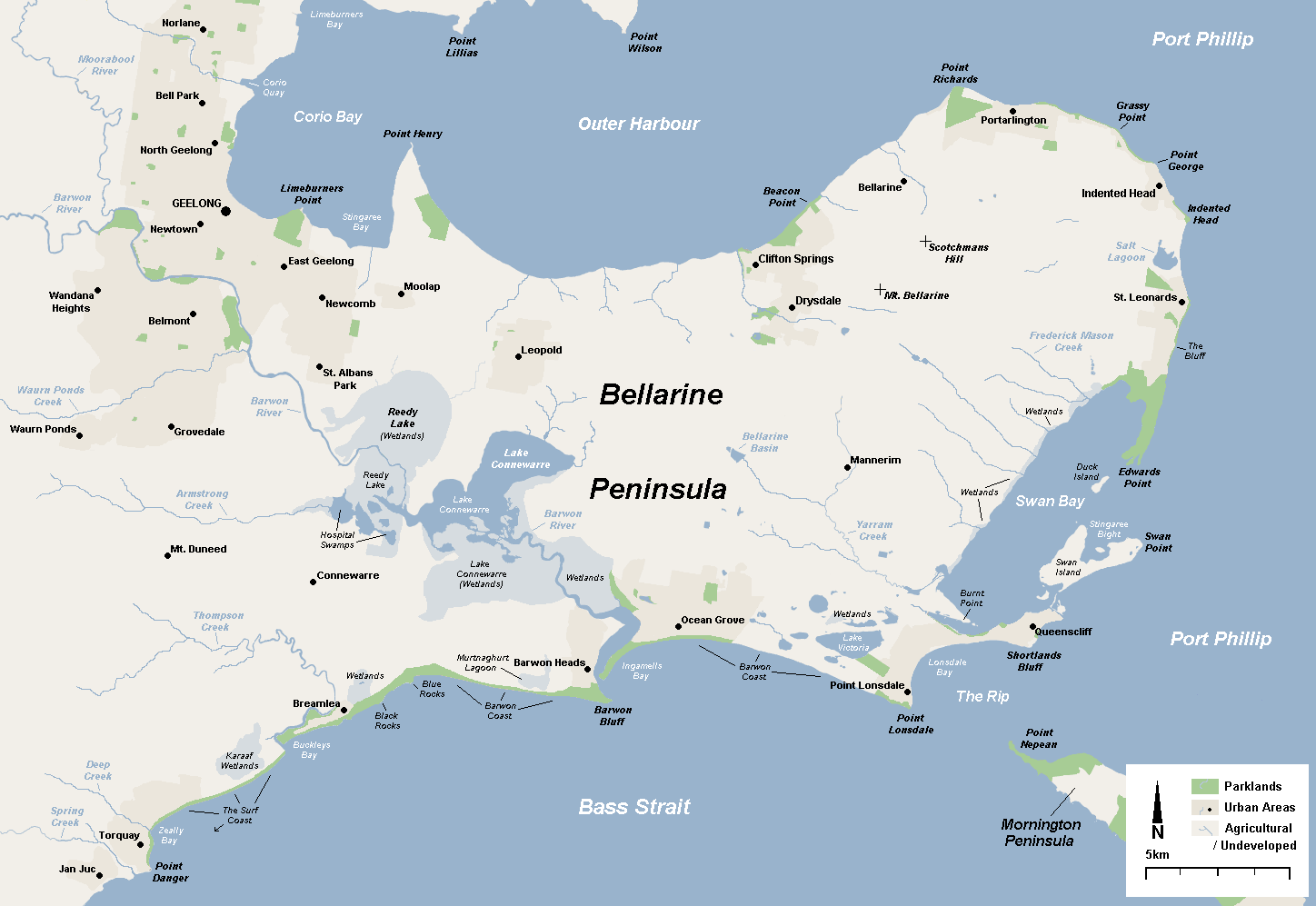
Map of the Bellarine Peninsula showing the Barwon River as it enters Bass Strait

Towns the river flows through include:

- Forrest
- Barwon Downs
- Birregurra
- Winchelsea
- Inverleigh
- Geelong
- Ocean Grove
- Barwon Heads

== Dams and weirs ==
Ordered upstream to downstream:

=== West Barwon Dam ===
The West Barwon Dam was constructed near Forrest in 1965 by what is now Barwon Water. The dam is now the major water supply for Geelong.

=== Baums Weir ===
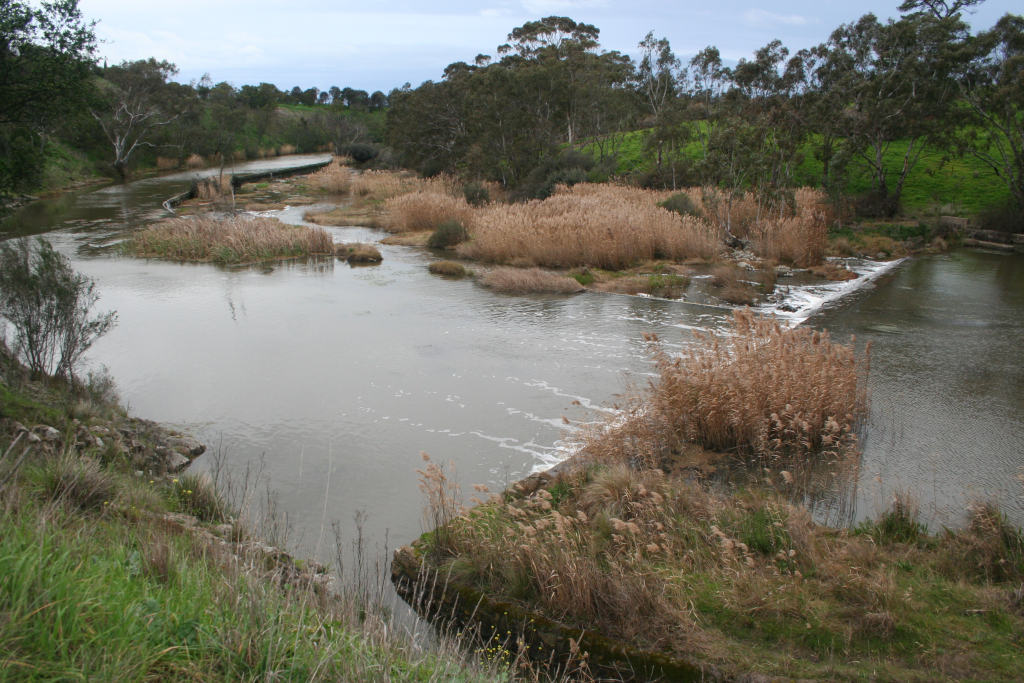
Baums Weir looking downstream, 2007

Baums Weir was constructed to channel water from the river along a mill race to a paper mill, built in the late 1870s and located above Buckleys Falls.

=== Buckley Falls ===
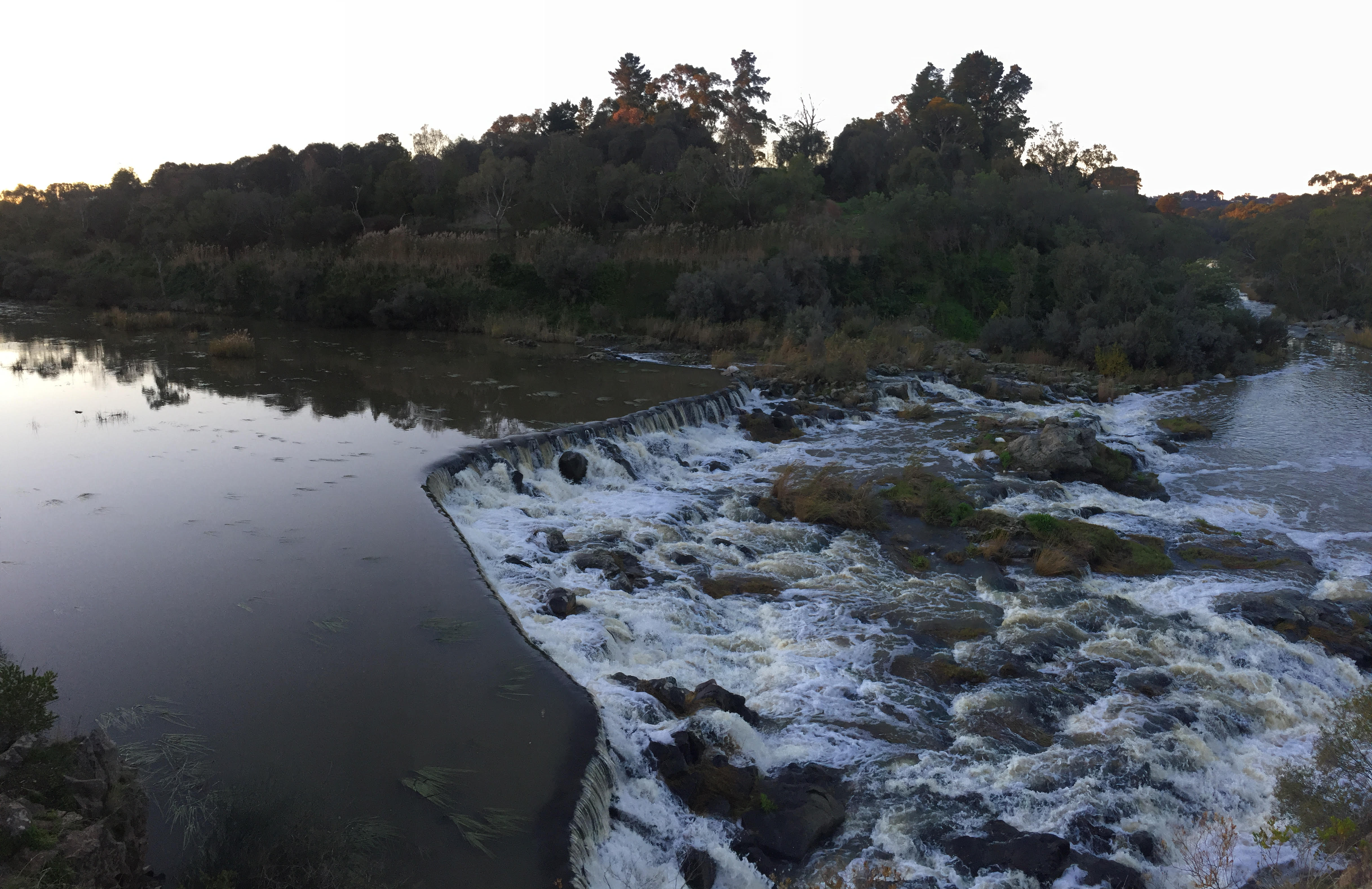
The weir above Buckleys Falls, 2019

Buckley Falls is located between Highton and Fyansford. A weir and water race was built above the falls in 1876 to provide power for the Fyansford Paper Mill. The falls were named by John Helder Wedge after escaped convict William Buckley, who lived in the area with Aborigines for 32 years from 1803.

=== The Breakwater ===
The Breakwater is located in the Geelong suburb of the same name. Originally built to prevent salt water moving upstream, it now keeps the river level through Geelong constant. A ford on top of it also became an important road crossing point until it was replaced in 2012 by a bridge about 350m upstream. Construction on the weir started in late 1838 under Captain Foster Fyans and was completed by May 1840. Built by convicts, the weir failed in flood in 1844, not being fully rebuilt until 1849. Little changed to the breakwater until it was rebuilt by the Country Roads Board for modern traffic in the mid-1960s.

=== Barrage ===
A second weir was built over the Barwon River further downstream. Located near where the river enters Lake Connewarre, the barrage again keeps water levels constant upstream for waterskiers, and prevents saltwater moving upstream into Reedy Lake.

== Bridges ==
Ordered upstream to downstream:

=== Barwon River Bridge ===
The Barwon River Bridge at Winchelsea was erected in 1867 for the Council of the Shire of Winchelsea, replacing an earlier timber structure of 1849. The three span arch structure was built of bluestone by James Sinclair at a cost of £4,602 and officially opened by Prince Alfred, Duke of Edinburgh, on 3 December 1867. The Barwon River Bridge is the third structure erected at this historic crossing place and has since 1867 provided an important link with Geelong and the Western District. This finely proportioned masonry arch bridge, one of the most impressive stone structures in Victoria, has a notable association with Prince Alfred, Duke of Edinburgh, the three times royal visitor to nearby 'Barwon Park' mansion. The Barwon River Bridge, which is still in regular use, has recently been rehabilitated. A new reinforced concrete structure, located beside the bluestone bridge, partly relieves the heavy traffic loads.

=== Pollocksford Bridge ===
The single-lane bridge, located in Gnarwarre, carries Pollocksford Road over the river.

The original bridge, consisting of four bluestone piers supporting a timber superstructure, was constructed in the 1850s. Reconstruction of the bridge began in the 1910s, which replaced the timber superstructure with a new structure made of iron and steel, but retained the original bluestone piers. The reconstructed bridge was opened on 14 February 1921 by Victorian Premier Harry Lawson.

=== Geoff Thom Bridge ===
The twin 110-metre (360 ft) bridges, opened on 15 June 2009, carries the four-lane Geelong Ring Road over the river. The bridge is named after Geoffrey Thom, former member of the Victorian Legislative Council.

=== Queens Bridge ===
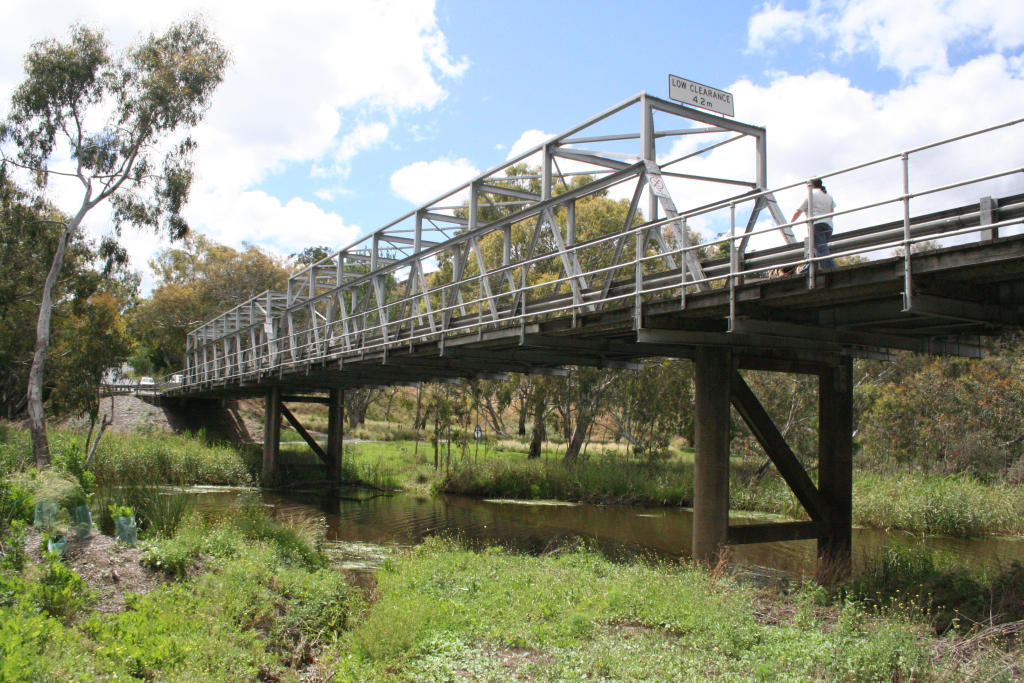
The single-lane Queens Park Bridge, 2007

The single-lane Queens Bridge carries Queens Park Road, which links Highton and Newtown. The location was originally the site of a punt, with a wooden cattle crossing being provided in 1861. Those crossing the bridge were charged a toll. The bridge collapsed in the 1870 flood, and a new wooden bridge opened in 1872. The toll ended 1877. The bridge was wrecked by the 1909 flood, but was rebuilt. The current one-lane through truss steel bridge was opened in 1930. A water main and footpath were added on one side in 1963, and the height and deck have been modified in later years.

=== Princes Bridge ===
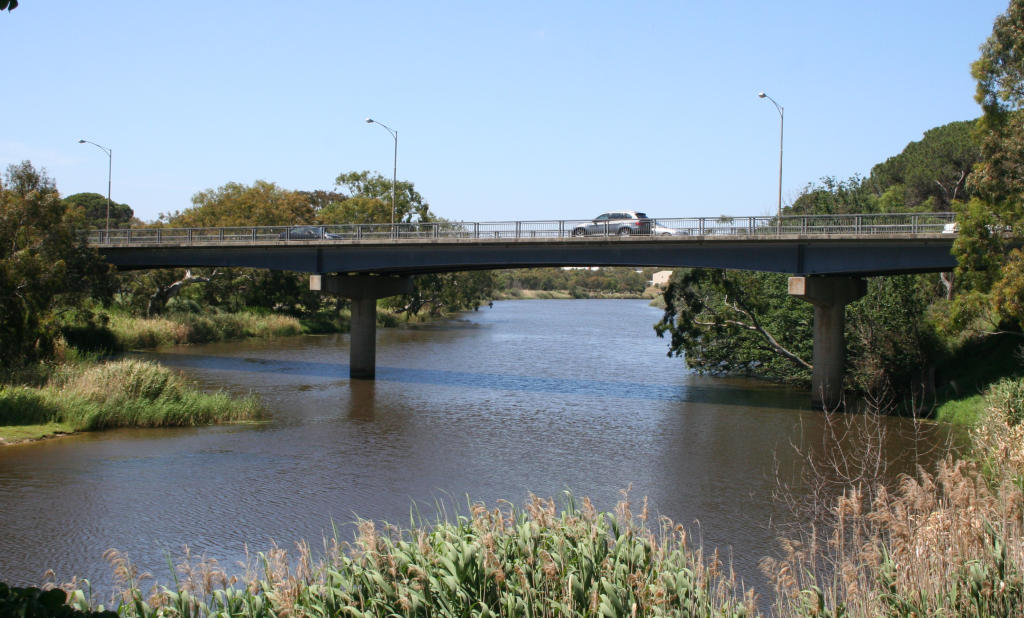
The current Princes Bridge, 2007

The two-lane Princes Bridge carries Shannon Avenue between Belmont and Newtown. It is the third bridge on the site, all of which have been named after Prince Albert, the consort of Queen Victoria. A bridge was first proposed for the site in the 1850s as a second Barwon crossing in Geelong. At the time many wanted the bridge to be located at end of Pakington Street, but they were defeated. The wooden Prince Albert Bridge was constructed by the City of Newtown in 1861, named after Prince Albert, who had died that year.

The bridge was originally not tolled, and provided competition for the Barwon Bridge on Moorabool Street, which was tolled by the South Barwon Shire. As a result, the shire erected a fence across new bridge to prevent people from using it, but the fence was removed several times by an unknown party, which led to a guard being stationed there. At the same time, the Newtown and Chilwell Council decided to erect its own toll gate at the new bridge, so the South Barwon council retaliated by erecting a "check toll" gate on its side of the river. The Newtown and Chilwell councillors refused to pay the toll, which remained for another year.

With the bridge becoming dilapidated, a tender accepted in June 1888 for the construction of a replacement. Provided with separated lanes, the new wooden bridge was opened on 31 May 1889. In 1959, extensive repairs were carried out to handle much heavier traffic from the expansion of Highton. That proved to be a short-term measure, and in June 1965 the wooden bridge was replaced by current steel girder bridge, which is upstream of older bridges. To avoid flooding, the new bridge was connected to Shannon Avenue by a high level embankment, which skirts what became Balyang Sanctuary in 1973.

=== McIntyre Bridge ===
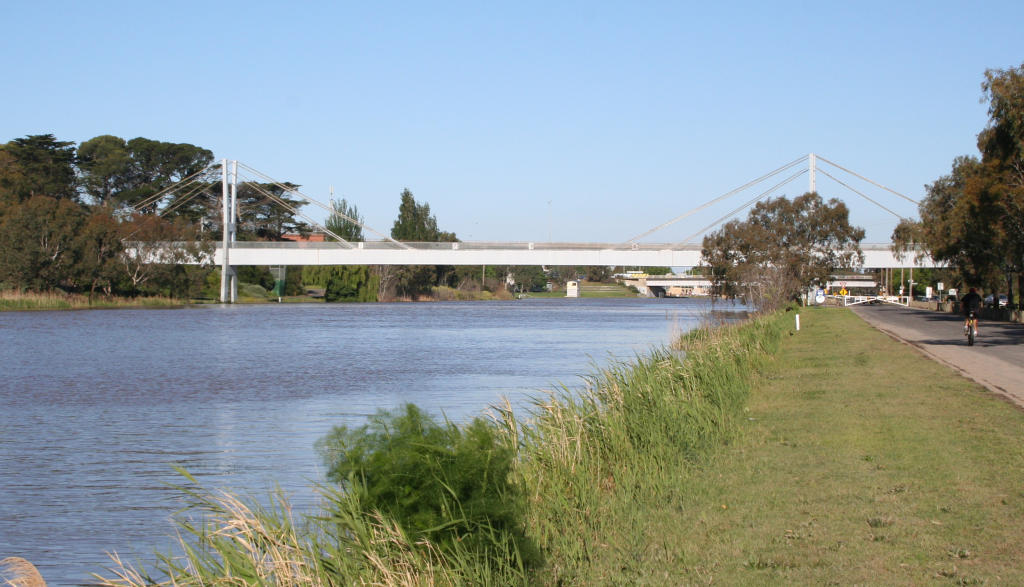
The cable-stayed McIntyre sewer aqueduct and footbridge, 2007

The 192-metre (630 ft) long McIntyre Bridge is located upstream of the James Harrison Bridge, and is a post-tensioned, pre-stressed stayed girder bridge, carrying a sewer pipe with a concrete pedestrian walkway above. Constructed in 1967 to carry sewage from Geelong to the ocean outfall at Black Rock, the bridge provided relief for the 1916 sewer aqueduct further downstream. It was designed by Jan van der Molen, and was one of the first in Australia to use computer engineering in the design process.

=== James Harrison Bridge ===
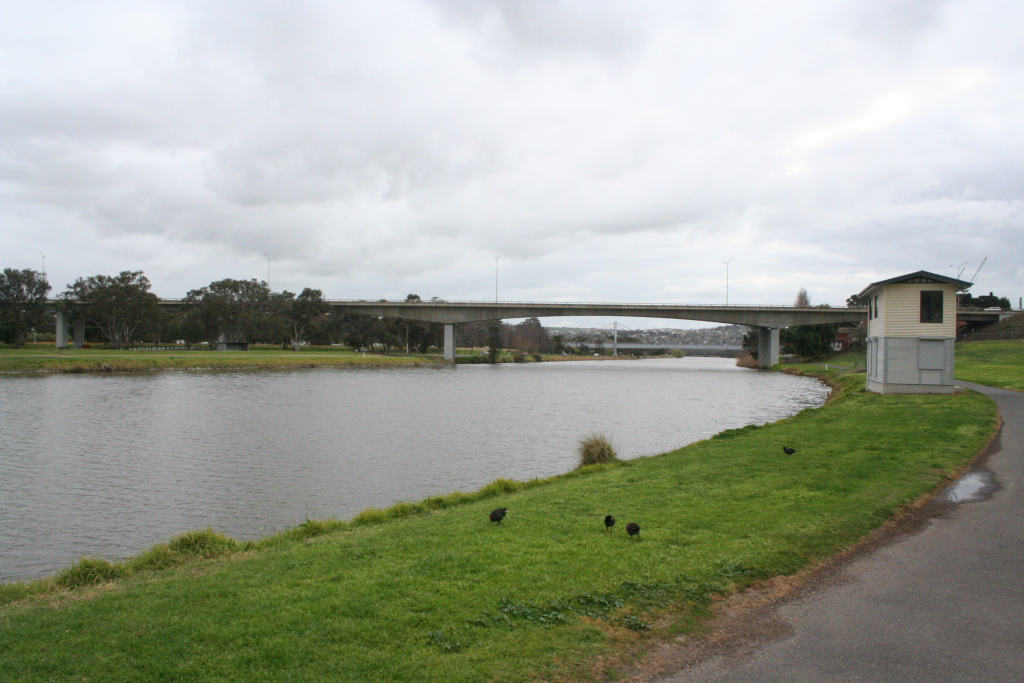
James Harrison Bridge, 2007

The four-lane, 82-metre James Harrison Bridge carries the Princes Highway through Geelong. Construction started in 1988 and was completed in September 1990, removing heavy through traffic from the main Belmont shopping centre. Consisting of twin parallel two lane bridges, The main river span is of concrete cantilever design, with a number of smaller concrete box girder spans completing the viaduct to the south. The bridge was named after Geelong engineer and refrigeration pioneer James Harrison.

=== Temporary Barwon Bridge ===
While the Barwon Bridge at Moorabool Street was being rebuilt in the mid-1920s, to allow for the extension of the tram system to Belmont, a temporary wooden bridge was provided as an alternative. It linked the end of Latrobe Terrace on the northern bank with Barrabool Road on the southern bank.

=== Barwon Bridge ===
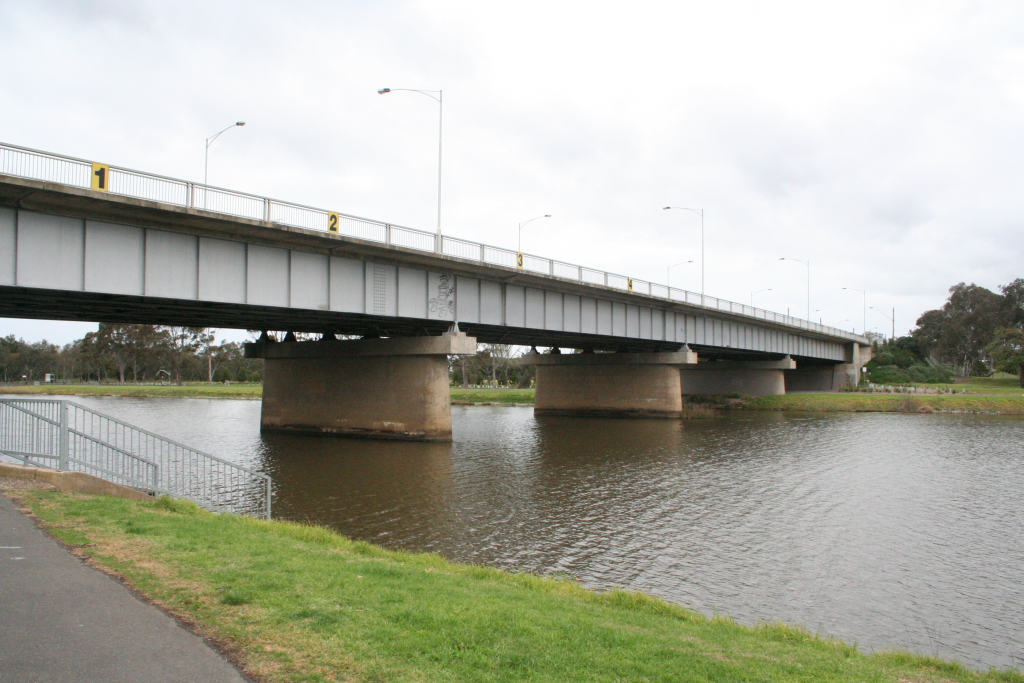
Barwon Bridge from the north bank, 2007

The four-lane Barwon Bridge carries Moorabool Street over the river, and is located on the site of the first Barwon crossing. The first wooden bridge opened early in 1848. Tolled by the South Barwon council, it was swept away in a flood four years later, on 23 May 1852. From December that year a government punt operated at the site. By late 1853, two government punts were used to form a pontoon bridge. It was not until 1859 that a proper iron bridge was opened as a replacement. That bridge was only two lanes wide and was considered too narrow to permit the extension of trams into Belmont, so it was closed and dismantled in 1924.

The new bridge was designed by Country Roads Board engineer Donald Darwin and was opened on 18 August 1926 by Governor of Victoria, Lord Somers. Of concrete and steel girder construction, it was built by Armstrong Whitworth and cost A£73,900 (A$147,800). In 1966, the bridge was widened to four lanes by extending each side of the deck.

=== Breakwater road and rail bridges ===
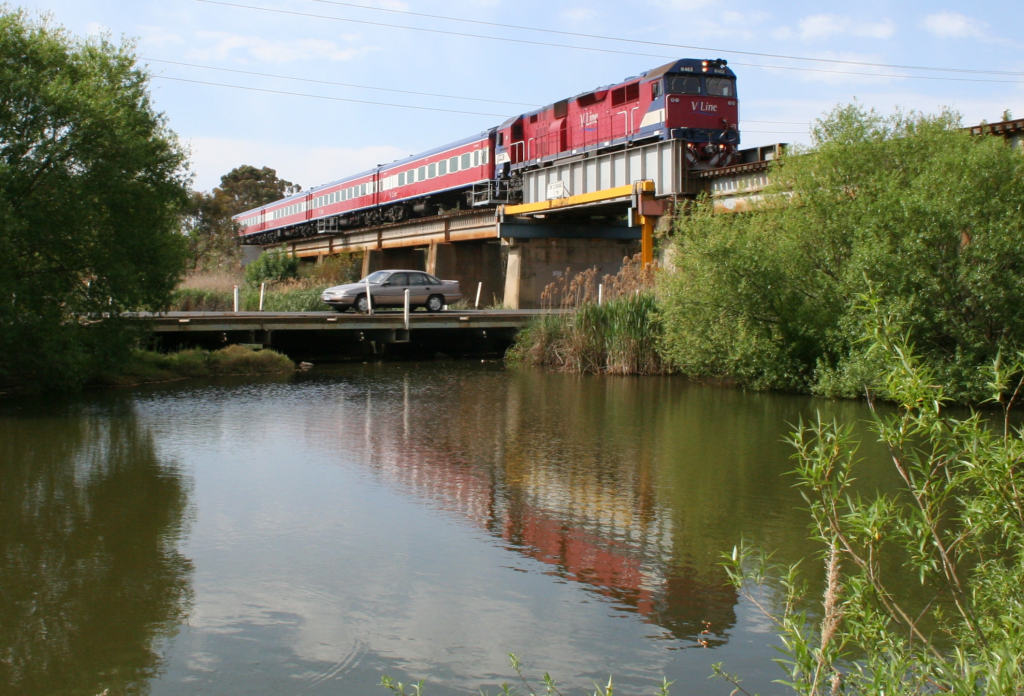
Train crossing the Breakwater Bridge and ford, 2006

The original Breakwater Bridge was a ford running on top of the breakwater. A timber trestle railway bridge was built over the top in 1876 when the Geelong railway line was extended to Winchelsea. That bridge was replaced by a concrete and steel girder bridge in the 1960s, although the remains of the wooden supports of the former bridge are still visible.

A low-level road causeway was built across the breakwater by the Country Roads Board in the mid-1960s. The causeway had a restricted 3.7-metre (12 ft) clearance underneath the railway bridge, and was only about a metre (3 ft) above the water level. As a consequence, a number of trucks became stuck under the railway bridge, and the causeway also required frequent closure due to river flooding. To overcome those problems, VicRoads received planning permission in 2009 to replace the low-level crossing with a new bridge about 350m upstream, at a cost of $63 million, which was completed in mid-2012.

=== Sewer Aqueduct ===
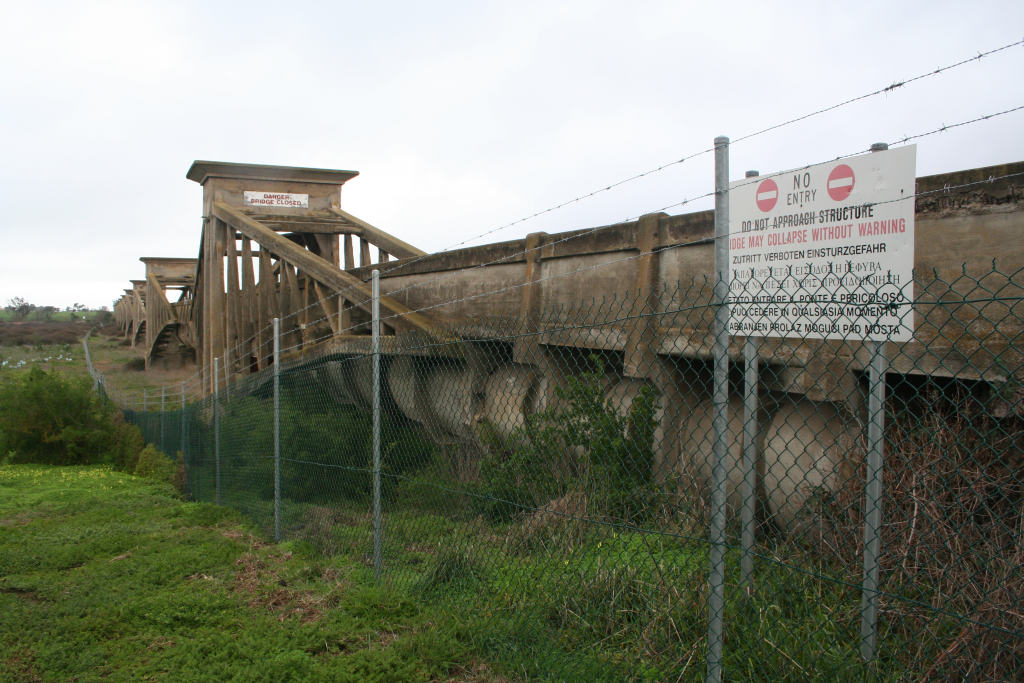
Decommissioned Sewer Aqueduct, 2007

An aqueduct was constructed between 1913 and 1916 to carry sewage across the Barwon River from Geelong to an ocean outfall at Black Rock. Of reinforced concrete construction, it was an unusual design, and is listed on the Victorian National Estate Register. The designer was engineer Edward Giles Stone, who erected many daring structures using reinforced concrete. It has 14 cantilever spans, and has an overall length of more than 760 metres (2,490 ft). The viaduct was decommissioned in 1993. Because of falling debris, caused by the loss of calcium from the concrete used in the construction, the land and river underneath the aqueduct has been fenced to prevent public access. The aqueduct was replaced by a pump-boosted gravity system, including twin siphon pipes under the river.

=== Barwon Heads Bridge ===
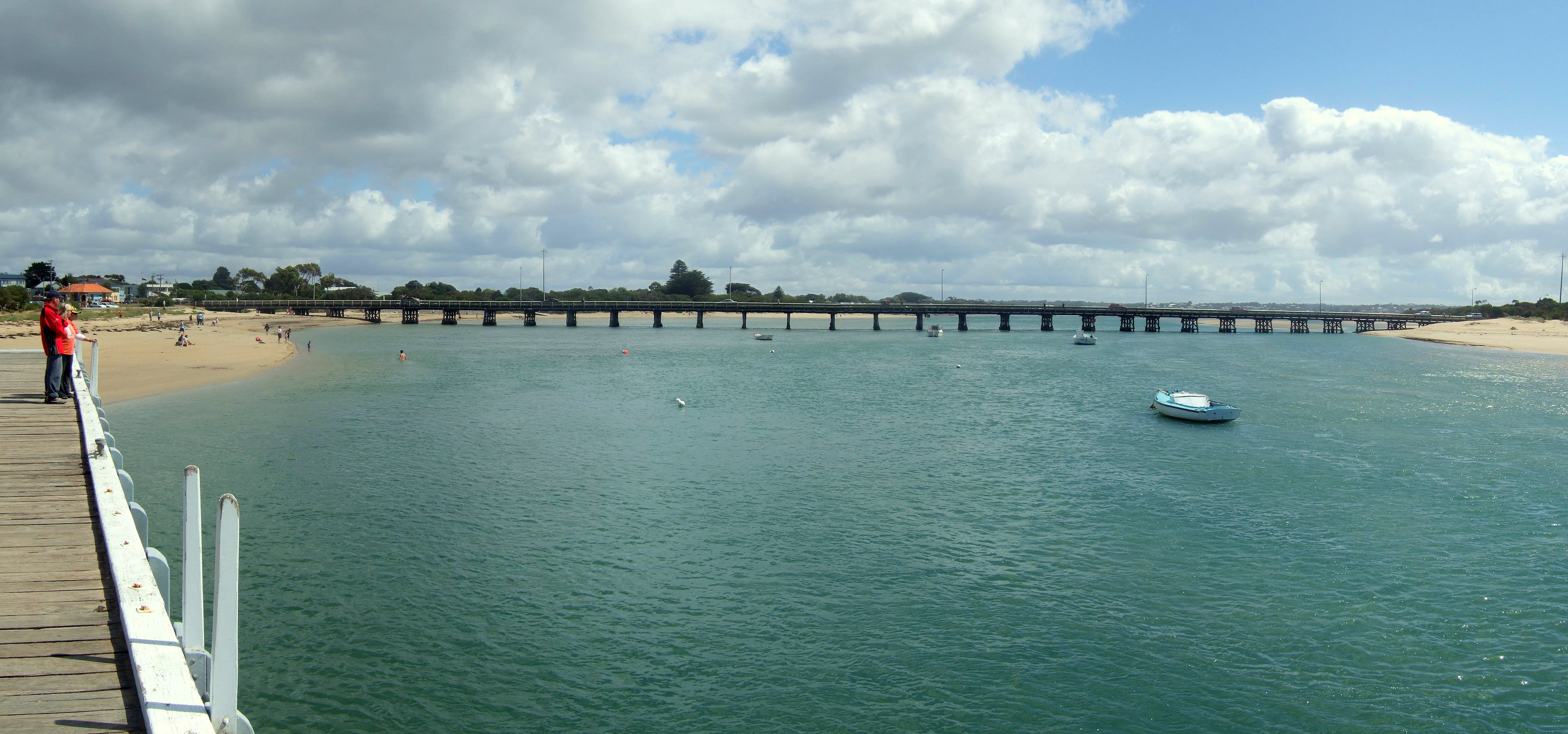
The Barwon Heads Bridge, 2007

The two-lane wooden bridge between Barwon Heads and Ocean Grove was built in 1927. Before this time a ferry ran by Tom Abernathy operated across the mount of the Barwon. The bridge was used in filming the ABC TV series SeaChange. In July 2006, the Government of Victoria shelved plans to replace the heritage-listed bridge with a new one, with plans put forward for an upgraded to be carried out instead. The new Barwon Heads Bridge was constructed in 2010.

== See also ==
- List of rivers of Australia § Victoria
- Barwon Catchment Victoria
