= List of acts of the Parliament of Victoria from 1952 =

This is a list of acts of the Parliament of Victoria, Australia for the year 1952.

== 1952 ==
Short title, or popular name	Citation	Royal assent
Long title
	No. 5620	6 May 1952
An Act to apply out of the Consolidated Revenue the sum of Eleven million nine hundred and eighty thousand one hundred and sixty-four pounds to the service of the year One thousand nine hundred and fifty-two and One thousand nine hundred and fifty-three.
	No. 5621	5 August 1952
An Act to apply out of the Consolidated Revenue the sum of Four million one hundred and thirty thousand nine hundred and sixty-two pounds to the service of the year One thousand nine hundred and fifty-one and One thousand nine hundred and fifty-two.
Lands (Charitable Trusts) Act 1952	No. 5622	12 August 1952
An Act relating to certain Land held on Trust for Charitable Purposes.
Registration of Births Deaths and Marriages Act 1952	No. 5623	12 August 1952
An Act to amend the Registration of Births Deaths and Marriages Acts.
Forests (Exchange of Lands) Act 1952	No. 5624	26 August 1952
An Act to amend the Forests (Exchange of Lands) Act 1943. (Note: Forests (Exchange of Lands) Act 1943 (No. 4960))
Geelong Harbor Trust (Financial) Act 1952	No. 5625	26 August 1952
An Act with respect to the Funds of and the Raising of Loans and the Issue of Debentures and Inscribed Stock by the Geelong Harbor Trust Commissioners, and for other purposes.
Coal Mine Workers Pensions (Amendment) Act 1952	No. 5626	2 September 1952
An Act to amend the Coal Mine Workers Pensions Act 1942. (Note: Coal Mine Workers Pensions Act 1942 (No. 4932))
County Court (Amendment) Act 1952	No. 5627	2 September 1952
An Act to extend the Jurisdiction of County Courts, to amend the County Court Acts, and for other purposes.
Mines (Amendment) Act 1952	No. 5628	2 September 1952
An Act to amend the Mines Acts.
	No. 5629	2 September 1952
An Act to apply out of the Consolidated Revenue the sum of Twelve million five hundred and sixty-three thousand and twenty pounds to the service of the year One thousand nine hundred and fifty-two and One thousand nine hundred and fifty-three.
Teaching Service (Amendment) Act 1952	No. 5630	9 September 1952
An Act to amend Sections Sixty and Sixty-one of the Teaching Service Act 1946. (Note: Teaching Service Act 1946 (No. 5125))
Land (Development Leases) Amendment Act 1952	No. 5631	9 September 1952
An Act to amend Section Three of the Land (Development Leases) Act 1951. (Note: Land (Development Leases) Act 1951 (No. 5585))
Supreme Court (Judges' Cost of Living) Act 1952	No. 5632	9 September 1952
An Act to further amend Section Twelve of the Supreme Court Act 1928. (Note: Supreme Court Act 1928 (19 Geo. V. No. 3783))
Weights and Measures (Amendment) Act 1952	No. 5633	16 September 1952
An Act to amend the Weights and Measures Acts.
Veterinary Surgeons (Foreign Qualification) Act 1952	No. 5634	16 September 1952
An Act to provide for the Registration as Veterinary Surgeons of Certain Persons with Foreign Veterinary Qualifications and for other purposes.
State Electricity Commission (Appliances) Act 1952	No. 5635	16 September 1952
An Act to amend Sections Seven and Eight of the State Electricity Commission Act 1934. (Note: State Electricity Commission Act 1934 (No. 4220))
Prices Regulation (Butter and Cheese) Act 1952	No. 5636	7 October 1952
An Act relating to the Regulation of the Price of Butter and Cheese.
Water Act 1952	No. 5637	7 October 1952
An Act relating to Borrowing by Waterworks Trusts and Local Governing Bodies and to amend the Water Acts, and for other purposes.
Co-operative Housing Societies (Guarantees and Indemnities) Act 1952	No. 5638	7 October 1952
An Act to amend Sections Sixty-one and Sixty-two of the Co-operative Housing Societies Act 1944. (Note: Co-operative Housing Societies Act 1944 (No. 5055))
State Electricity Commission (Borrowing) Act 1952	No. 5639	7 October 1952
An Act to increase the Borrowing Powers of the State Electricity Commission of Victoria.
Country Roads (Amendment) Act 1952	No. 5640	7 October 1952
An Act to amend the Country Roads Act 1928. (Note: Country Roads Act 1928 (19 Geo. V. No. 3662))
Motor Car (Amendment) Act 1952	No. 5641	7 October 1952
An Act to amend Sections Twenty-one, Thirty-one and Ninety-one of the Motor Car Act 1951. (Note: Motor Car Act 1951 (No. 5616))
Land Tax Act 1952	No. 5642	14 October 1952
An Act to declare the rate of Land Tax for the year ending the thirty-first day of December One thousand nine hundred and fifty-three.
Hairdressers Registration (Amendment) Act 1952	No. 5643	14 October 1952
An Act to amend Sections Eight, Ten and Sixteen of the Hairdressers Registration Act 1936. (Note: Hairdressers Registration Act 1936 (No. 4396))
Totalizator (Amendment) Act 1952	No. 5644	14 October 1952
An Act to amend Section Eight of the Totalizator Act 1930. (Note: Totalizator Act 1930 (No. 3861))
Melbourne and Metropolitan Tramways (Fire Brigades Payments) Act 1952	No. 5645	21 October 1952
An Act relating to Payments by the Melbourne and Metropolitan Tramways Board and Contributions to the Metropolitan Fire Brigades Board.
Health (Meat Supervision) Act 1952	No. 5646	21 October 1952
An Act to amend Sections Two hundred and eighty-four and Two hundred and ninety-two of, and to repeal the Fifth Schedule to, the Health Act 1928. (Note: Health Act 1928 (19 Geo. V. No. 3697))
Evidence Act 1952	No. 5647	21 October 1952
An Act relating to Evidence as to Marital Access and Adultery.
Imported Materials Loan and Application (Amendment) Act 1952	No. 5648	21 October 1952
An Act to amend the Imported Materials Loan and Application Acts.
Geelong Waterworks and Sewerage (Amendment) Act 1952	No. 5649	21 October 1952
An Act to amend the Geelong Waterworks and Sewerage Acts.
Building Operations and Building Materials Control Act 1952	No. 5650	31 October 1952
An Act to amend the Building Operations and Building Materials Control Acts.
Country Fire Authority Act 1952	No. 5651	31 October 1952
An Act to amend the Country Fire Authority Acts and for other purposes.
Parliamentary Contributory Retirement Fund Act 1952	No. 5652	31 October 1952
An Act to amend the Parliamentary Contributory Retirement Fund Act 1946, (Note: Parliamentary Contributory Retirement Fund Act 1946 (No. 5185)) and for other purposes.
Miners' Phthisis (Treasury Allowances) Amendment Act 1952	No. 5653	31 October 1952
An Act to further amend the Miners' Phthisis (Treasury Allowances) Act 1938. (Note: Miners' Phthisis (Treasury Allowances) Act 1938 (No. 4567))
Girl Guides Association Act 1952	No. 5654	31 October 1952
An Act to incorporate the State Council of the Girl Guides Association, Victoria, Australia, to confer and impose upon that Body certain Powers Duties Rights and Liabilities, to provide for the vesting in that Body of certain Property, and for other purposes.
	No. 5655	31 October 1952
An Act to apply out of the Consolidated Revenue the sum of Thirteen million nine hundred and fifty-four thousand six hundred and forty-five pounds to the service of the year One thousand nine hundred and fifty-two and One thousand nine hundred and fifty-three.
Revenue Deficit Funding Act 1952	No. 5656	23 December 1952
An Act to sanction the Issue and Application of Loan Money for Transfer to the Consolidated Revenue to meet the Deficit therein for the Year 1951-1952.
Public Works Loan Application Act 1952	No. 5657	23 December 1952
An Act to sanction the Issue and Application of Loan Monies for Public Works and other Purposes.
Local Government (Imported Houses) Act 1952	No. 5658	23 December 1952
An Act to further amend Section Nine hundred and one of the Local Government Act 1946. (Note: Local Government Act 1946 (No. 5203))
Railway Loan Application Act 1952	No. 5659	23 December 1952
An Act to sanction the Issue and Application of Loan Moneys for Works and Purposes relating to Railways, and for other purposes.
State Forests Loan Application Act 1952	No. 5660	23 December 1952
An Act to sanction the Issue and Application of Loan Monies for Works and other Purposes relating to State Forests.
Water Supply Loan Application Act 1952	No. 5661	23 December 1952
An Act to sanction the Issue and Application of Loan Money for Works and other Purposes relating to Irrigation Water Supply Drainage Flood Protection and River Improvement.
Hospital Benefits Act 1952	No. 5662	23 December 1952
An Act relating to Hospital Benefits and for other purposes.
	No. 5663	23 December 1952
An Act to apply a sum out of the Consolidated Revenue to the service of the year ending on the thirtieth day of June One thousand nine hundred and fifty-three and to appropriate the Supplies granted in this and the last preceding Session of Parliament.

== Sources ==
- "1952 Victorian Historical Acts". AustLII.
