= Balyang Sanctuary =

Park in Geelong, Australia

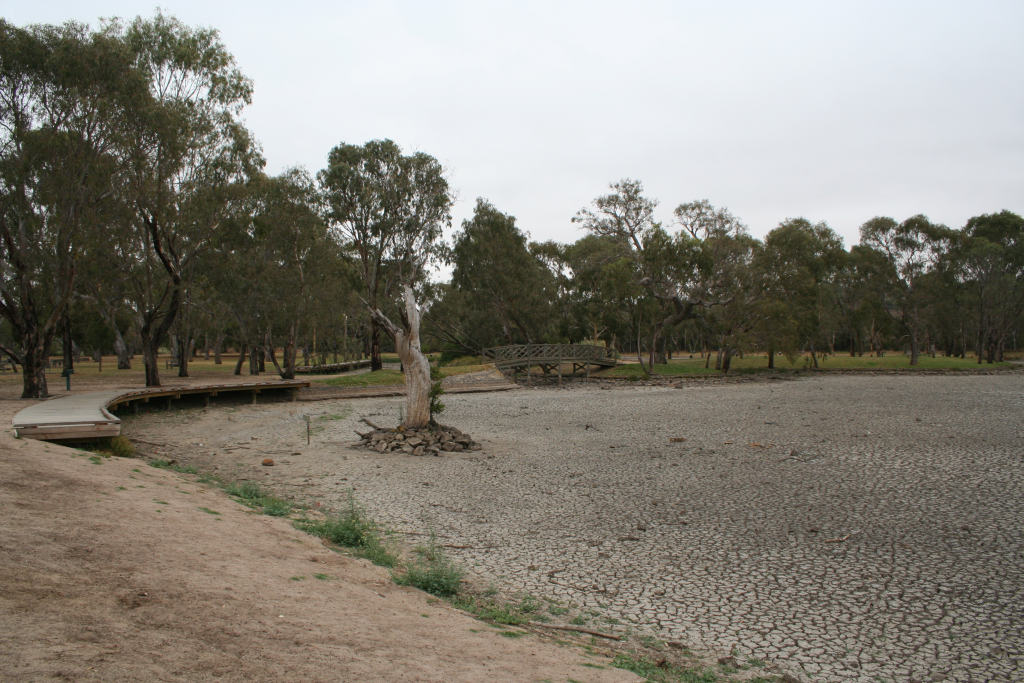
Balyang Sanctuary in drought during summer 2007

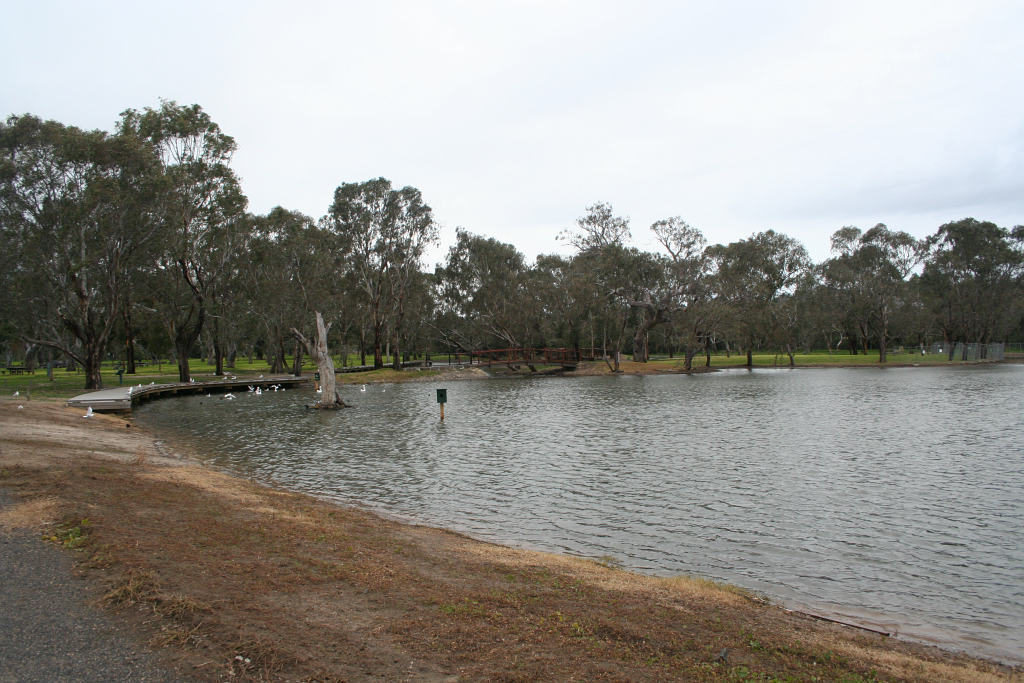
The lake refilled by winter 2007

Balyang Sanctuary is a public park in the suburb of Newtown, Geelong. Situated at 38.1642°S 144.3312°E on the banks of the Barwon River, it is 20 acres (8 ha) in size and consists of open park lands, lakes, and wetlands. It was opened in 1973.

== History ==
The area occupied by Balyang Sanctuary was once owned by Captain Foster Fyans, who purchased it in 1845 at the first government land sale. It was on that land that Foster built his permanent home, "Bellbird Balyang", to remember a young Aboriginal Australian who accompanied him in the early days of the Geelong settlement.

The land was mainly used for grazing, as it was low lying and subject to flooding. It was reserved as public open space under the Geelong Planning Scheme 1959, with the local City of Newtown responsible for acquiring the land. Negotiations began in 1965, but the landowner, H.S. Hargraves, wanted to continue using the land. It was not until 1969 that a price was determined.

Also during 1965, the current Princes Bridge at the end of Shannon Avenue opened. The new high-level concrete and steel girder bridge replaced an older wooden bridge first opened in 1889 at the end of what is now Marnock Road. The northern approach of the bridge was built on a new embankment, which encircles the western side of what became Balyang Sanctuary.

== Work begins ==
On 30 September 1970, a plan was adopted for the new park and work commenced on 1 August. Part of the works were carried out using the labour of the unemployed under the Non-Metropolitan Unemployment Relief Scheme. The cost had been estimated at $81,500, and $67,150 had been spent by the opening, $53,350 being for labour provided under the Relief Scheme. The park was officially opened on 16 August 1973 by the mayor of the City of Newtown, as well as representatives of the state and federal governments.

The park consisted of a main lake with a maximum depth of 2 feet 6 inches (75 cm), surrounded by bluestone and concrete walls. Three islands were situated in the centre, with public access to two of them via four footbridges. Water for the lake was supplied by two storm water drains at the northern end, as well as water pumped from the Barwon River. 150 car parking spaces were provided, as well as public toilets and picnic tables. A number of riverside walking and bike paths link Balyang Sanctuary with other parks along the Barwon River.

A number of both native and introduced species of birds inhabit the park, including swans, pelicans, Eurasian coots, dusky moorhens, Pacific black ducks, mallards, pied cormorants, geese and silver gulls.

== Today ==
In the early 2000s, an unsuccessful attempt was made to remove introduced European carp from the lake, but the extended drought during that decade resulted in the lake drying up in the summer of 2007. In early 2007, the Sanctuary was upgraded, with the bluestone edging of the lake removed and the lake reconstructed to more closely resemble a natural wetland.
