= William Calder (engineer) =

New Zealand surveyor and engineer (1860–1928)

William Calder (31 July 1860 – 18 February 1928), engineer, was born at Lovell's Flat, Milton near Dunedin, New Zealand, only son of Arthur Calder and his wife Margaret Milne, née Strachan. Calder was educated in New Zealand (Milton local school and the Otago Boys' High School in Dunedin 1876-77), and then attended Otago University. He became a cadet in the Government Survey Department in October 1883 and after five years of practical training, he passed the authorised surveyors' examination with credit in July 1888, and was responsible for much road construction and exploration in the North and South islands of the Dominion.

== Migration to Australia ==
In 1888, he came to Victoria and worked in private engineering and surveying firms. In October 1889, he became assistant town surveyor for the City of Footscray, and in July 1890 town engineer. At night he studied to gain certificates as municipal engineer (1890) and engineer of Water supply (1892). From December 1897 to March 1913, Calder was city engineer and building surveyor to the City of Prahran. Among the works he is credited with are the first asphalted carpet-road surface, the first refuse destructor in Australia, and the completion of a major drainage project. By March 1903 he was an associate member of the Institution of Civil Engineers, London, and a member of the Institution of Municipal and County Engineers of Great Britain.

== Country Roads Board ==
Calder made the greatest impact as the first Chairman for the Country Roads Board (CRB) from 1913 to 1928. Among his first tasks was to undertake an exhaustive inspection of the road system, which had been neglected by the responsible municipalities and state government since the building of the railways. Calder was known as a meticulous note-taker and enthusiastic photographer, and his notes recording the board's progress were transcribed and used as a basic reference for many years. Despite, shortages of money and manpower for road-building as a consequence of the Great War, Calder campaigned successfully for more funds, especially for arterial roads, both publicly and privately.

He toured Europe and North America in 1924 examining road-construction practice and road-administration and reported extensively on matters such as the controversy on the American concrete pavement techniques versus British asphalt. His report, published that year, is widely regarded as a classic of road-construction practice and road-administration.

== Legacy ==
Many of Calder's recommendations were included in the important Highways and Vehicles Act 1924, which provided for the declaration of State highways, two-thirds financed by the state government through the Country Roads Board. This network of highways is perhaps Calder's main achievement: the Calder Highway, the road to Bendigo and Mildura was named after him. The Country Roads Board's system of organisation was copied in other States, New Zealand and Fiji. Calder was a strong advocate for Federal assistance in highway construction, and attended the first meeting of the Federal Aid Roads Board set up under the act of 1926.

== Personal life ==
Calder had married Elizabeth Bagley Palmer of Dunedin on 4 November 1889 at Brunswick, Victoria. He was a devout Presbyterian and member of his church boards of management of Footscray and Armadale. He had close links with Professor Henry Payne of the University of Melbourne. Calder was known as a 'champion shot', and assisted with military training in the Moorooduc area during World War I. He hoped to retire to his small property at Red Hill, Victoria but died of cancer at East Malvern on 18 February 1928. He was still Chairman and chief engineer of the CRB when he died, and was replaced as chief engineer by Donald Victor Darwin.

Calder was survived by his wife, a son (Architect Stuart Palmer Calder) and a daughter, and was buried in Cheltenham Pioneer Cemetery after a ceremony at Gardiner Presbyterian Church. Calder's wife was awarded a special State pension by the Victorian Government, which saved her from financial difficulty. Memorials to William Calder include an avenue of trees on the road to Geelong beginning one mile past Werribee, cairns at Warragul and elsewhere in Gippsland, an obelisk on the Princes Highway, at Drouin, a plaque at Frankston and a bridge at Moe. A portrait of him by Tom Roberts, still hangs in the VicRoads offices, in Ringwood to this day.

== Bibliography ==
- R. Southern, ‘William Calder — public servant and engineer …’, Victorian Historical Journal, 48 (1977), no 3, and for bibliography.
- Roger J. Southern, 'Calder, William (1860–1928)', Australian Dictionary of Biography, Volume 7, Melbourne University Press, 1979, pp 526–527.
