= Fyansford Paper Mill =

Historic mill in Victoria, Australia

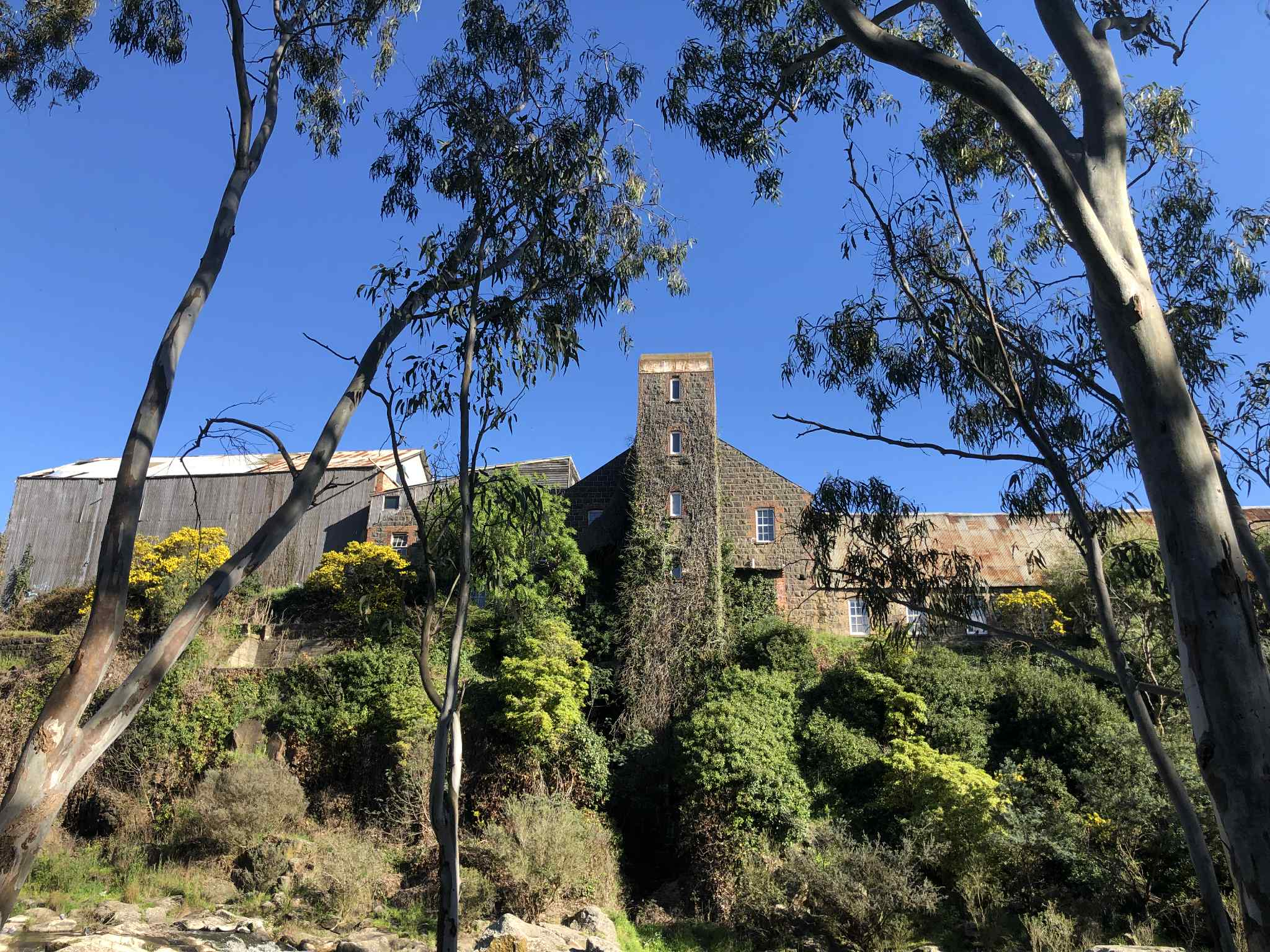
- Interactive map of the Fyansford Paper Mill area

General information
- Type: Mill
- Architectural style: Victorian
- Location: 100 Lower Paper Mills Rd, Fyansford, Geelong, Victoria, Australia
- Coordinates: 38°8′57.77″S 144°18′30.33″E
- Current tenants: Various
- Construction started: 1874-1875
- Completed: 1878

Victorian Heritage Register
- Official name: Barwon Paper Mill Complex
- Type: Natural and cultural heritage register
- Designated: 15 November 1989
- Reference no.: H0743

The Fyansford Paper Mill (also known as the Barwon Paper Mill) is an historic industrial complex located on the banks of the Barwon River adjacent to Buckley Falls, in the Geelong suburb of Fyansford, Victoria, Australia. Established in the late nineteenth century, the mill played a significant role in the early development of Victoria's paper manufacturing industry, producing a wide range of paper products for regional and national markets. The site includes a number of bluestone industrial buildings and associated infrastructure, many of which reflect the architectural and engineering practices of the Victorian period. Following its closure, the mill complex has been progressively adapted for new uses, and it remains an important part of the industrial heritage of the Geelong region.

== History ==
The Fyansford Paper Mill was established as Victoria's third paper mill and commenced production in August 1878. The venture was promoted by several prominent businessmen, including (most notably) Captain James Volum, alongside Andrew Volum, Silas Harding, and auctioneer William Francis Ducker. Construction and engineering were overseen by Andrew Millar, who drew heavily on contemporary English industrial practice. Millar equipped the mill with a 74in (187cm) paper machine, reportedly capable of extension to 84in (213cm), manufactured by James Bertram and Son of Edinburgh, Scotland.

Much of the industrial complex was constructed in the late 1870s and originally comprised the main mill buildings, the manager's house (1878), a row of six workers' cottages (1878), and a substantial bluestone water race with impeller tower and stone weir. When described by the Geelong Advertiser on 19 March 1878, the site already covered several acres and demonstrated a highly sophisticated layout for its time.

The newspaper provided a detailed account of the mill's rag-processing system across several purpose-built structures. These included a large rag-sorting house capable of accommodating up to 100 women, a rag-cutting and dusting house equipped with mechanical cutters and willowers, and an adjoining building containing a huge spiked cylindrical "devil" (used to break down fibres before boiling). The rag-boiling house housed an enormous boiler able to process two tonnes of material at a time, which then supplied pulp to the rag-engine house containing four large beating engines.

From there, the pulp was pumped to the main machinery building, 155ft (47m) long and 35ft (10.5m) wide, where it passed through brass strainers before entering the papermaking machine. The complex incorporated nine large drying cylinders, polished-steel smoothing rollers, and a substantial stone foundation supporting more than 100ft (30m) of heavy machinery. Power was supplied by a Tangye expansion engine and a turbine wheel manufactured by McAdams of Belfast, Northern Ireland, considered one of the finest turbine installations in the world at the time. In early 1878, the Advertiser predicted that the works would become "the largest and most complete paper mill in the southern hemisphere."

The associated workers' cottages and the manager's house were designed by noted Geelong architect Joseph Watts. The cottages are regarded as the earliest known and most significant examples of pre-World War I purpose-built company housing in Victoria, particularly following the destruction of the Nestlé cottages at Dennington. Their design reflects international influences from British model industrial estates such as Lever Brothers' Port Sunlight, and the Cadbury Brothers' Bournville.

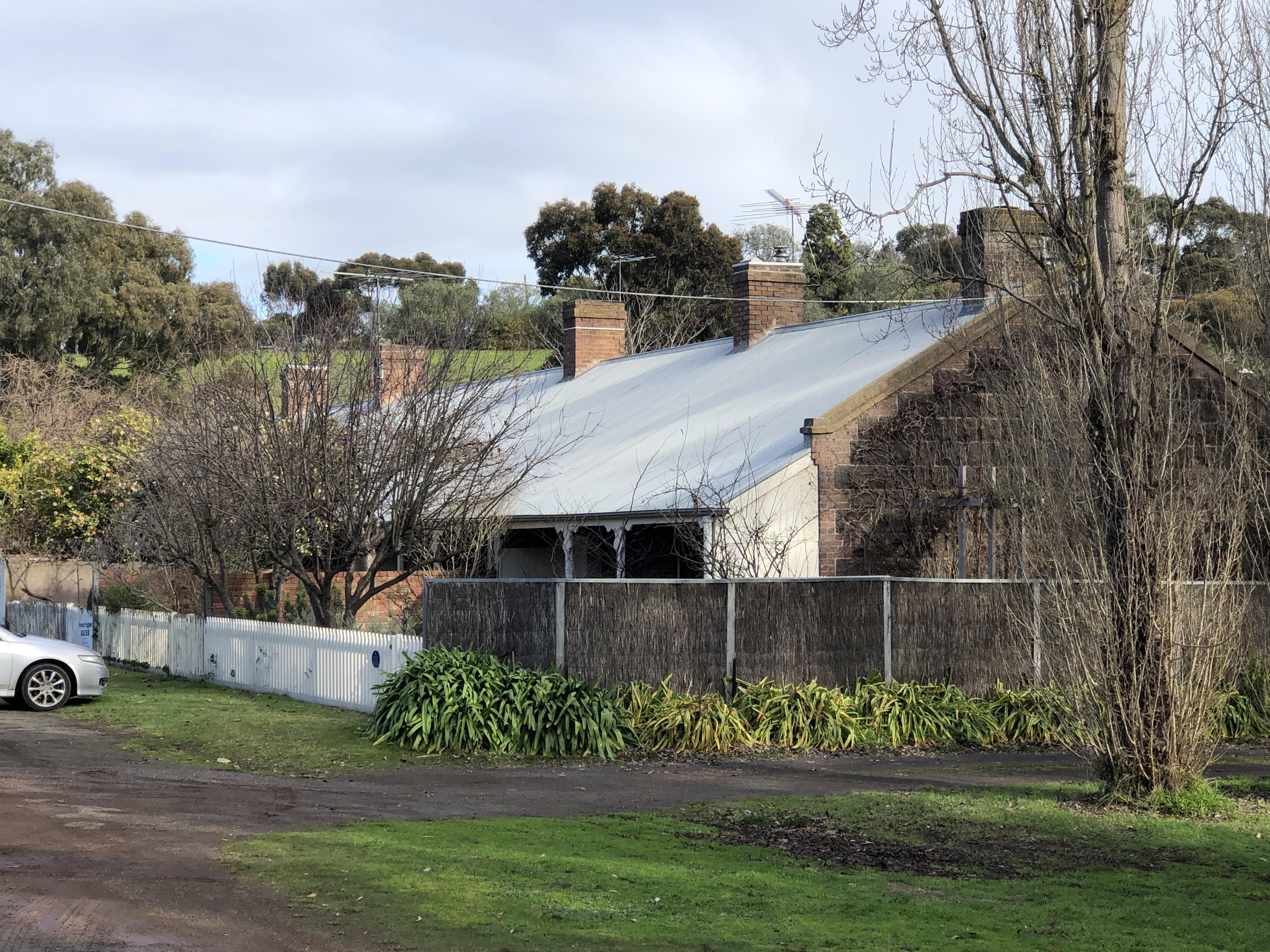
The Fyansford Paper Mill Workers' Cottages

The Fyansford Paper Mill became an important part of the emerging Australian paper industry. In 1888 the site was acquired by the Victorian Paper Manufacturing Co. Ltd., whose shareholders included Henry Thomas Littlewood. In 1895 Brookes and Currie, the owners of Ramsden's Paper Mill in Melbourne, purchased the Barwon works through their agent Robert George McCutcheon. They then amalgamated with James Macdougall of the Broadford Mill to form the Australian Paper Mills Co. Ltd., combining the Melbourne, Geelong, and Broadford operations. The Fyansford mill continued operating until 1923, making it one of the earliest and longest-running 19th-century paper mills in Australia.

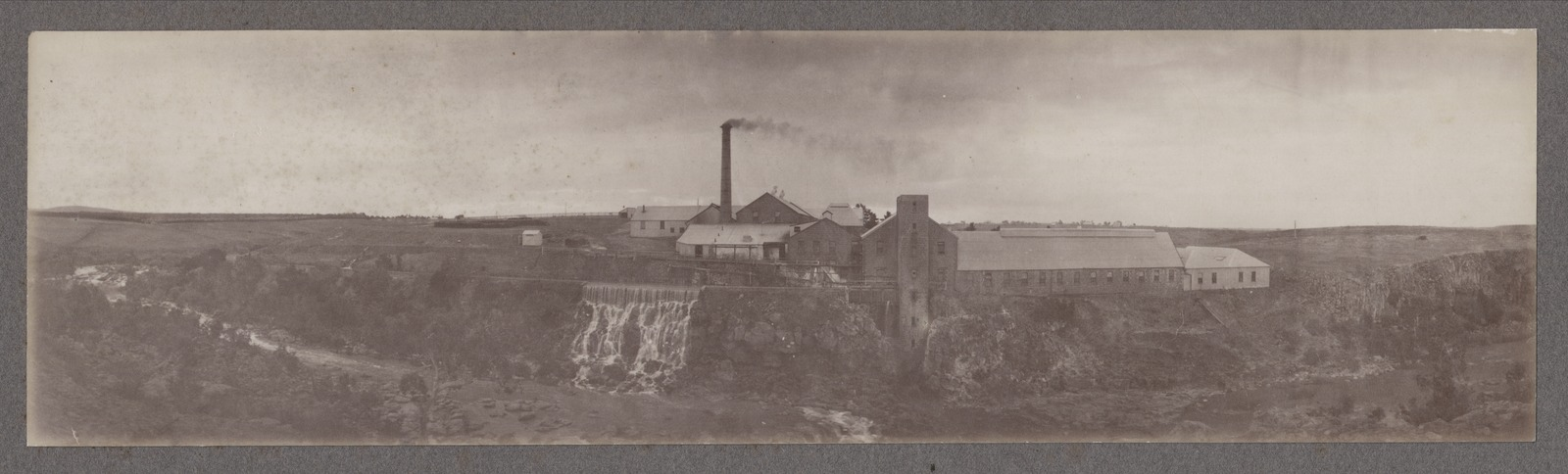
Panorama of the Fyansford Paper Mill, between 1891-1910.

From 1929 to 1941, the site was home to the Hydro Ice Company, which used the complex as cool stores and to manufacture ice. The site was then acquired by the Royal Australian Navy, which used the complex to store sea mines. The sea mine cases were manufactured in the Ford factory in North Geelong, and then transported to the mill, where they were packed with explosives and stored away, until they were eventually transported to Swan Island, and then loaded onto naval vessels.

In 2001, the Fyansford Paper Mill was opened up to the public, and has since been home to several studios and workshops, including a cafe.

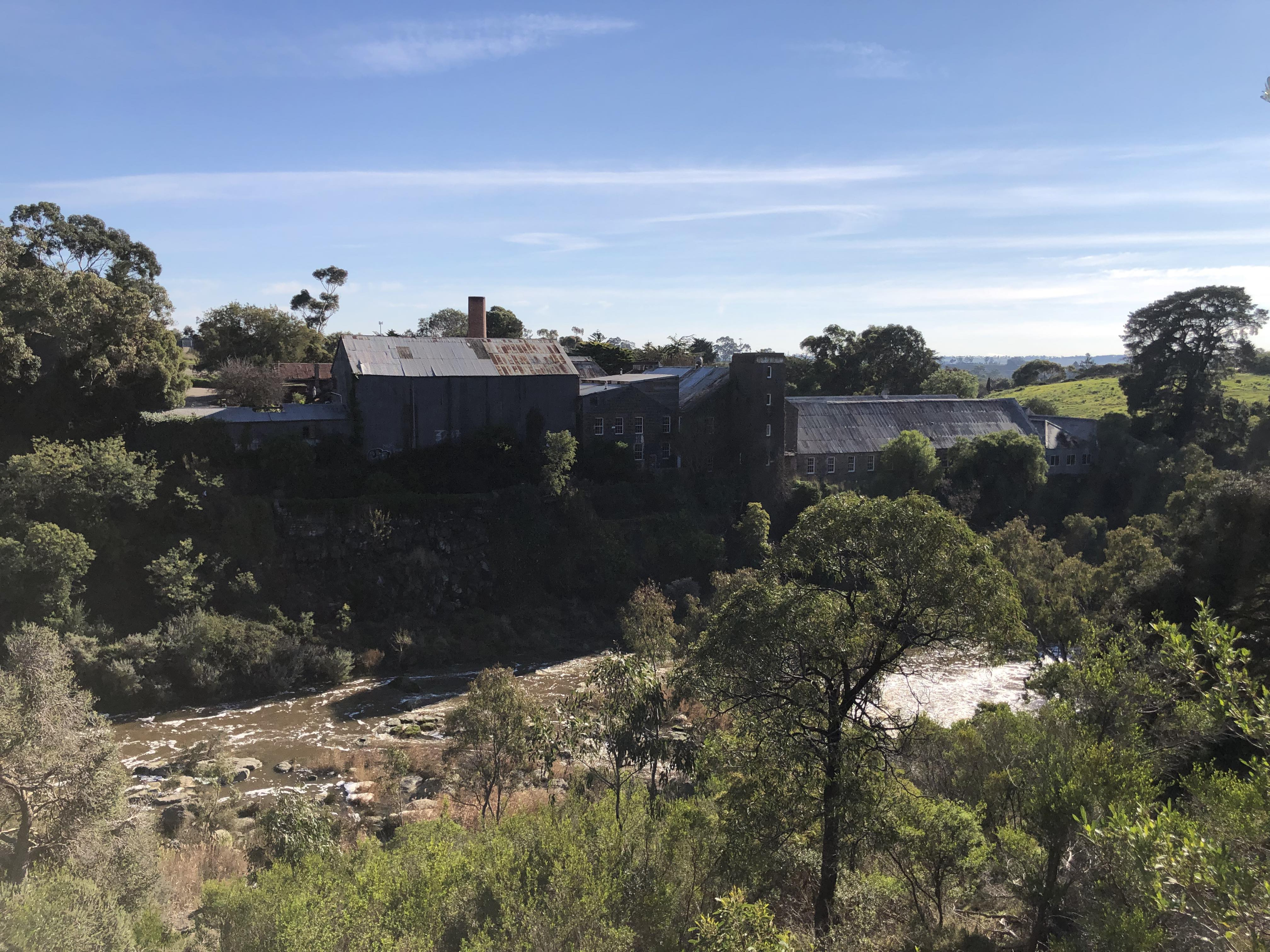
The mill viewed from the opposite side of the river, with Button Hill in the far right of the image.

In June 2021, a sandbag attached to some string was spotted hanging over the paper mill's water race upstream of Buckley Falls. Days after its spotting, a large breach in the historic wall was spotted in the same spot, with water flowing into the river proper as opposed to the water race. It has been posited that the sandbag may have been a small explosive, and the breach was made as there were fears that platypus had been flushed from Devil's (Bunyip) Pool, below Buckley Falls, to further downstream closer to the mill.

The Rotary Club of Highton begun conducting tours of the complex from November 2022, and run one day of each weekend, predominantly Sundays.

== See also ==
- Barwon River
- Bournville
- Buckley Falls
- Fyansford
- Geelong
- Paper mill
- Port Sunlight
