= Buckley Falls =

Waterfall in Victoria, Australia

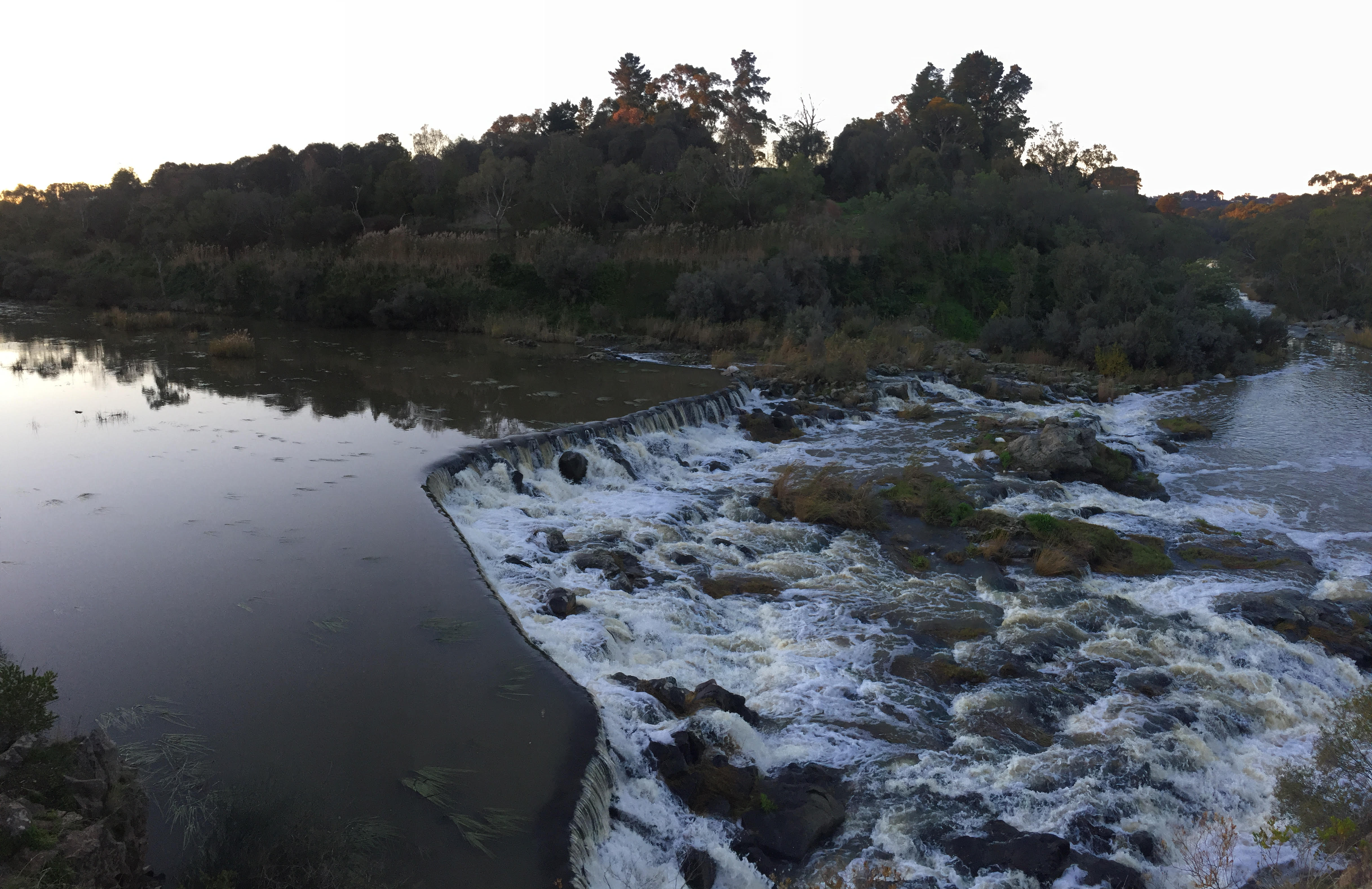
- Buckley Falls in the evening

- Location within Victoria
- Location: Geelong, Victoria, Australia
- Coordinates: 38°09′03″S 144°18′25″E
- Type: Cascade
- Elevation: 30 m (98 ft)
- Total height: 4 m (13 ft)
- Number of drops: 1
- Total width: 40 m (130 ft)
- Watercourse: Barwon River

Buckley Falls (alternatively written as Buckleys Falls) is a waterfall consisting of a series of rapids on the Barwon River in Geelong, Victoria, Australia, located between the suburbs of Highton and Fyansford. The falls form part of a popular riverside reserve featuring walking trails, lookouts and historical sites. The surrounding area is known for its ecological significance, early industrial use, and panoramic views of the Barwon River valley. The waterfall is named after William Buckley, an escaped convict.

== History ==
The area surrounding the waterfall served as a popular fishing spot for the Wathaurong Aboriginal people, as eels, fish, turtles and mussels that become ensnared by the rocks were caught with traps. The waterfall and surrounding area in the Wathaurong language is known as 'boonea yallock' (the place to catch eels).

The first European to sight the waterfall was likely William Buckley, an escaped convict who lived with the various Aboriginal peoples surrounding Port Phillip Bay after having escaped the Sullivan Bay settlement. Upon the recontact of William Buckley with Europeans in 1835, Buckley recounted that his "favourite place of resort was the locality now known as Buckley's Falls". The waterfall was officially named after him in 1836 by John Helder Wedge, an early surveyor of the region.

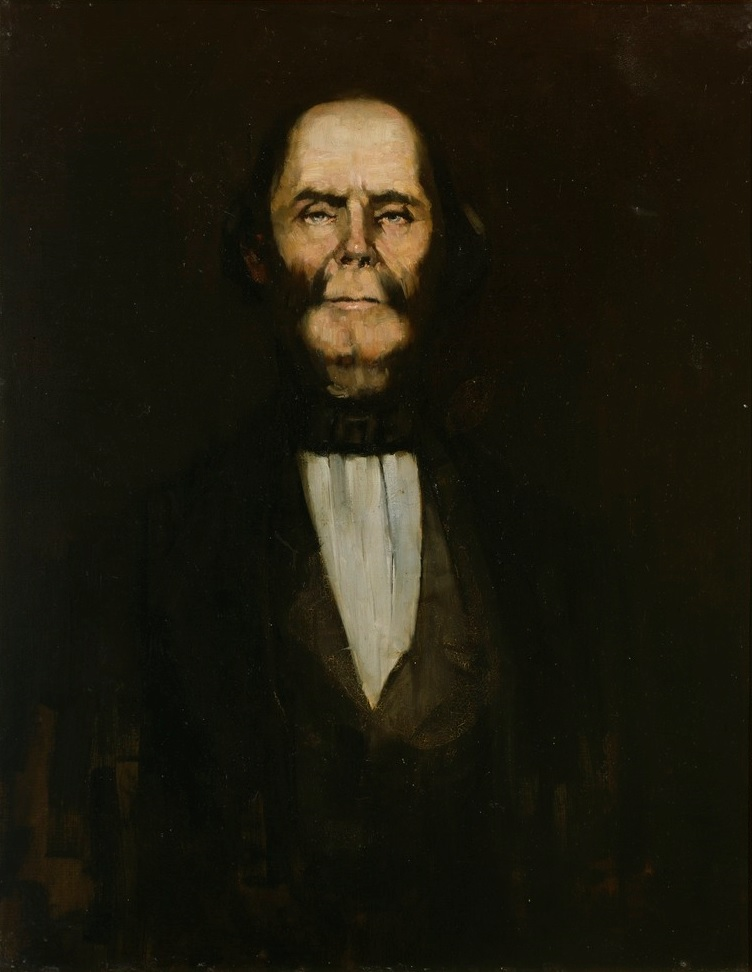
William Buckley, the waterfall's namesake

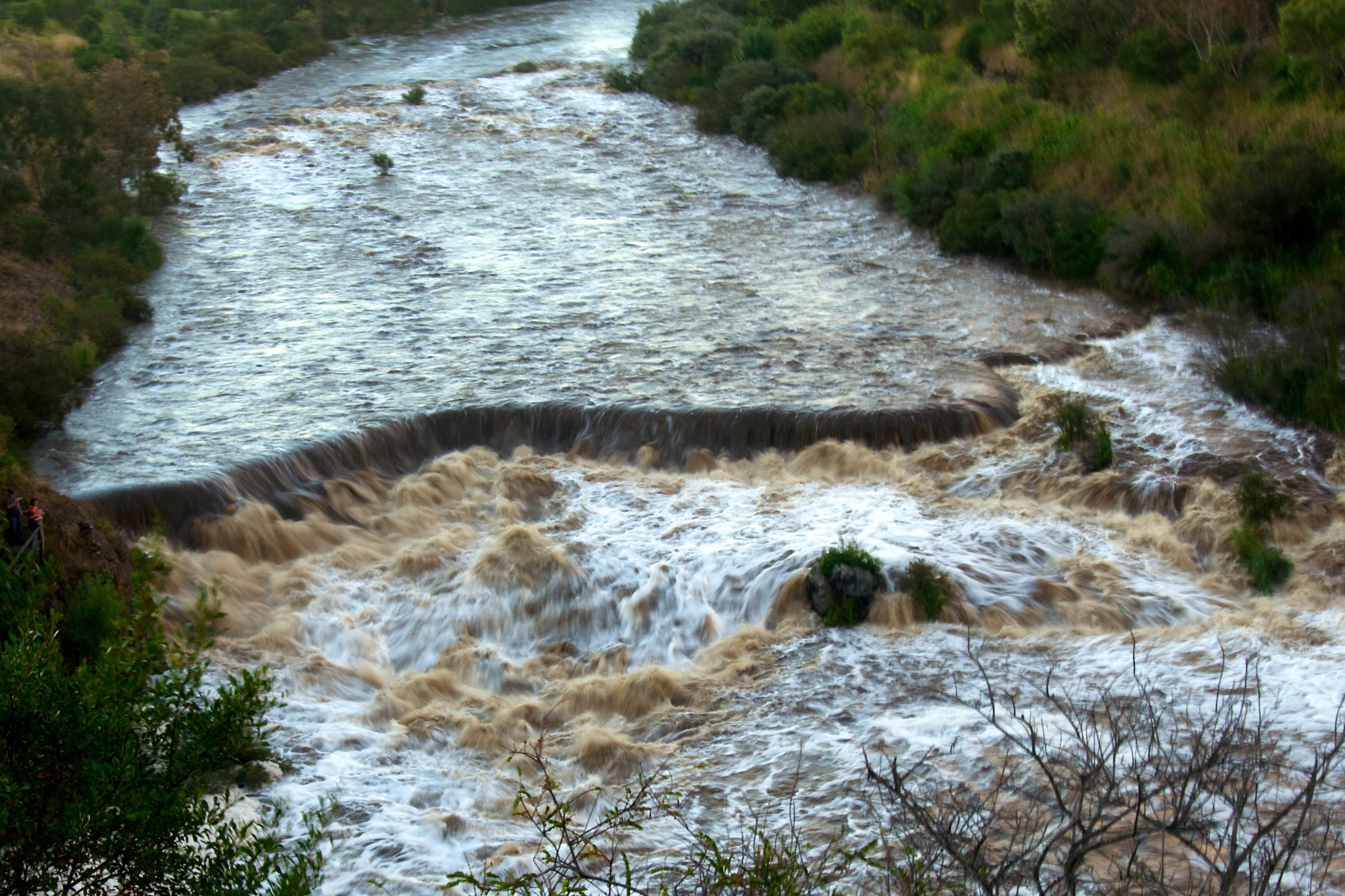
Buckley Falls during a flood

Buckley Falls was an important water supply in the early years of Geelong. For the original settlers, water was collected from wells or rainwater tanks, and as small streams surrounding the present-day city centre proved to be unreliable and foul, many turned to the water upstream of the waterfall. Water was either collected from here or, as the water was not reliable enough to sustain the town, water was carted in from Melbourne. In 1837, it was planned to build pipes to supply the fledgling town of Geelong with water from above the waterfall, however, these never came into fruition. Water was still bottled upstream up to the 1850's and beyond, primarily as a backup supply to alternate water sources.

In 1927, Victoria experienced a severe drought, and as Geelong's surrounding catchments had essentially received no rain, an emergency pump station was built adjacent to the waterfall, and a temporary weir that sat above the waterfall was also constructed, so as to contain as much water for pumping as possible. This temporary weir was demolished in 1931, leaving the original 1876 weir in place. The emergency pumping station was demolished in 1933, and a lookout now currently sits on its concrete remains, which can still be seen.

On 16 April 2017, an elderly man fell down the cliff face facing the waterfall suffering life-threatening injuries, and was subsequently airlifted to Geelong Hospital.

=== Baums Weir and the Flour Mill ===
In 1850, a weir was constructed further upstream past the riverbend, known as the Mt Brandon Peninsula. The weir, known as Baum (or Baum's) Weir, was constructed to slow down the natural speed of the river, as the water could be harnessed for industry. It is unclear who the weir is named after. Adjacent to the weir, the Barrabool Flour Mill was established around 1850 by Robert and William Jamieson, who, whilst from a family associated with Wandel Mill Farm in Lanarkshire, Scotland, it is unknown if they had milling experience before emigrating, and had instead worked as pastoralists at Port Fairy.

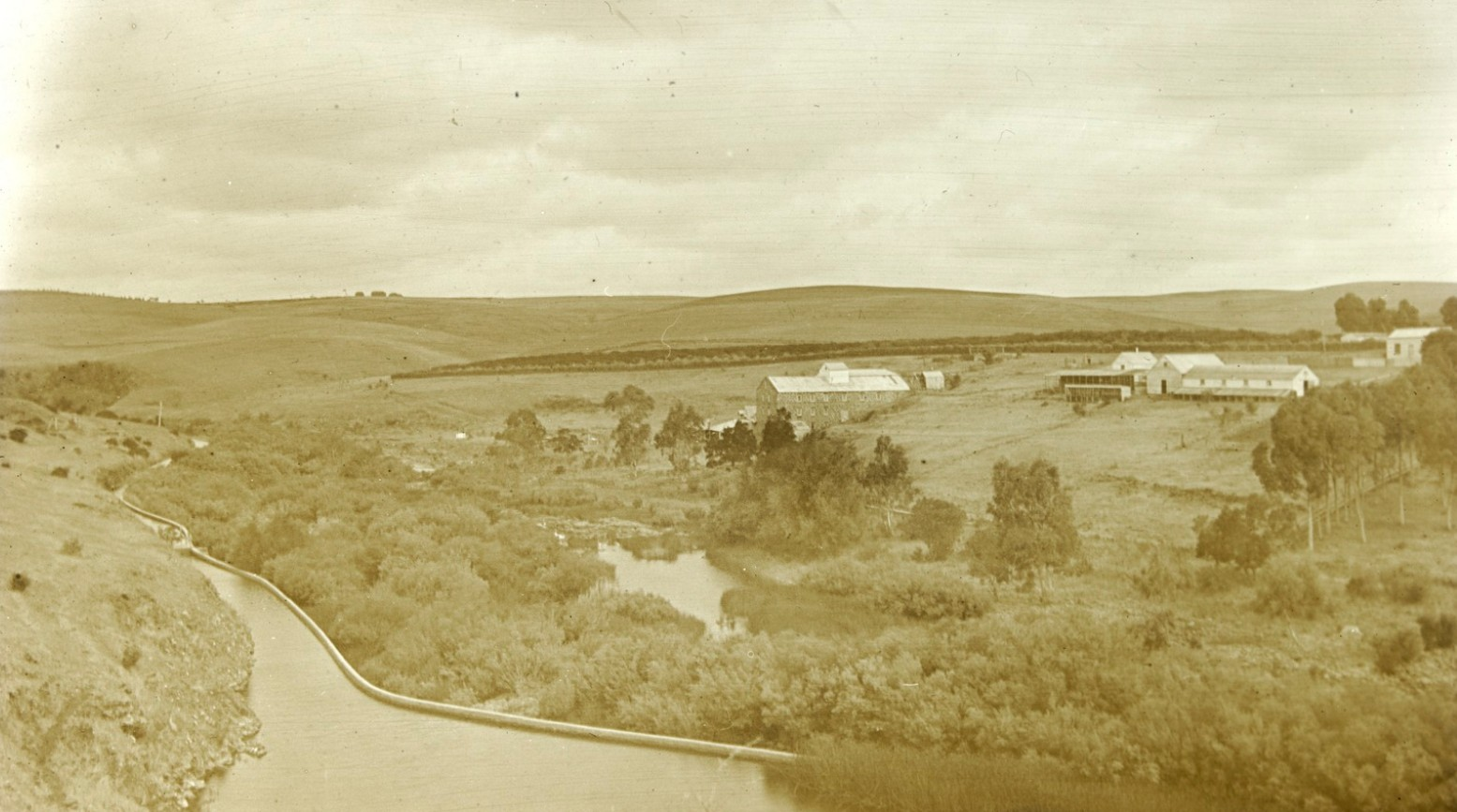
Barrabool Flour Mill

In 1849, they purchased the land surrounding Mt Brandon Peninsula and reserved it for milling. The mill was supposedly capable of grinding 1,500 pounds of wheat per hour. In 1851, Robert Jamieson sold the mill site to pastoralist and landowner John Highett, who had settled in Port Phillip in the 1830s and had progressively acquired land around Buckley Falls from 1849. Under Highett, the mill was operated by Frederick C. Morris.

In 1852, a large waterwheel attached to the five-storey bluestone building was washed away in a flood.

In 1874-5, the rights to the usage of the water were the subject of dispute, as the proprietors of the under-construction Barwon Paper Mill began building a water race on the north side of the river, from Baum's Weir, along the north side of the waterfall and to the mill. The Barwon Paper Mill also constructed a weir along the top of the waterfall, which is presently visible. This water race channeled more water than the flour mill's water race, and this resulted in the closure of the flour mill. John Highett sold the buildings by 1888, and the buildings were then used by the 'Fyansford Starch Factory'. It was later converted to a jam factory. The buildings still remained up to 1962, until they were demolished and the site essentially cleared. The only remains of the Barrabool Flour Mill to this day are the water race, rectangular concrete foundations, and a scatter of pottery, glass and old metal.

== Access ==
The waterfall can be reached by car, with a car park located beside the lookout and a lower carpark beside a picnic ground. It can also be reached by the Route 43 bus, which leaves from Geelong railway station via Deakin University, with two stops in the vicinity of the waterfall.

== Flora and Fauna ==
The waterfall and the surrounding area contains a wide variety of flora and fauna.

Flora and Fauna around Buckley Falls
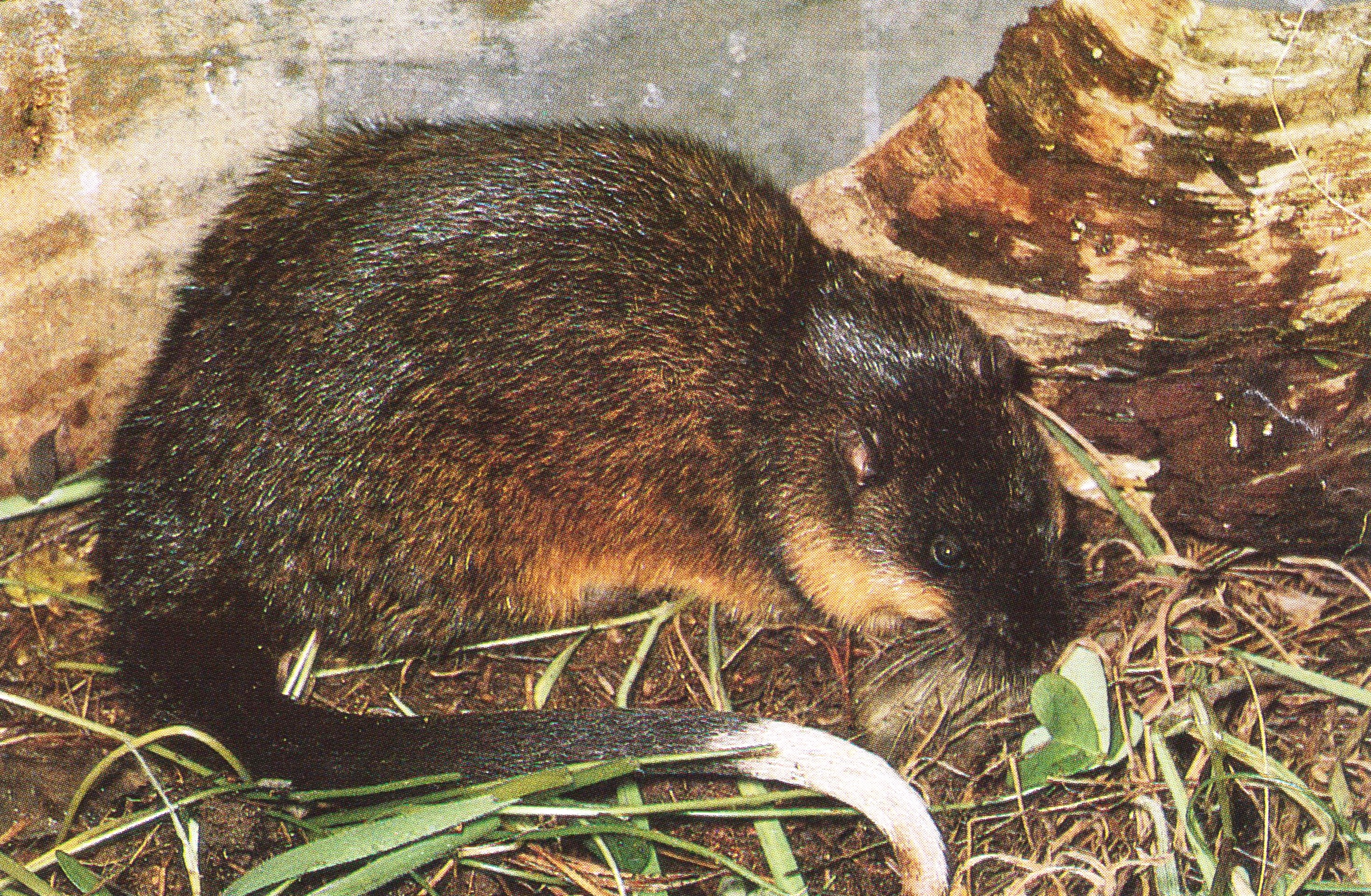
Australian Otter

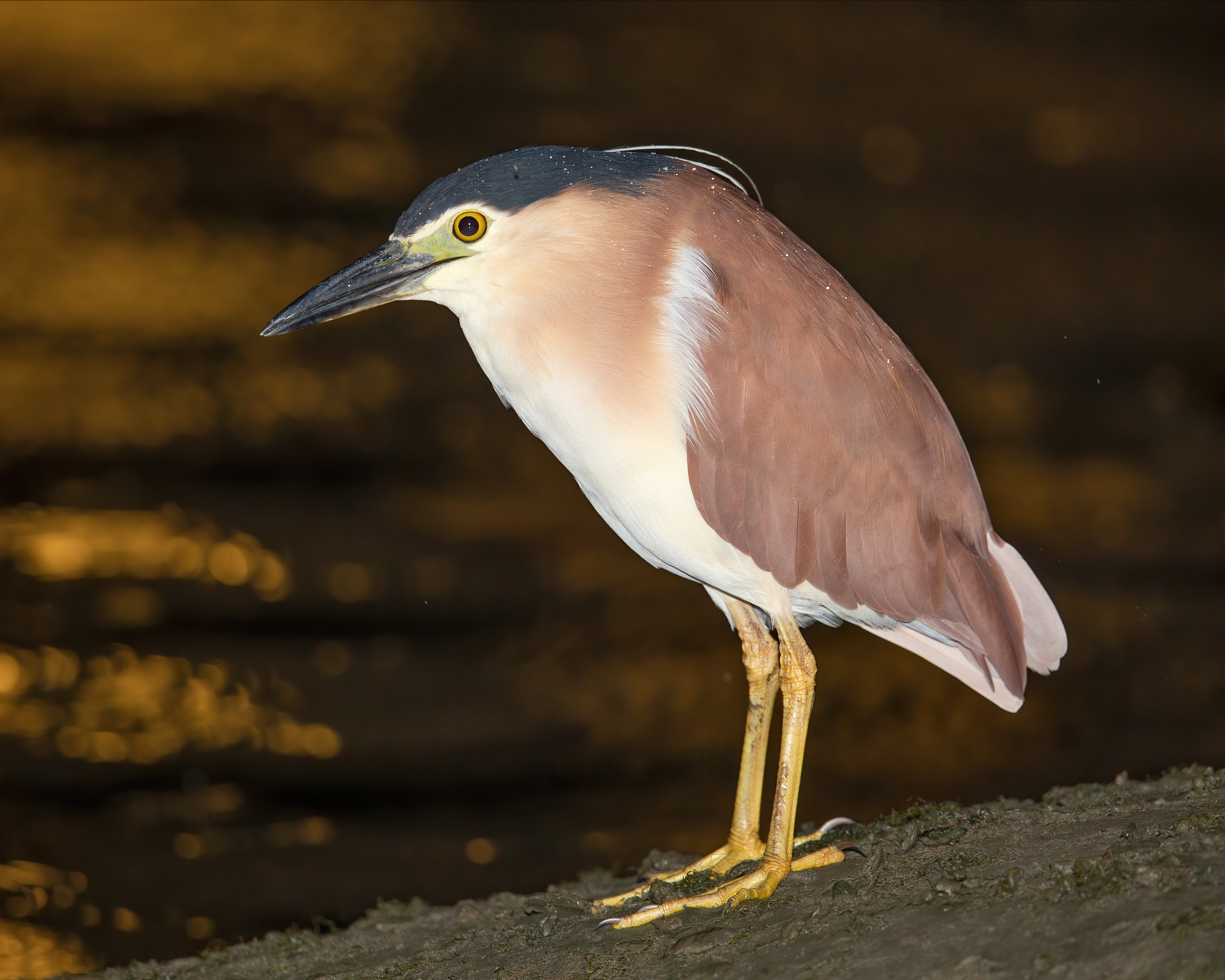
Nankeen Night Heron

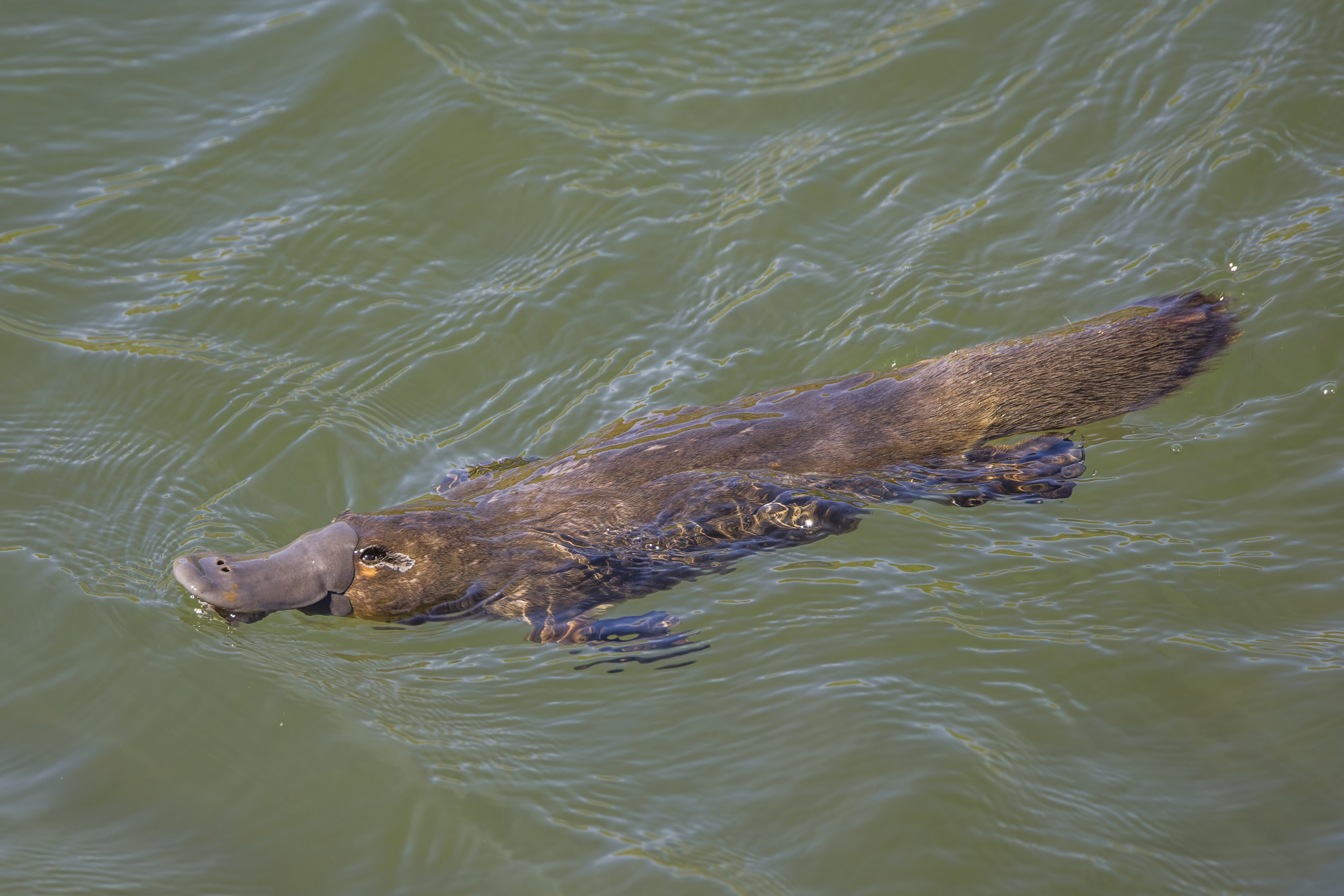
Platypus

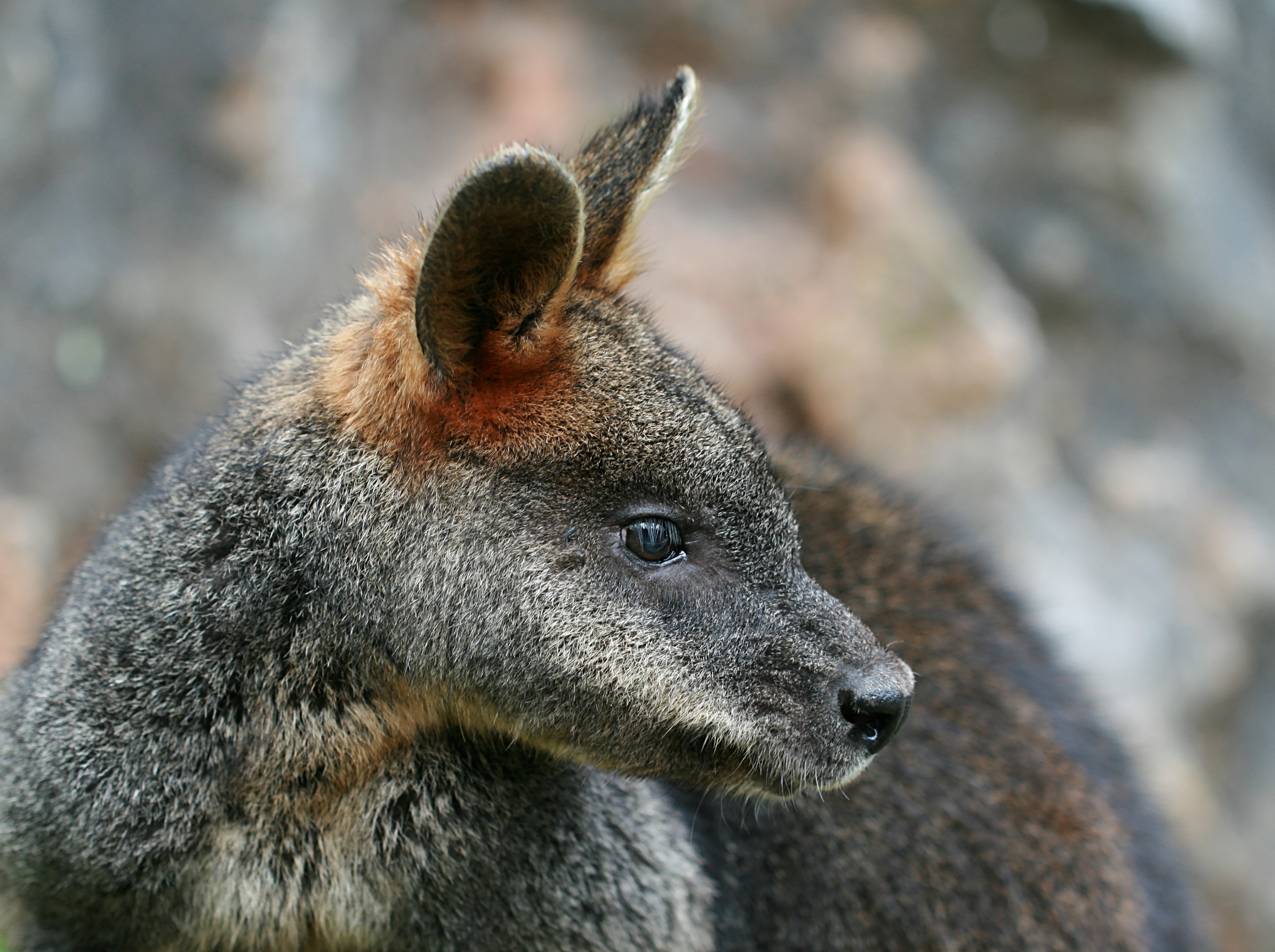
Swamp Wallaby

== See also ==
- List of waterfalls
- List of waterfalls in Australia
