= Donald Victor Darwin =

Australian civil engineer (1896–1972)

- Born: 11 October 1896; Redhill, South Australia
- Died: 8 March 1972 (aged 75); Malvern
- Citizenship: Australian
- Education: BCE University of Melbourne
- Parent(s): Henry Darwin, Jessie Louise Cleta, née Gmeiner
- Engineering career
- Discipline: Civil engineering
- Institutions: Institution of Civil Engineers
- Employer: Country Roads Board
- Projects: Barwon River Bridge, Geelong

Donald Victor Darwin (11 October 1896 – 8 March 1972) was an Australian civil engineer.

== Personal life ==
He was born at Redhill, South Australia to Henry Darwin, a native-born bank manager, and his wife Jessie Louise Cleta, née Gmeiner. Darwin was educated at St Peter's College, Adelaide and the University of Melbourne, receiving his BCE in 1920, and subsequently the MCE. Service in the Australian military during World War I interrupted his university studies; he served with the 10th Field Company Engineers, AIF, in France and Belgium from 1916 as a sapper. In 1918, he was awarded the Military Medal. He was discharged in 1919.

== Career ==
Darwin's professional career was entirely with the Victorian Country Roads Board (CRB), which he joined in 1920 as assistant engineer, becoming bridge engineer in 1924, responsible for the design and construction of highway bridges throughout Victoria. One of his major projects was to design the new bridge over the Barwon River on the Princes Highway in Geelong.

In 1929, Darwin was promoted to assistant chief engineer under founding chairman William Calder. He became assistant chief engineer in 1928, chief engineer in 1941, and was appointed to the three-member board of the C.R.B. in 1940, becoming chairman in 1949 on the retirement of Chairman W L Dale. During World War II, the CRB engineers were engaged on road, airfield and other civil engineering defence works in Victoria and Northern Territory.

In addition to his other duties, during the 1940s Darwin was a part-time lecturer in roads and street at the University of Melbourne. He became a councillor of the Institution of Engineers Australia Victoria Division (IEAust) from 1949, and president in 1957. He was appointed to the Tourist Development Authority in 1958, from which he retired in June 1962, although he continued to assist the Australian Road Research Board. He died 8 March 1972 at Malvern.

== Bibliography ==
- Chambers, Don, 'Darwin, Donald Victor (1896–1972)', Australian Dictionary of Biography, Vol. 13, Melbourne University Press, 1993, pp. 572–573
- Chambers, Don, From Bullock Tracks to Bitumen (manuscript, State Library of Victoria)
- Darwin, D. V 1956, The planning of roads systems throughout Australia: statement, Country Roads Board, Victoria
- Darwin, D. V. 1926. 'The Barwon River bridge, Geelong' Thesis (M.C.E. -- University of Melbourne, Dept. of Engineering, 1926
- Sun News-Pictorial (Melbourne), 5 Jan 1945, 2 Sept 1950, 11 Sept 1953
- Argus (Melbourne), 22 Mar 1949
- Herald (Melbourne), 10 July 1950, 1 Feb 1956
- Age (Melbourne), 17 Apr 1957, 24 July 1962, 10 Mar 1972
- Sydney Morning Herald, 8 June 1963, 25 Nov 1966
