= Foster Fyans =

Australian politician

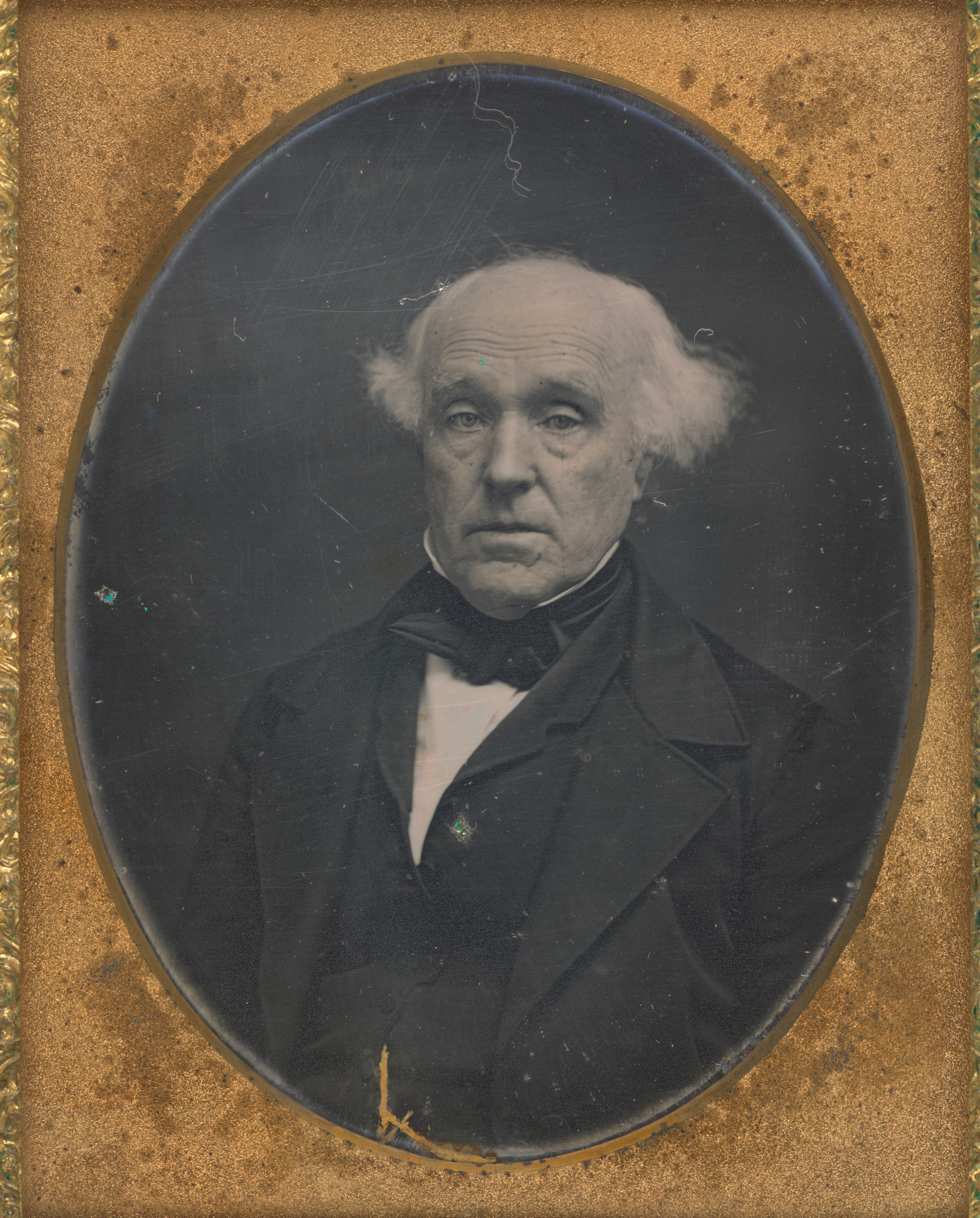
- Portrait of Foster Fyans, c. 1855
- Born: September 1790; Clontarf, Dublin
- Died: 23 May 1870
- Occupation(s): Military officer, penal colony administrator and public servant

Foster Fyans (September 1790 – 23 May 1870) was an Irish military officer, penal colony administrator and public servant. He was acting commandant of the second convict settlement at Norfolk Island, the commandant of the Moreton Bay penal settlement at Brisbane, the first police magistrate at Geelong, and commissioner of crown lands for the Portland Bay pastoral district in the Port Phillip District of New South Wales. He is the great-great-grandfather of actor Sam Neill.

== Early life ==
Fyans was born and baptised as an Anglican at Clontarf, Dublin in 1790, his father being a carpenter and a coach-maker in that city. He was educated at Drogheda Grammar School and at the Prospect School in Blackrock, Dublin.

== Peninsula War ==
Fyans joined the British Army in 1811, being assigned the junior rank of ensign in the 67th Regiment of Foot. His battalion was soon deployed to assist in the Peninsula War. Fyans was present at both Cádiz and Cartagena while these cities were under siege from Napoleonic forces. He was stationed for most of the war period at Gibraltar where he saw little action, but was promoted to lieutenant.

== British India ==
In 1818 Fyans was deployed with the 67th Regiment to India, where he served in the latter stages of the Third Anglo-Maratha War. He wrote an important first-hand account of the siege of Asirgarh Fort, where around 1,200 defenders held out against constant bombardment from British forces for weeks. Fyans praised the bravery of the Arab soldiers employed by the Maratha to hold the fort, and described their final surrender to the British.

After the battle of Asirgarh, Fyans remained garrisoned in India, being posted with the 67th at Malegaon, Solapur and Pune. He avoided sickness in a cholera epidemic and spent much of his time hunting, eating and drinking while being served upon by local army attendants. In 1826, he was briefly sent to Rangoon at the conclusion of the First Anglo-Burmese War, but his regiment was returned to Calcutta within weeks. Fyans was also promoted to the rank of captain during this year.

Fyans then returned to England, but in 1827 he transferred to the 20th Regiment of Foot in order to obtain another posting to India. He was mostly stationed at Belgaum and in 1832 he again transferred, this time to the 4th Regiment of Foot so that he could secure passage to New South Wales.

While in India, Fyans looted or purchased precious jewels which he later hid in secret compartments built into his furniture. A desk constructed by Fyans yielded diamonds worth £7,000 when it was sold at an auction in the 1940s.

== Norfolk Island ==
In early 1833 Fyans arrived with the 4th Regiment of Foot at Sydney, New South Wales. He quickly manoeuvred himself into being on good terms with Governor Richard Bourke and was soon posted to the penal colony of Norfolk Island as captain of the guard. He arrived at Norfolk Island in March 1833 which was then under the command of Colonel James Thomas Morisset, a depressed man with a disfigured face and a reputation for brutal discipline. The harsh treatment of the convicts under Morisset's reign coincided with a turbulent period on the island with several violent episodes and prisoner mutinies occurring. In September 1833, Fyans witnessed the hanging of three convicts for murder while another six were sentenced to death for stealing a boat.

Morisset's mental and physical health declined and on 7 January 1834, he gave full authority to Fyans to act as Commandant on the island. Eight days later, a large convict rebellion led by John Knatchbull occurred. Around 150 prisoners initially overwhelmed guards stationed at the convict hospital and elsewhere, but Fyans quickly organised his soldiers to counter the outbreak, allowing them to fire freely upon the rebels. This resulted in around fifteen convicts being killed and many others wounded. Two soldiers also accidentally shot each other dead while trying to round up the mutineers. The surviving convicts were captured and under Fyans' authority they were treated sadistically. Many were severely beaten to such an extent that Fyans broke his sword hitting them with the flat surface of it. Fyans ordered special sturdier cat o'nine tails to be used to flog the prisoners and heavier leg-irons with roughened surfaces were manacled to them. Fyans kept the rebels locked-up, naked in overcrowded jails for many months in irons, inflicting mass floggings with thousands of lashes being meted out. These actions earned him the nickname of ‘Flogger’ Fyans. The penal settlement was described as "hell upon earth" by one convict.

After the mutiny, Morisset officially resigned and Governor Bourke offered the commandant position at Norfolk Island to Fyans on a permanent basis. Fyans declined the offer and was relieved as acting commandant by Lieutenant-Colonel Joseph Anderson in April 1834. Fyans remained on the island until October 1834. While there, he obtained testimonies involved in the trial of the ring-leaders of the mutiny which resulted in thirteen being executed by hanging in late September. Fyans was accused by the judge of obtaining improper evidence that caused Knatchbull to escape conviction.

== Moreton Bay ==
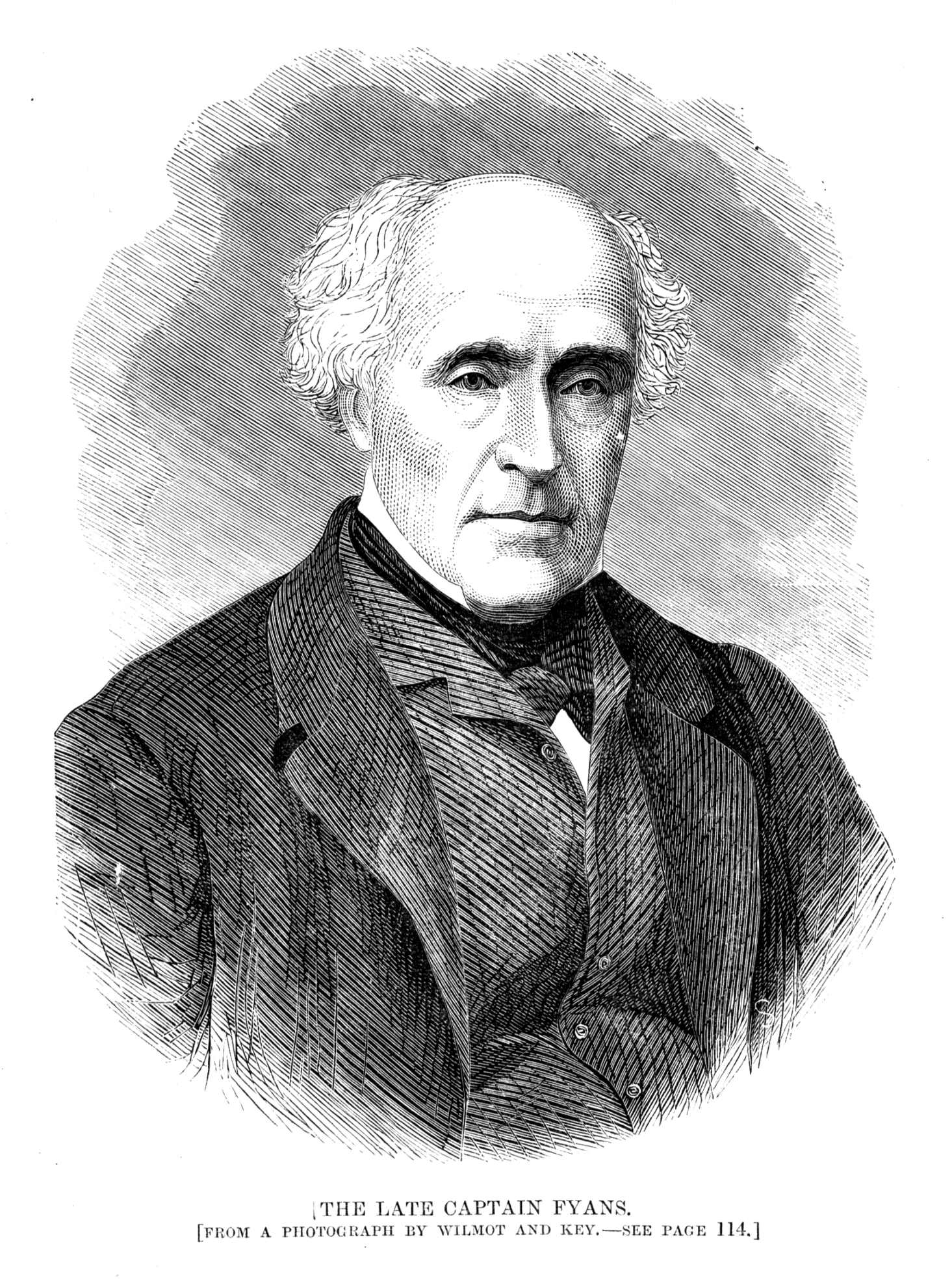
Foster Fyans

After returning from Norfolk Island, Fyans again used his friendly relationship with Governor Bourke to obtain the position of commandant of the Moreton Bay convict settlement in 1835. Fyans found the convicts at Moreton Bay very docile compared to those at Norfolk Island and had little need to order severe punishments upon them. The most trouble he had was trying to prevent the male soldiers and free-men in the colony from accessing the female convict barracks, known as the female factory. He had to move these barracks to Eagle Farm and construct a 17 foot high stockade around it.

Some prisoners absconded into the uncolonised regions surrounding Moreton Bay and a few managed to survive by living with the various Aboriginal clans. Fyans got along well with these Aboriginal groups and gave them food and other items in exchange for information and sometimes the return of these fugitives. One of these absconding convicts who returned after living several years with Aboriginal people was John Graham. Graham's knowledge and ability to communicate with the Aborigines proved extremely useful to Fyans when in 1836 it was discovered that a group of survivors from the wreck of the Stirling Castle were living rough with the local clans to the north. Fyans was able to quickly send Graham with a relief crew to recover some of the castaways including Eliza Fraser, who became famous from the incident and whom Fraser Island is named after. Fyans was also instrumental in documenting and reporting the factual details of the shipwreck and the ordeal of the survivors.

== Police Magistrate at Corio Bay ==
In July 1837, the 4th Regiment were ordered to India and Fyans was replaced as commandant at Moreton Bay by Lieutenant-General Sydney Cotton. Fyans decided to stay in Australia and sold out of his army commission. His patron, Governor Bourke, gave Fyans the civilian post of police magistrate at the newly colonised Corio Bay area near Melbourne in September 1837, settler pastoralists in the region having requested the colonial government for protection against Aboriginal raids.

Guided by William Buckley, an ex-convict who had lived with the local Barrabool people for thirty years, Fyans arrived at Corio Bay in October and attempted to locate a suitable site for his police huts. The Derwent Company of Charles Swanston had already laid claim to much of the region and Frederick Taylor, the manager of this giant sheep station, ordered Fyans to move on. Taylor had been advised by his employers to keep people, both black and white, from residing on the property, and had already been associated with the killing of a local Aboriginal man and later perpetrated a large massacre of native people. Fyans subsequently made camp at the junction of the Moorabool and Barwon Rivers, a place he named Fyansford.

One of Fyans' first duties was to muster together the members of the local Barrabool (or Wathaurong) people. Around 275 were gathered, to which the government had assigned Fyans to distribute tomahawks, clothes and blankets. Fyans refused to give the Aboriginal people the tomahawks, and instead had thrown them into the nearby river. There was also a shortage of blankets. The Barrabool people became agitated at this and Fyans arming himself with a shotgun, ordered his constables to load their firearms. William Buckley was able to defuse the situation and no blood was shed. A short-lived Aboriginal protectorate was soon established at Fyansford under Charles Sievwright.

The arrival of Fyans and his constables failed to curb frontier conflict in the area. William Yuille and other colonists dispersed a camp of local Aboriginal people with gunfire after his Murgheboluc property was ransacked of supplies. While in December 1837, George Russell's Clyde Company property at Inverleigh was attacked by a large group of Aborigines with Russell's employees shooting dead two native men. These incidents were reported to Fyans but he did little about it. In April 1838, a shepherd named Teddy McManus who was employed by the pastoralist Thomas Learmonth was killed by an Aboriginal man near Buninyong. This man was caught and chained up by the local colonists but was drowned before Fyans could start a murder investigation. Fyans was of the opinion that "intimacy" between the settlers and the Aboriginal women and the spread of venereal disease was the basis of much of the conflict.

In late 1837, Fyans received instructions to select a site for a major township in the Corio region. He concluded that the spot where David Fisher of the Derwent Company had established his hut as the best place and in 1838 this site was proclaimed as the township of Geelong. With convict labour Fyans also organised the construction of a breakwater across the Barwon River in 1838, which gave name to the area now known as Breakwater, an eastern industrial and residential suburb of Geelong. The ford stopped the inflow of salt water to the fresh water river, thus supplying the town with fresh river water. Fyans also established for himself a cattle property on the west bank of Lake Colac which he sold in 1842.

== Investigation at Portland Bay ==
In 1839, Fyans was ordered to Portland Bay to investigate official reports of deliberate massacring of Aboriginal men and women by raiding parties led by Edward Henty, as well as the "interference with native women" by the employees of the Henty Brothers, who were the pioneer squatters in that region. Fyans decided to travel overland to Portland Bay and trail-blaze a road from Geelong to that settlement. Surveyor H.W.H. Smythe and several mounted troopers accompanied him. They travelled through stony and swampy country which was occupied by a large number of Aboriginal people who caught fish and eels through the use of a system of weirs. At times, they dispersed these people with their horses and swords.

Arriving at Portland Bay, Fyans found that "no doubt numerous bad and improper acts have been committed" and recommended the establishment of a police station in the region. No report into the specific accusations of rape and murder against the Hentys and their employees appears to exist, and Edward Henty was later appointed magistrate in the district. Fyans toured the fine pastoral land north of Portland and returned to Geelong via the "magnificent country" around Mount Rouse. Along the way, they dispersed a group of Aboriginal people near Mount Elephant by firing their guns in the air.

== Commissioner of Crown Lands ==
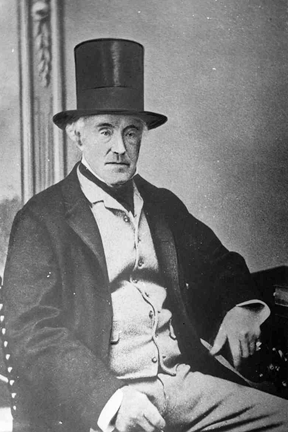
Foster Fyans

In May 1840, Fyans was appointed as Commissioner of Crown Lands for the Portland Bay district, an area half the size of England. With the support of sixteen Border Police troopers, his duties included making government returns for the licensed runs and their occupants, receiving their annual £10 licence fee and maintaining law and order between the squatters and the Aboriginal people. Described as “a man of hasty temper and a high hand”, Fyans' word as commissioner was law in the district, his decisions often at odds with the interests of high-profile squatters .

While he considered himself a "friend to the natives", when referring to the investigation and capture of Aborigines for trial he wrote to Charles La trobe:

Its a difficult thing to apprehend natives, with great risk of life on both sides. On the Grange, and many parts of the country, it would be impossible to take them; and in my opinion, the only plan to bring them to a fit and proper state is to insist on the gentlemen in the country to protect their property, and to deal with such useless savages on the spot.

=== Eumeralla Wars ===
By 1840, white settlers in the Portland Bay district had perpetrated multiple massacres of Aboriginal people during their colonisation of the region. A few settlers had also been killed including Patrick Codd, who was employed by John Cox at the Mount Rouse property. It was assumed that an Aboriginal man named Figara Alkapurata (also known as Rodger) was the killer. Codd's death resulted in the colonial authorities taking formal action with Fyans and his troopers sent in to capture the ringleaders of Aboriginal resistance.

In late 1841, two of Fyans' Border Police troopers were severely wounded in a skirmish with Aboriginal fighters at James Hunter's Eumeralla property. Fyans returned to Eumeralla with a larger force in early 1842, capturing two leaders and killing two other prominent Aboriginal men during a battle with thirty warriors. Alkapurata was captured by Fyans in April and later executed in Melbourne for the murder of Codd. However, vigorous Aboriginal resistance continued at Eumeralla into August with Fyans involved in close combat with Aboriginal men and James Hunter conducting three punitive expeditions of his own which resulted in severe skirmishes and dispersal of Aboriginal camps.

In September 1842, following pressure from squatters of the Port Fairy area, the superintendent at Melbourne, Charles La Trobe sent Fyans back into the region with his Border Police augmented with a contingent of Native Police to quell decisively the conflict known as the Eumeralla wars.

=== Extermination of the Gadubanud people ===
In 1846, a workman employed by the surveyor George Smythe was killed by a Gadubanud man at Cape Otway. Smythe returned to Geelong and reported the case to Fyans, who organised a well-armed militia of ten Barrabool men to be sent to the Otways to deal with the Gadubanud. Fyans and Smythe led the group into the region, where the Barrabool troopers killed all the known members of the Otway tribe, male and female, except for one girl who was taken back to Geelong. This girl was later found dead near a fence at Drysdale.

== Magistrate at Geelong ==
In 1849, Fyans was re-appointed to the position of police magistrate at Geelong and was nominated as the inaugural mayor of the Geelong Town Council. He became a Justice of the Peace and a judicial magistrate the following year, later being appointed as deputy sheriff for the Geelong region. He retired from public life in 1855. A favourite punishment meted out by Fyans in his judgements was to order the accused to be locked into the public stocks outside the court at Geelong.

== Family ==
In January 1843 Fyans married Elizabeth Alice Cane and they had three daughters and a son, one of the daughters was intellectually disabled and died after setting herself on fire. Fyans built a family home on his 'Balyang' estate (named after Balliang, a Barrabool man who served Fyans) adjacent to the Barwon River in 1846. Fyans' wife died in March 1858, aged 42. The actor, Sam Neill, is descended from Fyans' eldest daughter Gertrude.

== Death and legacy ==
Fyans died at his Geelong home ‘Balyang’ on 23 May 1870. He was buried at the Eastern Cemetery in Geelong. Places such as Fyansford and Mount Fyans are named after him, while Foster, Fyans and West Fyans streets in Geelong are also named in his honour. His estate home of Balyang is now the Balyang Sanctuary.
