= Barwon Catchment Victoria =

The Barwon watershed extends over a huge mass of land. From its beginnings in the Otway Ranges (in the south), and the Ballarat region (in the north), the basin forms a T shape. Its western border begins in Forrest, before moving up East of Colac and Rokewood, where it continues on to the northern tip at Ballarat. It comes back down through Elaine and Meredith, followed by Bannockburn and Geelong. It then follows the shape of the coastline, passing through Portarlington and St Leonards, before beginning to head inland at Ocean Grove and Barwon Heads. It follows the peaks of the Otways inland from the coast before heading up the western border at Forrest.
