= Country Roads Board =

Government agency in Victoria, Australia

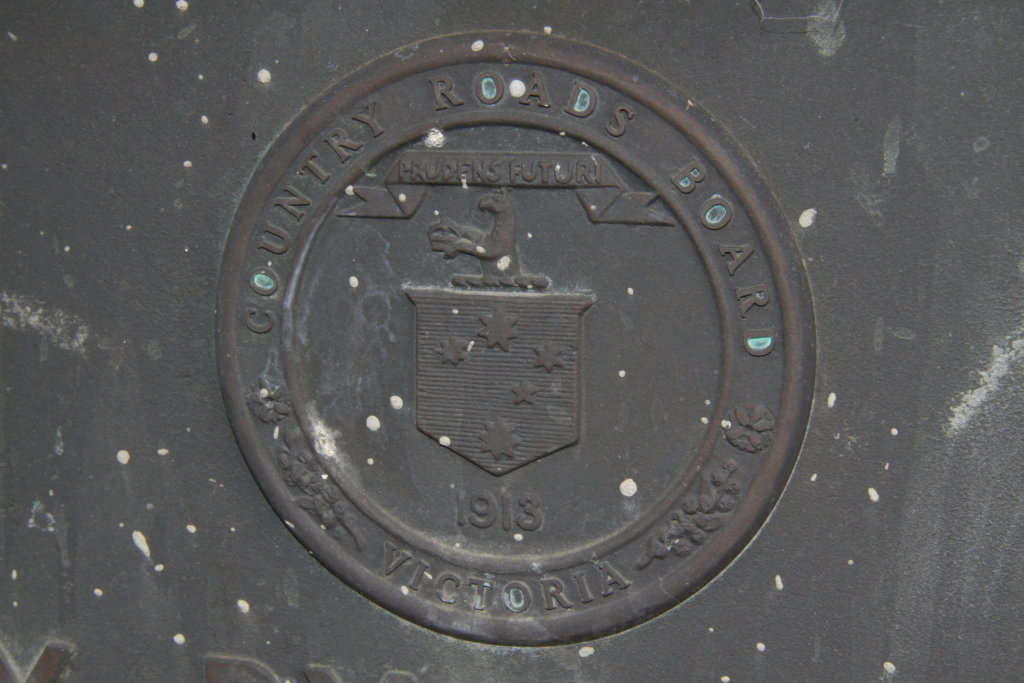
- Country Roads Board shield

Statutory Authority overview
- Formed: 26 March 1913
- Preceding Statutory Authority: Board of Lands & Works
- Dissolved: 30 June 1983
- Superseding Statutory Authority: Road Construction Authority
- Jurisdiction: Victoria, Australia
- Headquarters: Kew, Victoria
- Employees: 4,597 (June 1982)
- Annual budget: $342 million (1981/82)
- Minister responsible: Steve Crabb, Minister for Transport
- Statutory Authority executives: TH Russell, Chairman; WS Brake, Deputy Chairman
- Key document: Country Roads Act 1912

The Country Roads Board was a government authority responsible for the construction and maintenance of main roads in the state of Victoria, Australia between 1913 and 1983.

== History ==
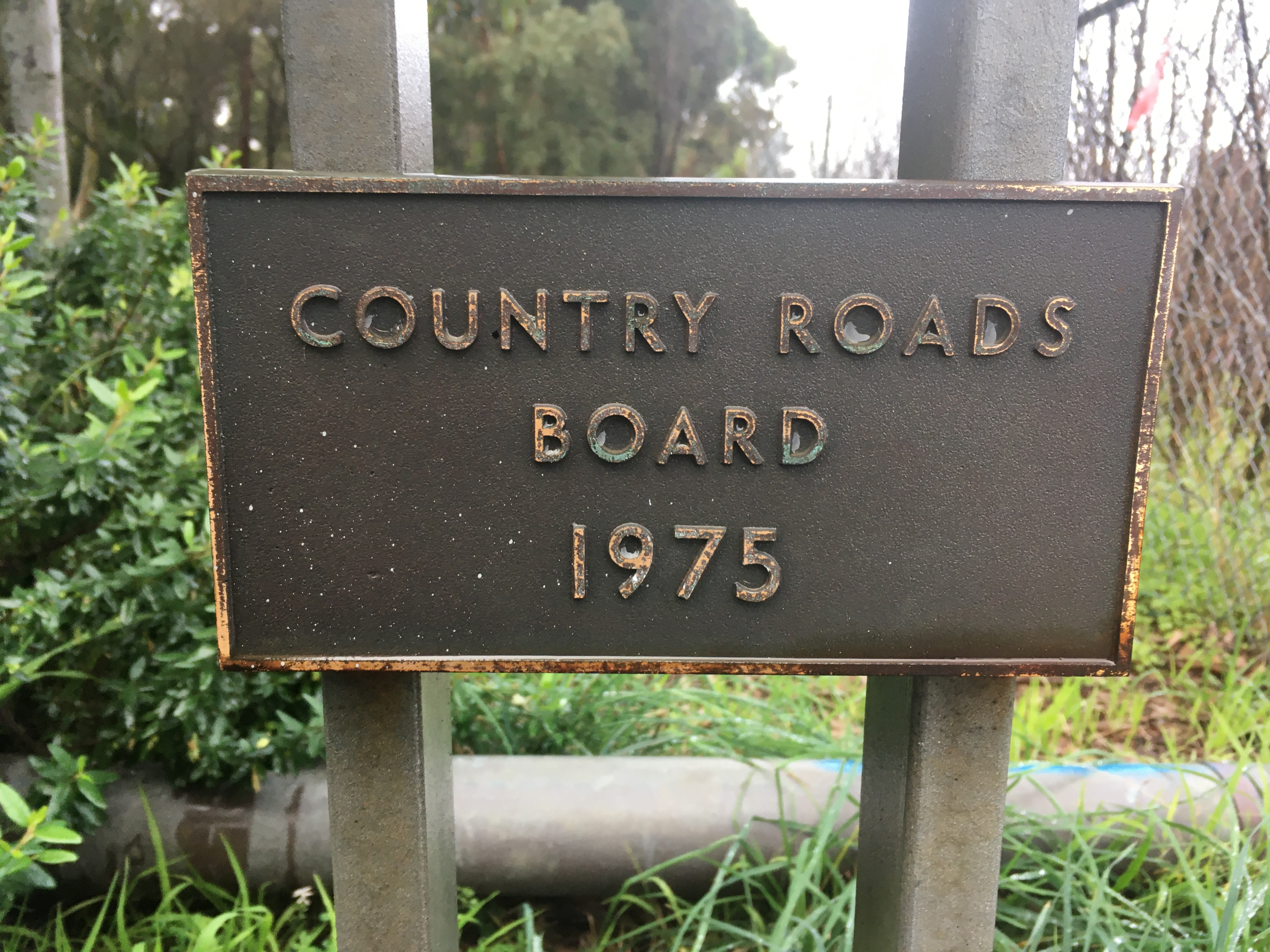
Country Roads Board plaque from 1975 on Yarra Bend Road bridge over the Eastern Freeway in Kew, Victoria.

The Country Roads Board (CRB) was formed to take over responsibility from the Board of Lands and Works for the care and management of the main roads of the state. Until then there was a lack of co-operation between the agencies with operational responsibility for roads, the Roads and Bridges Branch of the Public Works Department and local municipalities, in the construction and maintenance of main roads. Expenditure of state funds was without proper supervision or a thorough investigation into actual needs. The absence of a systematic policy, as well as a lack of funds, had resulted in Victorian roads being in a deplorable condition. At this time the use of the motor car accentuated the demands for better roads.

As a result of these needs the Country Roads Act 1912 (No. 2415) was proclaimed in 1913 establishing the Country Roads Board as a central road authority with responsibility for those roads within the state considered to be main roads.

== Functions of the board ==
The initial functions of the board, set out in the Country Roads Act 1912, were:

- to ascertain which roads should be main roads,
- to ascertain the most effective methods of road construction and maintenance,
- to ascertain the deviations in existing roads or new roads which would facilitate communication and improve conditions for traffic.

After an initial investigation by the board, construction guidelines were established and the letting of construction contracts, either directly by the board or by municipal councils, proceeded by about 1915.

The responsibilities of the CRB expanded over time. Responsibility for major roads in Melbourne was shared with the Melbourne and Metropolitan Board of Works, until all road responsibilities were passed to the CRB on 1 July 1974.

At various times other types of roads were proclaimed under legislation and subsequently came within the responsibility of the Country Roads Board. The Development Roads Act 1918 provided for the declaration of 'Developmental Roads', roads which would serve to develop any area of land by providing access to a railway station for primary producers. The Highways and Vehicles Act 1924 provided for the declaration of certain arterial roads as State Highways. The Tourists' Roads Act 1936 provided for the declaration of roads of sufficient interest or roads leading to tourist resorts or attractions as Tourists' Roads. The Country Roads Act 1956 enabled the board to construct by-pass roads which became popularly known as freeways. At the time of its cessation, the CRB was responsible for 23,763 kilometres of road.

== Chairmen ==
The first chairman of CRB was William Calder who remained in charge until his death in 1928.

Another prominent chairman was Donald Victor Darwin who took over in 1949, and steered the board through a massive post-war expansion program.

== Successor ==
The CRB was abolished and succeeded by the Road Construction Authority on 1 July 1983 by operation of the Transport Act 1983. This step occurred as part of a suite of major institutional changes in the Victorian transport portfolio affecting roads, trains and trams and related matters.

The Road Construction Authority was later merged with the Road Traffic Authority on 1 July 1989 to form the Roads Corporation. The Roads Corporation (and its successors) came to operate as VicRoads until July 2019.

== Publication ==
In November 1966, the CRB launched CRB News as its in house magazine.
