= Anglesea Recreation & Sports Club =

Rowing club in Victoria, Australia

- Nickname: Anglesea Rowing Club
- Sport: Rowing
- Founded: 1911
- Location: Anglesea, Victoria, Australia
- Website: www.anglesearegatta.org

The Anglesea Recreation & Sports Club (AR&SC) is a rowing club based on the Anglesea River at Anglesea, Victoria, Australia. Established in 1911, the club is best known for hosting the annual Anglesea Regatta, one of the town's longest-running events. The club operates from its historic riverside, which houses a collection of heritage rowing boats and memorabilia associated with the club's history and development of recreational activities in Anglesea.

== History ==
The Anglesea Recreation & Sports Club was established in 1911 after a challenge was issued by young men from Anglesea to their counterparts in Aireys Inlet for a series of rowing races. The club subsequently became the organiser of the annual Anglesea Regatta, a local tradition that had been held on the Anglesea River since at least 1887. The first organised regatta under the club's management was held during the 1910–1911 summer season.

The club's boatshed on the eastern bank on the Anglesea River was constructed between 1913 and 1914 and has served as the centre of the club's activities ever since. Until the mid-twentieth century, the building also served as Anglesea's public hall, hosting a variety of community events in addition to regatta activities. Today, it remains the focal point of the annual regatta and houses an important collection of historic objects, including four purpose-built wooden rowing boats constructed in 1913 by James Edwards & Sons of Melbourne, historic honour boards, a World War I memorial honour board commemorating club members who did not return from service, and several other heritage boats. The four original racing boats, are listed on the Australian National Maritime Museum's Australian Register of Historic Vessels.

Its inaugural president was S. R. J. Mawson, who donated the first Grand Challenge Cup and was instrumental in constructing the clubhouse. Another influential figure was Stan McMillan, who served as honorary secretary from 1914 to 1949 and as president from 1950 until his death in 1967. In recognition for his contribution, a timber organisers' stand was erected was erected beside the boatshed in 1967 and continues to be used during the regatta.

== Anglesea Regatta ==
The Anglesea Regatta is held annually on New Year's Day and is one of Victoria's longest-running community rowing events. While its origins date to the local aquatic regattas of the late nineteenth century, the event has been organised by the Anglesea Recreation & Sports Club since its formation in 1911 and has become a permanent fixture of the town's holiday calendar.

The early regattas combined rowing with a range of sporting and social activities, including swimming, tennis, golf and novelty competitions. The principal rowing event was the Grand Challenge Cup, contested by crews representing different local communities, including Anglesea, Aireys Inlet, Torquay and Gladstone (now part of Anglesea).

The regatta continues to welcome competitors of all experiences levels, from first-time participants to Olympic rowers. Events are held across multiple age groups and categories, including men's, women's and mixed pairs and fours, junior competitions, and age-based events for veteran rowers. Since 1911, races have continued to be conducted in the club's original timber rowing boats, making them among the oldest continuously raced competition boats in Australia.

== See also ==
- Anglesea Beach
- Point Roadknight Beach
