= Fairhaven Beach =

Beach in Victoria, Australia

- Beach
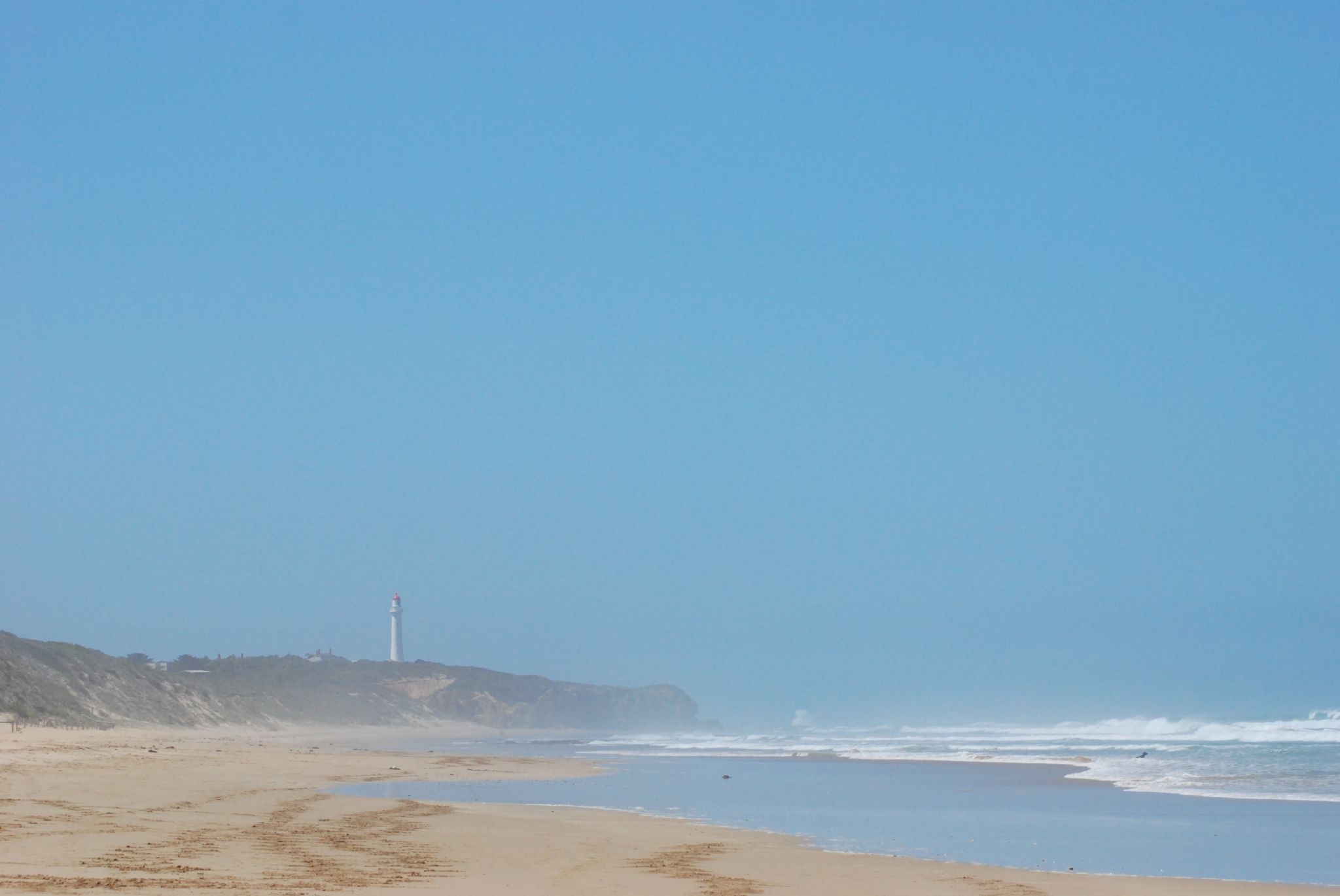
- Fairhaven Beach, looking towards Split Point Lighthouse
- Interactive map of Fairhaven Beach
- Coordinates: 38°28′08″S 144°04′08″E
- Location: Fairhaven, Victoria, Australia
- Water bodies: Bass Strait

Dimensions
  - Length: 6 kilometres (3.7 mi)
- Patrolled by: SLSA
- Hazard rating: 7/10 (highly hazardous)
- Access: Great Ocean Road

Fairhaven Beach is a coastal beach located along the Great Ocean Road between Aireys Inlet and Eastern View in Victoria, Australia. Extending for approximately 6 kilometres, it is the longest beach along the Great Ocean Road and is recognised for its expansive shoreline, strong surf conditions and natural coastal landscape. The beach is accessible directly from the Great Ocean Road, which runs alongside its entire length, and is a popular destination for surfing, fishing and beach recreation.

== History ==
The western end of Fairhaven Beach is associated with the history of the Great Ocean Road, with the Great Ocean Road Memorial Arch located near Eastern View commemorating the construction of the road by returned servicemen during the 1930s Depression era. The road provided improved access to previously isolated coastal communities and transformed the region into a major tourism destination.

The Fairhaven Surf Life Saving Club was established in 1957 and has since played an important role in beach safety along this exposed section of coastline. Located near the eastern end of the beach, the club continues to patrol during the warmer months and contributes to lifesaving operations at one of the Great Ocean Road's most popular surf beaches.

== Description ==
Fairhaven Beach stretches westwards from the mouth of Painkalac Creek for approximately 6 kilometres before gradually curving eastwards near Cinema Point. The beach faces predominantly south and is exposed to Southern Ocean swells, with average wave heights of around 1.5 metres. These waves interact with the fine to medium sand to create a broad surf zone containing two sandbars, with the inner bar frequently interrupted by rip currents.

The beach is considered potentially hazardous due to its exposed conditions, moderate waves and numerous persistent rips. Up to 20 rip currents can occur along the length of the beach, with stronger currents often developing during periods of larger swell or when westerly winds increase water movement along the shoreline. Visitors are advised to swim only within the patrolled area between the flags, particularly near the Fairhaven Surf Life Saving Club where conditions are monitored.

Fairhaven Beach is one of the most recognised surfing locations on the Great Ocean Road, offering numerous beach breaks and generally consistent swell. Popular surf locations include the mouth of Moggs Creek, which can produce left-hand waves during smaller summer conditions, "The Spot", a reef break near the surf club, and breaks near Eastern View and Spout Creek. The beach is best suited to experienced surfers due to its exposed nature and changing conditions.

The beach is also a popular fishing location due to its extensive shoreline, easy access and numerous gutters and rip holes. Anglers commonly fish near the mouths of Moggs Creek and Spout Creek when water is flowing, as well as along the beach itself.

Facilities at Fairhaven Beach include parking areas, toilets, showers and drinking water, with the Fairhaven Surf Life Saving Club providing a patrolled swimming area and overlooking the beach. While the wider beach attracts surfers and experienced ocean users, the patrolled section offers the safest conditions for general swimmers.

== See also ==
- Thirteenth Beach
- Torquay Surf Beach
- Torquay Front Beach
- Jan Juc Beach
- Great Ocean Road
