= Anglesea Beach =

Beach in Anglesea, Victoria, Australia

Anglesea Beach Anglesea Main Beach Anglsea Surf Beach
- Beach
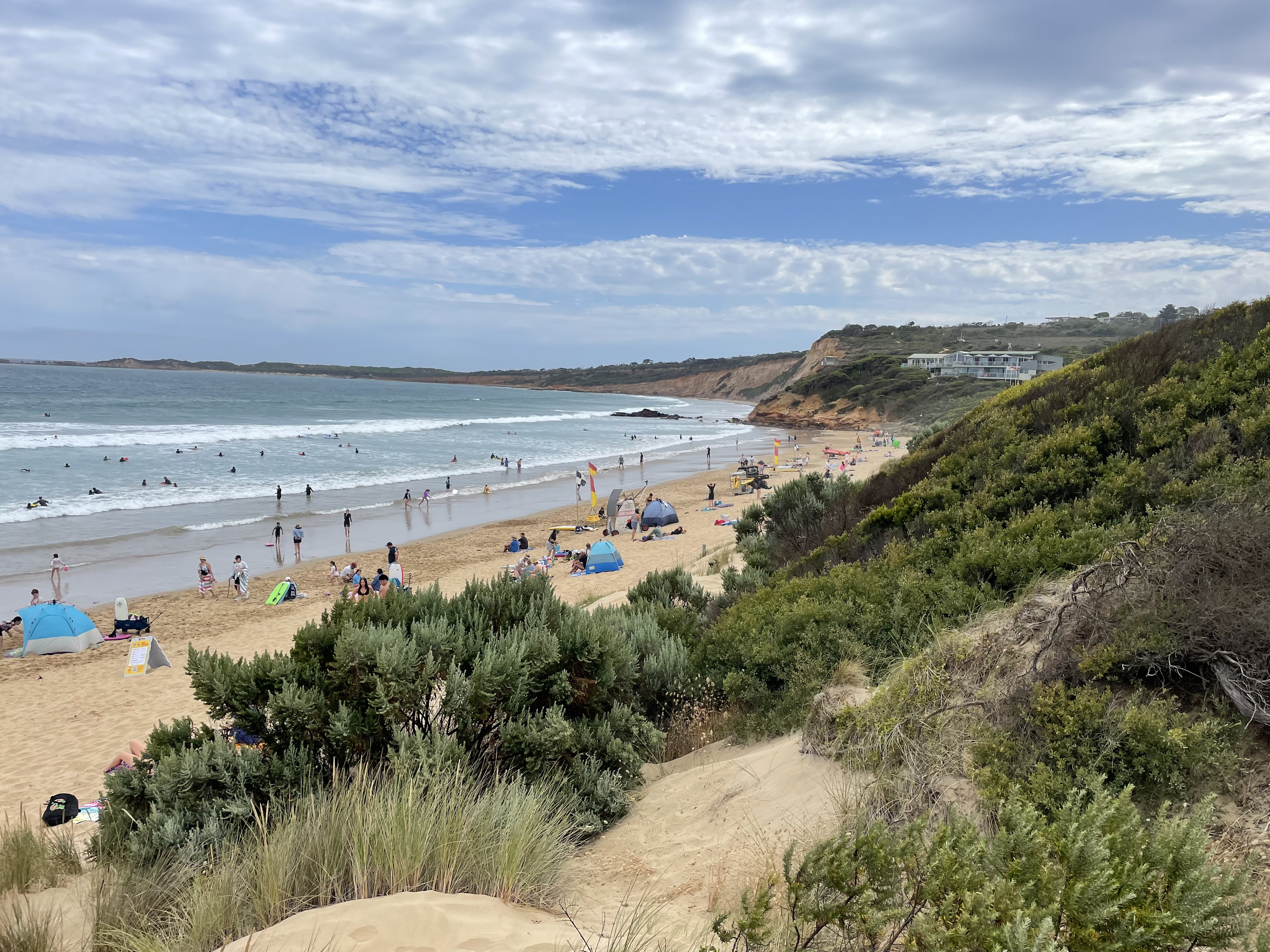
- Anglesea Beach
- Interactive map of Anglesea Beach
- Coordinates: 38°24′52″S 144°11′15″E
- Location: Anglesea, Victoria, Australia
- Water bodies: Bass Strait

Dimensions
  - Length: 0.4 kilometres (0.25 mi)
- Hazard rating: 5/10 (moderately hazardous)
- Access: Great Ocean Road

Anglesea Beach (also known as Anglesea Main Beach or Anglesea Surf Beach) is the principal beach of Anglesea, Victoria, Australia. Located at the mouth of the Anglesea River on the Great Ocean Road, the beach extends for approximately 400 metres and is one of the town's main recreational attractions. Patrolled by the Anglesea Surf Life Saving Club during the summer months, it is a popular destination for swimming, surfing and fishing.

== History ==
The Anglesea Surf Life Saving Club was established in 1952, and continues to patrol the beach during the summer season. They average around 12 rescues each year.

== Description ==
Anglesea Beach occupies the shoreline immediately south of the Anglesea River mouth, curving between the river entrance and the rocky cliffs below the Anglesea Surf Life Saving Club. The beach faces generally south to southeast and is influenced by the shelter provided by nearby Point Roadknight, which reduces the size of incoming ocean swells before they reach the shoreline.

The beach typically receives waves averaging around one metre in height, producing a broad, gently sloping sandbar that remains attached to much of the beach. Rip currents become more common towards the Anglesea River mouth, while a persistent rip can also occur against the rocks at the southern end of the beach. Under normal summer conditions, Anglesea Beach is regarded as a moderately safe swimming beach, with visitors advised to remain between the patrol flags and avoid swimming near the rocky headland or river-mouth rips.

Anglesea Beach is popular with swimmers, beginner surfers and anglers. The wide, gently sloping surf zone provides favourable conditions for less experienced surfers, while beach fishing is most productive near the river mouth where deeper channels and rip holes occur. Public access is available from both the Great Ocean Road near the river mouth and the Anglesea Surf Life Saving Club, with parking provided at both locations.

== See also ==
- Thirteenth Beach
- Torquay Surf Beach
- Torquay Front Beach
- Jan Juc Beach
- Great Ocean Road
