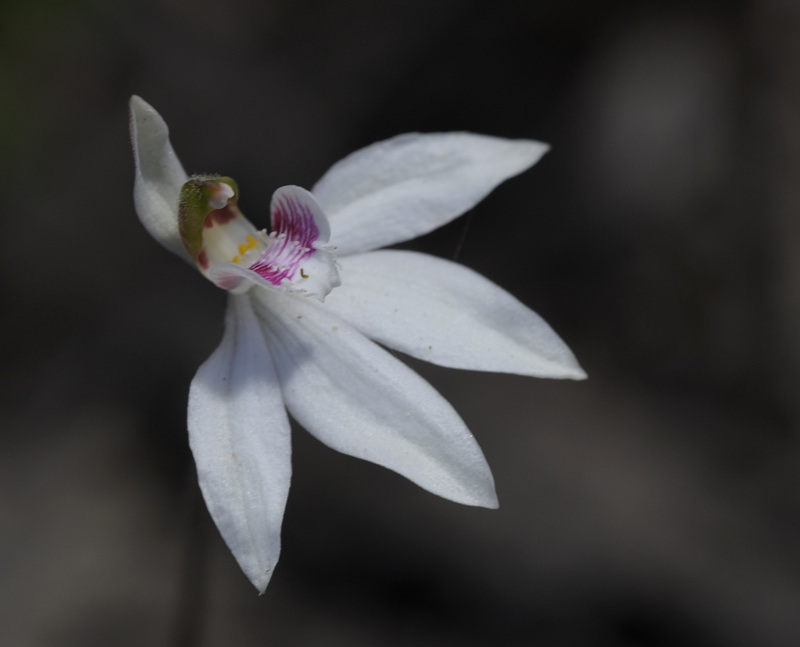

Scientific classification
- Kingdom: Plantae
- Clade: Tracheophytes
- Clade: Angiosperms
- Clade: Monocots
- Order: Asparagales
- Family: Orchidaceae
- Subfamily: Orchidoideae
- Tribe: Diurideae
- Genus: Caladenia
- Species: C. maritima

Binomial name
- Caladenia maritima D.L.Jones

Synonyms
- Petalochilus maritimus (D.L.Jones) D.L.Jones & M.A.Clem.

= Caladenia maritima =

Coastal fingers

Species of orchid

Caladenia maritima, commonly known as coastal fingers or Angahook pink fingers, is a species of orchid endemic to Victoria. It has a single, almost hairless leaf, and one or two white flowers with greenish backs. It only occurs in the coastal district of Anglesea.

== Description ==
Caladenia maritima is a terrestrial, perennial, deciduous, herb with an underground tuber and a single, almost glabrous, linear leaf, 60–150 mm (2–6 in) long and 1–3 mm (0.04–0.1 in) wide. One or two white flowers 20–25 mm (0.8–1 in) long and wide are borne on a stalk 100–200 mm (4–8 in) tall. The backs of the sepals and petals are greenish with a dark line along the centre. The dorsal sepal is erect, sometimes curving backwards and is 10–15 mm (0.4–0.6 in) long and 2–3 mm (0.08–0.1 in) wide. The lateral sepals are 13–17 mm (0.5–0.7 in) long, 4–5 mm (0.16–0.20 in) wide and spreading. The petals are 13–15 mm (0.5–0.6 in) long and 4–5 mm (0.16–0.20 in) wide and arranged like the lateral sepals. The labellum is 7–9 mm (0.3–0.4 in) long, 5–8 mm (0.2–0.3 in) wide and white with purple lines and blotches. The tip of the labellum is orange and curled under. The sides of the labellum have a few narrow teeth near the tip and there are two short rows of yellow or white calli in the centre of the labellum. Flowering occurs from September to October.

== Taxonomy and naming ==
Caladenia maritima was first described in 1999 by David Jones from a specimen collected near Anglesea, and his description was published in The Orchadian. The specific epithet (maritima) is a Latin word meaning "of the sea".

== Distribution and habitat ==
Coastal fingers occurs near Anglesea in a single population, growing in woodland with a heathy understorey.

== Conservation ==
Caladenia maritima is not classified under the Victorian Government Flora and Fauna Guarantee Act 1988 or under the Australian Government Environment Protection and Biodiversity Conservation Act 1999, but has been listed as "endangered" in Victoria according to the Advisory List of Rare or Threatened Vascular Plants in Victoria – 2004.
