= Moggs Creek =

- Town
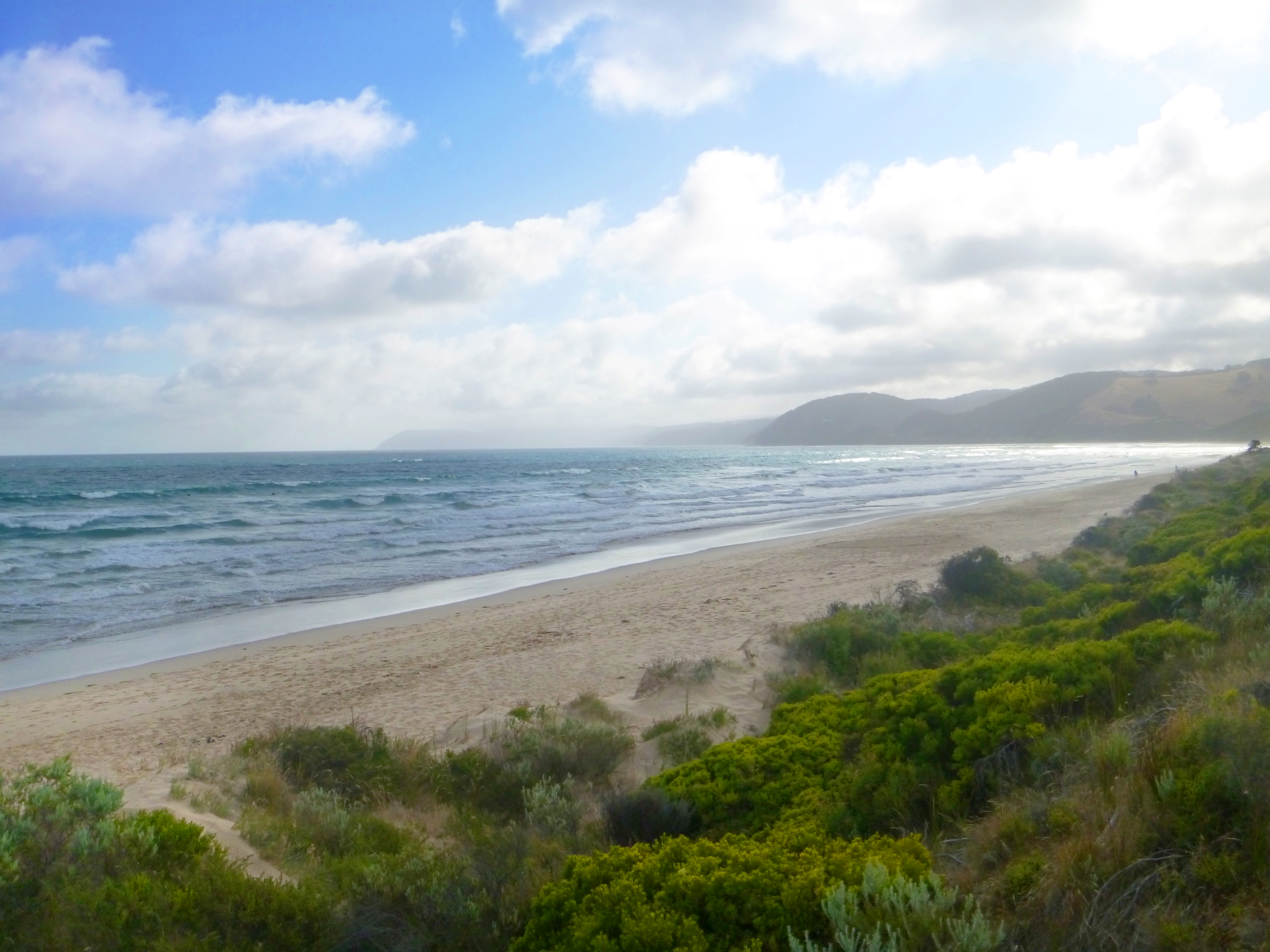
- Moggs Creek beach

- Coordinates: 38°27′22″S 144°04′01″E
- Country: Australia
- State: Victoria
- LGA: Surf Coast Shire
- Location: 43 km (27 mi) SW of Geelong; 107 km (66 mi) SW of Melbourne

Government
  - State electorate: Polwarth
  - Federal division: Wannon
- Elevation: 35 m (115 ft)

Population
  - Total: 120 (2021 census)
- Postcode: 3231
Localities around Moggs Creek
Eastern View	Aireys Inlet	Aireys Inlet
Eastern View	Moggs Creek	Fairhaven
Bass Strait	Bass Strait	Bass Strait

Moggs Creek is a locality in Surf Coast Shire, Victoria, Australia. It is located Great Ocean Road between Aireys Inlet and Lorne. In the 2021 census, Moggs Creek had a population of 120 people.

The settlement is located on a sandy coastal strip, backed by wooded hills, in which the creek itself rises, running about 10 km south-east to the ocean. The origin of the name Moggs is uncertain, the creek having also been known as the McLaren and Bell Bird in the past. Local belief is that Moggs derives from a family of graziers near St Arnaud, who used to bring cattle to graze in the area.

The construction of the Great Ocean Road in the 1920s led to further development, but it was only after World War II that land in the area was subdivided and sold for housing.

In 1959, a group of Moggs Creek residents erected a rough cairn of bricks, topped by a plaster bust, as a monument to the mythical Sir Samuel Moggs, alleged to be the first European to have landed at the location, on 29 February 1759.

== Geography ==
Moggs Creek itself rises in the wooded hills to the north, near Boonah. The settlement of the same name is at the mouth of Moggs Creek, which only runs into the ocean after periods of heavy rain.

The beach at Moggs Creek, unlike that at Aireys Inlet, is a long, uninterrupted sandy beach, running between Fairhaven in the east and Eastern View in the west. The shore is lined with sand dunes, covered in shrubbery, which separate the beach from the Great Ocean Road. Though that stretch of beach is usually wide and easily traversable, water can rise close to the dunes at high tide.

== Notable people ==
- Patrick Dangerfield, AFL footballer playing for the Geelong Football Club, and formerly the Adelaide Football Club
