= Urquharts Bluff =

Beach in Anglesea, Victoria, Australia

Urquharts Bluff Beach Guvvos Beach O'Donohues Beach Hutt Gully Beach Steps Beach
- Beach
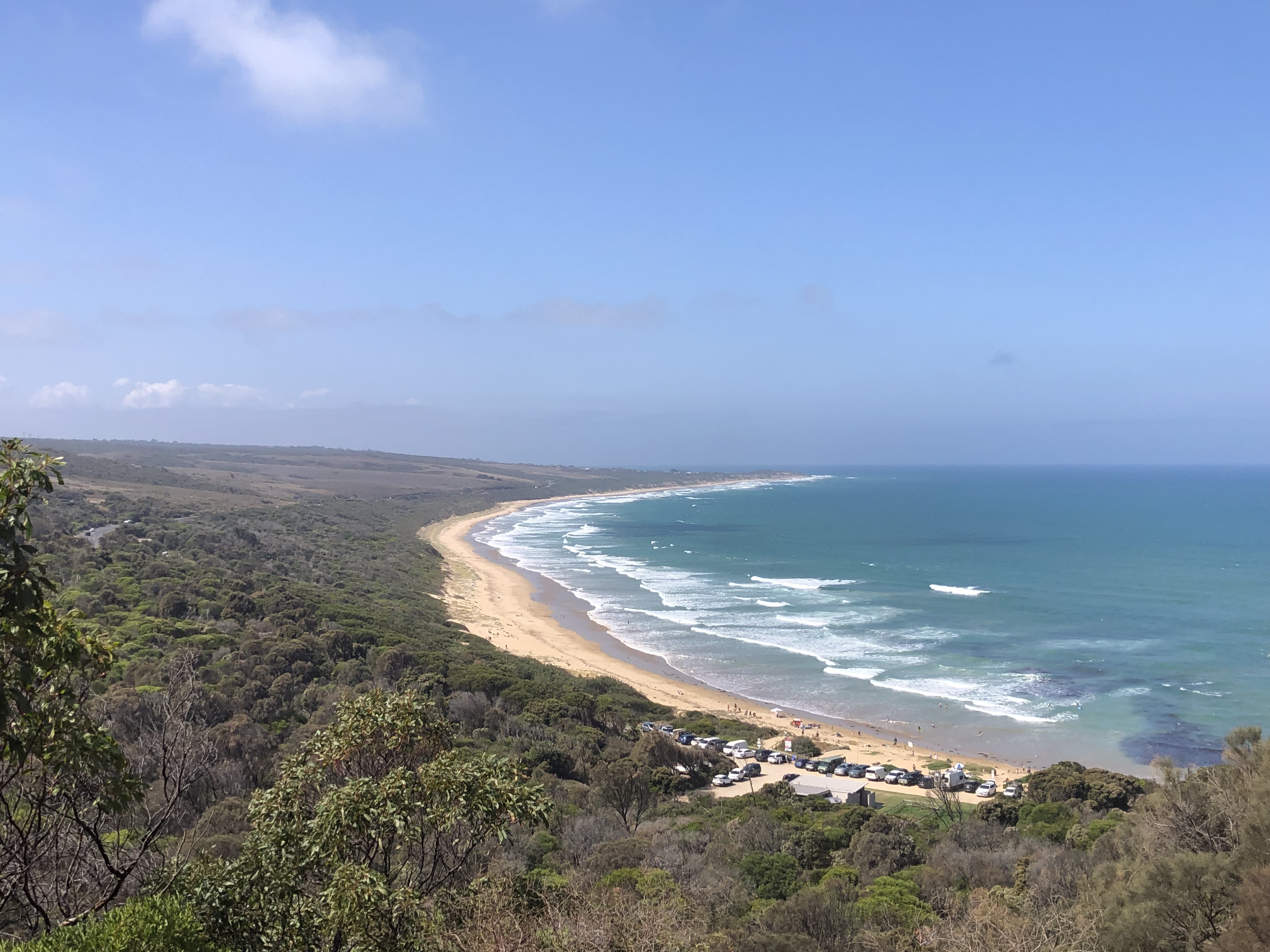
- Urquharts Bluff Beach
- Interactive map of Urquharts Bluff Beach
- Coordinates: 38°19′08″S 144°20′44″E
- Location: Anglesea, Victoria, Australia
- Water bodies: Lascelles Bay, Bass Strait

Dimensions
  - Length: 5 kilometres (3.1 mi)
- Hazard rating: 7/10 (highly hazardous)
- Access: Great Ocean Road

Urquharts Bluff is a coastal headland and beach located on the Great Ocean Road between Aireys Inlet and Anglesea in Victoria, Australia. Stretching for approximately 5 kilometres from Point Roadknight to the bluff itself, the beach is known for its rugged coastal scenery, rocky platforms, surf breaks and views of Lascelles Bay. The beach provides opportunities for walking, fishing, surfing and exploring rock pools, although its exposed conditions and strong currents can make it a hazardous swimming location. Parts of the beach have been given different names, including Steps Beach, Guvvos Beach, Hutt Gully Beach and O'Donohues Beach, named after adjacent features and surfbreaks.

== History ==
The area takes its name from William Urquhart, a land surveyor who established the first surveyed land boundaries in the district in 1846. Urquhart's work contributed to the early mapping and administration of land along this section of the Victorian coast.

By 1918, the original road serving the region ran more than a kilometre inland from the bluff and bypassed Aireys Inlet entirely. The route was considered unreliable due to its uneven surface and winding alignment, leading a local landowner to develop a shorter private coastal road approximately 13 kiloemtres in length. This road provided a more scenic and practical connection along the coastline, with motorists charged a toll between 1924 and 1930 to assist with maintenance costs before responsibility for toll collection transferred to the Great Ocean Road Trust.

The modern Great Ocean Road follows much of this coastal route, providing access to the beach and natural landscapes around the bluff. However, the road has remained vulnerable to coastal weather and erosion, with sections damaged by severe weather events, including the destruction of the road crossing at Hutt Gully following heavy rainfall in 1954.

In April 2008, an adult and three children were rescued by helicopter after becoming trapped by rising tides while attempting to walk along the coast between Urquharts Bluff and Aireys Inlet.

In January 2012, a woman died after being caught in a rip, while attempting to assist children caught in the surf. Several bystanders entered the water to assist the group, with emergency services including surf lifesavers and aircraft involved in the rescue response.

In January 2015, surf instructors rescued two teenage swimmers caught in a rip at Urquharts Bluff, with authorities stating that their actions likely prevented a drowning.

On 22 January 2021, a 58-year-old man drowned after his boat capsized off of O'Donohues Beach.

On New Years Day, 2024, 63-year-old Irish tourist John Holland drowned at the Hutt Gully section of the beach.

== Description ==
Urquharts Bluff Beach is a long, exposed beach characterised by fine sand, offshore reefs and energetic surf conditions. The beach receives average waves of approximately 1.3 metres, which contribute to the formation of a double-bar system along the shoreline. Rips frequently cut through the inner sandbar, while additional rips can occur across the outer bar during larger swells.

The beach is considered hazardous due to strong and persistent rip currents that extend along much of its length. A permanent rip located near the bluff car park has historically been associated with fatalities, and visitors are advised to exercise caution, particularly during periods of stronger winds and larger waves.

At the western end near the bluff, the beach is known as Steps, named after the access track descending from the bluff. This area contains several reef breaks that are popular with surfers, while other sections of the beach offer beach breaks that are most suitable during smaller to moderate swells and favourable wind conditions. The point and reef areas are also popular fishing locations, with permanent gutters and channels providing opportunities for anglers.

== See also ==
- Thirteenth Beach
- Torquay Surf Beach
- Torquay Front Beach
- Jan Juc Beach
- Great Ocean Road
