= Libby Coker =

Australian politician and journalist

Libby Coker MP
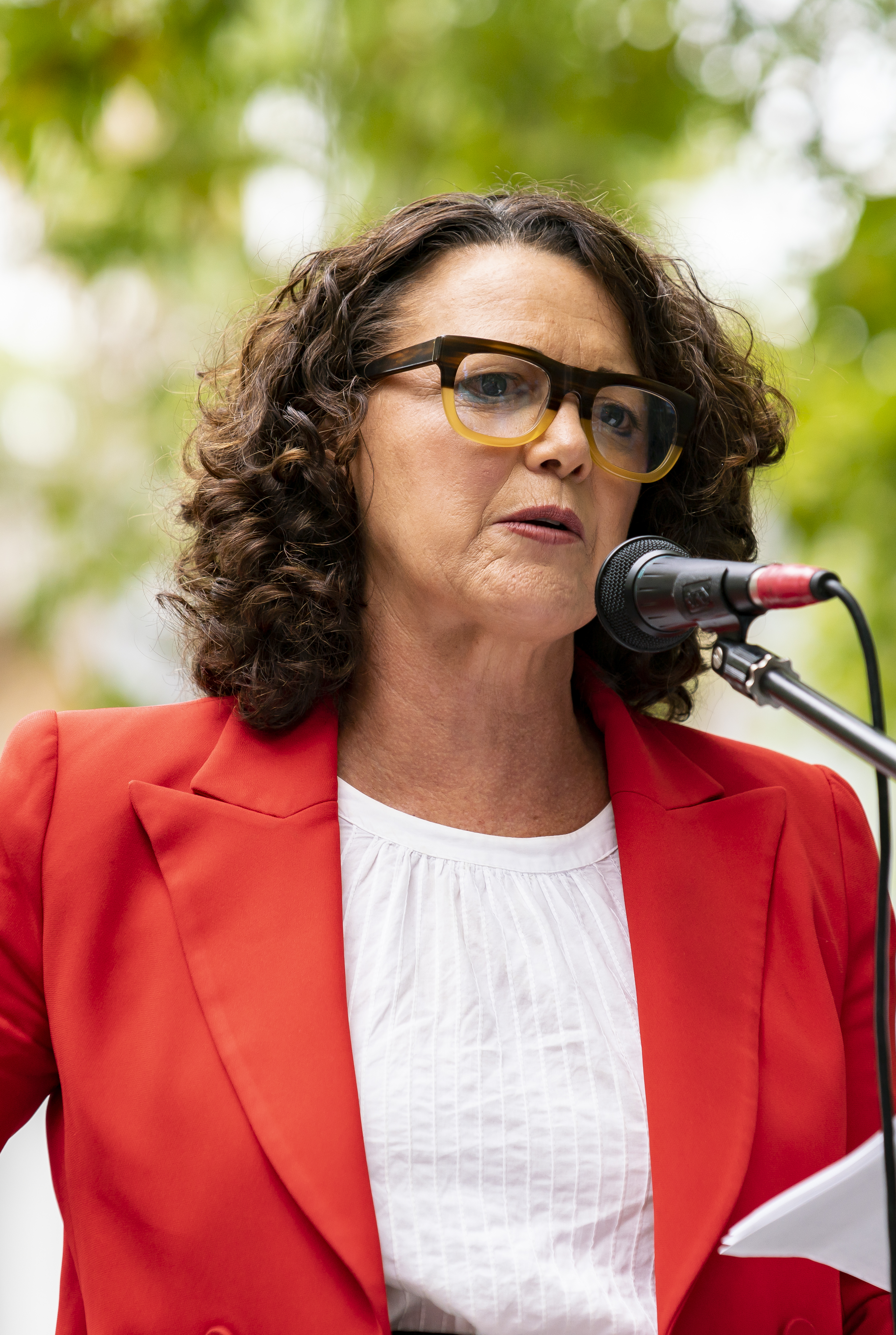
- Libby Coker in 2022.

Member of the Australian Parliament for Corangamite
- Incumbent
- Assumed office 18 May 2019
- Preceded by: Sarah Henderson

Councillor of the Surf Coast Shire for Anglesea Ward
- In office 29 November 2008 – 15 June 2019

Mayor of the Surf Coast Shire
- In office 2009–2010

Personal details
- Born: 11 June 1962 (age 64) Melbourne
- Party: Labor
- Education: University of New England; Monash University; Deakin University
- Profession: Teacher and journalist
- Website: libbycoker.com.au

Elizabeth Ann Coker (born 11 June 1962) is an Australian politician. She is a member of the Australian Labor Party (ALP) and has been a member of the House of Representatives since the 2019 federal election, representing the Victorian seat of Corangamite. She previously served as the mayor of the Surf Coast Shire. Coker won her seat in the 2022 Australian federal election with a 6.5-point swing to the ALP.

== Early life ==
Coker was born in Melbourne on 11 June 1962. Her mother Frances Mann worked as a nurse and her father Jack Coker was a senior public servant with the Australian Broadcasting Control Board. She grew up in the suburb of Beaumaris, later moving with her family to Port Macquarie, New South Wales where Coker's activism began.

In her first speech to parliament, Coker revealed she vandalised a real estate sign with her then-boyfriend in Port Macquarie, in an act of defiance against deforestation. She said she has "moved on" from spray-painting signs, but understands people who are frustrated by government inaction on climate change.

Coker holds a Bachelor of Arts from the University of New England and Bachelor of Letters from Deakin University, as well as a Diploma of Education from Monash University. Prior to entering politics, she worked briefly as a schoolteacher in outer Melbourne and held various positions in journalism, communications and public relations, including as a manager at the Victorian Department of Education. She completed a journalism cadetship at the Geelong Advertiser.

== Political career ==
=== Local government ===
Coker was first elected to the Surf Coast Shire council in 2008, for the Anglesea ward. She served as mayor between 2009 and 2010, and again from 2012 to 2013.

=== Federal ===
Coker won the ultra-marginal seat of Corangamite at the 2019 Australian federal election, defeating Liberal incumbent Sarah Henderson. Coker had unsuccessfully contested the seat at the 2016 Australian federal election. The 2022 Australian Federal Election was won by the Australian Labor Party (ALP), winning with 77 seats forming majority in the lower house. As a result, Coker won the ultra-marginal seat of Corangamite.

Following a redistribution of electoral boundaries in 2021 by the Australian Electoral Commission (AEC), Coker no longer resides in the electorate she represents. The coastal towns of Anglesea and Aireys Inlet, where she resides, are now incorporated into the Division of Wannon.

In March 2024, Coker called for a stop on plans to seismic blast the Otway Basin.

Australian House of Representatives
Preceded by Sarah Henderson	Member for Corangamite; 2019–present	Incumbent
