= Sunnymead Beach =

Beach in Aireys Inlet, Victoria, Australia

Sunnymead Beach Sunnymeade Beach
- Beach
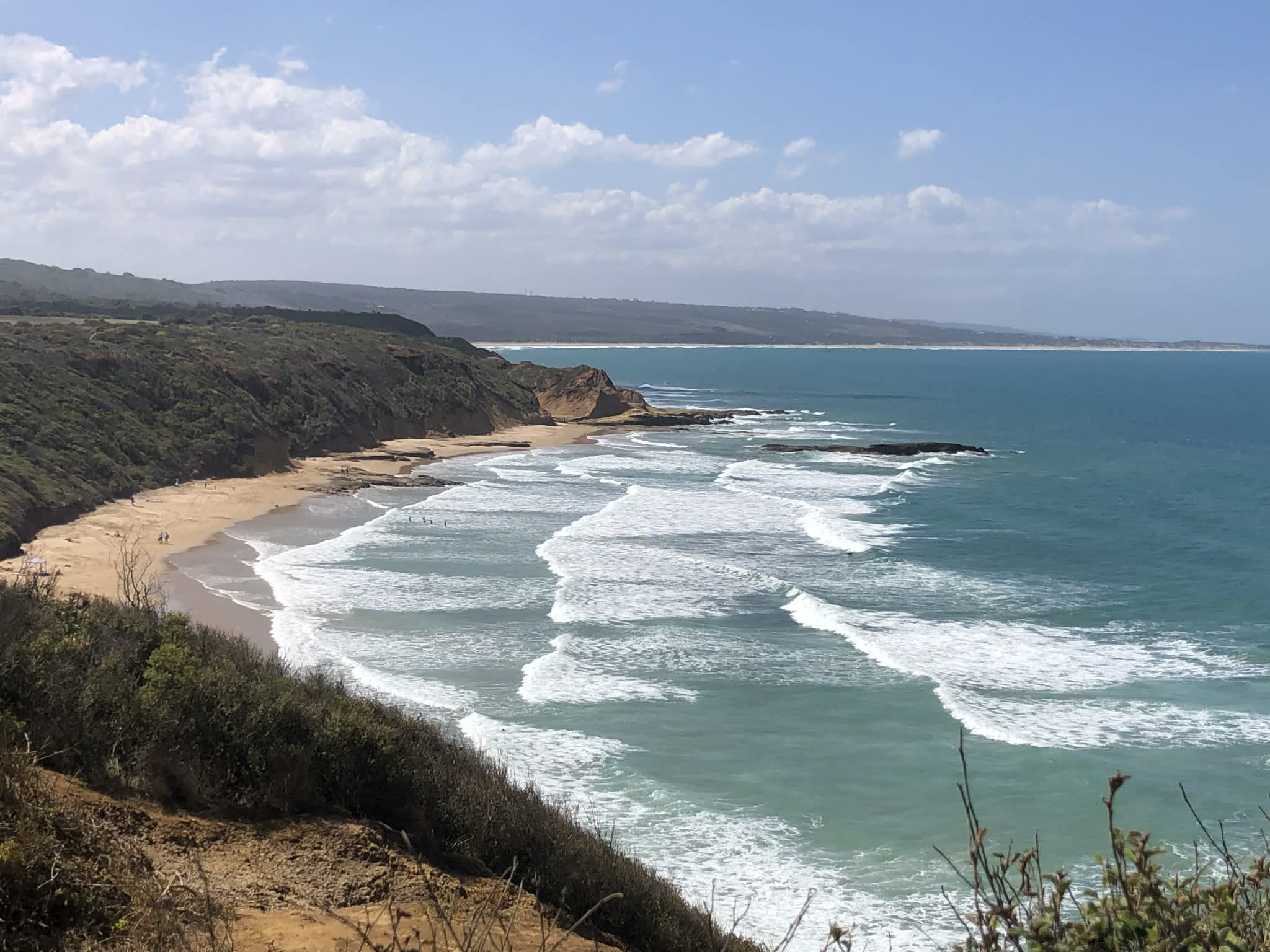
- Sunnymead Beach, March 2026
- Interactive map of Sunnymead Beach
- Coordinates: 38°26′55″S 144°07′13″E
- Location: Aireys Inlet, Victoria, Australia
- Water bodies: Bass Strait

Dimensions
  - Length: 0.5 kilometres (0.31 mi)
- Patrolled by: SLSA
- Hazard rating: 6/10 (moderately hazardous)
- Access: Boundary Road

Sunnymead Beach, alternatively spelled as Sunnymeade Beach is a small unpatrolled coastal beach along the Great Ocean Road, facing the Bass Strait in Aireys Inlet, Victoria, Australia. The beach is known for its secluded character, surrounding coastal cliffs and rock formations, and its relatively quiet atmosphere compared with other nearby beaches.

== History ==
The beach gets its name from 'Sunnymead', a 106-acre property that fronted the beach. The house was bought by Melbourne-based Charles Lane in 1909, who went on to spend most of his time at the house from 1913 until 1925. During this time, Charles built a bathing box on the beach.

In 1920, Lewis Grutzner bought an acre of land of the Sunnymead property after winning a game of cards, and built a house, known as 'The Shack' and a bathing box adjacent to Charles'. The bathing boxes remained after World War 2, until the 1960's, after being severely vandalised. Camping at the bottom of Boundary Road was popular during this postwar period, but has since been prohibited by the Shire.

On 10 March 2018, two people became stranded on a rock platform near Split Point Lighthouse during rough seas with an estimated two-metre swell. Lifesavers Alexander Buckley and Alex Schwarcz from Fairhaven Surf Life Saving Club responded using two rescue watercraft after being alerted by police via Life Saving Victoria communications. They reached the rock platform and found two individuals who were uninjured but unable to safely return to shore, including one person who could not swim. Personal flotation devices were provided and the pair were escorted through the surf to the rescue craft. The lifesavers then transported them to Sunnymead Beach, where both were assessed and found not to require further medical treatment.

== Geography and geology ==
The cliffs that back onto the beach are largely composed of shallow marine mudstone, sandstone and volcaniclastics, from the late Eocene to early Oligocene period, and are part of the Demons Bluff Group. Within this group, the Anglesea Member can be seen, which comprises basalt, tuff, lapilli tuff, quartz sand and gravel, clayey sand and clay. Much of the reefs (including Elephant Rock) and base layer of the cliffs is composed of basalt, which is overlaid by limestone. As these cliffs and rocks have eroded over time, a small natural arch has been formed, creating a small lagoon, known as the "Blowhole".

The cliffs are between 20 and 50 metres in height. The beach receives waves at an average height of 1.3 metres, with the swells typically producing right hand breaks. Sunnymead Beach is 500 metres in length and is dominated by reefs and several rips. A large reef known as "Elephant Rock" lies immediately off the beach. The beach is also popular with anglers.

== Access and features ==
A carpark is located at the top of the cliffs at the end of Boundary Road, from which a walking track leads down to the beach. Dogs are allowed on the beach, but must be on a leash. Toilets are available.

== See also ==
- Twelve Apostles (Victoria)
- Great Ocean Road
