= Fairhaven, Victoria =

Fairhaven
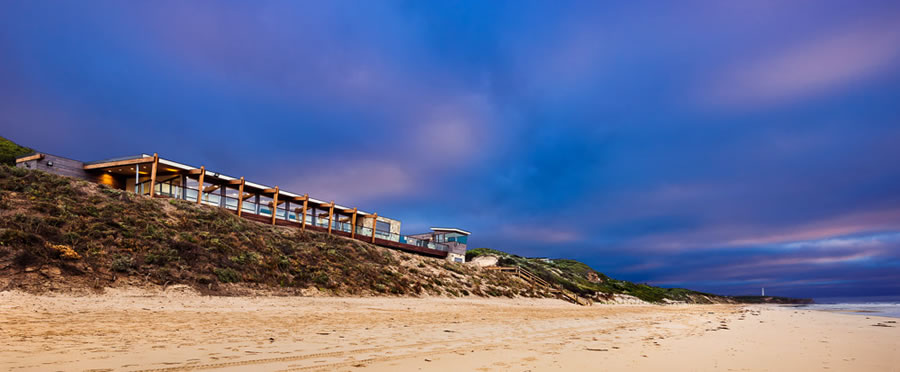
- The Fairhaven clubhouse, 2014

- Coordinates: 38°27′22″S 144°05′09″E
- Country: Australia
- State: Victoria
- LGA: Surf Coast Shire
- First People: Eastern Maar
- Location: 43 km (27 mi) SW of Geelong; 106 km (66 mi) SW of Melbourne

Government
  - State electorate: Polwarth
  - Federal division: Wannon

Population
  - Total: 390 (SAL 2021)
- Postcode: 3231
Localities around Fairhaven
Aireys Inlet	Aireys Inlet	Aireys Inlet
Moggs Creek	Fairhaven	Aireys Inlet
Bass Strait	Bass Strait	Bass Strait

Fairhaven is a town in the Surf Coast Shire, Victoria, Australia. In the 2021 census, Fairhaven had a population of 390 people.

The town is a popular holiday destination, with many homes being used for that purpose. It adjoins Fairhaven Beach, which at 6 km long is the longest beach on the Great Ocean Road. The town is separated from adjoining Aireys Inlet by the Painkalac Creek, and development in recent years has seen Fairhaven become increasingly joined to the Aireys Inlet township.

== History ==
The present site of Fairhaven was originally part of a pastoral run held by John Herd, who begun grazing cattle in the Lorne area in 1853. The run incorporated all the coastal area from Fairhaven to Lorne. It was later split in two, with the future Fairhaven township area confusingly being named Aireys Inlet.

A bridge was constructed aross Painkalac Creek in 1932, which resulted in the growth of the township. A guest house and camping ground were soon constructed, both bearing the name 'Fairhaven'. The construction of holiday houses began to increase after World War 2.

Fairhaven Beach is a popular surfing destination, and the Fairhaven Surf Lifesaving Club, which was founded in 1957, has been described as Fairhaven's "social centre". The club operated out of a volunteer-built clubhouse from 1960 until 2012, when the building was demolished to allow for the construction of a new modern one. Numerous delays saw the club operating out of shipping containers for more than a year, but a new clubhouse finally opened in December 2013. The locality was mentioned in the 1991 Hollywood blockbuster Point Break during the final portion of the movie on a radio weather warning for a cyclone whose eye was about to cross over the locality during the famed 50 year storm. In reality the area is around 1500 kilometres south of the zone in which a cyclone can form.

A local landmark is the Pole House, situated on a concrete column 40 metres above Fairhaven Beach. The original house, built in 1978, was demolished in 2013 after the owners thwarted a bid to list the building on the Victorian Heritage Register. In 2013–14, a house was rebuilt on the existing pole, to a modern design along similar lines. Better Homes and Gardens filmed a segment there for the opening of the replacement house in early 2014.

The Fairhaven area was badly damaged in the Ash Wednesday bushfires of 1983.
