= Eastern View =

- Town
- The Great Ocean Road Memorial Arch

- Coordinates: 38°27′12″S 144°02′35″E
- Country: Australia
- State: Victoria
- LGA: Surf Coast Shire
- Location: 10 km (6.2 mi) NE of Lorne; 44 km (27 mi) SW of Geelong; 108 km (67 mi) SW of Melbourne

Government
  - State electorate: Polwarth
  - Federal division: Wannon

Population
  - Total: 47 (SAL 2021)
- Postcode: 3231
Localities around Eastern View
Wensleydale; Boonah	Wensleydale	Aireys Inlet
Boonah	Eastern View	Moggs Creek
Big Hill	Bass Strait	Bass Strait

Eastern View is a locality in the Surf Coast Shire, Victoria, Australia.

== History ==
The area was first settled by Jonas Hollingworth, who had selected land here in 1879, and named the area Eastern View. He initially sold wattle bark for tanning leather, and once land was cleared, began to run a dairy farm which remained in his family for a considerable amount of time.

Eastern View was a remote coastal area prior to the construction of the Great Ocean Road, which was opened to Eastern View, albeit in the form of a narrow gravel track, in March 1922. Only four houses were located in the area in 1924; a fifth was later extended and granted a liquor license as the Eastern View Hotel in 1927. The hotel owners later leased land on the ocean side of the Great Ocean Road and built a tennis court. The Eastern View Hotel was a popular tourist destination for many years, but closed in 1957. The Great Ocean Road Trust developed a nine-hole golf course at Eastern View in 1936. It closed at the beginning of World War II, and did not reopen. Both the former hotel building and the remnants of the golf course were destroyed in the Ash Wednesday bushfires in 1983.

Eastern View Post Office opened on 1 July 1927, replacing a receiving office that had been open since 17 November 1924. It closed on 31 December 1967. A tollgate on the Great Ocean Road operated at Eastern View until the abolition of tolls when the Great Ocean Road Trust wound up and transferred control of the road to the state government in 1936. It was proposed in 1940 to rename the town "Herschell", in honour of the long-time chair of the former Trust, but this met with local resistance and did not occur.

The Great Ocean Road Arch, which is located in the area, is a prominent landmark of the Great Ocean Road, and marks its official gateway. It was first opened in 1939, and has been rebuilt three times: in 1974, after the Country Roads Board found the original too low and narrow, in 1983, after it burned down in the Ash Wednesday bushfires, and again in the 1990s, after it was damaged by a mini-cyclone. The arch commemorates those who died in World War I.

Grass Creek (formerly Grassy Creek) runs through the west of the town. The Black Stump Roadhouse and a caravan park were located there during the 1950s. The Christian Brothers later purchased 25 acres in the area, and established the Santa Monica Camp. The original camp was destroyed in the Ash Wednesday bushfires, but has since been rebuilt. A construction camp was built nearby at Point Castries (now Cinema Point) to accommodate workers building the Great Ocean Road.

Eastern View today consists of a small strip of houses along the Great Ocean Road between the beach and the Great Otway National Park. The Cinema Point lookout is also located at Eastern View.
