= Point Roadknight Beach =

Beach in Anglesea, Victoria, Australia

- Beach
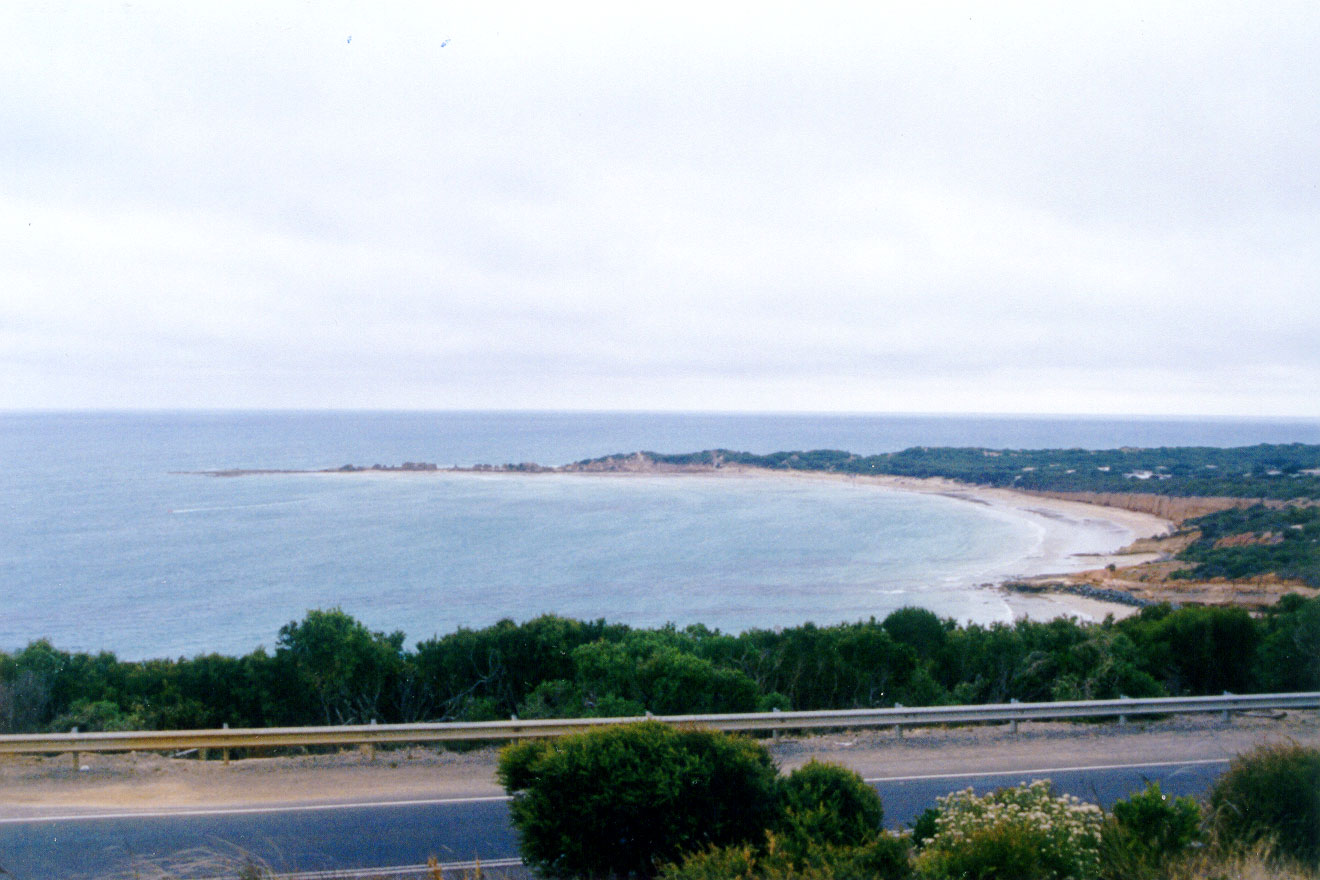
- Point Roadknight Beach
- Interactive map of Point Roadknight Beach
- Coordinates: 38°25′30″S 144°10′45″E
- Location: Anglesea, Victoria, Australia
- Water bodies: Bass Strait

Dimensions
  - Length: 0.7 kilometres (0.43 mi)
- Hazard rating: 4/10 (moderately hazardous)
- Access: Melba Parade, Eighth Avenue

Point Roadknight Beach is a beach located in Anglesea on Victoria's Surf Coast, Australia. Situated along the Great Ocean Road, the beach is known for its sheltered waters, scenic rocky formations and family-friendly conditions. The natural projection of Point Roadknight and its surrounding reef system provide protection from larger ocean swells, making it one of the calmer beaches in the Anglesea area.

== Description ==
Point Roadknight Beach is approximately 700 metres long and faces northeast, lying between Soapy Rocks and the Point Roadknight headland. Visitors are advised to take care around Soapy Rocks, as the slippery surfaces can create a hazard for those walking across them.

The sheltered nature of the bay results in relatively small waves, generally averaging less than one metre in height. These conditions create a continuous shallow sandbar and mean that rips are uncommon under normal conditions. The beach is regarded as one of the safest swimming locations in the Anglesea region and is patrolled by lifesavers during the Christmas holiday period.

Point Roadknight is popular among families, beginner surfers and those seeking a quieter beach experience. The small and consistent waves make it suitable for people learning to surf, while the calm waters are also used for activities such as paddleboarding. Surfing conditions are generally limited due to the small wave size.

The beach is also used for boating and fishing, with access provided through a boat ramp and facilities associated with the Anglesea Motor Yacht Club. Fishing is generally more productive from the rocky point rather than directly from the beach. The site includes a large car park and accessible connections between the car park and boat ramp.

== History ==
Since 1962 the shoreline of the beach has retreated by roughly 6 metres. A small area of erosion, with around 13 metres displaced, has been observed near the intersection of 6th Avenue, with this occurring between the years of 1983 to 2005, with the shoreline either remaining stable or retreating slowly since.

A landslide in an area of 200 metres towards Soapy Rock occurred in December 1973, with the top of the cliffs moving a further 20 metres inland. Further reinforcement has been applied through the construction of drains to channel surface water run-off, and retaining walls at the base of the cliffs.

Dune planting has occurred on the beach's southern foreshore since 1988, with the shoreline there retreating up to 20 metres seaward. The stable dune that formed measured 4 metres in height and 3 metres in length.

The beach has been home to the annual Rock2Ramp Ocean Swim, which takes place in December, and began in 1995.

== See also ==
- Lorne Beach
- Thirteenth Beach
- Torquay Surf Beach
- Torquay Front Beach
- Jan Juc Beach
- Great Ocean Road
