= The Pole House =

- Interactive map of the The Pole House area

General information
- Location: 60 Banool Road, Fairhaven, VIC 3231, Fairhaven, Victoria, Australia
- Coordinates: 38°28′3.96″S 144°4′45.83″E
- Elevation: 40 m (130 ft)
- Construction started: 1972
- Completed: 1978
- Renovated: 2014
- Landlord: Great Ocean Road Holidays

Technical details
- Floor count: 1
- Floor area: 64 sq m

Design and construction
- Architect: Frank Dixon

Renovating team
- Architect: Franco Fiorentini
- Renovating firm: F2 Architecture

The Pole House is an architecturally designed stilt house located in Fairhaven, Victoria, Australia. Best known for its protruding location 40 metres above the Great Ocean Road, the house boasts 200-degree views of Bass Strait and has been described as one of Australia's most photographed properties. It is open to the public as holiday rental accommodation, where nightly prices start at almost A$1,000.

== History ==
The house was first conceptualised by architectural engineer Frank Dixon in 1963, who dreamed up the idea after a surfing accident that prompted his imagination across a six-week period of injury. By 1965, Dixon and his wife Aileen had purchased the land upon which the house would be built.

Dixon was inspired by the Chemosphere, and designed a building of similar grandiosity that took full advantage of the location's natural beauty. He began work on the house in 1972 and completed it in 1978. The house fell partial victim to the Ash Wednesday bushfires of 1983, which caused the rear of the building to be rebuilt a year later.

Originally constructed as a wooden house perched upon a 15-metre pole, the building grew fragile due over the decades due to its exposure to the elements. Dixon sold the house to new owners Kathi and Ray Adams for A$1,750,000 in 2005. The following year, it was made available to the public as a holiday rental for the first time. In June 2012, Kathi Adams announced that the house would be demolished and replaced, planning a new design that would "take advantage of the million-dollar sea views".

One month later Dixon made an application to the Victorian Heritage Council to have the building included on its register, thereby preventing its imminent demolition; the application was subsequently rejected. The original dwelling was demolished in January 2013 and replaced with a new build designed by Franco Fiorentini, who utilised glass and steel alongside floor-to-ceiling windows for the new structure. It was unveiled in February 2014.

The house, which is accessible via a 23-metre floating walkway, sits upon a 70-centimetre-thick slab which supports the building atop the pole. The structure is designed to sway in the wind, and can move as much as 15 centimetres each way.
