= Split Point Lighthouse =

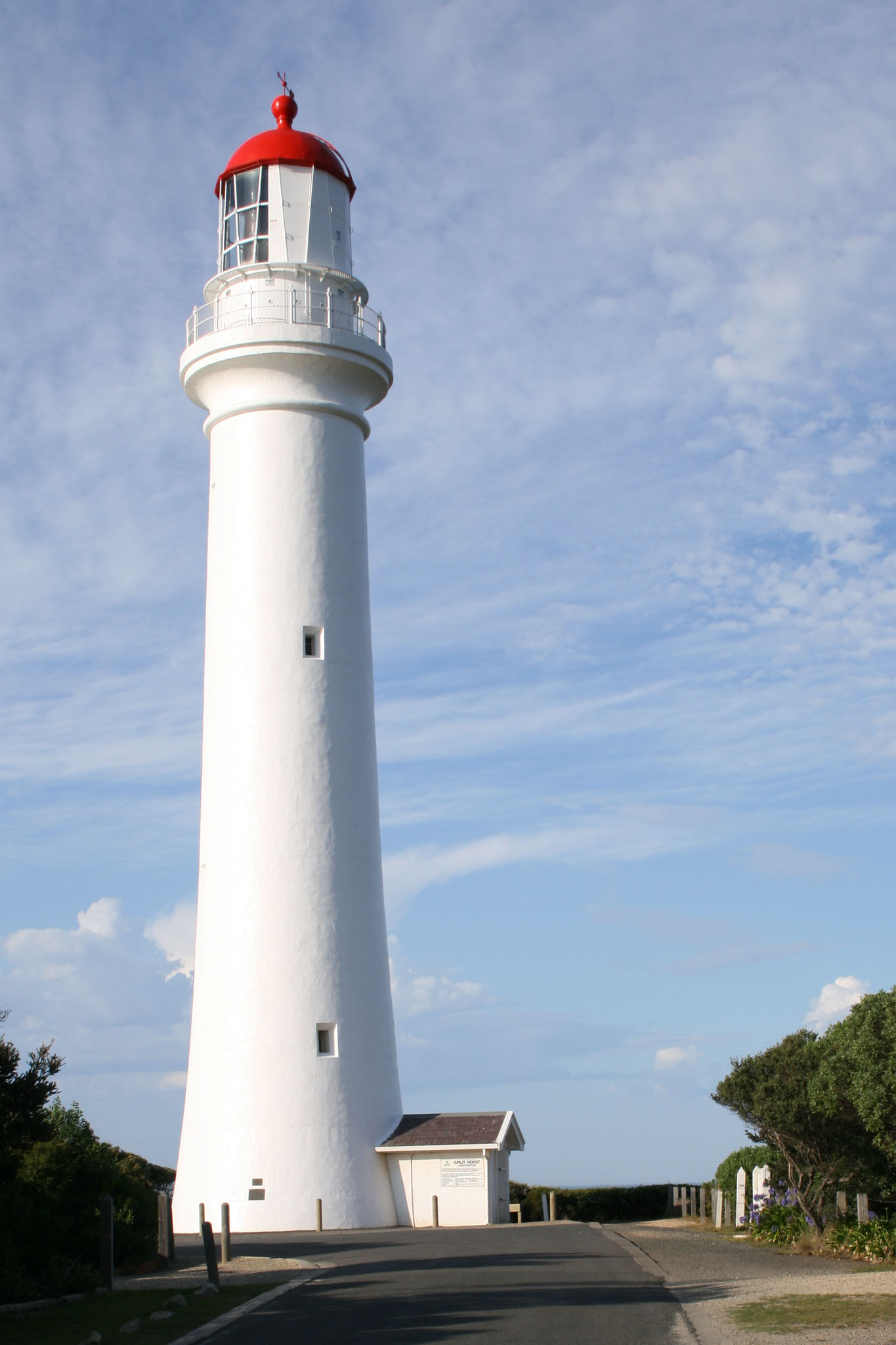
- Location: Aireys Inlet; Victoria; Australia
- Coordinates: 38°28′04.7″S 144°6′16.1″E

Tower
- Constructed: 1891
- Construction: concrete, rendered with cement tower
- Automated: 1919
- Height: 34 metres (112 ft)
- Shape: tapered cylindrical tower
- Markings: white tower and lantern, red roof
- Power source: mains electricity
- Operator: Australian Maritime Safety Authority
- Heritage: listed on the Victorian Heritage Register

Light
- First lit: 1891
- Focal height: 66 metres (217 ft)
- Lens: 1st order Fresnel
- Intensity: white: 116,000 cd red: 23,000 cd
- Range: white 20 nautical miles (37 km; 23 mi) red 16 nautical miles (30 km; 18 mi)
- Characteristic: Fl (4) W 20s.

Split Point Lighthouse is a lighthouse located in Aireys Inlet, a small town on the Great Ocean Road, Victoria, Australia.

== History ==
Originally called Eagles Nest Point, the lighthouse was constructed in 1891. For 27 years, three lighthouse keepers worked at this remote location, ensuring the light was operating well and communicating with ships via a number of code systems. The lighthouse still has its original construction with a wonderful staircase and timber fittings. The lantern still operates having had more than three different light sources over its history. The tower was converted to automatic operation in 1919, using acetylene gas to provide the illumination. It was upgraded to electric operation in 1972. The keepers' cottages and stables form an intrinsic part of the lighthouse precinct.

The original British-made Chance Brothers first order Fresnel lens is still in use. However, the factory near Birmingham, England, where the lens was built, was bombed during war-time and the essential formula for making the unique lens crystal was lost, should a replacement ever be needed. The fixed-light lantern still lights the way for thousands of vessels using a combination of lighting colors. Under standard Australian lighthouse convention, red filters would usually be placed to the extreme left and right of the beam (indicating "danger zones" for a passing ship, in-line with the jagged coastline). For reasons unknown, the Split Point Lighthouse operated for a number of years under the opposite system; although this has now been corrected. The Split Point lighthouse is 34 metres tall and stands 66 metres above sea level.

== Today ==
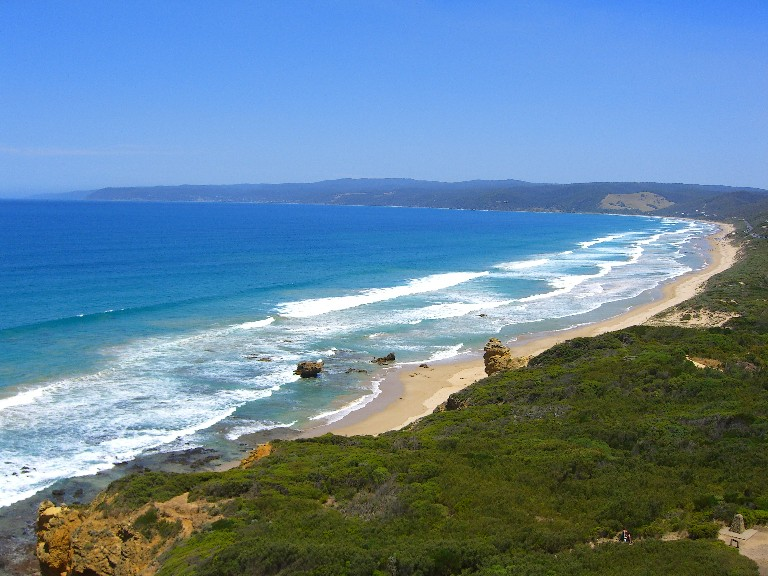
The view from the top of the lighthouse

The Split Point lighthouse is located in Federal Street, Aireys Inlet, and helps to guide ships and other craft along the Victorian coast between Cape Otway and the entrance to Port Philip at Point Lonsdale. The lighthouse is easily accessible from the Great Ocean Road.

Since summer 2005, a commercial operator has been offering regular tours, during which visitors have the chance to climb the staircase and experience the view from the balcony outside the lantern room, offering a 360-degree view of the stunning coast. Four landings on the staircase provide stops along the way up and make for an accessible climb. Old photographs highlight shipwrecks, the lives of the keepers, and the construction of the Great Ocean Road.

The lighthouse is open every day. Tours can be self-guided or led by trained staff (pre-booked) who tell stories of the lighthouse keepers and early shipwrecks, explain the operation of the light and communication systems, and introduce thousands of Round the Twist fans to the filming operations at this lighthouse.

The original lighthouse keepers' quarters, two detached houses adjacent to the tower, are now privately owned residences. The original stables and work room are now a cafe.

== Popular culture ==
In the popular children's television series Round the Twist, the Twist family live in the lighthouse; however, the inside of the lighthouse depicted in the show is a set. It features prominently as the scene of a murder in Arthur Upfield's detective novel The New Shoe, featuring his famous detective Napoleon Bonaparte. The lighthouse was also featured in the 2003 film Darkness Falls, and episodes of MasterChef Australia and Travel Guides (2022) were filmed there. The lighthouse is regularly filmed for tourism and advertising purposes, and it is the location for marriage proposals and weddings.

It was also featured in the music video for "Lydia Wears a Cross" by singer Julia Jacklin.

== Gallery ==
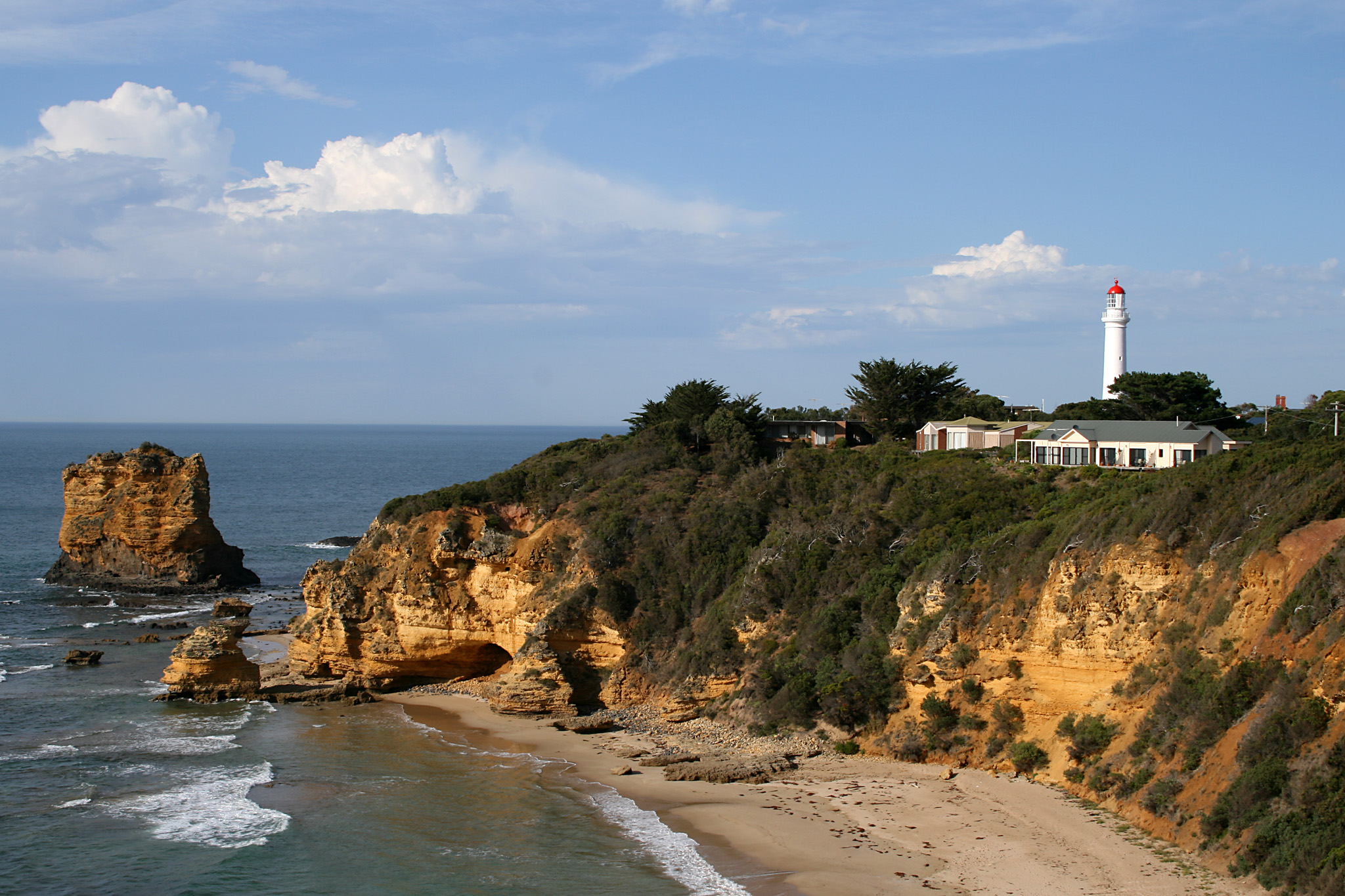
Split Point lighthouse, eagle rock

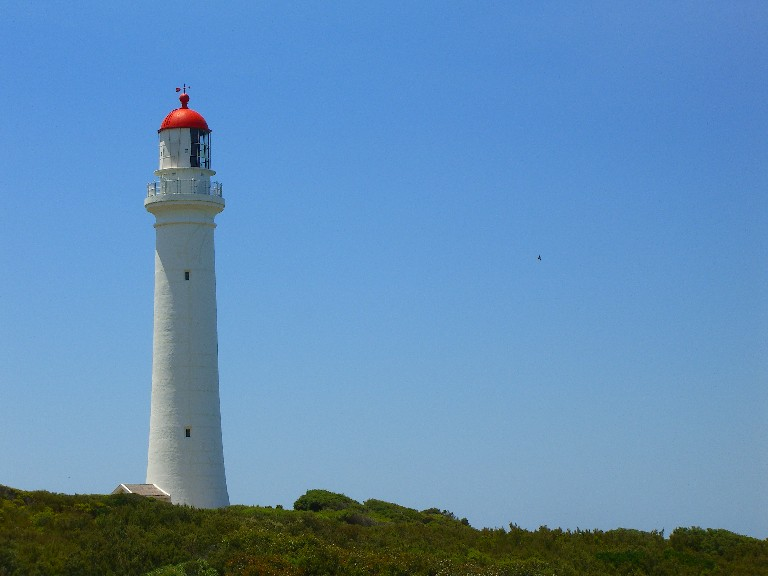
The area leading down to the surrounding cliffs

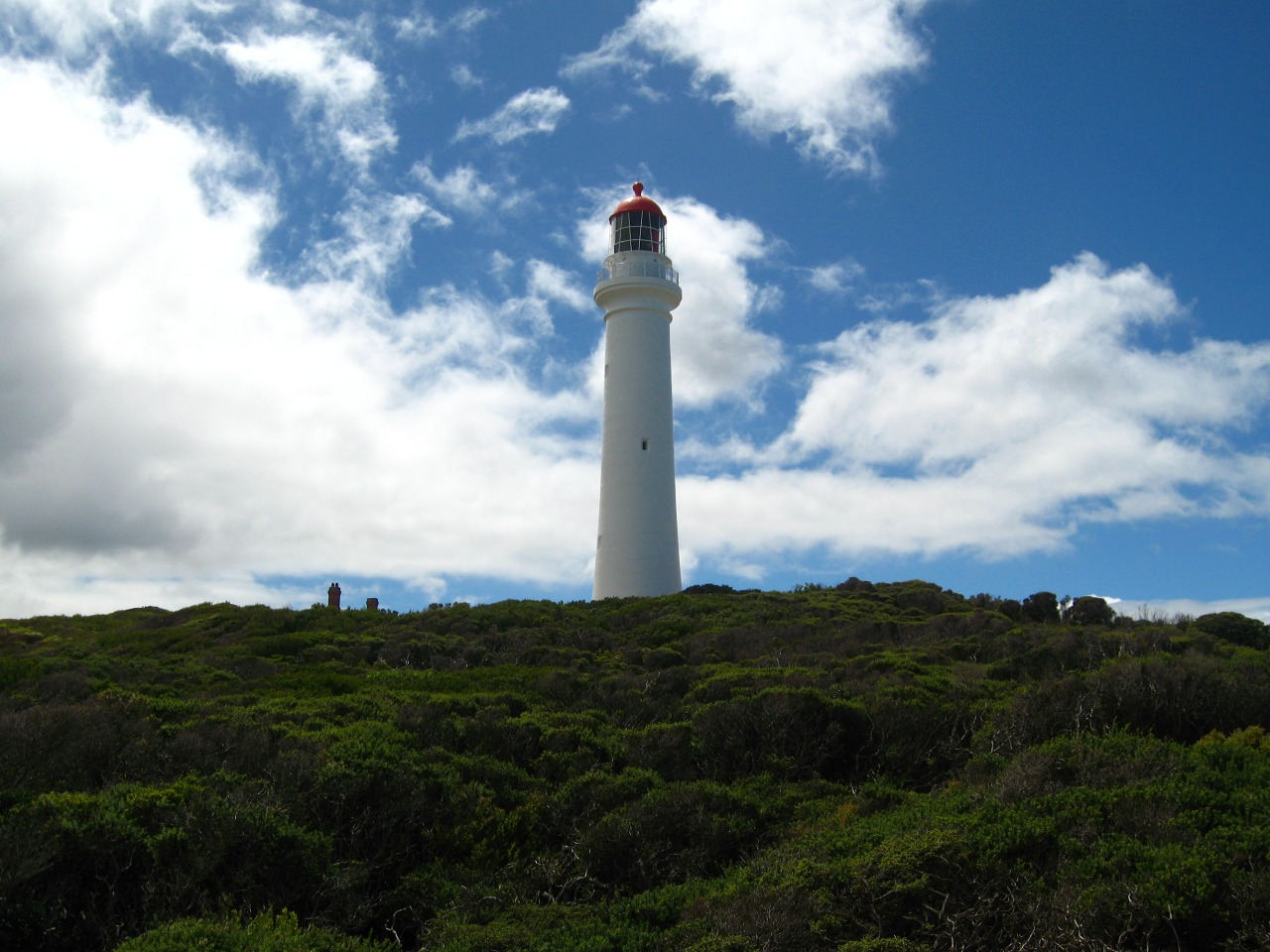
Split Point Lighthouse

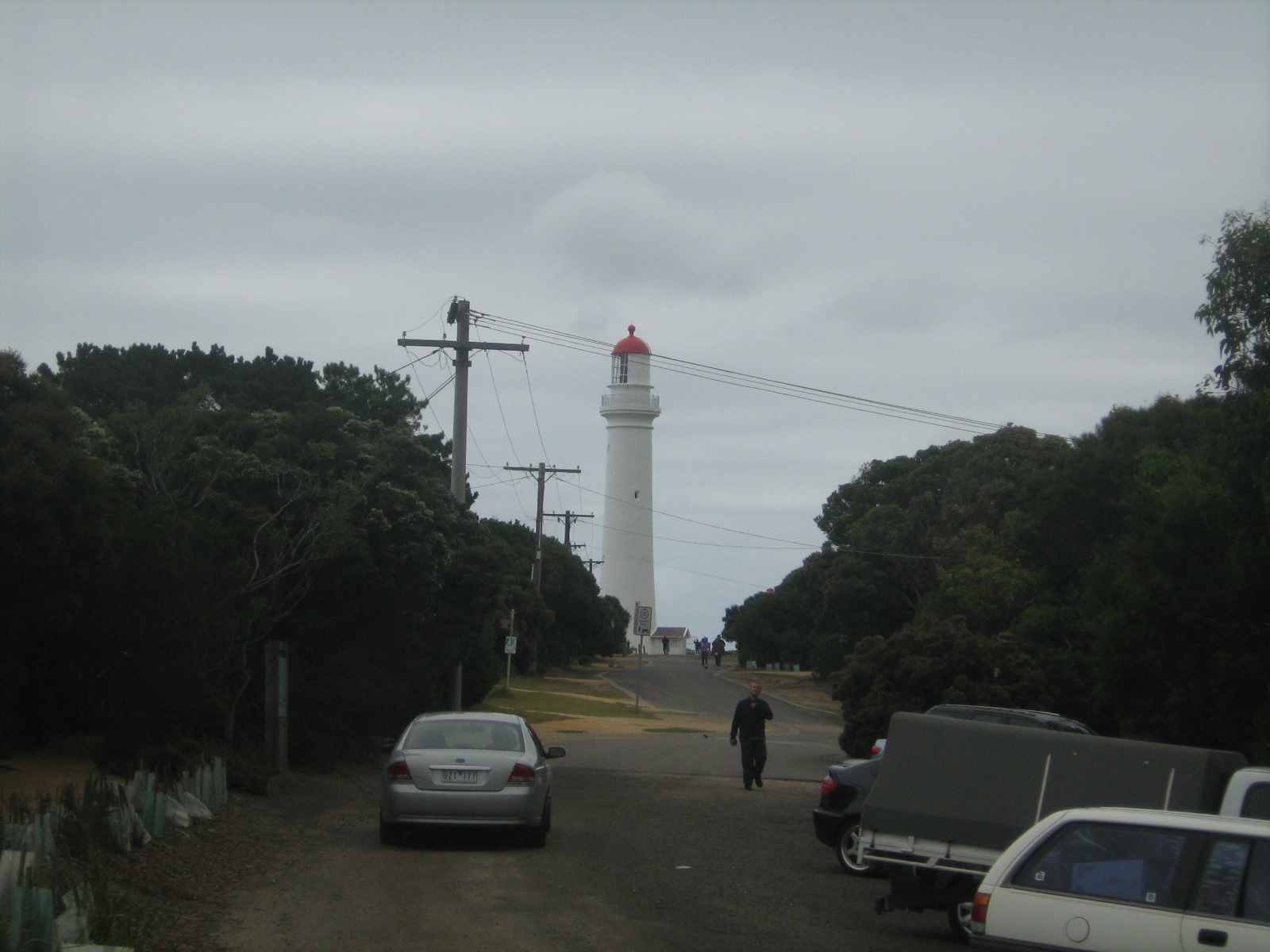
Split Point Lighthouse

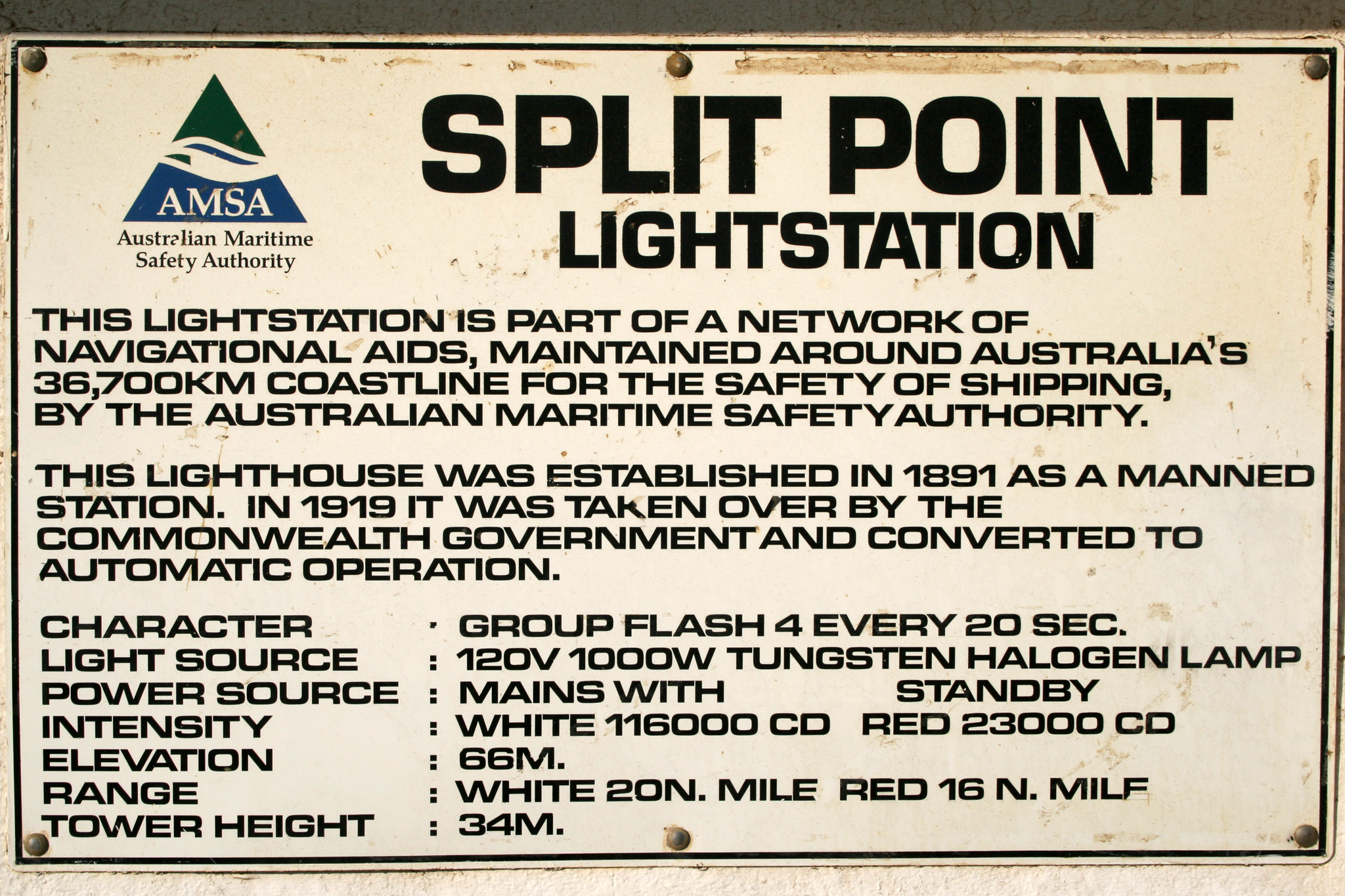
Explanatory table

== See also ==
- List of lighthouses in Australia
