= Anglesea River =

Perennial river in Victoria, Australia

Anglesea Deep Gully, Marshy Creek, Salt Gully
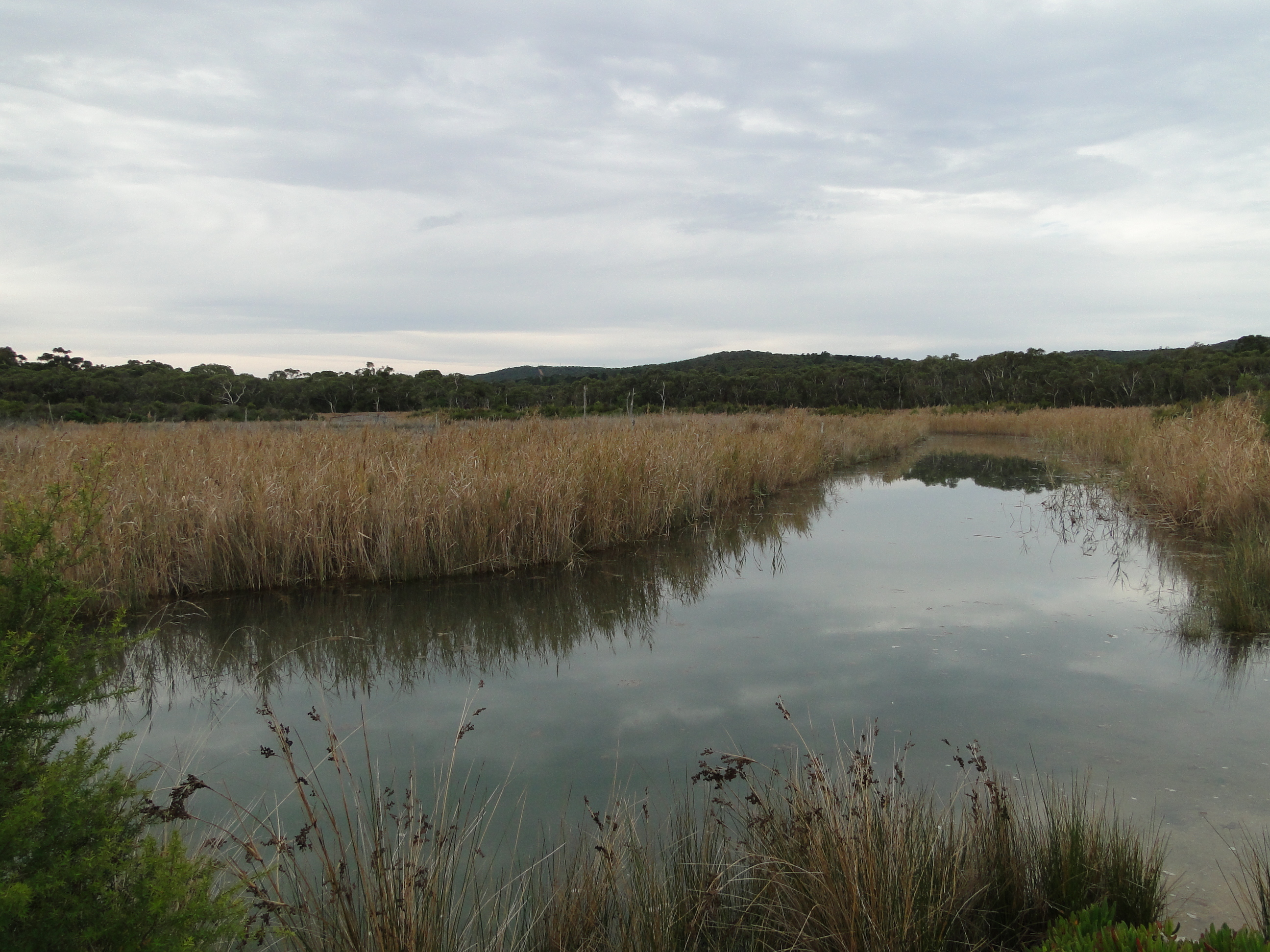
- Anglesea River estuary. Photo taken in Coogoorah Park, Anglesea, Victoria, Australia

- Location of the Anglesea River mouth in Victoria
- Etymology: After Anglesey, an island in Wales.
- Native name: Kuarka-dorla (Wathawurrung)

Location
- Country: Australia
- State: Victoria
- Region: South East Coastal Plain (IBRA), The Otways
- Local government area: Surf Coast Shire

Physical characteristics
- Source: Otway Ranges
  - location: east of Winchelsea
  - coordinates: 38°23′44″S 144°10′59″E
- Mouth: Bass Strait
  - location: Anglesea
  - coordinates: 38°24′55″S 144°11′35″E
  - elevation: 0 m (0 ft)

Basin features
- River system: Corangamite catchment
- National park: Great Otway National Park

The Anglesea River is a perennial river of the Corangamite catchment, in the Otways region of the Australian state of Victoria.

== Location and features ==
The Anglesea River rises in the Otway Ranges east of Winchelsea and flows generally east by south before reaching its mouth and emptying into Bass Strait near the town of the same name.

== Etymology ==
In the Aboriginal Australian Wathawurrung language the name for the river is Kuarka-dorla, meaning "place to catch mullet".

The river was named after Anglesey, an island in Wales.

== See also ==
- Anglesea Recreation & Sports Club
- List of rivers of Australia § Victoria
