= Aireys Inlet =

- Town
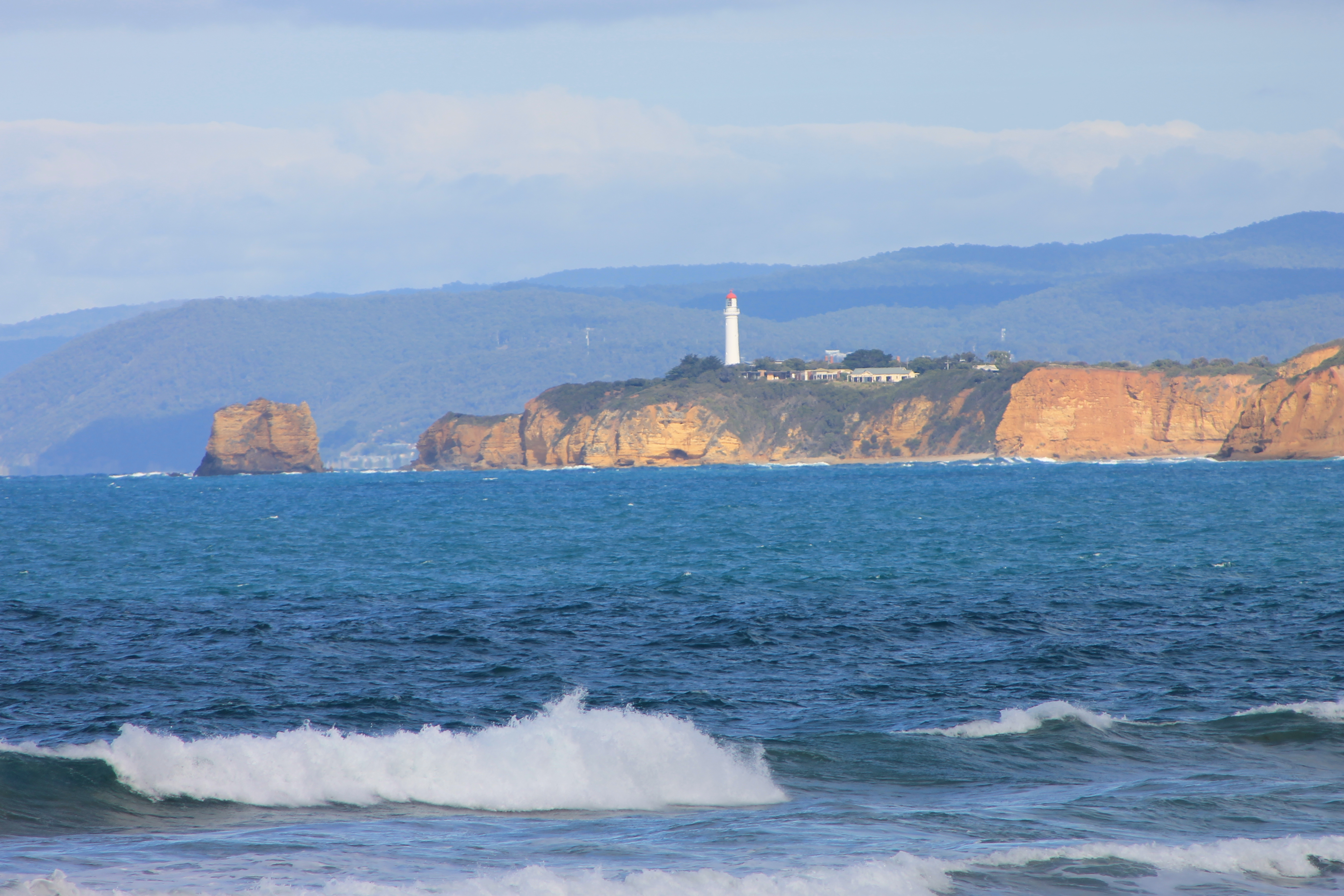
- Panorama of Aireys Inlet with Lighthouse in background

- Coordinates: 38°28′S 144°06′E
- Country: Australia
- State: Victoria
- LGA: Surf Coast Shire
- Location: 119 km (74 mi) from Melbourne; 46 km (29 mi) from Geelong; 28 km (17 mi) from Torquay

Government
  - State electorate: Polwarth
  - Federal division: Wannon
- Elevation: 95 m (312 ft)

Population
  - Total: 979 (2021 census)
- Postcode: 3231
- Mean max temp: 18.4 °C (65.1 °F)
- Mean min temp: 10.7 °C (51.3 °F)
- Annual rainfall: 618.1 mm (24.33 in)
Localities around Aireys Inlet
Wensleydale	Anglesea	Anglesea
Eastern View	Aireys Inlet	Bass Strait
Moggs Creek	Fairhaven	Bass Strait

Aireys Inlet is a town located on the Great Ocean Road, southwest of Melbourne, Victoria, Australia. Aireys Inlet is located between Anglesea and Lorne, and joined with Fairhaven, Moggs Creek, and Eastern View to the west.

Many surfers holiday in Aireys Inlet to take advantage of the popular Fairhaven beach. As the inclination of the beach can change dramatically between years, the surf is regarded as unpredictable. Swimmers should take note there is a strong rip current.

Painkalac Creek, which separates Aireys Inlet from Fairhaven, forms a salt lake or inlet behind the sand dunes before it cuts through to the ocean. Due to low water levels in the inlet it is not often that the inlet breaks through.

Aireys Inlet is also famous for Split Point Lighthouse which was featured in the popular children's TV show Round The Twist.

There is also a horseshoe-shaped reef at Step Beach which forms an excellent swimming hole at low tide. The town's main attraction, the Split Point Lighthouse, overlooks the inlet. The lighthouse has made Aireys Inlet an icon along the Great Ocean Road.

North-east of the township lies the secluded Sunnymead Beach.

== History ==
In the early 19th century, before British settlement, the escaped convict William Buckley lived here in a primitive hut eating fish, shellfish, wild raspberries and sugar ants. Aireys Inlet was known to the Aboriginals of the time as Managwhawz. The town takes its current name from John Moore Cole Airey, who settled in the area in 1842. His holding included the coastal land between present-day Anglesea and Aireys Inlet.

This pastoral run, known as 'Angahook', later became the parish name. A homestead was constructed on the property. Ownership later passed to Thomas Pearse, who lived there from 1852 until his death in 1862. His grave, alongside his wife Martha, is located beneath Split Point Lightouse, marked by a cairn. Pearse's partner, Robert McConachy, resided in the Bark Hut, within the Allen Noble Sanctuary. Both the homestead and the original bark hut were destroyed in the Ash Wednesday bushfires, but the bark hut has since been restored.

The area was opened up for sale, with several allotments created within the 'Eagle Hawk Estate' in the late 1880s, after a railway line to nearby Wensleydale made access easier.

Split Point Lighthouse was built in 1891, and interest in the region thence increased. The Post Office opened on 1 April 1893. Land surrounding the lighhouse and the lightkeepers' cottages were subdivided and sold in 1936.

== Population ==
At the 2021 census, Aireys Inlet had a population of 979. 79.7% of people were born in Australia and 88.3% of people only spoke English at home. The most common responses for religion were No Religion 62.3% and Catholic 13.8%.

== Geography ==
Fairhaven, Moggs Creek, and Eastern View are in the same postal area as Aireys Inlet.

== Climate ==
Aireys Inlet possesses an oceanic climate (Köppen: Cfb), with tepid, relatively dry summers and mild, wetter winters. Average maxima vary from 23.1 °C (73.6 °F) in January and February to 13.4 °C (56.1 °F) in July while average minima fluctuate between 14.7 °C (58.5 °F) in February and 7.3 °C (45.1 °F) in July. Mean precipitation is moderately low (averaging 618.1 mm (24.33 in) per annum), but rainfall is frequent, as Aireys Inlet receives 152.1 precipitation days annually (with a maximum frequency of rain in winter). Extreme temperatures have ranged from 45.3 °C (113.5 °F) on 7 February 2009 to 0.0 °C (32.0 °F) on 28 July 1990.

Climate data for Aireys Inlet (38.46°S 144.09°E, 105 m AMSL) (1990-2024 normals & extremes)
Month	Jan	Feb	Mar	Apr	May	Jun	Jul	Aug	Sep	Oct	Nov	Dec	Year
Record high °C (°F)	43.5 (110.3)	45.3 (113.5)	40.7 (105.3)	34.6 (94.3)	27.8 (82.0)	21.1 (70.0)	20.6 (69.1)	25.4 (77.7)	31.5 (88.7)	36.6 (97.9)	38.9 (102.0)	44.7 (112.5)	45.3 (113.5)
Mean daily maximum °C (°F)	23.1 (73.6)	23.1 (73.6)	21.8 (71.2)	19.1 (66.4)	16.3 (61.3)	13.9 (57.0)	13.4 (56.1)	14.4 (57.9)	16.3 (61.3)	18.2 (64.8)	19.8 (67.6)	21.5 (70.7)	18.4 (65.1)
Mean daily minimum °C (°F)	14.2 (57.6)	14.7 (58.5)	13.7 (56.7)	11.6 (52.9)	9.9 (49.8)	8.2 (46.8)	7.3 (45.1)	7.5 (45.5)	8.3 (46.9)	9.5 (49.1)	11.0 (51.8)	12.3 (54.1)	10.7 (51.2)
Record low °C (°F)	6.8 (44.2)	7.5 (45.5)	6.7 (44.1)	4.4 (39.9)	3.9 (39.0)	1.3 (34.3)	0.0 (32.0)	2.2 (36.0)	2.6 (36.7)	2.0 (35.6)	4.5 (40.1)	6.1 (43.0)	0.0 (32.0)
Average precipitation mm (inches)	42.7 (1.68)	31.3 (1.23)	36.4 (1.43)	46.0 (1.81)	54.9 (2.16)	59.1 (2.33)	66.3 (2.61)	63.6 (2.50)	56.7 (2.23)	63.7 (2.51)	57.7 (2.27)	39.6 (1.56)	618.1 (24.33)
Average precipitation days (≥ 0.2 mm)	8.0	6.5	9.9	12.4	14.3	15.2	17.9	17.4	15.6	14.0	11.2	9.7	152.1
Average afternoon relative humidity (%)	65	65	65	66	72	75	73	70	66	64	65	64	67
Average dew point °C (°F)	12.7 (54.9)	13.3 (55.9)	12.0 (53.6)	10.1 (50.2)	9.5 (49.1)	8.1 (46.6)	7.2 (45.0)	7.1 (44.8)	7.6 (45.7)	8.2 (46.8)	10.1 (50.2)	11.1 (52.0)	9.7 (49.6)
Source: Bureau of Meteorology (1990-2024 normals & extremes)

=== Beaches and coastline ===
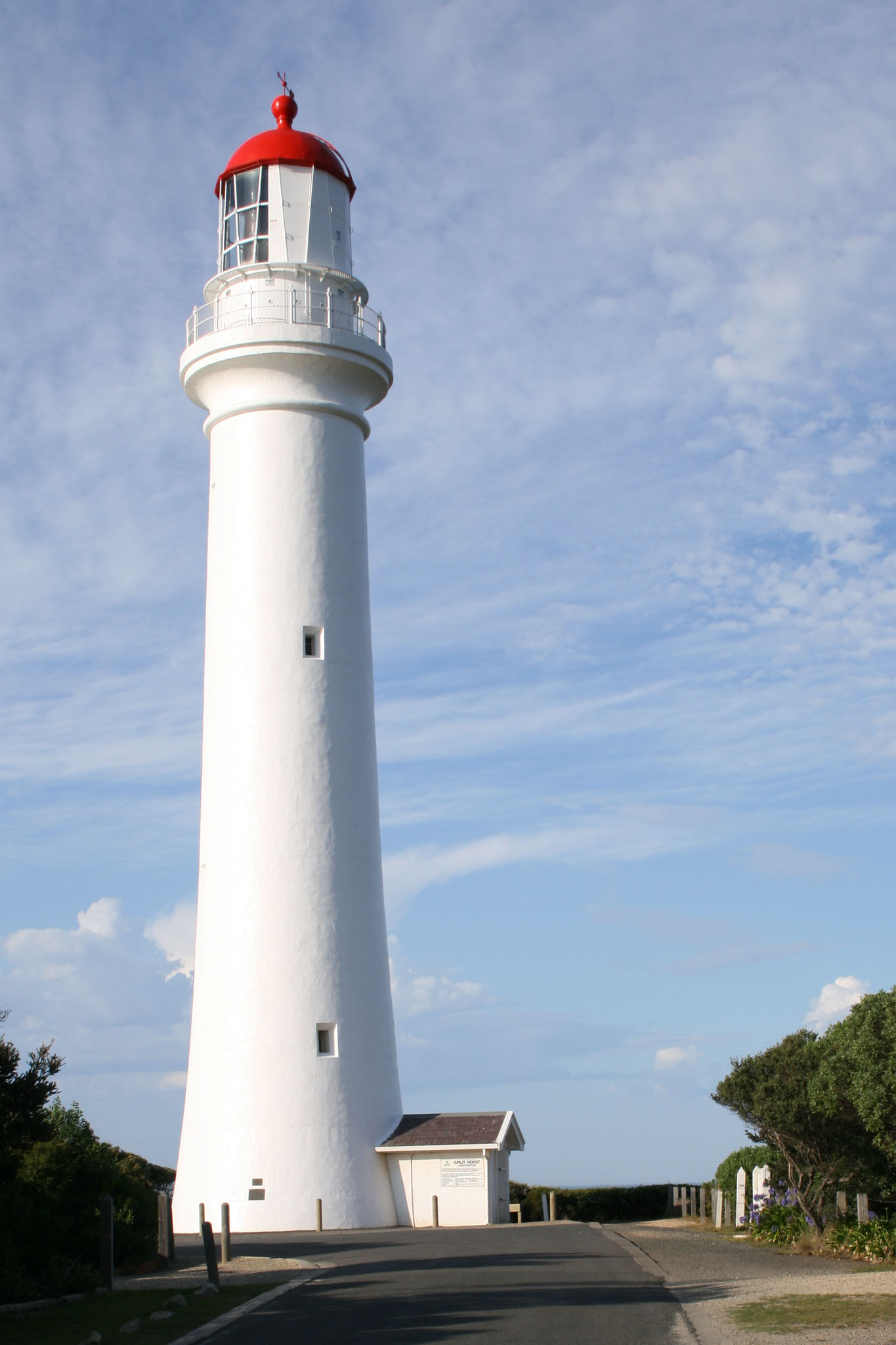
Split Point Lighthouse

While the coastline at adjacent Fairhaven is a long uninterrupted sand beach, the coast at Aireys Inlet is a series of rock shelves, interrupted by sandy swimming beaches, most of which are relatively secluded. Each beach has its own character, a result of differing lengths, orientation and nearby rock formations. Beaches include Sandy Gully, Steppy Beach and Sunnymeade.

== School ==
Aireys Inlet has one school, Aireys Inlet Primary School (P-6), which until the end of 2016 was a campus of the then Lorne-Aireys Inlet P-12 College.

== Sport ==
- Australian football: The Aireys Inlet Eels Football Club competes in the AFL Barwon junior competition.
- Tennis: The Aireys Inlet and District Tennis Club competes in the Geelong Tennis Association.

== Literature and media ==
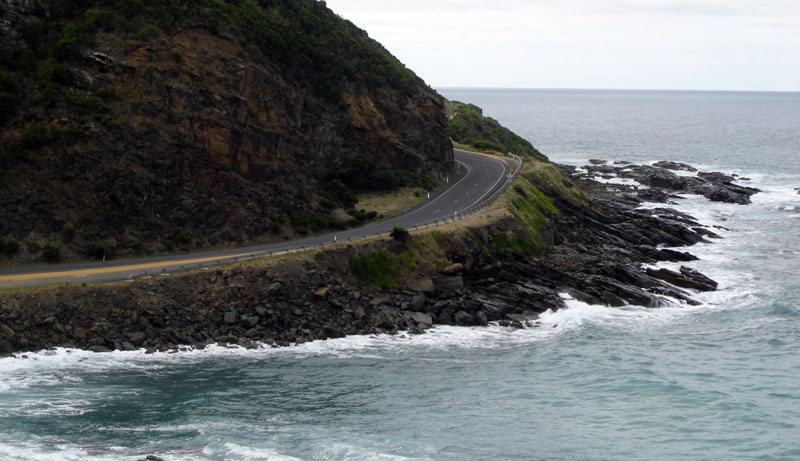
Great Ocean Road

During the early 1950s the Australian crime author Arthur Upfield lived at Aireys Inlet. His novel The New Shoe (1951) is based on the township and the lighthouse. Some of the novel's characters drew on local identities.

Many scenes from the children's television series Round the Twist were filmed at or around the area of the Split Point Lighthouse.

In 2005 the Bollywood movie Salaam Namaste was produced in Melbourne with many scenes being shot around Aireys Inlet, Fairhaven and Anglesea.

At low tide it is possible to walk (or scramble) around all these rocks and beaches, making it possible to walk along the beach, all the way from Eastern View - the historical start of the Great Ocean Road, all the way to Anglesea.

Much like Anglesea, Aireys Inlet is served by Surf Coast Times, a local newspaper for the Surf Coast published weekly on Fridays. Television services are received via a translator in Anglesea, carrying the Melbourne channels, although TV coverage from the translator is very low. Radio services are received on AM and FM from Melbourne and Geelong.

== 1983 Ash Wednesday bushfires ==
Aireys Inlet was devastated by the infamous 1983 Ash Wednesday bushfires in which a large number of houses were burnt down. However, after a brief lull, interest in the area resumed and has been steadily climbing since. Properties, especially those with an ocean view, are becoming increasingly sought after, some going for greater than A$1 million.

== Heritage listed sites ==
Aireys Inlet has a number of heritage listed sites, including:

- Great Ocean Road
- Split Point Lightstation Complex

== Notable people ==
- John Airey, the town's founder, for whom it was named
- William Buckley, British convict who lived in the area before the town's origin

== See also ==
- Urquharts Bluff
