= Anglesea, Victoria =

Anglesea
- Town
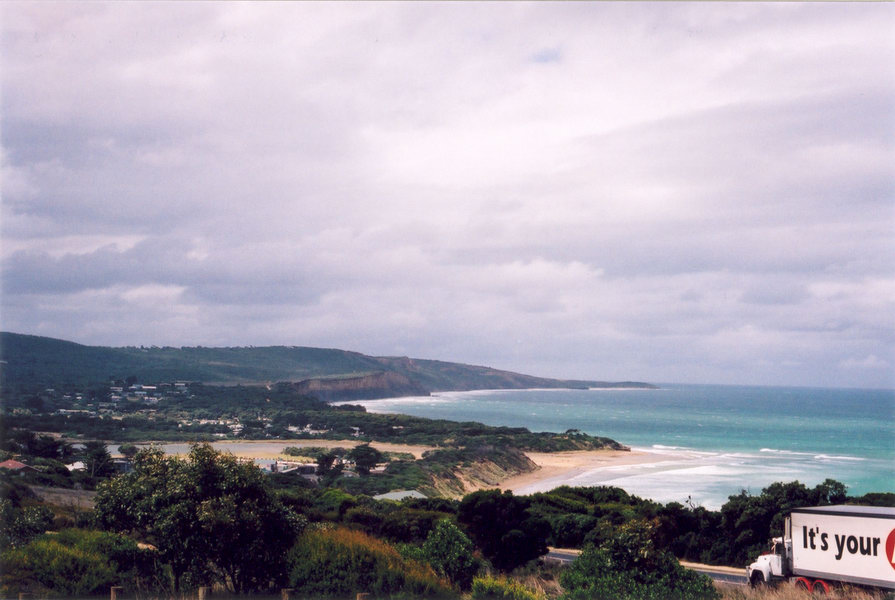
- Anglesea, including the tidal river mouth, seen from the Loveridge Lookout above the Great Ocean Road, 2004. In the middle ground is the main beach, home to the Anglesea Surf Life Saving Club, with Point Addis in the far distance.

- Coordinates: 38°24′23″S 144°11′13″E
- Country: Australia
- State: Victoria
- LGA: Surf Coast Shire
- Location: 110 km (68 mi) from Melbourne; 37 km (23 mi) from Geelong; 18 km (11 mi) from Torquay

Government
  - State electorate: Polwarth
  - Federal division: Wannon
- Elevation: 12 m (39 ft)

Population
  - Total: 3,208 (2021 census)
- Postcode: 3230
Localities around Anglesea
Gherang	Paraparap	Bellbrae
Wensleydale	Anglesea	Bells Beach
Aireys Inlet	Bass Strait	Bass Strait

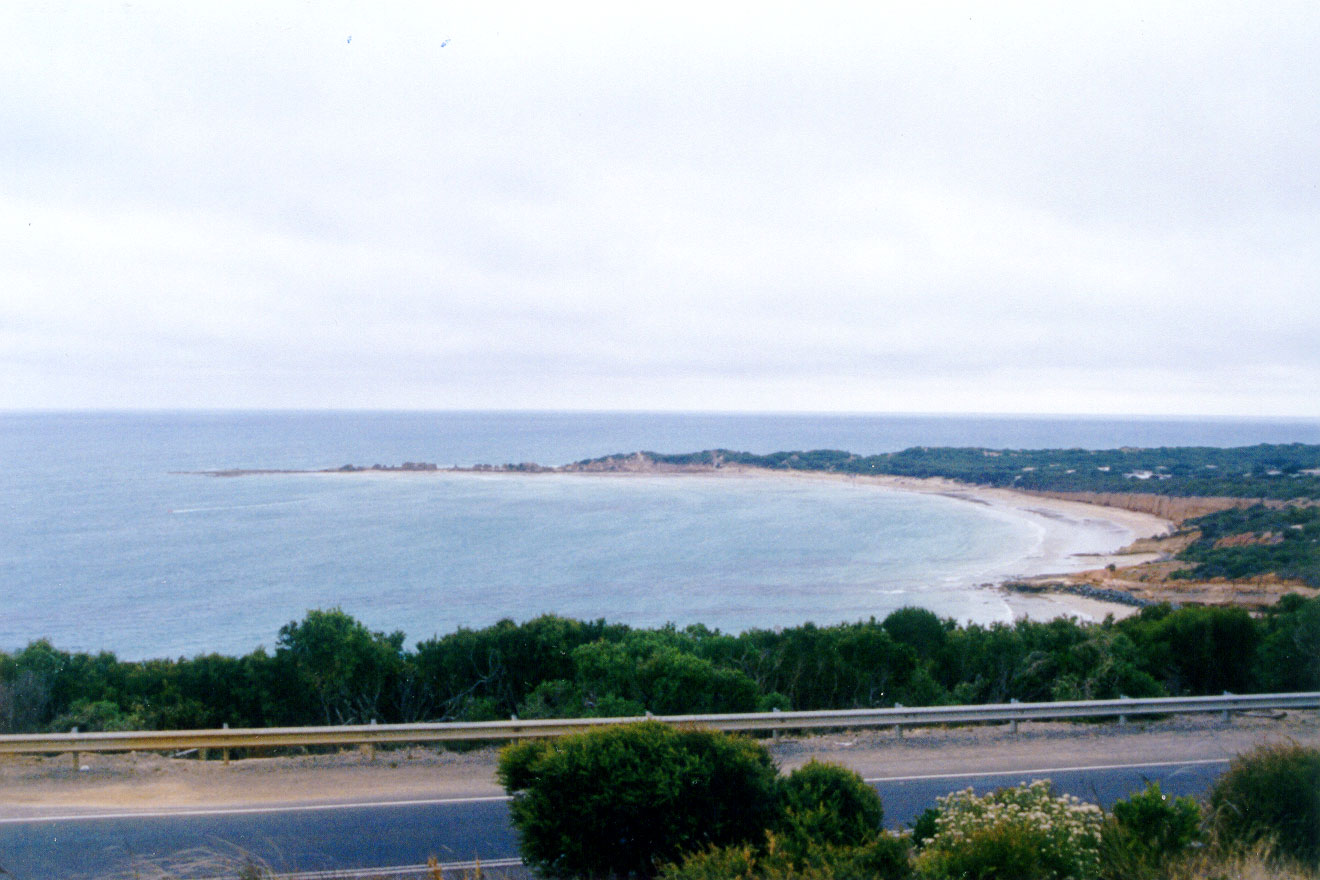
View of Point Roadknight and the Point Roadknight Beach, south-west of the town centre, seen from Loveridge Lookout above the Great Ocean Road, 2006

Anglesea is a town in Victoria, Australia. It is located on the Great Ocean Road in the Surf Coast Shire local government area. In the 2021 census, Anglesea had a population of 3,208 people.

== History ==
The soils surrounding Anglesea were particularly infertile for prospective pastoralists, being of little attraction. Naval lieutenant John Moore Cole Airey took up a grazing licence in 1839 in the vicinity of Point Roadknight, but was more of a speculator than squatter.

The first land sale occurred in 1868, with James Noble purchasing land west of Swampy Creek, the then name of the Anglesea River and the present town. His house was destroyed in a bushfire in January 1875, but rebuilt it in 1878 to coincide with a holiday with his friends.

With the growth of fishing in the area, further land sales ensued, with blocks of land put up for sale where the present shopping strip lies. Portions of Noble's land were also subdivided.

The area's name was changed to Anglesea River in 1884 when the township was established. A Post Office under that name opened on 16 April 1886. and was renamed Anglesea in 1950. The name derives from Anglesey, an island in North Wales.

By 1890 guesthouses had begun to appear in the town, and the Anglesea Hotel, coach services to Geelong and several churches had been constructed. In 1892 a bridge was constructed across the river.

With the construction of the Great Ocean Road in 1922, permanent residents began to settle in the town, and the number of visitors, already initially popular, began to dramatically increase.

Alcoa of Australia operated a power station and open-cut coal mine near the town from 1969 until August 2015. The site is now the subject of restoration work.

In February 1983, the Ash Wednesday fires swept through the area, destroying many houses.

== Tourism ==
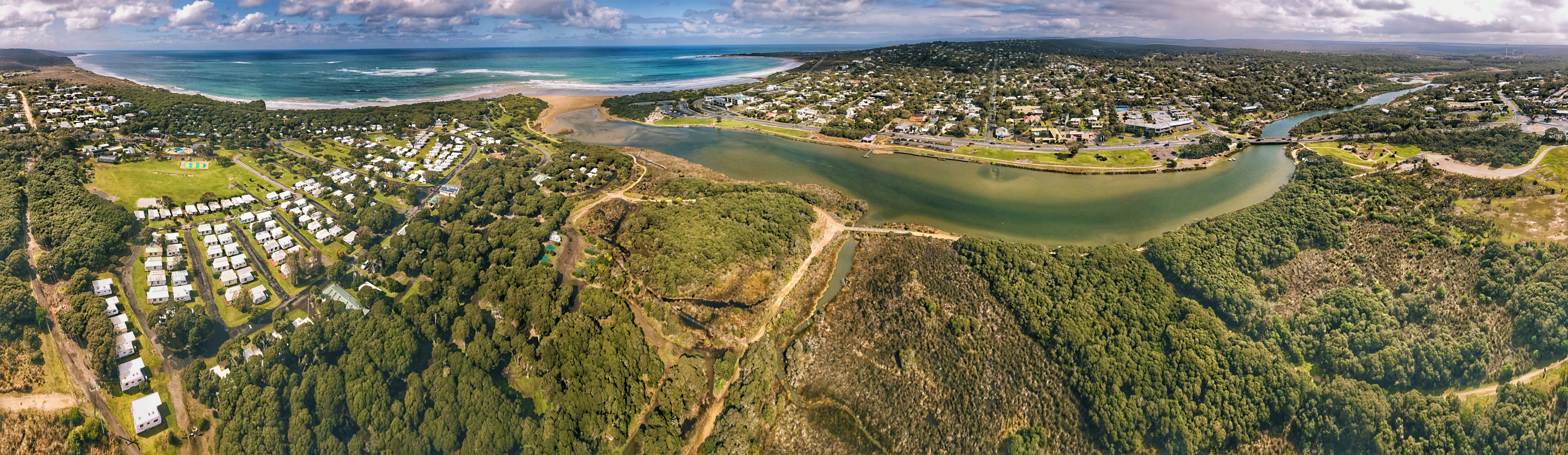
Aerial panorama of the coastal township of Anglesea, Victoria and the Anglesea River, September 2018.

There is a surge in population during the summer months, reaching a peak around Christmas and New Year's Eve, as many Melbourne residents arrive for the holiday season. Although the town's main beach usually has reasonable surfing conditions, many surfers opt for the beach known as "Guvvo's", just west of town, at the end of O'Donohue Road. Anglesea is also well known locally for its regular riverbank markets, which are held by the river on Anglesea's main street, the Great Ocean Road.

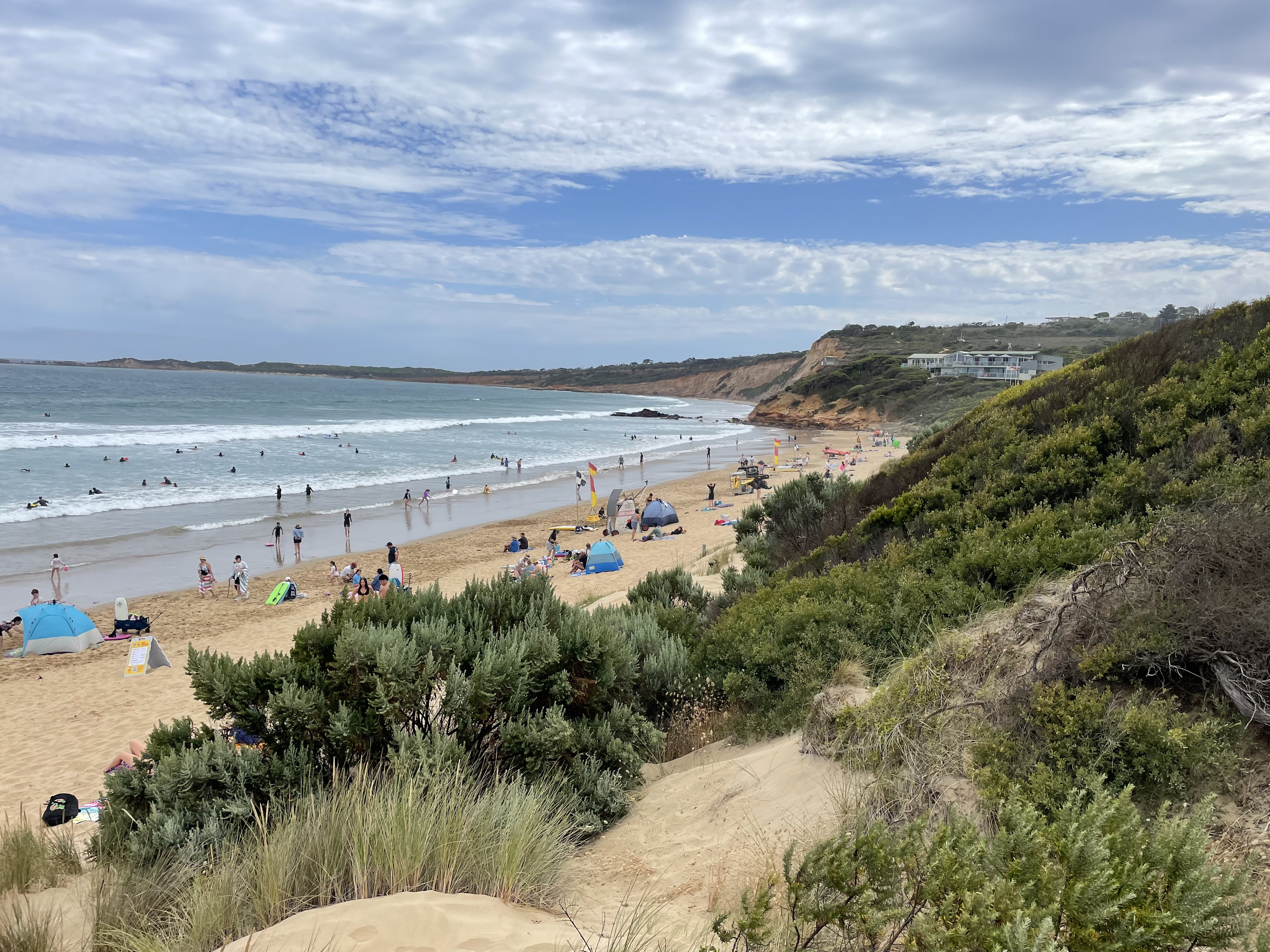
Anglesea beach, January 2026, with Point Roadknight in distance and Anglesea Surf Life Saving Club on cliff

The town's golf-course is renowned for its resident population of eastern grey kangaroos which graze on the fairways. In September the town hosts the Angair Wildflower Festival.

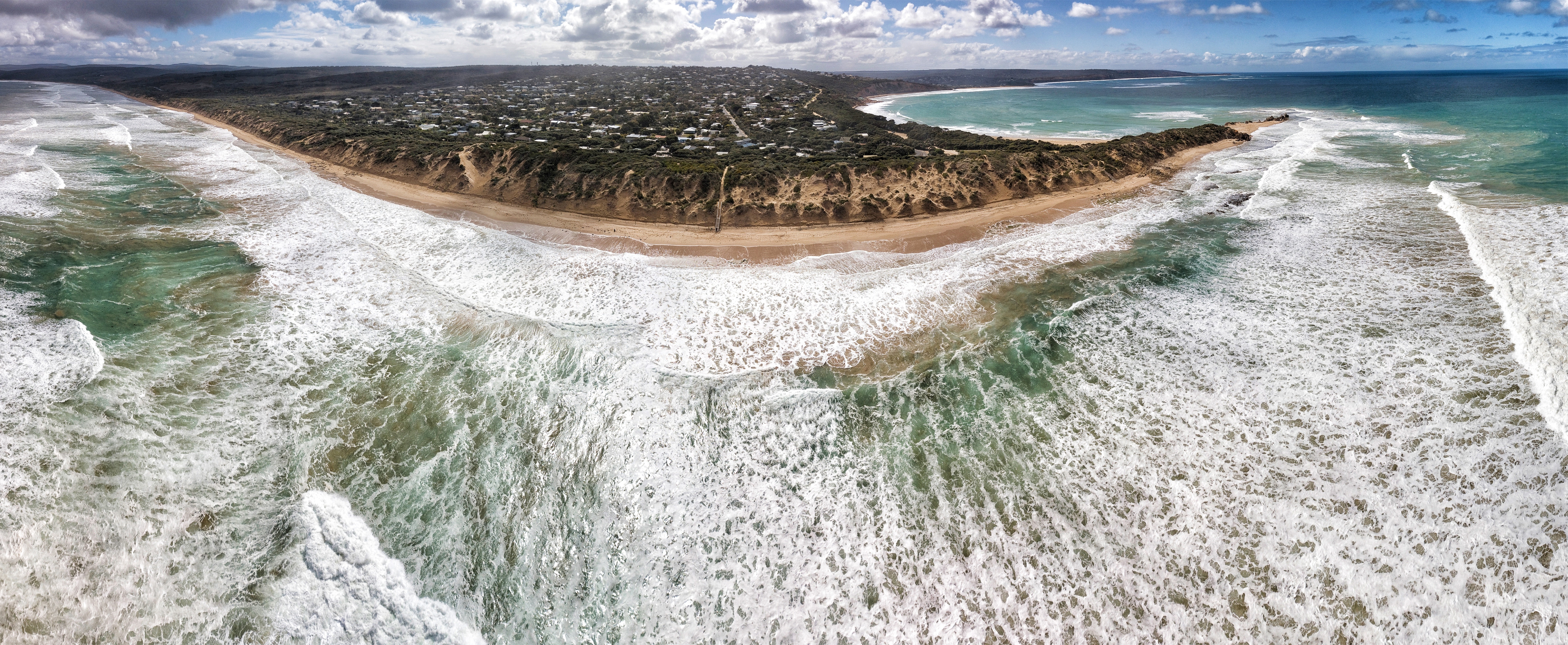
Point Roadknight Back Beach Aerial Panorama, September 2018

The Surf Coast Walk passes through the town and can either be followed north-east along the coastline to Torquay or south-east towards Aireys Inlet and Moggs Creek.

Point Roadknight, Point Addis and Harvey Street are some of the tourist attractions along with several parks which surround the coastline. The Coogoorah Park is located towards the end of the River Reserve Road which boasts of a network of islands connected by boardwalks and bridges through wetlands.

== Media ==
Anglesea is served by the Surf Coast Times newspaper, published weekly on Fridays. Television services are received from Melbourne via a translator on Mount Ingoldsby. AM and FM radio services are received from Melbourne and Geelong.

== Sport ==
Anglesea has an Australian Rules football club and combined netball club, which compete in the Bellarine Football League.

The town is also home of the Anglesea Cricket Club which competes in the Bellarine Peninsula Cricket Association.

Golfers play at the Anglesea Golf Club on Noble Street, which plays host to numerous eastern grey kangaroos, which are a tourist attraction in their own right.

The Anglesea skateboard ramp, which has had a controversial existence, has a recently been re-built, with the construction material having evolved from wood to steel, and then concrete.

The area has a variety of surfing locations that cater to both beginners and experienced surfers. The main beach and the sheltered beach at Point Roadknight provide a suitable surfing environment for beginners. Meanwhile, more skilled surfers can experience the more exposed beaches to the north and south of the town, as well as several offshore reefs, which are accessible via personal watercraft or a lengthy paddle from shore. It is also worth noting that there can often be large sea waves in this area.

== See also ==
- Anglesea Recreation & Sports Club
- Urquharts Bluff
- Geshe Sonam Thargye - Buddhist centre
