= Thirteenth Beach =

Beach in Victoria, Australia

Coordinates: 38.2829°S 144.4441°E

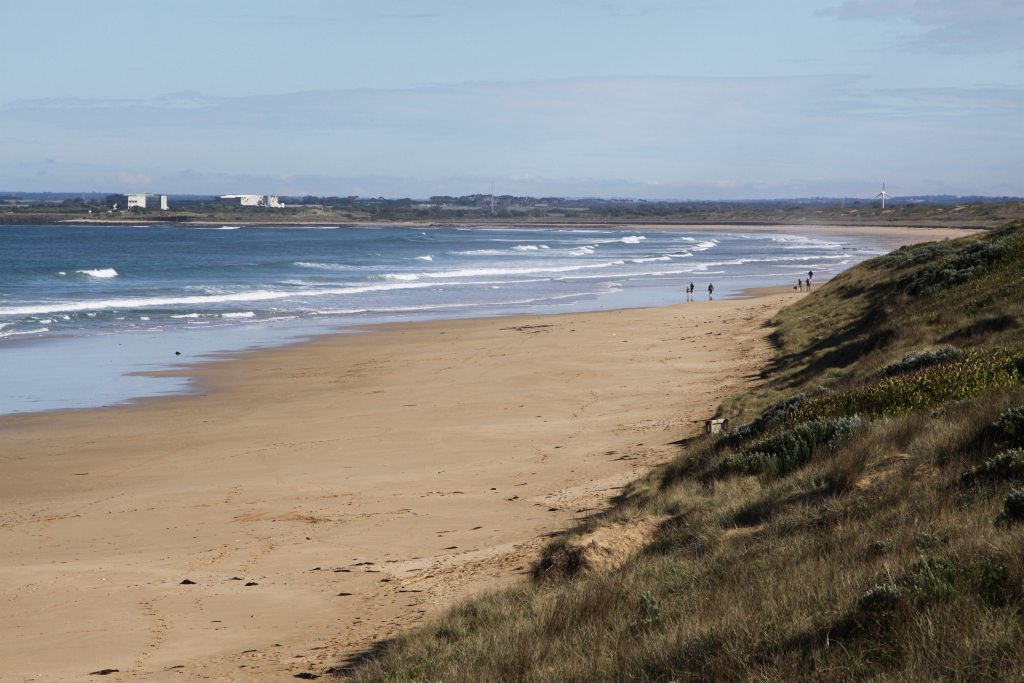
Western end of the beach looking towards Black Rock and Breamlea, Victoria

Thirteenth Beach is located west of Barwon Heads, Victoria, Australia and the name is taken from the close proximity of the beach to the thirteenth hole of the Barwon Heads Golf Course. Stretching along 4.5 kilometres of coast, Black Rock marks the western end.

13th Beach or commonly known as "13th" is extremely popular with surfers of all ability due to its diverse waves and breaks that stretch along the beach. Professional surfers frequent the beach.

The beach is home to the Thirteenth Beach Barwon Heads Surf Lifesaving Club, which voluntarily patrols the beach on weekends in the summer months to rescue people who get into difficulties in the dangerous surf conditions. Paid Lifeguards also patrol the beach during the week in summer.
