= List of places of worship in Surf Coast Shire =

This is a list of places of worship in Surf Coast Shire, a local government area in the state of Victoria, Australia. The list includes active and former churches and other religious buildings representing a variety of Christian denominations and other faiths.

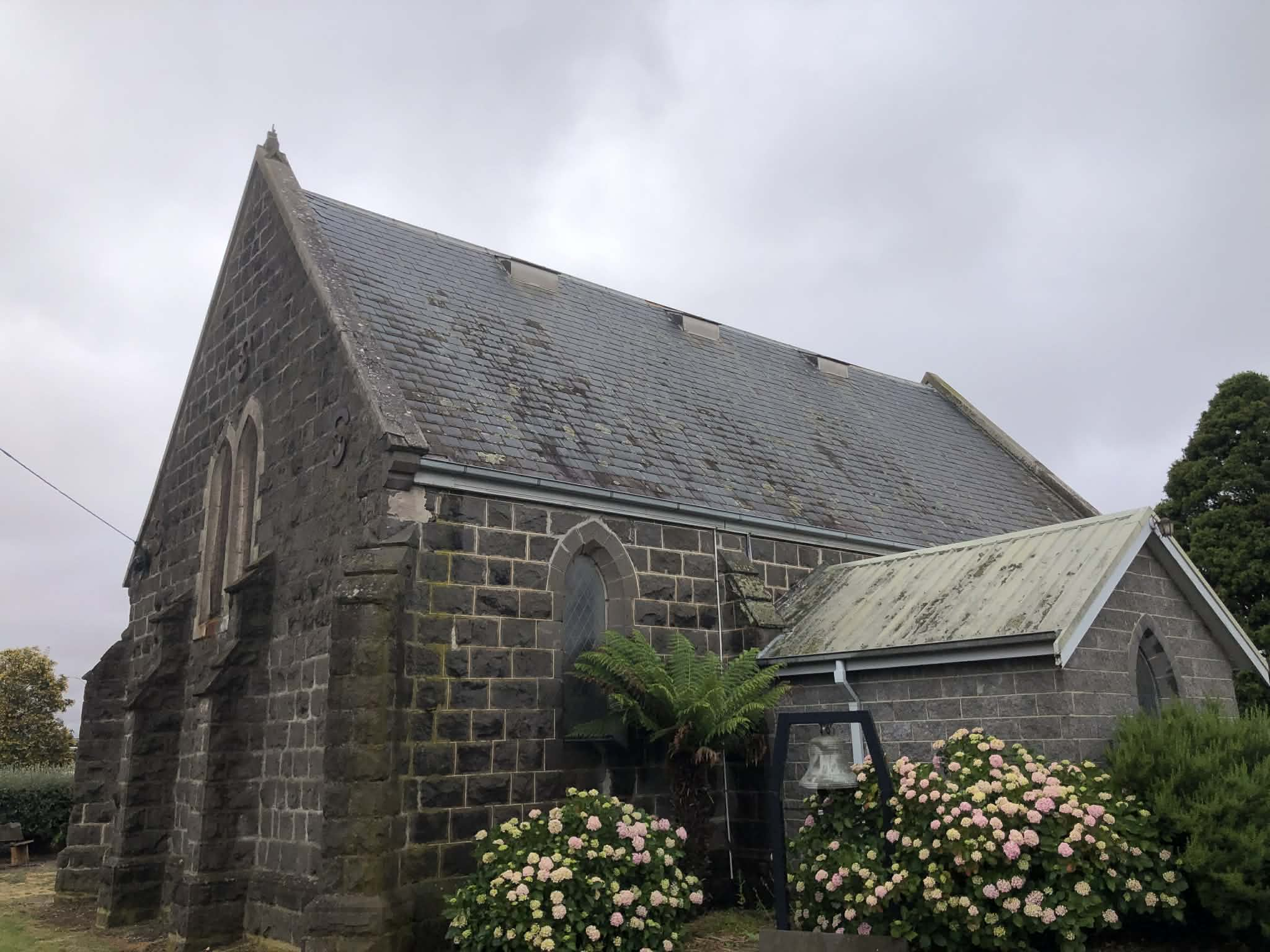
St Thomas' Anglican Church, Winchelsea

== Heritage listing status ==
| Style | Status |
|---|---|
| Yes | Listed on the Victorian Heritage Register |
| – | Not listed |

== Current places of worship ==
Current places of worship
| Name | Image | Location | Denomination/ Affiliation | Heritage listing | Notes | Refs |
|---|---|---|---|---|---|---|
| St Luke's Anglican Church | | Torquay; 38.335594°S 144.322824°E | Anglican | – | | |
| St Therese Catholic Church | | Torquay; 38.331051°S 144.316072°E | Catholic | – | | |
| Torquay Uniting Church | | Torquay; 38.333813°S 144.320788°E | Uniting (formerly Presbyterian) | – | | |
| Anglican Church of the Transfiguration | | Anglesea; 38.404426°S 144.188706°E | Anglican | – | | |
| St Cristopher's Catholic Church | | Anglesea; 38.399859°S 144.187843°E | Catholic | – | | |
| Trinity Uniting Church | | Anglesea; 38.405363°S 144.186827°E | Uniting (formerly Presbyterian) | – | | |
| All Saints' Anglican Church | | Lorne; 38.543721°S 143.976719°E | Anglican | Yes | | |
| Our Lady of Fatima Catholic Church | | Lorne; 38.539988°S 143.974317°E | Catholic | – | | |
| St Cuthbert's Uniting Church | | Lorne; 38.539687°S 143.974820°E | Uniting (formerly Presbyterian) | Yes | | |
| St Aidan's Anglican Church | | Aireys Inlet; 38.458134°S 144.106373°E | Anglican | – | | |
| St Thomas' Anglican Church | | Winchelsea; 38.241533°S 143.992120°E | Anglican | Yes | | |
| St John the Baptist Catholic Church | | Winchelsea; 38.237846°S 143.989437°E | Catholic | Yes | | |
| Winchelsea Uniting Church | | Winchelsea; 38.242347°S 143.988856°E | Uniting (formerly Presbyterian) | Yes | | |
| Bellbrae Uniting Church | | Bellbrae; 38.330046°S 144.263461°E | Uniting (formerly Methodist) | – | | |
| Barrabool Uniting Church | | Barrabool; 38.169959°S 144.210200°E | Uniting (formerly Presbyterian) | – | | |
| St Wilfrid's Anglican Church | | Mount Duneed; 38.249329°S 144.332713°E | Anglican | – | | |
| Drol Kar Buddhist Centre | | Paraparap; 38.313547°S 144.173288°E | Buddhist | – | | |
| St David's Lutheran Church | | Freshwater Creek; 38.276922°S 144.270680°E | Lutheran | Yes | | |

== Former places of worship ==
Former places of worship
| Name | Image | Location | Denomination/ Affiliation | Heritage listing | Notes | Refs |
|---|---|---|---|---|---|---|
| Moriac Uniting Church | | Moriac; 38.241923°S 144.175547°E | Uniting (formerly Methodist) | – | | |
| St Saviour's Anglican Church | | Modewarre; 38.259337°S 144.144280°E | Anglican | – | | |
| Siloam Bible Christian Chapel | | Modewarre; 38.250921°S 144.135288°E | Bible Christian (Methodist) | – | | |
| St Patrick's Catholic Church | | Mount Moriac; 38.213303°S 144.171026°E | Catholic | Yes | | |
| St Paul's Anglican Church | | Deans Marsh; 38.400093°S 143.885628°E | Anglican | – | | |
| Deans Marsh Presbyterian Church | | Deans Marsh; 38.398674°S 143.885290°E | Presbyterian | – | | |
| Holy Trinity Anglican Church | | Ceres; 38.164502°S 144.249518°E | Anglican | Yes | | |
| St Mary's Catholic Church | | Gnarwarre; 38.166898°S 144.143209°E | Catholic | Non-existent | | |
| Bambra Chapel | | Bambra; 38.365245°S 143.945432°E | Bible Christian (Methodist) | – | | |
