= Barrabool Uniting Church =

Uniting church in Barrabool, Victoria, Australia

- Hills Uniting Church
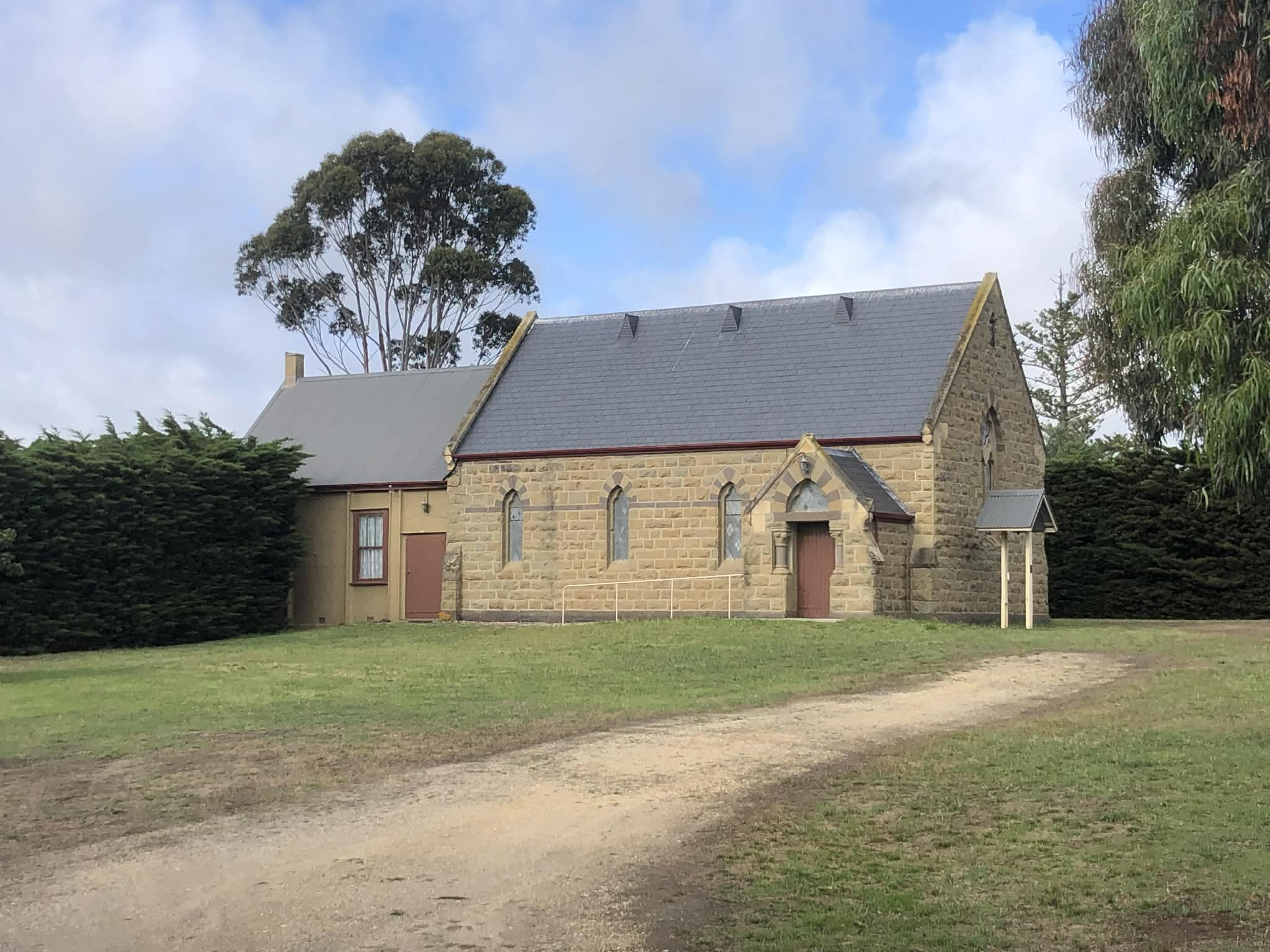
- Barrabool Uniting Church, Barrabool, Victoria, Australia
- Barrabool Uniting Church
- 38.16994°S 144.21021°E
- Address: 1135 Barrabool Road, Barrabool, Victoria
- Country: Australia
- Denomination: Uniting (since 1977)
- Website: https://victas.uca.org.au/church/barrabool-hills/

History
- Former name: Barrabool Presbyterian Church
- Founded: 1871

Architecture
- Architect(s): Davidson and Henderson
- Architectural type: Church
- Style: Victorian Gothic
- Years built: 1870

Administration
- Parish: Barrabool

Barrabool Uniting Church (formerly Barrabool Presbyterian Church) is a heritage-listed church and manse located at 1135 Barrabool Road, Barrabool, in the Surf Coast Shire, Victoria, Australia. The building complex is significant for its architectural design, social history, and as an early work by the Geelong architectural firm Davidson & Henderson.

== History ==
European settlement in the Barrabool Hills began in the late 1830s, and by 1840 the Barrabool Parish had been surveyed and sold. In 1855, Charles McLachlan, a prominent landowner in Barrabool, donated approximately two acres of his land for the establishment of a Presbyterian church, manse, school, and teacher's residence. This early donation laid the foundation for a local Presbyterian congregation and formal worship in the district.

By 1857–1858, a denominational school and a teacher's residence were constructed on the donated land. The school building measured about 20 by 18 feet, and the residence comprised three rooms. The school opened in May 1858.

Recognising the need for a minister's home, the local Presbyterian community built a manse in 1859–1860. The manse was designed by architect Andrew McWilliams and constructed in Barrabool stone, giving it a sense of permanence and solidity. The use of locally quarried rubble stone, tooled quoinwork, and Italianate design elements reflected both local materials and the architectural tastes of the time.

As the congregation grew, plans were made for a permanent church building. In 1870-1 the current church structure was erected. The Geelong-based architectural firm Davidson & Henderson designed the building in a Victorian Gothic Revival style, and construction employed high-quality local Barrabool sandstone, as well as dressed limestone from nearby quarries.

The stonework features detailed foliated capitals, inset buttresses, and a sculpted porch attributed to monumental mason Samuel Brain, indicating a high level of craftsmanship.

A planting program was also instituted at the time of construction: mature trees of Monterey cypress, radiata pine, Norfolk Island pine, Norfolk Island hibiscus, golden ash, and other species were planted on the site.

The Barrabool Presbyterian Church remained active through the 19th and 20th centuries. In 1977, with the union of the Presbyterian, Methodist, and Congregational churches, the congregation became part of the Uniting Church in Australia. Despite denominational changes, the church continues to serve the local rural community.

The church currently conducts a worship service each Sunday at 10:00am.

== See also ==
- Pollocksford Bridge
- Barrabool
- Barrabool Hills
- Ceres, Victoria
