= Barrabool Hills =

Small region in Victoria, Australia

- View of Mount Moriac and the Barrabool Hills from Ceres

Highest point
- Peak: Mount Moriac
- Elevation: 254 m (833 ft)
- Coordinates: 38.1629°S 144.2676°E

Dimensions
- Length: 23 km (14 mi) East-West

Geography
- Location within Victoria
- Country: Australia
- States/Districts: Victoria

Geology
- Rock age: Cretaceous

The Barrabool Hills are a small region in south-Western Victoria, on the western outskirts of Geelong. The National Trust of Australia describes the hills as being a "distinctive upland ridge located to the west of Geelong, on the south side of the Barwon River", that "slope steeply on the northern side down to the Barwon River, and more gently southward to the coastal lowland." The area stretches roughly through the modern localities of Gnarwarre, Barrabool and Ceres, and straddles the intersection of the City of Greater Geelong, Surf Coast Shire and Golden Plains Shire.

== History ==
The area was first settled by pastoralists in the late 1830s. Wynd (1992) suggests that there was less conflict with the Wautharong traditional owners in the Barrabool Hills than further inland, but that incidents where settlers' animals were killed in the area sparked the 187 decision to send Foster Fyans as police sergeant to Geelong in 1837, followed by a thirteen-man military detachment in 1838. An Aboriginal reserve was proposed for the Barrabool Parish in 1840, but the suggestion was ignored and the land sold. The last member of the Barrabool tribe of the Wautharong died in 1885; Wynd attributes intertribal warfare, retaliation murders, disease, liquor, and the loss of their lands as causes of their demise

The first road through the Barrabool Hills was surveyed by Alexander Skene in 1839, running from Highton through the "Roslin", "Merrawarp" and "Strathlachlan" estates to Winchelsea (then known as Austin's Ford). The first sale of lands in the Barrabool Hills took place on 5 February 1840, when the lands of the Barrabool Parish, divided up into 25 blocks of varying sizes, were sold. Wynd writes that there was "plenty of competition for the rich lands of the Barrabool Hills". A sale of the Gnarwarre Parish in the west of the hills on 10 June 1840 was much less successful, with only four blocks being sold; the vast majority of that parish later sold during the 1850s. Transport continued to be a significant challenge through this period, as the road between the hills and Geelong was of very low quality and was claimed to be "impassible" in winter. The first community building in the region was an Anglican school at Barrabool in 1847, and Ceres became the first settlement in the hills when it was first built in 1850. Throughout the 1850s, the village of Ceres prospered, and a smaller village at Gnarwarre (also known as Shankhill) developed; a number of churches and denominational schools were also built at Barrabool in this era, but a clear centre there never developed. The Barrarbool Road District (note the spelling), the forerunner of the Shire of Barrabool, was created in 1853, and marked both an attempt to resolve the area's transport problems and its first local government. The road board was later renamed "Barrabool Hills" by the 1850s.

The Barrabool Hills became established as a farming area with the development of smaller farms in the late 1840s and 1850s, with a "reputation for fertility". The 1850s, in addition to the local settlements, saw the development of local farms, including the Berramongo Estate and Suisse Vineyard at Barrabool, both of which still exist today. However, the farmers of the Barrabool Hills also faced a number of difficulties throughout this period. The Barrabool Hills were badly burned in bushfires on 6 February 1851, which killed more than sixteen people. Transporting wheat, the main crop of the hills in this era, to Geelong for milling proved a challenge, and a water mill was built on the Barwon River near Buckley Falls in 1851 to address this. The development of roads continued to be a problem through the 1850s, with much local agitation for the development of key roads between the centres of the Barrabool Hills and the main roads, and for a bridge across the Barwon River, which first happened between Gnarwarre and Murgheboluc at Pollocksford in 1859, and then at Ceres in the 1860s.

== Vinegrowing ==
Vinegrowing in the Barrabool Hills had been ongoing since 1842, when the Neuchatel vineyard was established. The vineyard was successful, and Wynd suggests that by 1846 the only comparable vineyard in the Port Phillip colony was that of John Pascoe Fawkner in Melbourne. The Berramongo property also planted a vineyard around 1842 or 1843. The "Suisse" vineyard was established at the corner of Merrawarp Road and Barrabool Road in 1859. The "Victoria" was established near the Waurn Ponds Creek, the "Chillon", near the Neuchatel vineyard, and "Ceres" between Ceres and Highton, were among many to be established. By 1863, Barrabool wine was selling well, and the Geelong Advertiser speculated that the area would become the "Victorian Halle aux Vins". At one stage, the Ceres-Barrabool area had 29 vineyards. However, the industry declined in the 1870s, and a phylloxera vasiatrix outbreak, first detected in 1877, marked the end of the industry for many years. Attempts to manage it failed, and by the end of 1882 the entire Geelong region was finished as a winegrowing region. There were small attempts to revitalise the industry in the 1880s and 1890s, but the industry did not return to the Barrabool Hills area until the 1970s.

== Self-governance and decline ==
The Barrabool Hills area gained full local government with the development of the Shire of Barrabool in 1865. Two other short-lived organisations briefly existed in this era to address grievances held by local farmers: a Barrabool Hills Protection Association had been formed in May 1858 to grievances held by local farmers, and a Barrabool Hills Protection Association had been formed in May 1858 to support protectionist policies, and the Barrabool Farmers' Association formed in 1870 to address a range of issues with the authorities. The number of people occupying land across the Shire of Barrabool declined substantially from the 1860s to the 1890s, as many settlers left the district and farm sizes once again became larger. The wheat industry in the Barrabool Hills declined markedly, with farmers trying livestock and a variety of other crops as alternatives; it remained known as a farming district, and much of the district converted to selling hay. While progress was made with a number of key road connections in around the Barrabool Hills through the 1870s and 1880s, the hills began to diminish in importance compared to lands further south. The development of railways through the area saw lines to the south and north of the Barrabool Hills, but no line in the hills region. By the early 20th century, the Gnarwarre (or Shankill) village had largely shut down, the assortment of facilities at Barrabool was in decline, and the village of Ceres, while surviving, shrank considerably.

== Today ==
Gnarwarre and Barrabool remain sparsely populated rural localities today; Ceres has seen a small increase in recent years due to its proximity to Geelong and scenic views.

A number of commercial and social developments in Highton, on the edge of the Barrabool Hills, have adopted the Barrabool Hills name in the 21st century. These include the Barrabool Hills Baptist Church, in Province Boulevard, and the Barrabool Hills Shopping Centre, currently being developed on the corner of Stoneleigh Crescent and Province Boulevard, Highton.
