= Pollocksford Bridge =

Road bridge in Victoria, Australia

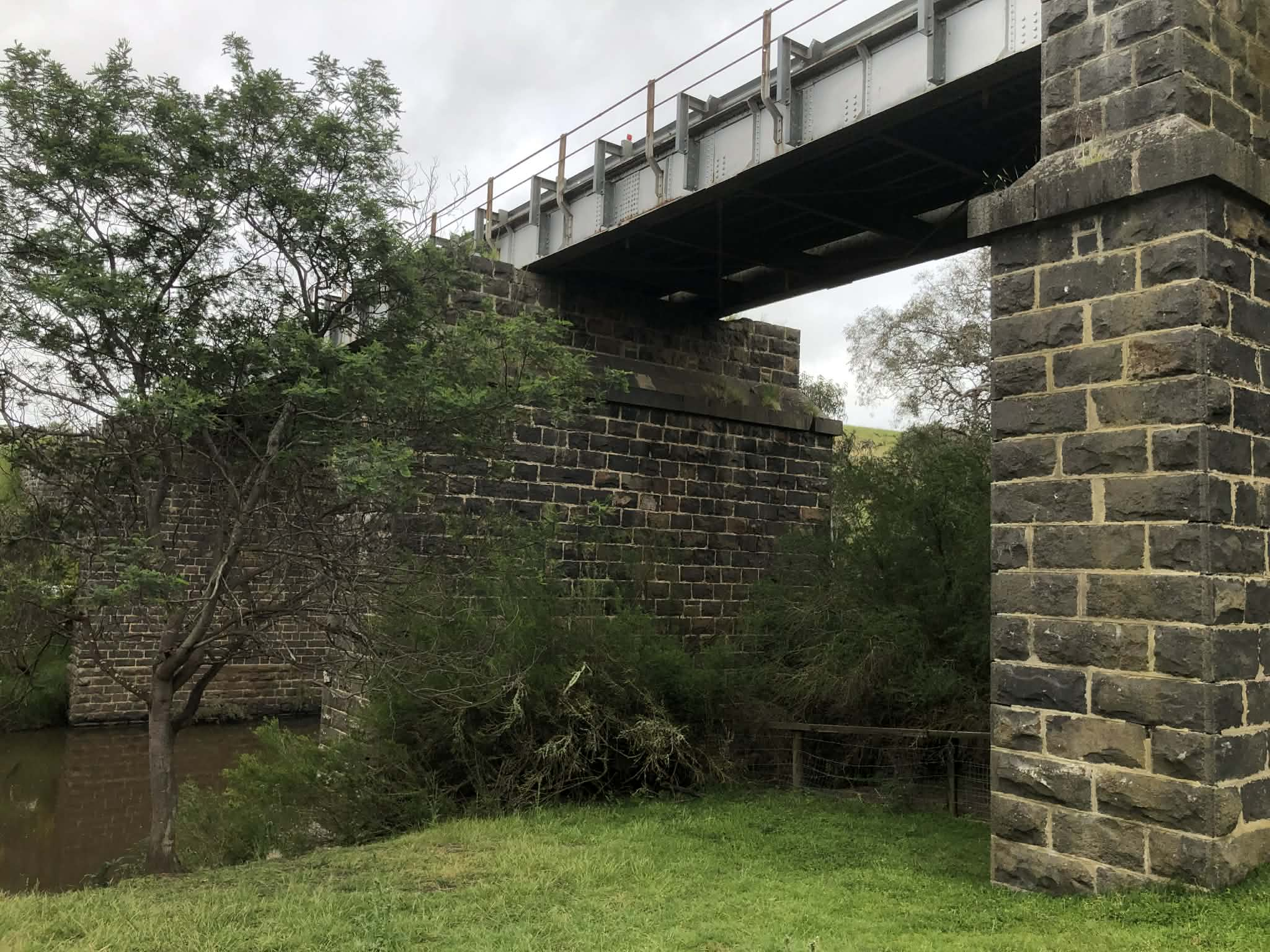
- Pollocksford Bridge, November 2025
- Coordinates: 38°8′42.2724″S 144°11′13.135″E
- Carries: Pollocksford Road
- Crosses: Barwon River
- Locale: Gnarwarre and Stonehaven
- Maintained by: Department of Transport and Planning

Characteristics
- Design: Steel girder bridge
- Total length: 260 ft (79.2 m)
- Width: 32 m (105.0 ft)
- Longest span: 90 ft (27.4 m)
- Design life: Steel girders replaced wood (1920-present); Wooden bridge with bluestone piers (1858-1920)

History
- Opened: 1858

Location
- Interactive map of Pollocksford Bridge

Pollocksford Bridge is a heritage-listed road bridge spanning the Barwon River in Victoria, Australia, located between the localities of Gnarwarre and Stonehaven, and between the Surf Coast Shire and Golden Plains Shire. The bridge is notable for its early bluestone construction, its continued use into the 20th and 21st centuries, and its significance to local transport history.

== History ==
The original Pollocksford Bridge was constructed in 1858. The initial structure featured bluestone piers supporting a timber superstructure, characteristic of early Victorian bridge engineering. Serving rural and agricultural communities west of Geelong, it provided one of the earliest substantial crossings of the Barwon River in the region.

In the early 20th century, the bridge underwent major reconstruction. The timber deck was replaced with a steel superstructure while retaining the original bluestone piers, reflecting both the technological advancements of the era and the desire to preserve historical fabric. The reconstructured bridge was officially reopened on 14 February 1921 in a ceremony attended by Victorian Premier Sir Harry Lawson, local councilors, and residents, highlighting its importance to the community.

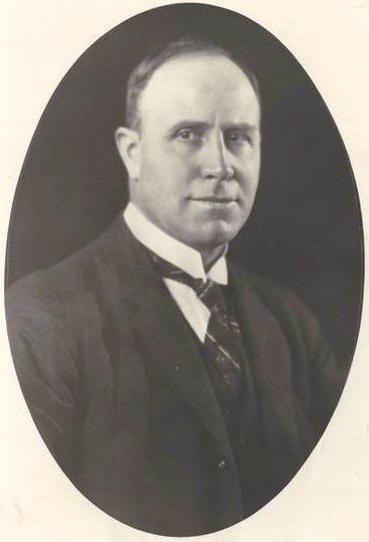
Sir Harry Lawson, Premier of Victoria, who reopened the bridge on 14 February 1921

Pollocksford Bridge is a single-lane vehicular crossing and remains significant for its design and materials. The bluestone piers are a key heritage attribute, demonstrating mid-19th-century masonry techniques.As a historically significant item, it has been formally recognised in the Surf Coast and Golden Plains heritage citations.

In recent years, structural assessments have led to load and speed restrictions due to deterioration of deck elements. Both Surf Coast Shire and Golden Plains Shire have undertaken planning for replacement of the deck, with design work and construction scheduled in the mid-2020s. The bridge continues to serve as a vital link for local traffic, including school bus routes.

== See also ==
- Fyansford Paper Mill
- Princes Bridge
