= Wettenhall family murders =

1993 triple homicide in Victoria

- Darcy, Guy and Janet Wettenhall
- Location: 38.1591°S 144.2641°E; Ceres, Victoria, Australia
- Date: 18 March 1992; 34 years ago
- Target: Members of the Wettenhall family
- Attack type: Murder-suicide
- Weapon: 12-gauge shotgun
- Deaths: 3
- Victims: Darcy Wettenhall, 50; Guy Wettenhall, 23; Janet Wettenhall, 81
- Perpetrator: Wayne Garry Walton

The Wettenhall family murders was the 1992 triple shooting murder of three members of the Wettenhall family, Darcy Wettenhall, 50, his son Guy Wettenhall, 23 and Janet Wettenhall, 81, at Ceres, Victoria on March 18, 1992.

The accused, Wayne Garry Walton, was a 23 year old troubled man with convictions for theft who worked as a farm hand and labourer at the Wettenhall family's stud farm, after meeting Darcy Wettenhall at the Gill Memorial Home for Men, a homeless shelter located in Melbourne.

Walton, who became involved in a sexual relationship with Darcy Wettenhall prior to the murders, was apprehended by police the following day while driving a stolen car and in possession of items taken from the Wettenhall family's farm. He was charged with three counts of murder.

Walton suicided by hanging using a television cable inside a management and supervision section of Pentridge Prison's B Division on February 22, 1993, while awaiting trial for the murders.

The murders brought an end to the Wettenhall family's stud farm operations and the Stanbury property was sold by auction in December 1992, purchased by former Royal Agricultural Society of Victoria president, Stephen Spargo, and his wife Jill.

A non-fiction book based on the murders, Devils Grip, A True Story of Shame, Sheep and Shotguns, was written by Neall Drinan with Bob Perry and published in 2019.

== Wettenhall family ==
The Wettenhall family's stud farm, Stanbury, located on Devon Road in Ceres, Victoria, was regarded as one of the top stud farms in Australia producing world class and award-winning Corriedale sheep. The farm had been in the Wettenhall family since 1951 after being purchased by Rupert Wettenhall and his wife Janet. Rupert Wettenhall died on July 25, 1962, while in Buenos Aires, Argentina during international travels to sell his sheep to overseas buyers.

At the time of the murders, Stanbury was operated by Darcy Wettenhall and his son Guy, with Janet Wettenhall continuing to reside on the property. The property contains a sandstone home constructed in the 1850s, as well as a two-storey heritage listed shearing shed.

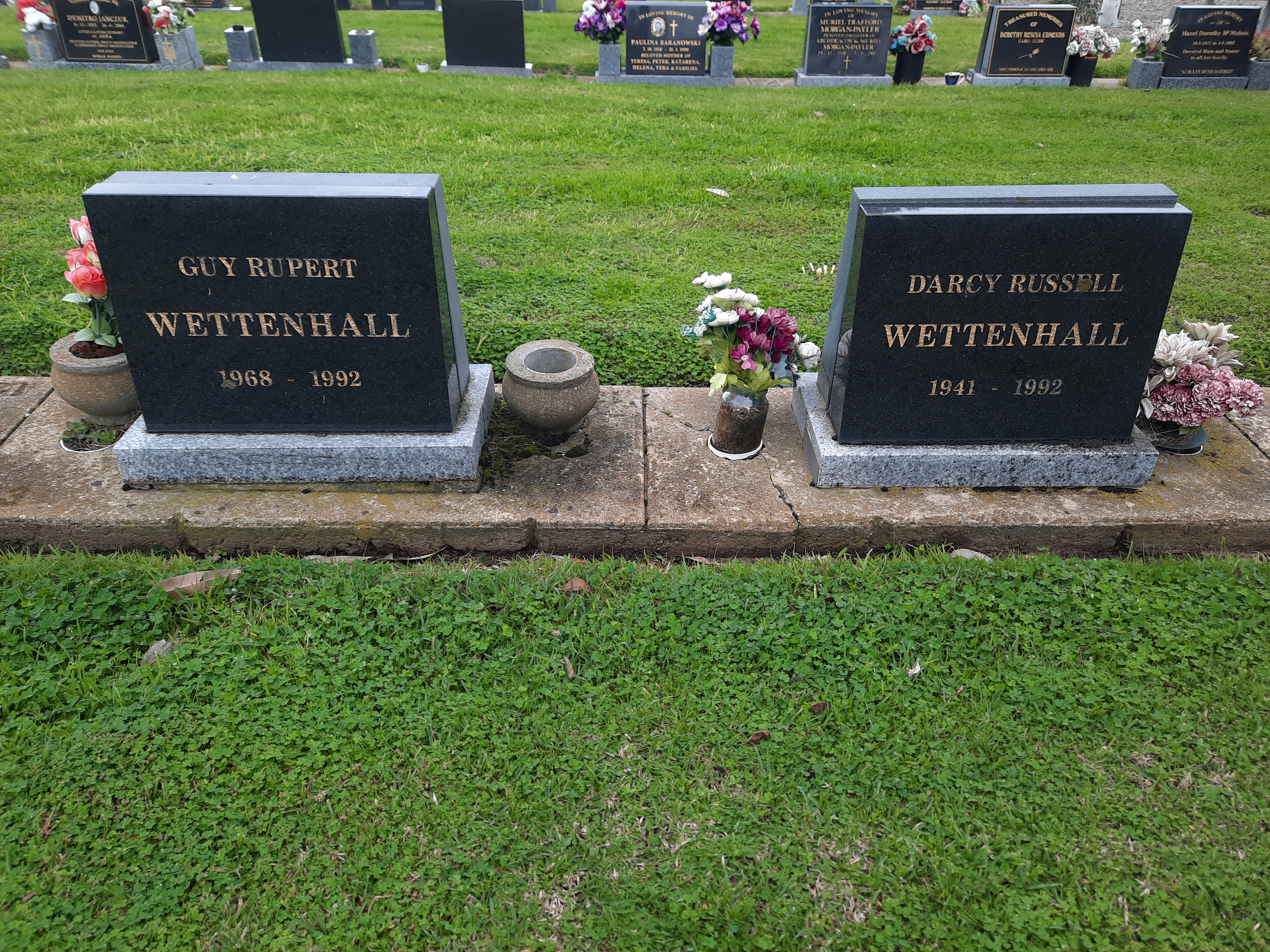
Gravesites of Darcy and Guy Wettenhall, Highton Cemetery

Darcy was a troubled youth and went to live with his cousins, Rupert and Janet Wettenhall from an early age. He had a reputation for being both generous and cruel, and often bad tempered.

Darcy Wettenhall and his wife, Jan McDonald separated shortly after the birth of their only child, Guy, born in 1968. Custody of Guy was granted to Darcy who raised him at the stud farm.

Darcy Wettenhall had been in a secret decade long homosexual relationship with former neighbour and stud farm employee Bob Perry. Darcy had provided Perry with a home and employment at Stanbury after Perry separated from his wife. Their relationship ended about a year prior to the murders.

An autopsy on Darcy Wettenhall revealed he was HIV positive at the time of his death.

The Wettenhall family's stud farm, Stanbury, was sold in 1992 and again on the market in 2015.

Stanbury Jacko is an award-winning Corriedale ram on display at the National Wool Museum in Geelong, donated to the museum by Darcy Wettenhall.
