= Fyansford =

- Suburb
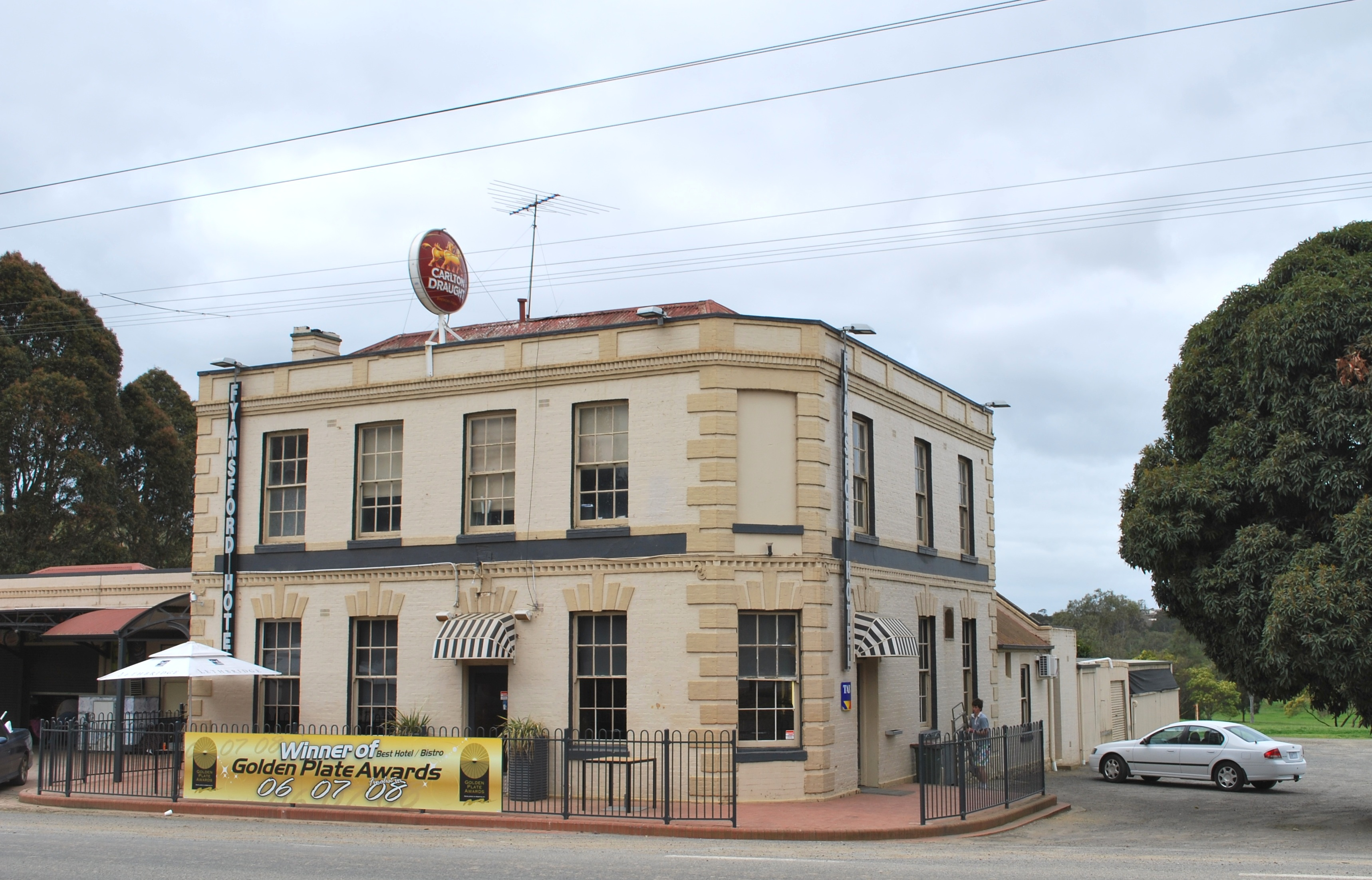
- Fyansford Hotel

- Interactive map of Fyansford
- Coordinates: 38°08′S 144°19′E
- Country: Australia
- State: Victoria
- City: Geelong
- LGA: City of Greater Geelong

Government
  - State electorates: Geelong; Polwarth
  - Federal division: Corio

Population
  - Total: 196 (2016 census)
- Postcode: 3218
Suburbs around Fyansford
Batesford; Stonehaven	Batesford	Hamlyn Heights
Stonehaven	Fyansford	Herne Hill
Barrabool	Ceres; Highton	Newtown

Fyansford is a township on the western edge of Geelong, Victoria, Australia, named after Captain Foster Fyans who came to Geelong as a Police magistrate in October 1837. It is located at the junction of the Barwon and Moorabool rivers. At the 2016 census, Fyansford had a population of 196.

Fyansford is one of the earliest places of settlement in the Geelong region. Fyans established his police camp nearby where the Moorabool could be forded—giving the name Fyan's Ford.

== Industry ==
The area was once a centre for Geelong industry. In 1845 the first flour mill was erected by William Henry Collins on the banks of the Barwon. By 1859 the population was sufficient to justify a Post Office which opened on 1 February 1859 (closing in 1978). The Barwon Paper Mill opened at nearby Buckley Falls in 1876. In 1895 mill became part of the Australian Paper Mills company, the predecessor of Amcor Limited.

Cement production began at Fyansford in 1890 led by Peter McCann, but it was not until 1911 that a modern rotary kiln was installed. The original Australian Portland Cement company plant was located at the foot of the Fyansford hill between Deviation Road and Hyland Street. In 1918 a railway line was extended from the North Geelong railway station to the top of the hill above Fyansford, and in 1926 the narrow gauge Fyansford Cement Works Railway was opened to serve a new quarry, and the works themselves expanded across Hyland Street, which became the main production site, Geelong Cement, in later years. The cement works were later acquired by Adelaide Brighton Cement, and were closed in 2001.

== Transport ==
The Hamilton Highway runs through the town. The first river crossing at Fyansford was a ford, with the first wooden bridge built downriver by the Corio and Bannockburn Shire councils in 1854, and was tolled until 1877. It was in poor condition by 1898, with load restrictions being put into place. A new bridge was built nearby in 1900 by John Monash and J. T. N. Anderson, the three-arch bridge being the largest Monier reinforced concrete bridge in the world at the time. In 1970 a new bridge was built on the site of the old wooden bridge to cater for heavier traffic on the Hamilton Highway, the 1900 bridge retained for pedestrians.

High Street (now Hyland Street) was one of the first sealed roads in the area in 1933, the road being relaid in concrete in 1937. Deviation Road was built between 1931 and 1932 with unemployment labour during the Great Depression and opened in 1933. Cut into the hillside, the surface was originally of concrete construction. The road opened 54 years after the first petition by Fyansford residents for such a road.

== Heritage listed sites ==
Fyansford contains a number of heritage-listed sites, including:

- 42-52 and 100 Lower Paper Mills Rd, Barwon Paper Mill Complex
- 425-465 Hamilton Hwy, Frogmore
- 67 Hyland St, Fyansford Hotel
- Hamilton Hwy, Old Fyansford Bridge
- 150-220 McCurdy Rd, Old Geelong Orphanage Asylum and Common School
- 20-50 Hamilton Hwy, Old Swan Inn

== Census populations ==
- 1861 - 227
- 1901 - 134
- 1933 - 189
- 1961 - 238

== Gallery ==
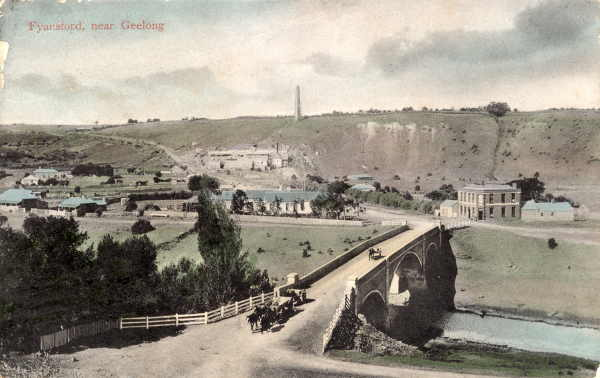
Fyansford, 1908

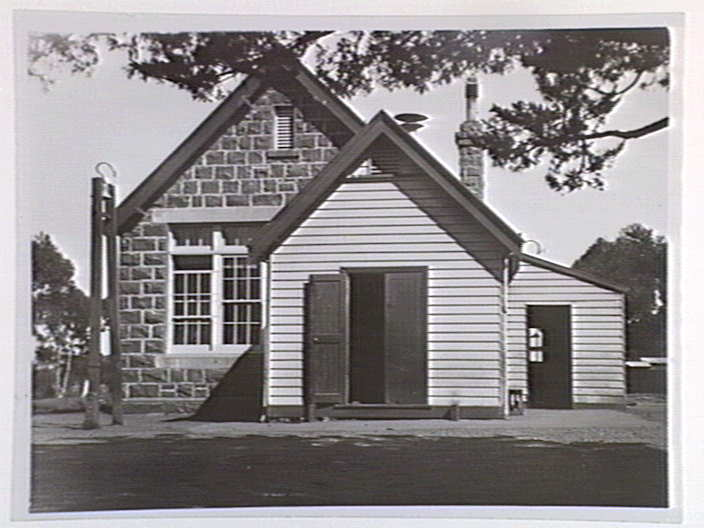
Fyansford State School, built during the 1880s

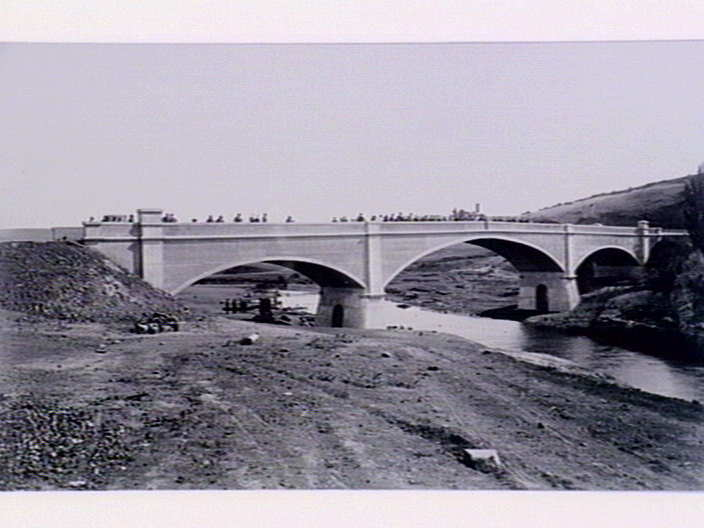
Fyansford Bridge

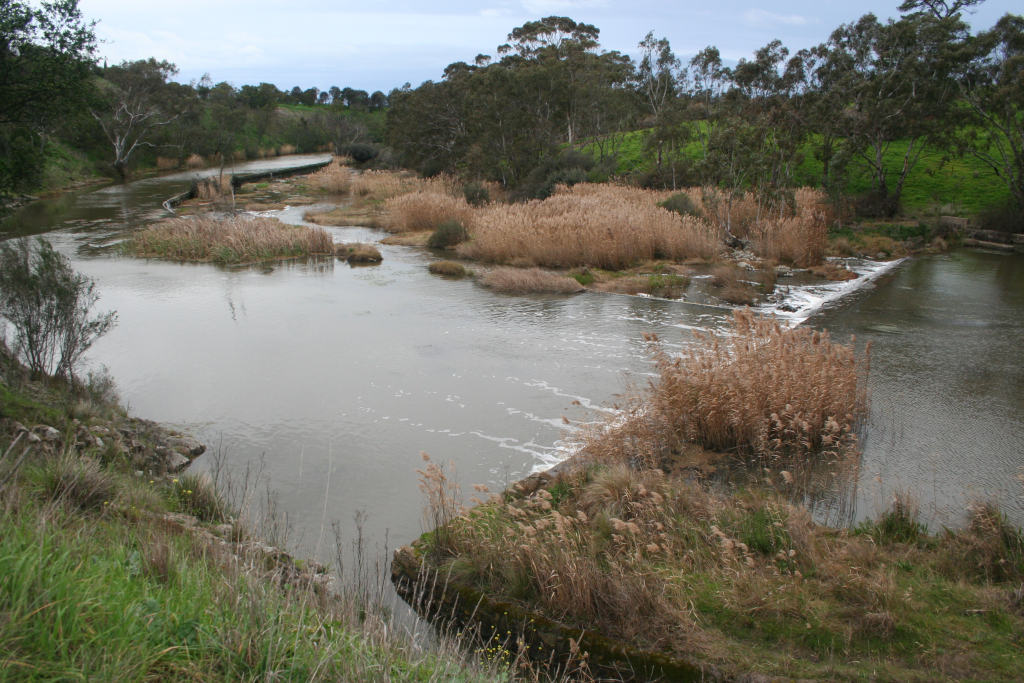
Upstream from Buckley Falls on the Barwon River

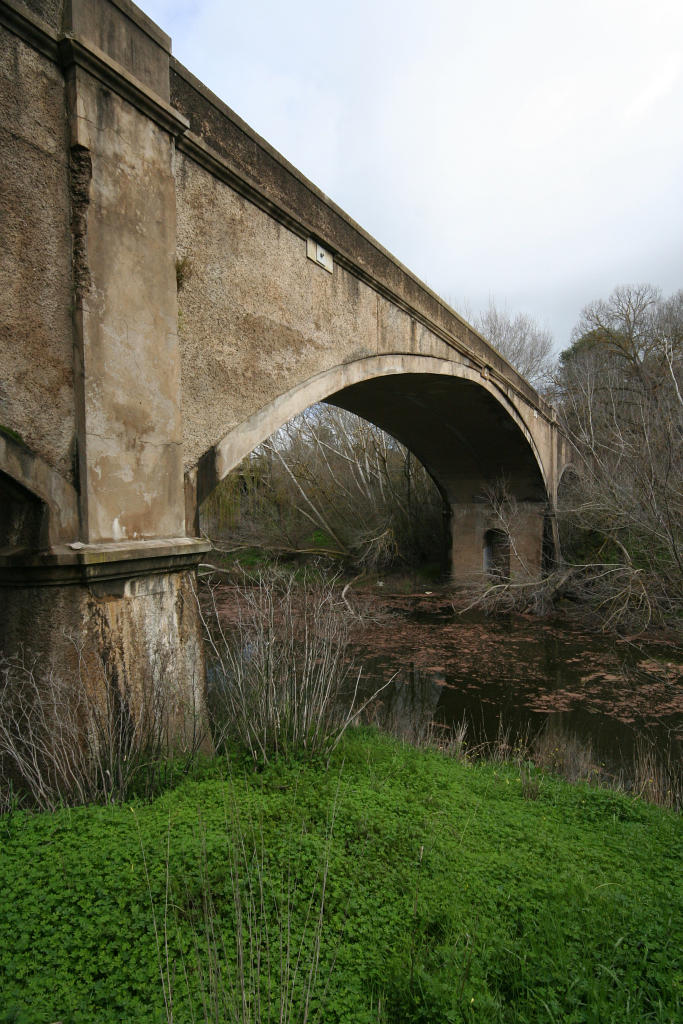
1900 Monier arch bridge over the Moorabool River

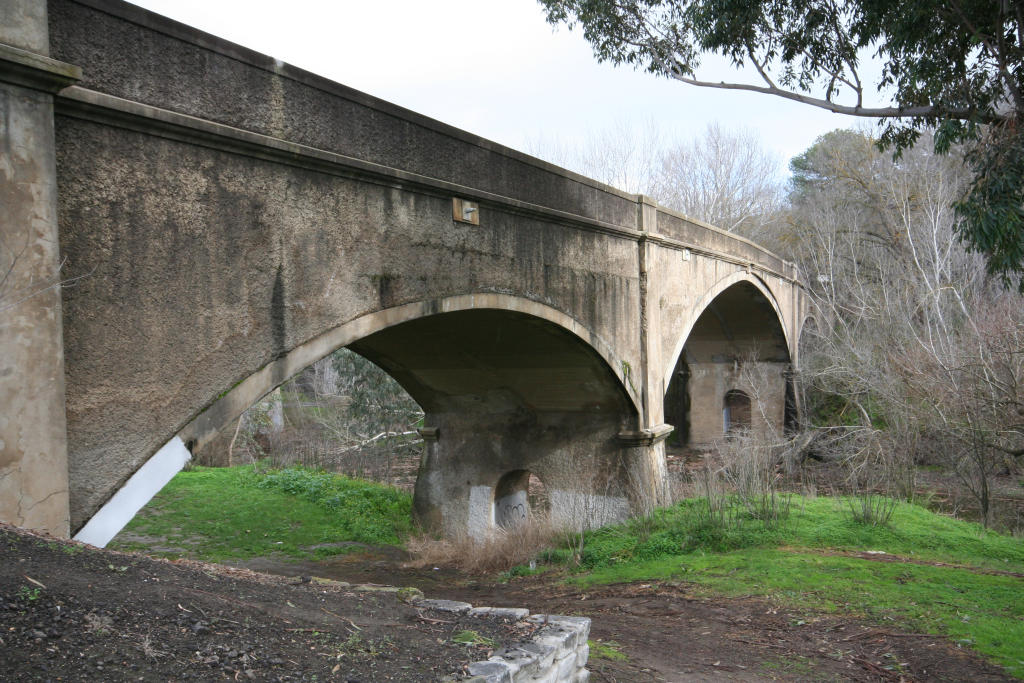
Bridge over the Moorabool

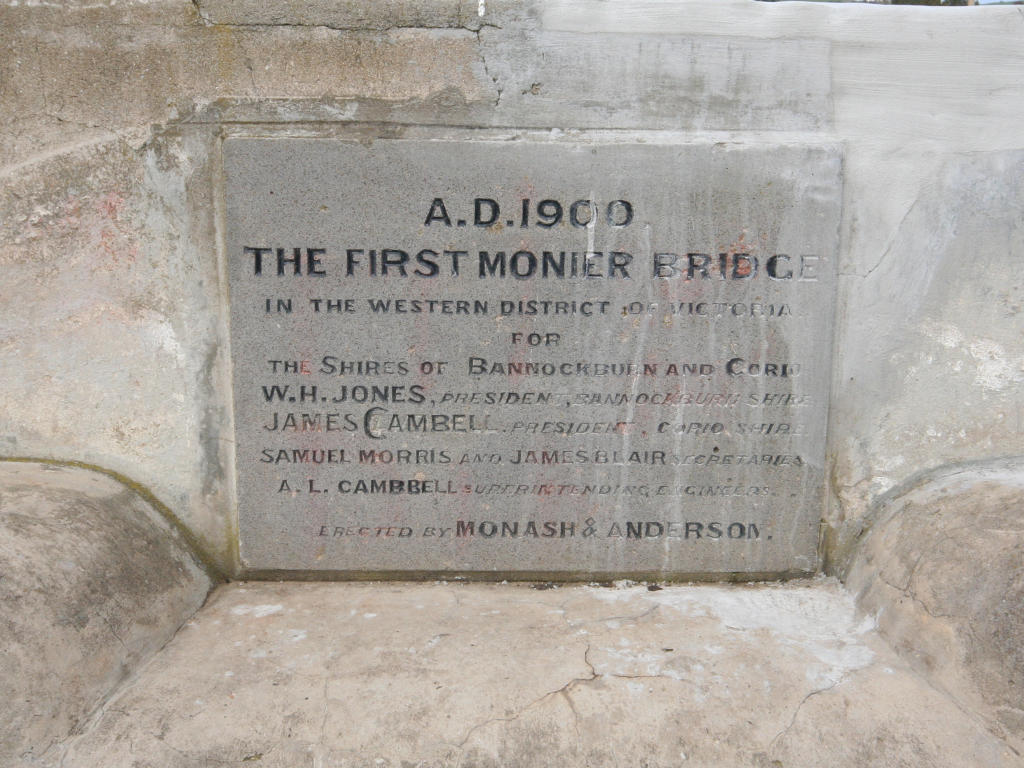
Plaque marking opening of the 1900 bridge

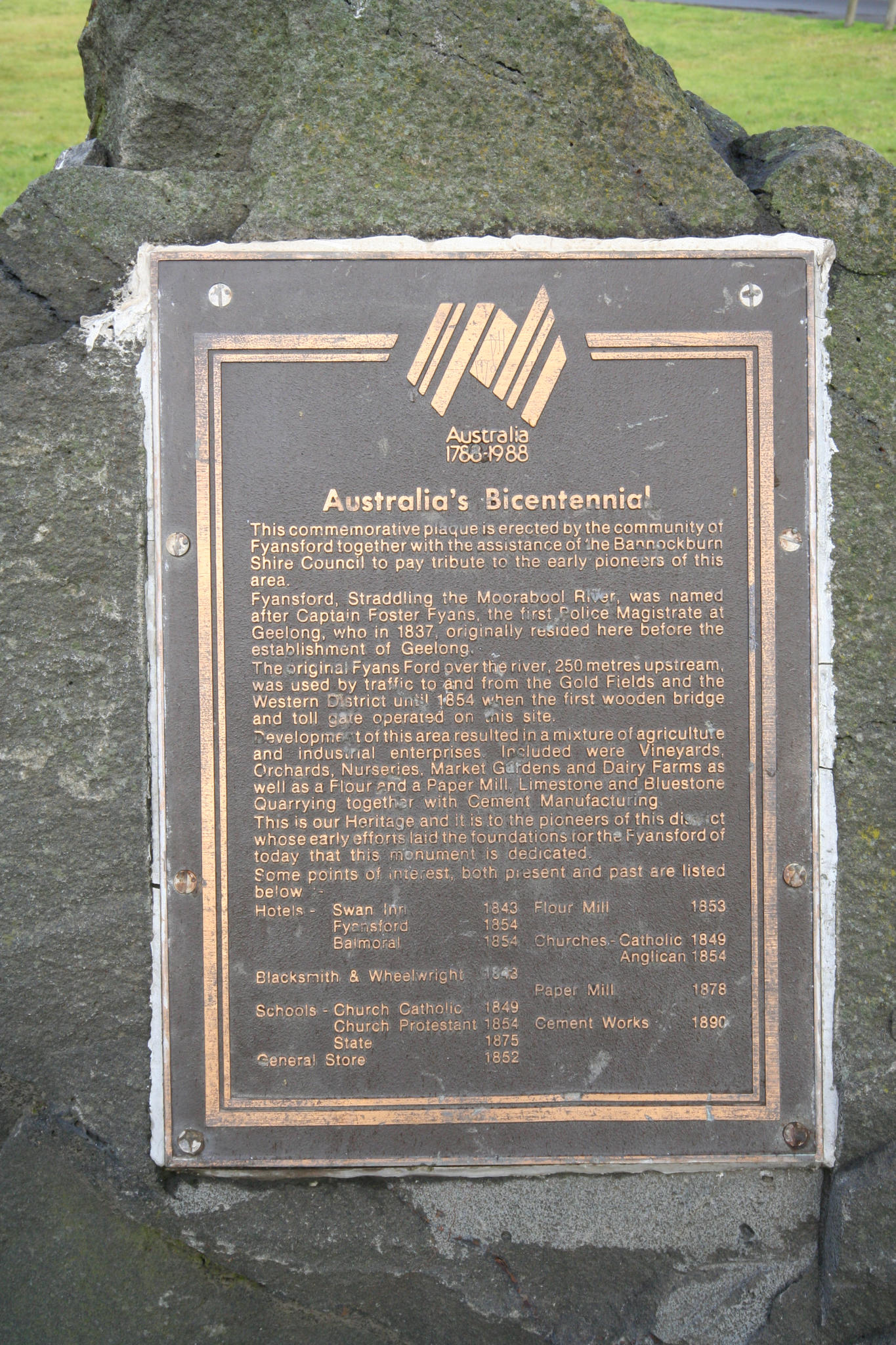
Plaque detailing the history of the township, placed in 1988 for the Australian Bicentenary

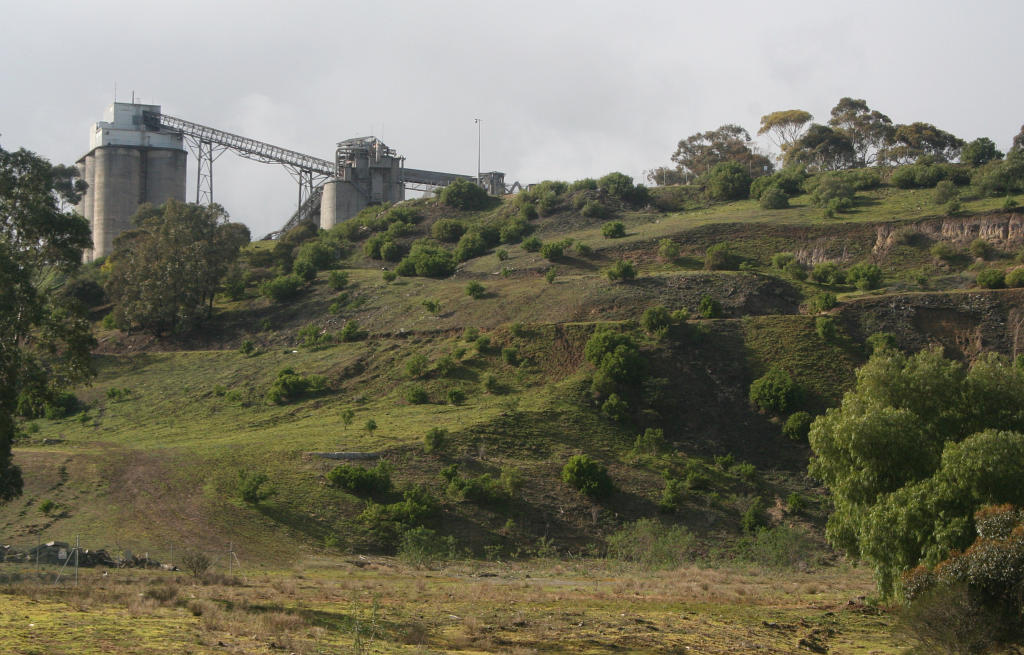
Remains of the Fyansford cement works

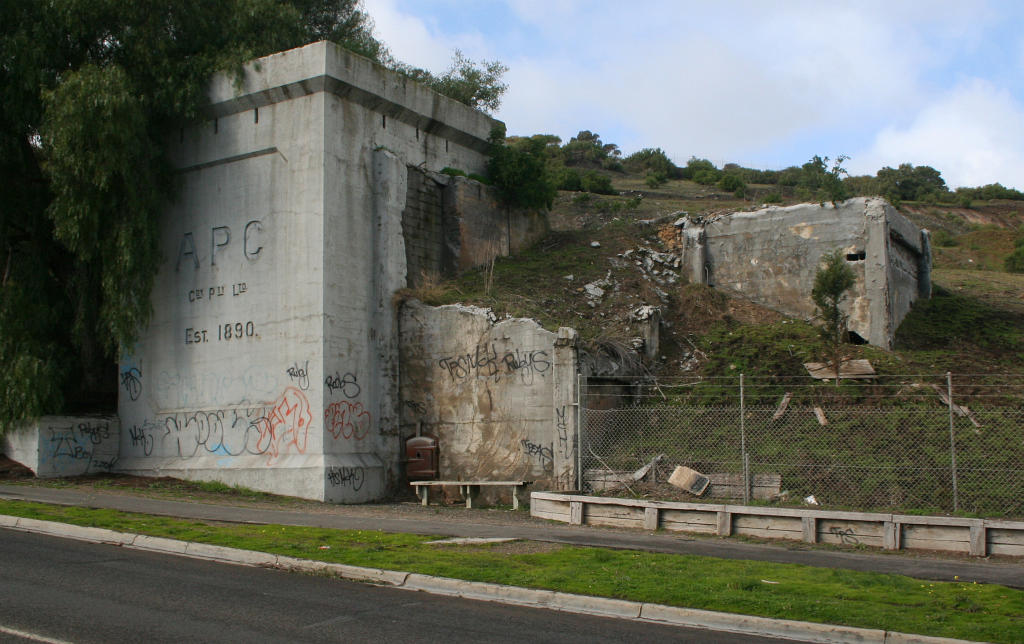
Remains of the Fyansford cement works

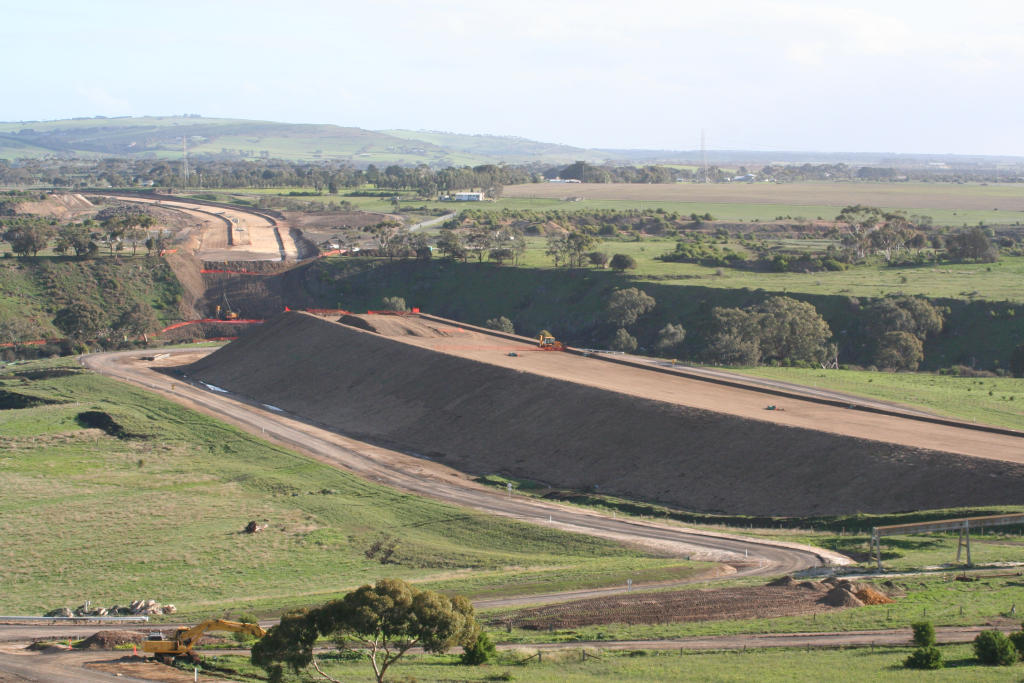
Geelong Bypass crossing of the Moorabool River under construction
