= Wandana Heights =

- Suburb
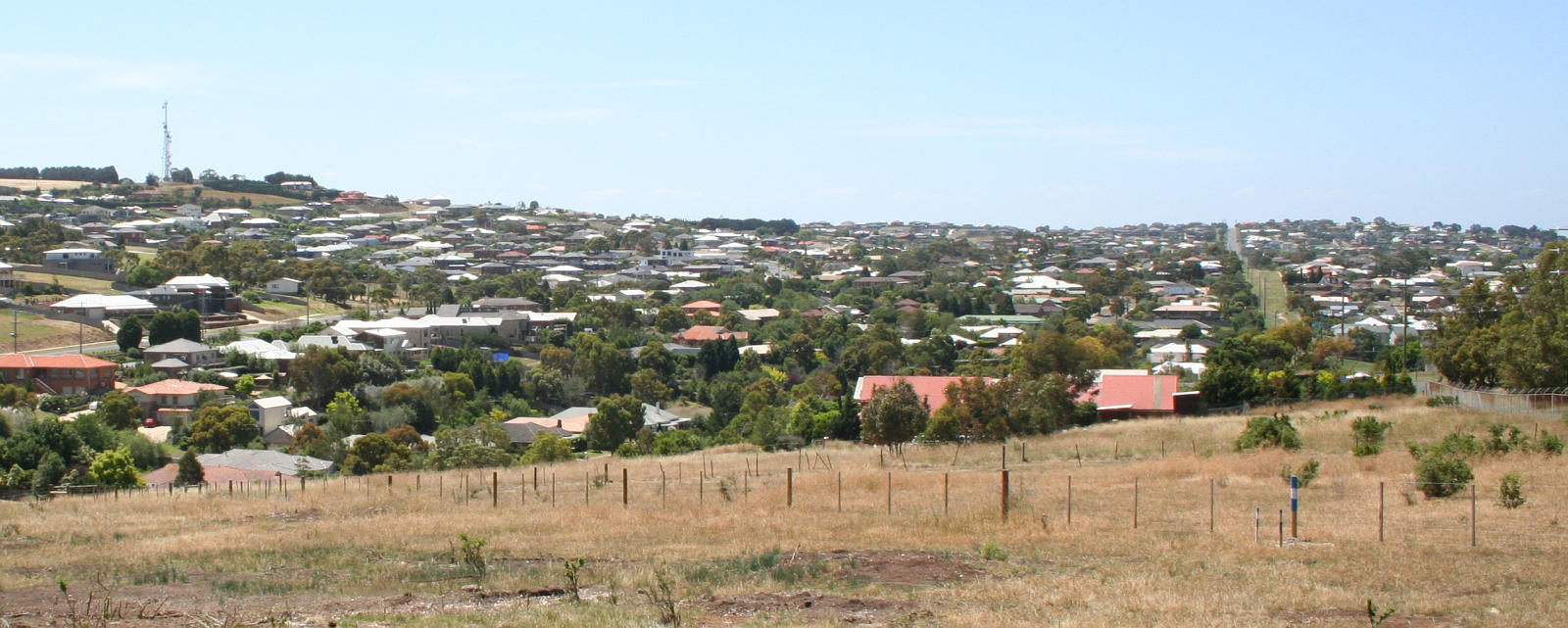
- Looking north to Wandana Heights from Pigdons Road, Highton, 2007

- Interactive map of Wandana Heights
- Coordinates: 38.17°S 144.30°E
- Country: Australia
- State: Victoria
- City: Geelong
- LGA: City of Greater Geelong

Government
  - State electorate: South Barwon
  - Federal divisions: Corangamite; Corio

Population
  - Total: 2,037 (2016 census)
- Postcode: 3216
Suburbs around Wandana Heights
Ceres	Highton	Highton
Ceres	Wandana Heights	Highton
Waurn Ponds	Waurn Ponds	Highton

Wandana Heights is a residential suburb of Geelong, Victoria, Australia. Development of the suburb commenced in the 1980s and was sporadic, due to fluctuations in property prices. There were periods during which has were no new constructions, punctuated by spurts of growth. Due to the expansive views available, the value of land in Wandana Heights is significantly higher than the neighbouring suburb of Highton.

Facilities include the Wandana Heights Reserve, with tennis courts, a playground, and football oval. Drewan Park is a lookout which provides a panoramic view of Geelong, Corio Bay and the surrounding districts.

In 2008, extensive works were undertaken in the area part of the Geelong Ring Road construction.
