= Greg Stewart (triathlete) =

Australian triathlete

Personal information
- Nationality: Australian

Sport
- Sport: Triathlon, duathlon
- Turned pro: 1983
Medal record
Representing Australia
Men's triathlon
Ironman World Championship
| Bronze medal – third place | 1987 Hawaii | Elite |

Greg Stewart is an Australian triathlon and duathlon champion from Highton. He is two times Australian champion in triathlon and two times Australian champion in duathlon.

Since 1983 he competes in triathlon. His first success was in 1986 When he won the Australian championship in intermediate distance triathlon. In 1987 he became third at the Ironman World Championship. Stewart has been a triathlon coach for more than 20 years and has been selector for the Australian team for four years.

== Titles ==
- Australian Champion in intermediate distance triathlon: 1986
- Australian Champion in sprint distance triathlon: 1993
- Australian Champion in duathlon: 1993, 1996

== Notable ranks ==
=== Triathlon ===
- 1985: 15th at Ironman World Championship - 9:53.23
- 1986: 5th at Ironman World Championship - 9:05.10
- 1986: 3rd at Ironman Japan (Note: The event did not have Ironman status that year.)
- 1987: 5th at Nice Triathlon, France
- 1987: 3rd at Ironman World Championship - 8:58:53
- 1989: 5th at ITU World Championship
- 1990: 6th at ITU World Championship
