= Christian College, Geelong =

Private school in Victoria, Australia

Coordinates: 38°11′17″S 144°18′12″E

Christian College
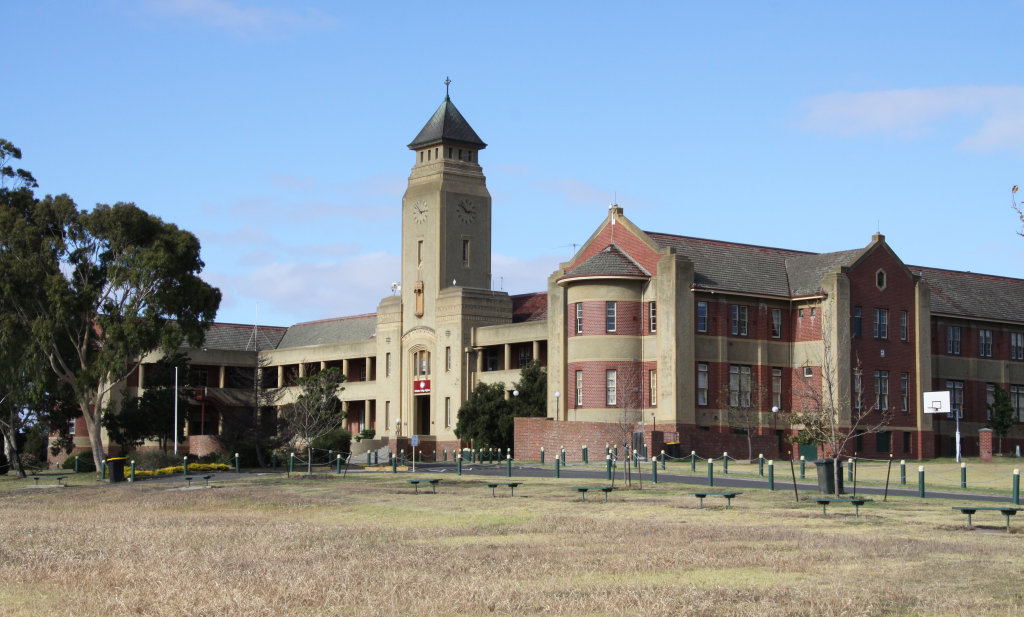
- Middle School building in Highton, the former St. Augustine's Orphanage, 2010
- Geelong, Victoria; Australia

Information
- Type: K–12 private school

Christian College is a K–12 private school located over six campuses in Geelong, Victoria, Australia.

Three campuses are located in suburban Geelong: the Senior Campus at Waurn Ponds (Year 10–12), the Middle School in Highton (Year 5–9), and the Junior School in Belmont (Prep–Year 4). The Bellarine Campus is located in Drysdale (Prep–Year 9), and the Surf Coast campus is located in the coastal town of Torquay, which opened in 2018. There are also two other specialist campuses: "Back Creek" in Scotsburn (near Ballarat) is a dairy farm attended by Year 9 students, including Back Creek Cafe located in Meredith. The specialized Arts center, Villa Paloma, is located off campus in Waurn Ponds a short distance from the Senior School, where VCE Arts students have their classes. Christian College also offers preschool kindergarten programs at the Junior School campus in Belmont (Williams House Kindergarten), and at the Surf Coast campus in Jan Juc (Butterfield House Kindergarten).

Christian College students are from a number of different areas in Geelong, these areas include Torquay, Drysdale, Anglesea, Ocean Grove, Queenscliff and Winchelsea as well as a majority from Geelong itself.

== History ==
The college opened in 1980, in the suburb of Highton and has grown from its original 60 students to over 1900 students in 2007. The Middle School is housed in the former building of St. Augustine's Orphanage, while the Junior School uses the former Glastonbury Orphanage. The Senior Campus is located at the former Highton campus of Geelong Grammar School, which was purchased by Christian College in 1999 and opened to students in 2000. The Bellarine Campus is the former council offices for the Rural City of Bellarine which was amalgamated into the City of Greater Geelong in 1993. The school bought the property in 1995 and started classes in 1996 for students on the Bellarine Peninsula.

== Houses ==
There are four houses at Christian College into which students are split. They are Penman Panthers (red), Flynn Falcons (blue), Taylor Tigers (green) and Burrows Bears (yellow). Burrows (previously known as Hume) is named after Eva Burrows, Taylor after Hudson Taylor, Penman (previously known as Cunningham) after David John Penman and Flynn after John Flynn.

== Music program ==
Christian College has a music program for strings, wind, percussion, piano, brass and bass. The school also has bands, choirs, orchestras, and symphonies that compete every year. In the Melbourne School Bands Festival 2008, Christian College Geelong received a Gold Award in the Advanced Concert Band Section. Christian College also had a tour to Sydney where some of the Christian College Bands performed at the Sydney Opera House. The music department (in conjunction with the drama department) stages a bi-annual school musical, the most recent being Wizard of Oz in April 2013 with "Seussical The Musical" being May 2011.

Recently, the school also travelled to Hawaii to take part in the Annual Pacific Basin Music Festival, and received a gold award.

== Controversy ==
In October 2015, at "Celebration Day" celebrations for the departure of Year 12s, three students arrived in an unauthorised helicopter, causing controversy inside and outside the school, with the incident receiving coverage by local media. The following year's "Celebration Day" for the departure of Year 12s was cancelled due to fear of a repeat event occurring.

== Notable alumni ==
Notable people to have gone to Christian College Geelong include AFL players Gary Ablett, Jr., Nathan Ablett, Matt Maguire, Taylor Adams, Connor Idun, AFLW player Renee Garing, netballer Tegan Philip (nee Caldwell), and Olympian Jakara Anthony.
