= Barrabool =

- Town
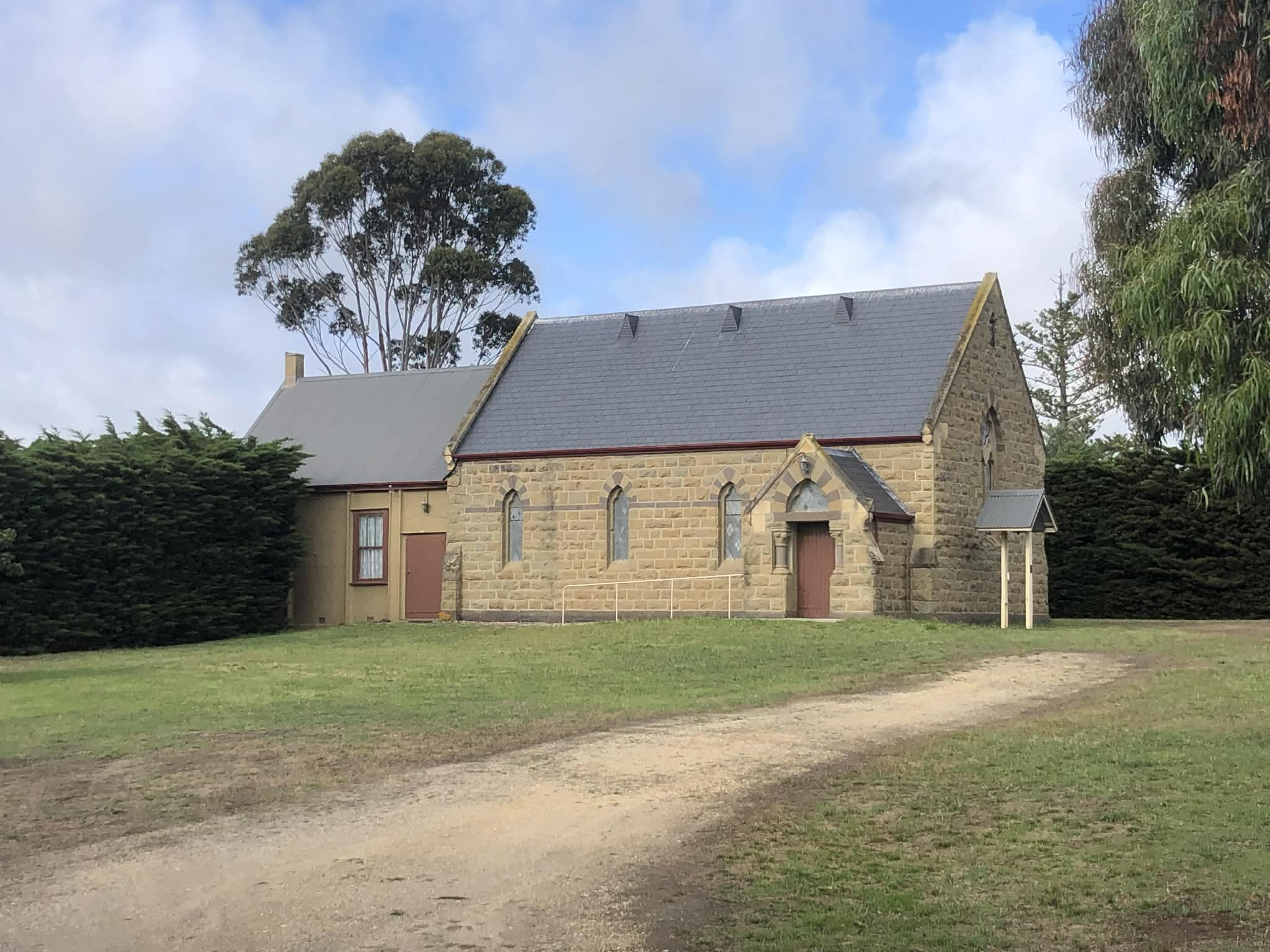
- Barrabool Uniting Church

- Coordinates: 38°09′58″S 144°13′39″E
- Country: Australia
- State: Victoria
- LGA: Surf Coast Shire
- Location: 12 km (7.5 mi) W of Geelong; 76 km (47 mi) SW of Melbourne

Government
  - State electorate: South Barwon
  - Federal division: Wannon

Population
  - Total: 247 (SAL 2021)
- Postcode: 3221
Localities around Barrabool
Stonehaven	Stonehaven	Fyansford
Gnarwarre	Barrabool	Ceres
Mount Moriac	Mount Moriac	Waurn Ponds

Barrabool is a locality in the Surf Coast Shire, Victoria, Australia. In the 2016 census, Barrabool had a population of 235 people.

== History ==
The area was first settled by squatters in the late 1830s. The lands of the Barrabool Parish were first advertised for sale in 1839, with the parish, consisting of 25 blocks of varying size, sold on 5 February 1840. Wynd writes that there was "plenty of competition for the rich lands of the Barrabool Hills", and that the sale was much more successful than subsequent 1840s attempts at selling the land in the nearby Gnarwarre and Modewarre parishes. The 1850s saw the development of the Berramongo Estate and the Suisse Vineyard at Barrabool, both of which survive today, and the land of the broader Barrabool Hills region was seen as having a "reputation for fertility" as a farming district. Wheat was a popular and successful crop initially, but the land began to decline in the 1860s, and Geelong Advertiser wrote in 1868 that "the land on the Barrabool Hills, once so noted for its richness, had become exhausted."

Unlike many of the surrounding areas, a clear township never developed at Barrabool. The first community building was the Holy Trinity Anglican Church School, which was built on the Merrawarp Estate in 1847. The Victorian Heritage Register describes it as "the earliest known school building in the Geelong region". The first Holy Trinity Anglican Church was opened nearby in 1855. Tenders for the adjacent vicarage were called in 1855, but Wynd suggests that the vicarage may not have been completed until 1860. The Anglican school became "School No. 50" under the common school scheme, and the Barrabool State School was established in the building in 1874. The school was closed in 1875, and merged with the Ceres State School; the new school would also be called "Barrabool", but located in modern Ceres. The school, vicarage, and the second Anglican church survive, and are listed on the Victorian Heritage Register. The register reports that the Anglican school is the second earliest surviving school in Victoria.

A Presbyterian denominational school, located on Barrabool Road, opened on 19 May 1858 on part of the former "Strathlachlan" estate. A Presbyterian manse was then built, with the foundation stone laid on 25 November 1859. A Presbyterian church was officially opened on 9 April 1871. The school became common school No. 73 in 1863, and a new stone school building was built in the 1870s, with tenders called in 1874. The Presbyterian school closed later that decade, and would later be briefly used for the revived Barrabool State School. The Presbyterian church survives as the Barrabool Uniting Church.

A Bible Christian Church was established at the corner of Polleys and Balanclea Roads in the 1850s, with the foundation stone laid on 17 November 1856. Wynd reports a Wesleyan church and school were also existent in the 1850s, further west on Polleys Road. These churches have long since closed; their closure dates are unknown.

The original Barrabool State School that had been closed and merged with Ceres in 1875 re-opened in 1921, initially in the stone building that had served as the Presbyterian school in the late 1870s. A new two-acre site opposite had been purchased, and a new building for the school was built thereafter. The school closed in the 20th century, though its closure date is unknown. The Public Record Office records "Barrabool Hills" as a former name for the school; the date of this usage is also unknown.

A postal receiving office opened at Barrabool around 1902, and closed on 23 December 1914. A returning office again opened there on 1 August 1921, became Barrabool Post Office on 1 July 1927, and closed on 30 June 1963.

== Barrabool today ==
The Surf Coast Shire heritage overlay protects eleven surviving buildings in Barrabool with heritage value: the Holy Trinity Anglican Church School, Holy Trinity Anglican Church and Parsonage and the Neuchatel property, which are also listed on the Victorian Heritage Register, the "Ballanclea", "Tasman", "Foymount", "Berramongo", and "Merrawarp" homesteads, Wescott's Stable, the Barrabool Presbyterian Church, and the "Stanbury" barn.

The Barrabool Cricket Club remains active, fielding four senior men's teams in the Bellarine Peninsula Cricket Association, a senior women's team in the Barwon Women's Cricket Competition and four junior teams in the Geelong Junior Cricket Association. The Barrabool Memorial Gates at the entrance to the local sports ground are listed on the Victorian War Heritage Inventory, as they were dedicated in memory of World War I and the first pioneers of the district.

The Uniting Church holds fortnightly services at their Barrabool church (the former Presbyterian church) on the corner of Andersons and Barrabool Roads. The Anglican church no longer holds services, but is open to viewings by appointment.

The McAdam Park motocross race track was located at Barrabool from 1962 until 2015, when it closed after a community campaign by the Barrabool Rural Protection Group against the facility and a Victorian Civil and Administrative Tribunal decision blocking its redevelopment. The site was subsequently divided into three residential lots.
