= Highton =

Suburb of Geelong in Victoria, Australia

- Suburb
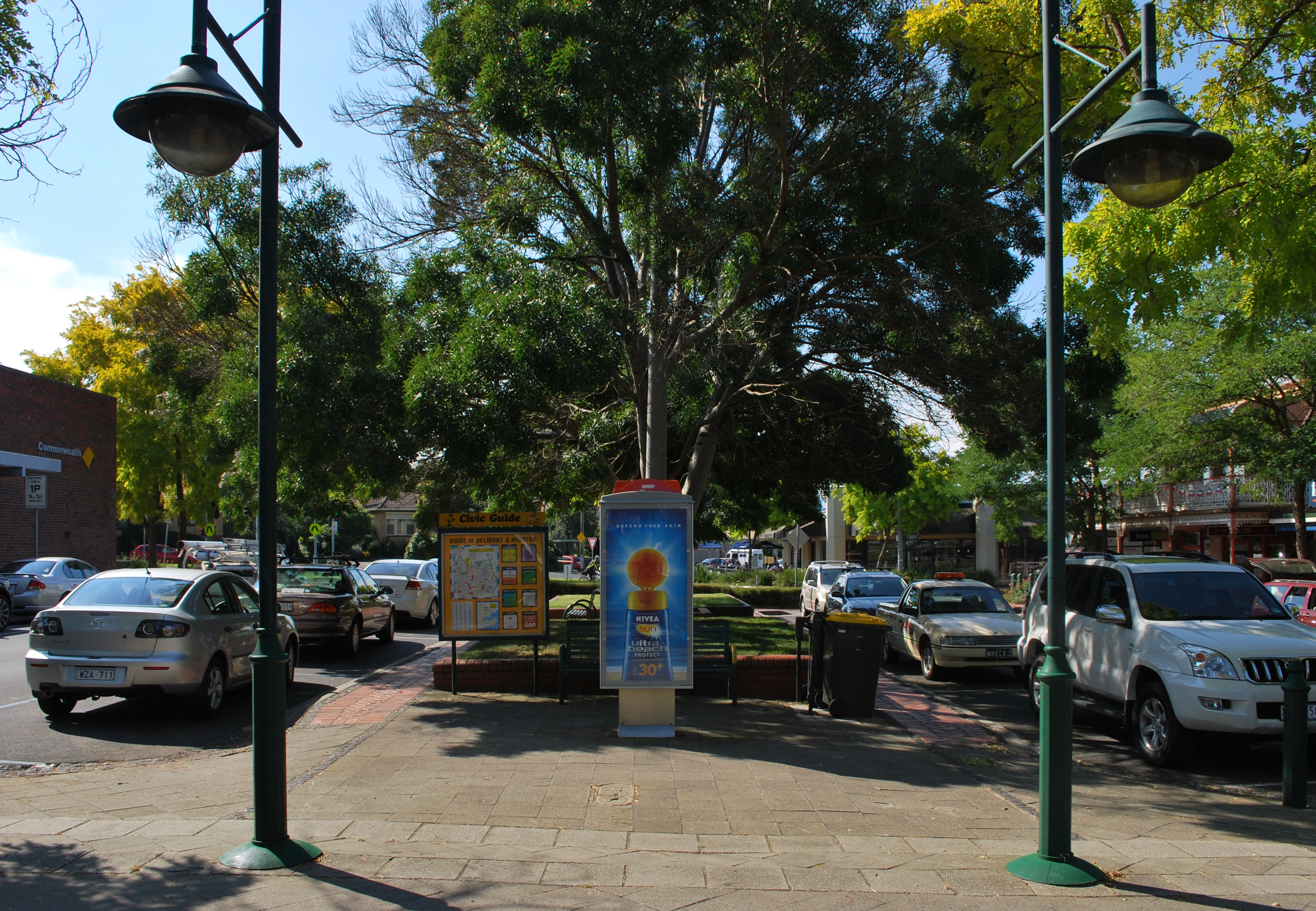
- Belle Vue Avenue

- Interactive map of Highton
- Coordinates: 38.171°S 144.318°E
- Country: Australia
- State: Victoria
- City: Geelong
- LGA: City of Greater Geelong

Government
  - State electorates: Geelong; South Barwon
  - Federal divisions: Corangamite; Corio

Population
  - Total: 17,793 (2016 census)
- Postcode: 3216
Suburbs around Highton
Fyansford	Fyansford and Newtown	Newtown
Ceres and Wandana Heights	Highton	Belmont
Waurn Ponds	Grovedale	Belmont

Highton is a residential suburb of Geelong, Victoria, Australia. With views across Geelong, Corio Bay and the surrounding region, Highton is located along the banks of the Barwon River and across the rolling Barrabool Hills. The Barwon River straddles Highton to the north and east, while it is bordered by the hilly Ceres and Wandana Heights to the west, the former (and now underground) Kardinia Creek separates the suburb from Belmont to the south-east, and the Princes Highway and Pigdons Road to the south separate the suburb from Waurn Ponds.

== History ==
Grazier John Highett set up a farm and finished building his house on a hill overlooking the Barwon River in 1834. Two years later his wife and daughter moved in with him.Later his property became the Montpellier vineyard, hotel and picnic ground. Highton was named after an abbreviation of his name. Reserves, reservoirs and a school in this beautiful suburb still bear the Montpellier name. The ruins of the original property still exist in Montpellier Park.

The district had been extensively subdivided by the mid-1860s and boasted a hotel, a post office (opened on 1 December 1864) and a population of about 300 people. Vineyards, orchards and farmland were the major commercial activities for some decades. Between 1927 and 1933, two major orphanages and the Glastonbury children's home were opened in the suburb.

Residential development reached Highton by the post war 1950s, the scenic hills overlooking the Barwon River valley being popular with residents. The Highton shopping centre in Bellevue Avenue was constructed in the mid-1960s. Highton Post Office moved here in 1965 and a Highton South office opened the same year. Kardinia Creek separating the suburb from Belmont was placed underground. Further residential expansion continued southwards and by the 1990s housing had reached the Glastonbury Drive area.

Major residential developments in the area north of Barrabool Road and west of Scenic Road have seen a sizeable increase in the suburb's population.

== Education ==
Highton has three state run primary schools. Highton Primary School was the first school in the area, opening in 1854. While post-world war two growth led to the opening of Bellaire Primary School in 1963 and Montpellier Primary School in 1969.

Belmont High School is the only state run high school in the area. It opened in 1945 and is still open to this day.

Christian College, a co-denominational Christian school, opened in the former St Augustine's orphanage in 1980 and offers the suburb's only independendent primary and secondary school. Formerly, Geelong Grammar School occupied a campus in Highton from 1962 to 1998. However, this campus is now part of Christian College which now has three campuses in the suburb.

Highton is also located in close proximity to Deakin University's Waurn Ponds campus and the southern section of the suburb has a high student population.

== Healthcare ==
Highton has multiple medical surgeries and pharmacies. It is also noted that Epworth HealthCare operates a private hospital in Pigdons Road, Waurn Ponds which is across the road from many residents of Highton as Pigdons Road separates the two suburbs. The nearest public hospital University Hospital Geelong located in Geelong's central business district.

== Shopping ==
Highton has two smaller shopping centres namely: Highton Village is a boutique shopping strip in Belle Vue Avenue containing specialty shops and a supermarket. In 2016 Barrabool Hills Plaza opened in Provence Blvd containing a Woolworths Supermarket and some small speciality shops. There is another small strip of shops containing a bakery, post office, and small cafes along Porter Avenue.

== Sport ==
Running, walking and bike riding are also popular activities along the Barwon River as tracks exists to enable such pursuits. Popular spots to begin include near Queens Park. Highton Reserve is the home of the Geelong Falcons training ground the complete in the AFL under 18 TAC League.

Queens Park also contains a golf course called the Queens Park Public Golf Course and hosts both the Geelong Amateur Football & Netball Club and the Newtown and Chilwell Cricket Club.

There is a sporting precinct near Highton Village which hosts the Geelong Falcons. This sporting precinct is also home to the Highton Tennis Club and Highton Bowls Club.

On the boundary between Highton and Belmont is a third sporting field, home to the South Barwon Football and Netball Club.

== Transport ==
Highton is connected by road to the centre of Geelong by Barrabool Road, Shannon Avenue, and the Princes Highway. Traffic to Melbourne is able to use the Geelong Ring Road that passes to the west of the suburb.

Public transport to the area is provided by buses operated by McHarry's Buslines and CDC Geelong, under contract to Public Transport Victoria. The two routes run from Geelong railway station to Deakin University at Waurn Ponds, via the Geelong city centre. Route 42 serves the southern area of the suburb, also running through Belmont and Grovedale, and Route 43 serves the northern area, also running through Newtown.

Trams used to operate through the outskirts of Highton, until 1956 when Geelong trams were replaced with buses.

== Notable people ==
Notable people from or who have lived in Highton include:

- Greg Stewart, an Australian triathlon and duathlon champion.

== See also ==
- The Hermitage had a campus in Highton from 1960 to 1976 and then amalgamated with Geelong Grammar School.
