= Stonehaven, Victoria =

Stonehaven Geelong, Victoria
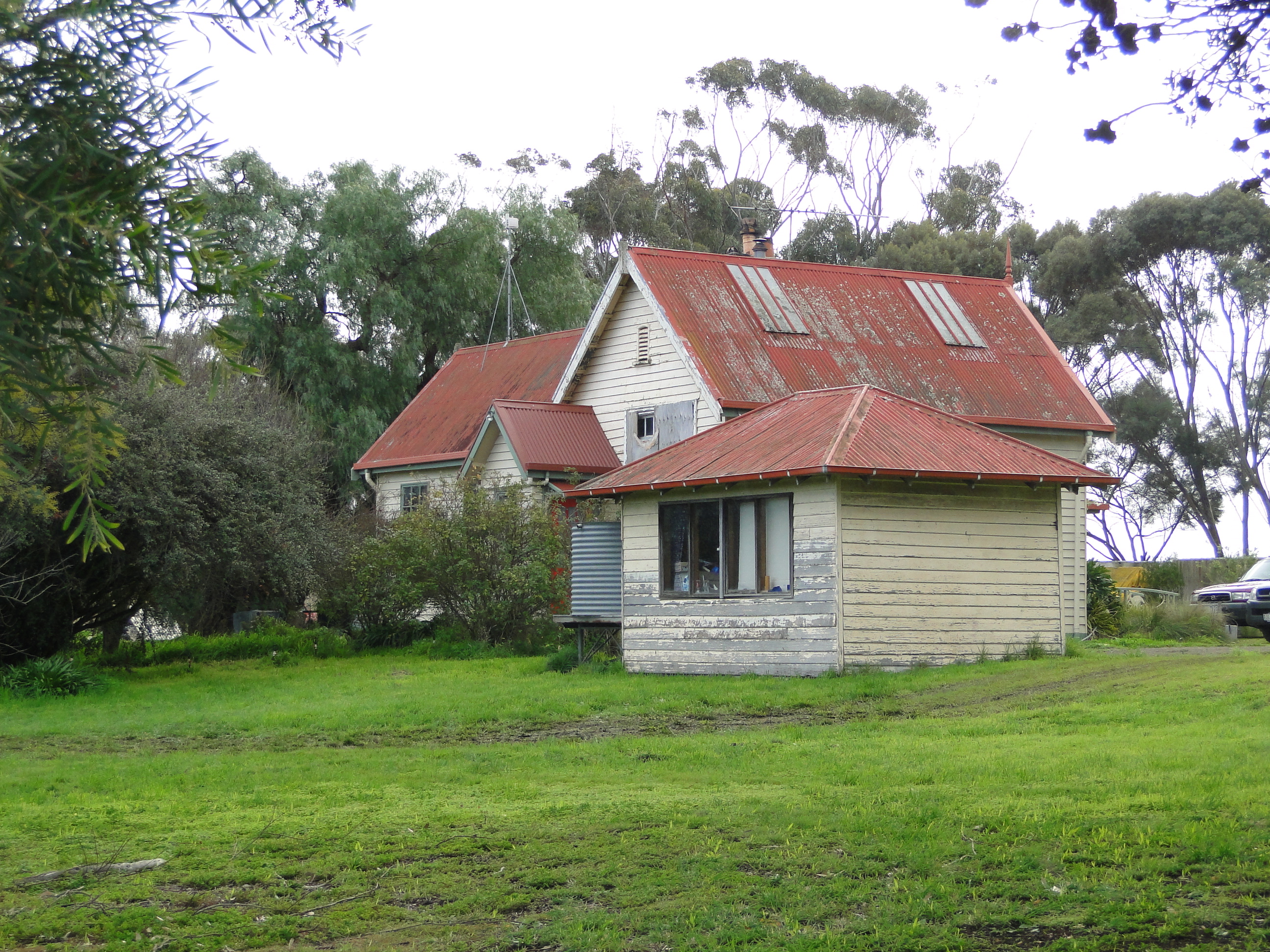
- Former school at Stonehaven

- Coordinates: 38°07′21″S 144°13′31″E
- Population: 79 (SAL 2021)
- Postcode(s): 3221
- LGA(s): Golden Plains Shire
- State electorate(s): Polwarth
- Federal division(s): Corio
Suburbs around Stonehaven:
Bannockburn	Gheringhap	Batesford
Murgheboluc	Stonehaven	Fyansford
Gnarwarre	Barrabool	Ceres

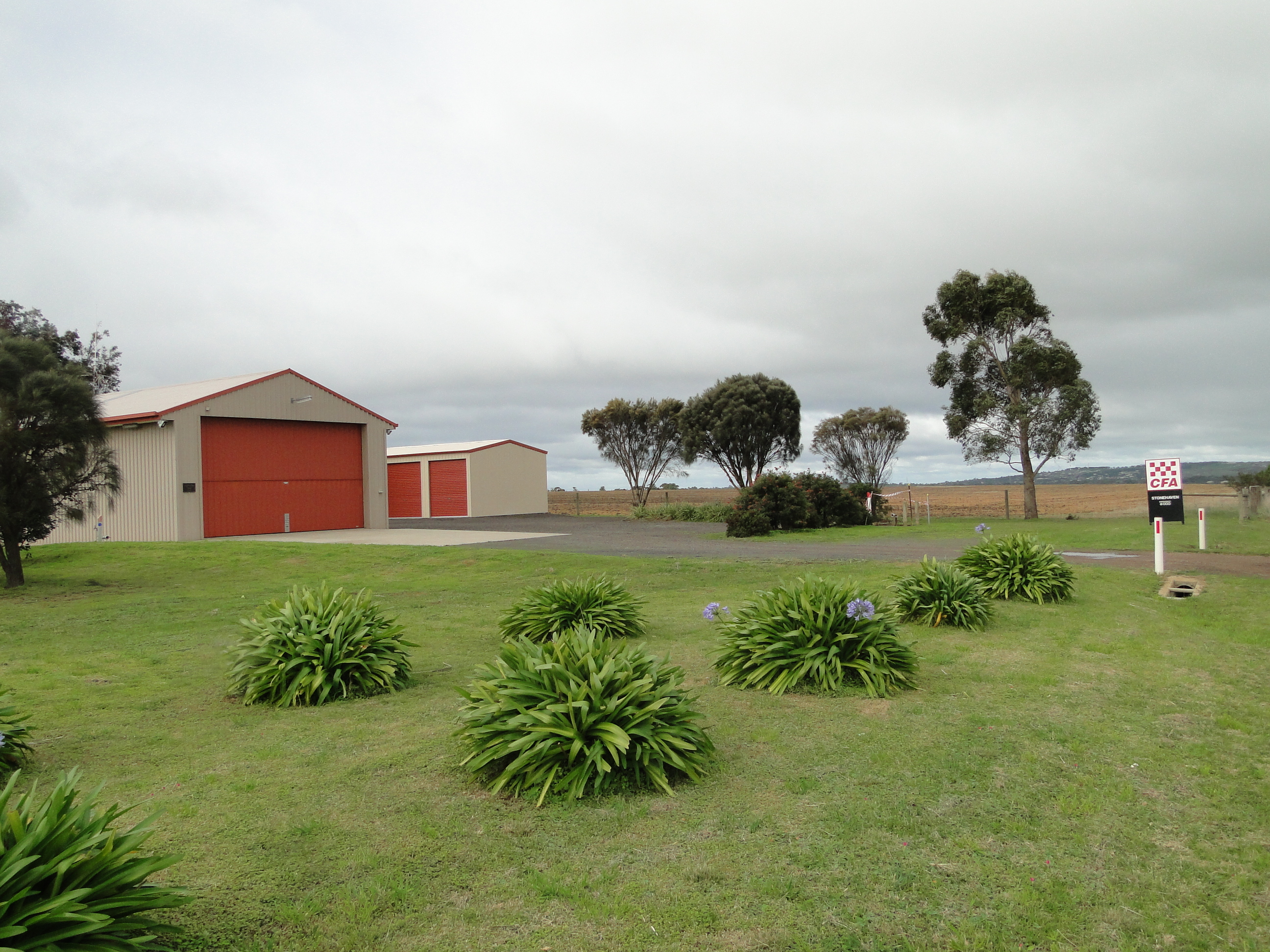
Stonehaven CFA

Stonehaven is a locality about 10 km west of Geelong, Victoria, on the Hamilton Highway. It consists of a number of scattered farmhouses, the former primary school building (now a private residence), a community hall (now derelict) and a Country Fire Authority (CFA) fire station. The fire station is sometimes used as a polling booth for state and federal elections. The Ceres Bridge Estate winery has its vineyard in Stonehaven, producing chardonnay and pinot noir.

The community started agitating for a post office as early as 1883, when over 30 people signed a petition to the government. The Stonehaven Post Office opened in 1927 and was closed in 1958.

The school was No. 2199. A contract for £320 15s 6d to build a wooden school building was given to H. Moran in April 1879. From 1879 to 1926 the school was known as the Lower Leigh State School. In 1880 the teacher, J. McCann, wrote to the Geelong Advertiser about the difficulty students from Barrabool had reaching the school after a flood had damaged the bridge. In 1935 the Public Works Department approved additions to the teacher's residence at the school to a value of £309.

In 1953, farmers discovered rabbits at Stonehaven which had become immune to myxomatosis. These so-called "super rabbits" had appeared only three years after the virus had been released to control rabbit numbers.

In 2012 a CFA fire truck became bogged in a paddock at Stonehaven while fighting a grass fire. The crew had to abandon the $500,000 tanker which was extensively damaged by the fire.
