= Gnarwarre =

- Coordinates: 38°09′29″S 144°08′23″E
- Country: Australia
- State: Victoria
- LGA: Surf Coast Shire
- Location: 18 km (11 mi) W of Geelong; 82 km (51 mi) SW of Melbourne

Government
  - State electorate: South Barwon
  - Federal division: Wannon

Population
  - Total: 297 (SAL 2021)
- Postcode: 3221
Localities around Gnarwarre
Inverleigh	Murgheboluc	Stonehaven
Inverleigh	Gnarwarre	Barrabool
Buckley	Buckley; Mount Moriac	Mount Moriac

Gnarwarre is a locality in the Surf Coast Shire, Victoria, Australia. In the 1800s, the locality was alternately known as Shankhill. In the 2016 census, Gnarwarre had a population of 267 people.

== History ==
The area was first settled by squatters in the late 1830s. The Gnarwarre Parish was first advertised for sale in 1839, with the parish, consisting of 22 lots of 640 acres or bigger, put up for sale on 10 June 1840. The sale was dramatically less successful than the February sale of blocks in the Barrabool Parish, with only four blocks being sold; virtually all of the remainder would be eventually sold in the 1850s. The Gnarwarre Parish did not see the same significant subdivision that occurred in the nearby Modewarre and Duneed parishes, which Wynd attributes to the land being seen as more suitable for grazing.

The population in the Gnarwarre area, as opposed to areas further east, was largely Catholic. A Catholic school was established at Gnarwarre in 1853, and was used as a church on Sundays. A more permanent school building was slowly constructed over several years, and finally opened on 2 February 1862; Wynd suggests that poverty on the part of the local population had meant that further work was only done when funds became available. An Anglican school also opened at Gnarwarre in November 1856, and a Primitive Methodist church opened around 1865. The Catholic school became a common school, then in 1872 the first Gnarwarre State School, but was closed down at the end of 1874 as it was to be replaced by a new school on a new two-acre site.

The Shankhill Hotel was opened by James Murphy in 1856, but was burned down in 1864 and not rebuilt. The Gnarwarre Hotel was opened by Patrick Corbett in 1864 on a site "a little distance west" of the former hotel. A post office opened on 1 October 1857. In addition to the hotel, in 1861, Gnarwarre had a butcher, a blacksmith, and store. The former Catholic church and school ceased being used for services from around 1900, was used as a dance hall during World War I, and was demolished in 1959. The Gnarwarre Hotel closed in 1922 and was demolished in 1968. Gnarwarre Post Office closed on 30 June 1963.

Gnarwarre State School would outlive the remainder of the village, but closed and opened numerous times with changing student numbers. The school, having opened on a new site from the old Catholic school at the start of 1875, closed in 1879–80, reopened in 1881, closed again from 1950 to 1956, and was re-opened again in 1957. It was replaced by a new school in the 1960s, but closed permanently in 1991 because of falling student numbers. Wynd, writing in 1992, states that some of Gnarwarre's buildings survived until the 1960s, but that a motorist would see "absolutely nothing to recall the existence of Shankhill/Gnarwarre."

There were also three unsuccessful attempts at founding other settlements within the modern Gnarwarre locality: Lanark, Barwon, and Pollocksford. Lanark was advertised as being at the junction of what is now Mount Pollock Road at Gnarwarre; a street pattern was laid out, and a land auction took place on 23 January 1854. Wynd notes that there is "no record of who bought land, and no evidence that any settlement ever developed there". Barwon was auctioned on 9 March 1854, advertised as being "on the Ballarat Road". It was described in the Geelong Advertiser in 1874 as being "a sort of no man's land where anybody and everybody runs their stock" and had disappeared by the 1880s. Pollocksford, straddling the Barwon River in modern Gnarwarre and Murgheboluc, was marked for a settlement, and an Anglican school was proposed there in the 1860s, but was never built.

== Gnarwarre today ==
The Gnarwarre Public Hall and a Country Fire Authority station are located at Gnarwarre.

Gnarwarre is a base for two major horseracing studs. Tony Santic, the owner of Melbourne Cup-winning horse Makybe Diva, bases his breeding and training outfit, Makybe Racing and Breeding, at Gnarwarre. A second operator, Rosemont Stud, also operates in Gnarwarre, and bought 44% of the Makybe farm in 2012. The locality is also home to a major wool-growing property, Roxby Park.

Graeme Lloyd, the first Australian to play in a winning World Series baseball team, was raised in Gnarwarre.
