= Ceres, Victoria =

Ceres Geelong, Victoria
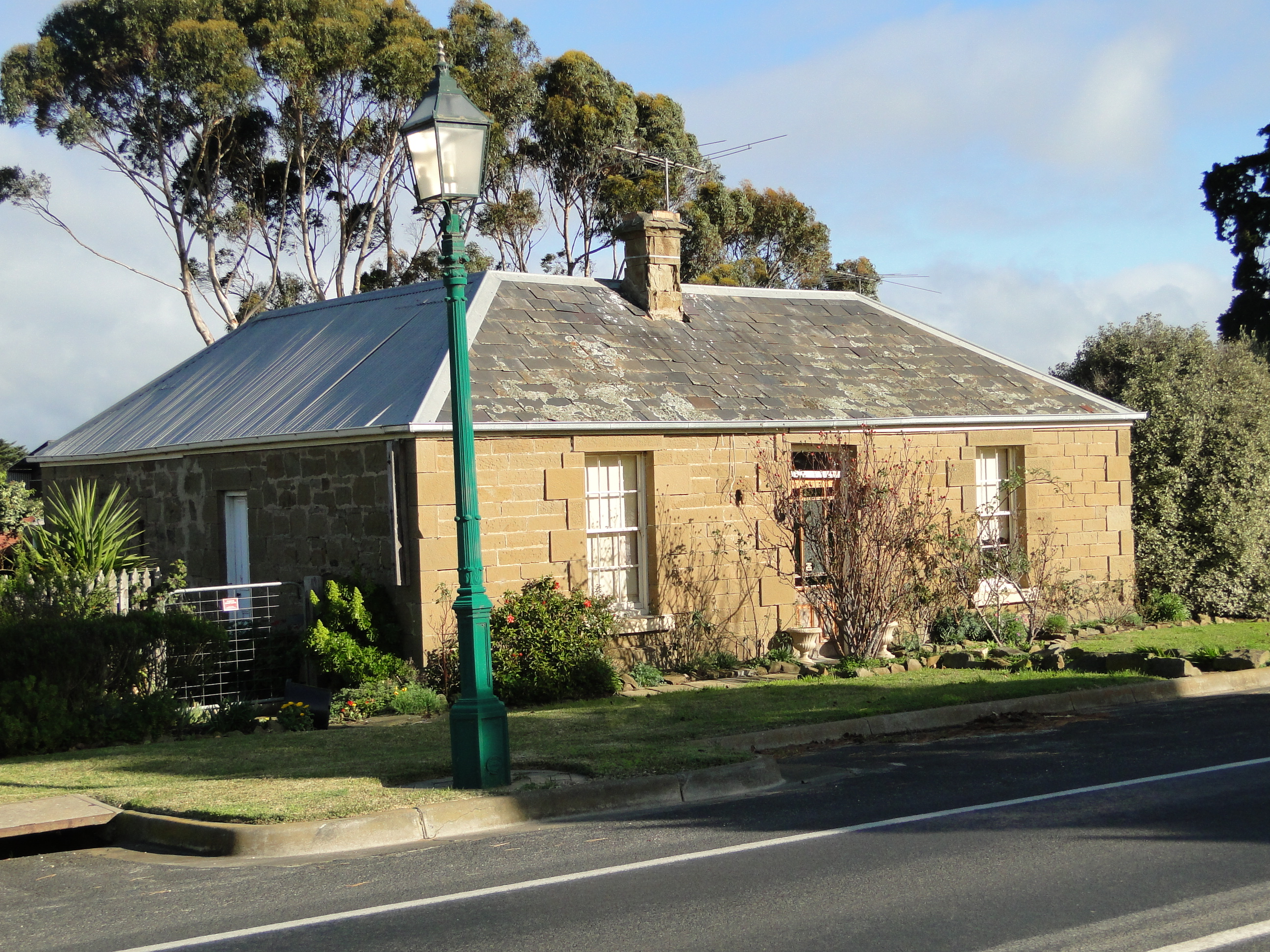
- Historic stone house at Ceres

- Coordinates: 38°10′S 144°16′E
- Population: 254 (2016 census)
- Postcode(s): 3221
- LGA(s): City of Greater Geelong
- State electorate(s): South Barwon
- Federal division(s): Corangamite
Suburbs around Ceres:
Stonehaven	Fyansford	Fyansford
Barrabool	Ceres	Wandana Heights and Highton
Barrabool	Waurn Ponds	Waurn Ponds

Ceres is a locality in Geelong, Victoria, Australia. As one of the highest points in Geelong, Ceres has a lookout which overlooks the city. In the 2016 census, Ceres had a population of 254 people.

== History ==
The Ceres area was first settled by squatters in the late 1830s, and the lots of the Barrabool Parish were advertised in 1839, with the land being sold on 5 February 1840. There was reportedly "plenty of competition" for the Barrabool Hills lands, and the area became part of "Roslin", owned by David Fisher. The government had not provided for a settlement in the Barrabool Parish, and Fisher, after selling much of his estate in 1846, advertised a section of the remainder for sale as the new village of Ceres in March 1850. The town is presumably named after the Roman goddess of agriculture or less likely the dwarf planet or more likely the village of Ceres in Fife, Scotland since it is in an area called Roslin which is in Scotland.

The first business to open in Ceres was the Wheat Sheaf Inn in September 1850, which became a social centre for much of the Barrabool district. A second hotel, the Rising Sun, opened in 1853. The Post Office opened on 14 February 1856. In 1856, the village was reported to have the Seidel Bros. vineyard, a blacksmith's forge and quarrier, a physician, a store, a shoemaker, a post office, a butcher, a surgeon, the two hotels, and a second forge. Coal was first discovered at Ceres in 1842, and a shaft sunk in 1854, but despite much excitement economical quantities were never found. A meeting at Ceres on 10 November 1855 agreed to build a cemetery, which subsequently opened as the Barrabool Hills Cemetery (now Highton Cemetery) in modern Highton.

A Wesleyan church and school building opened at Ceres in 1865. The Wesleyan school became a common school and then the first Ceres State School (No. 15), but was closed in 1875 and merged with the then Barrabool State School (No. 50) to form a new state school (No. 1602). The new school, physically located in what is now Ceres, was initially named Barrabool, but was renamed the Ceres State School in 1890.

The Ceres Literary Association developed in 1855 and began construction of a mechanics' institute; the building was partially completed in 1859 when the organisation disbanded. The Ceres Total Abstinence society began agitating for their own hall in 1861 and completed it in 1862. Wynd suggests that it is unclear if this was merely the completion of the prior hall, or an entirely new building. The building survives today, and is now home to the Theatre of the Winged Unicorn. A third hotel, the Barrabool Inn, was built in 1861.

The village grew in population into the 1890s, but had begun its decline before this. The Wheat Sheaf Inn and the Rising Sun hotels closed in the 1870s. Most of the Wheat Sheaf Inn was demolished, apart from the dining room, which was retained as a hayshed. It was later damaged in a storm, and the stone donated to the Shire of Barrabool. The Rising Sun was demolished entirely. The Barrabool Inn operated until 1909, when its license lapsed and it became a private house; it was demolished in the twentieth century. The Ceres Post Office closed in 1962.

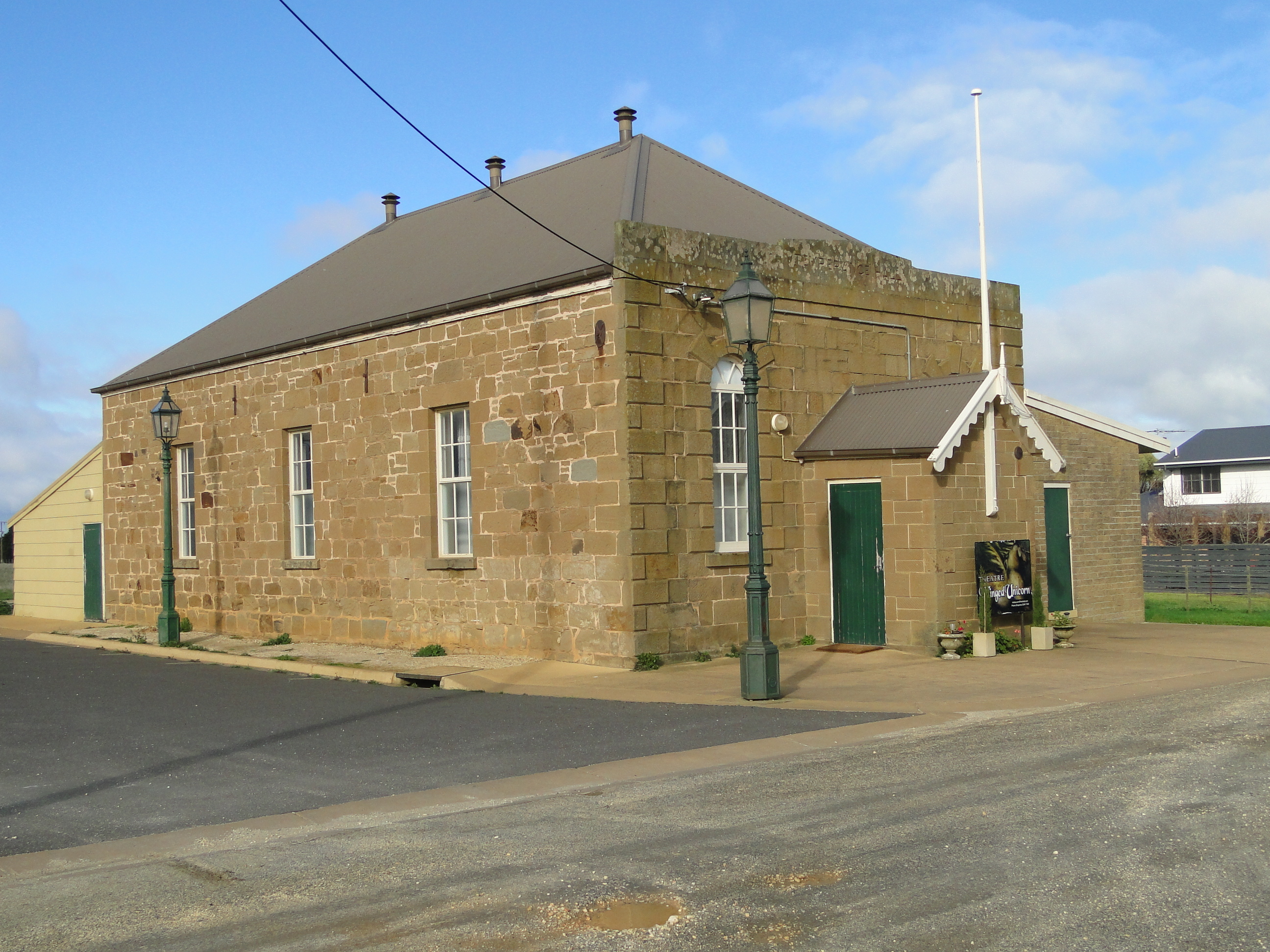
Former Temperance Hall, now Theatre of the Winged Unicorn

== Media ==
Narrowcast dance radio station Kiss FM broadcasts to Ceres via a repeater transmitter on 87.8 FM, on a transmission power of 1-watt.

== 21st century and beyond ==
The town has grown since the beginning of the 21st century, although it remains a country atmosphere, including by keeping old gas lights along its main street (lit with electricity). A number of historical homesteads can be found in the township and surrounding hills. Many are constructed from locally hewn Barrabool sandstone.

Ceres Primary School, dating from 1875, continues to operate, and had 86 students in 2013.

The Uniting Church maintains an active congregation at their church in Wheatsheaf Street, with services held monthly in rotation with their Barrabool and Moriac churches.

The town is home to the Theatre of the Winged Unicorn, a fringe theatre group, which operates out of the former Temperance Hall.

Ceres is also home to the Barrabool Rural Fire Brigade which is located on 15 Wheatsheaf Street, Ceres.

The Barrabool Cricket Club is also based in Ceres fielding four senior men's teams in the Bellarine Peninsula Cricket Association, a senior women's team in the Barwon Women's Cricket Competition and four junior teams in the Geelong Junior Cricket Association.

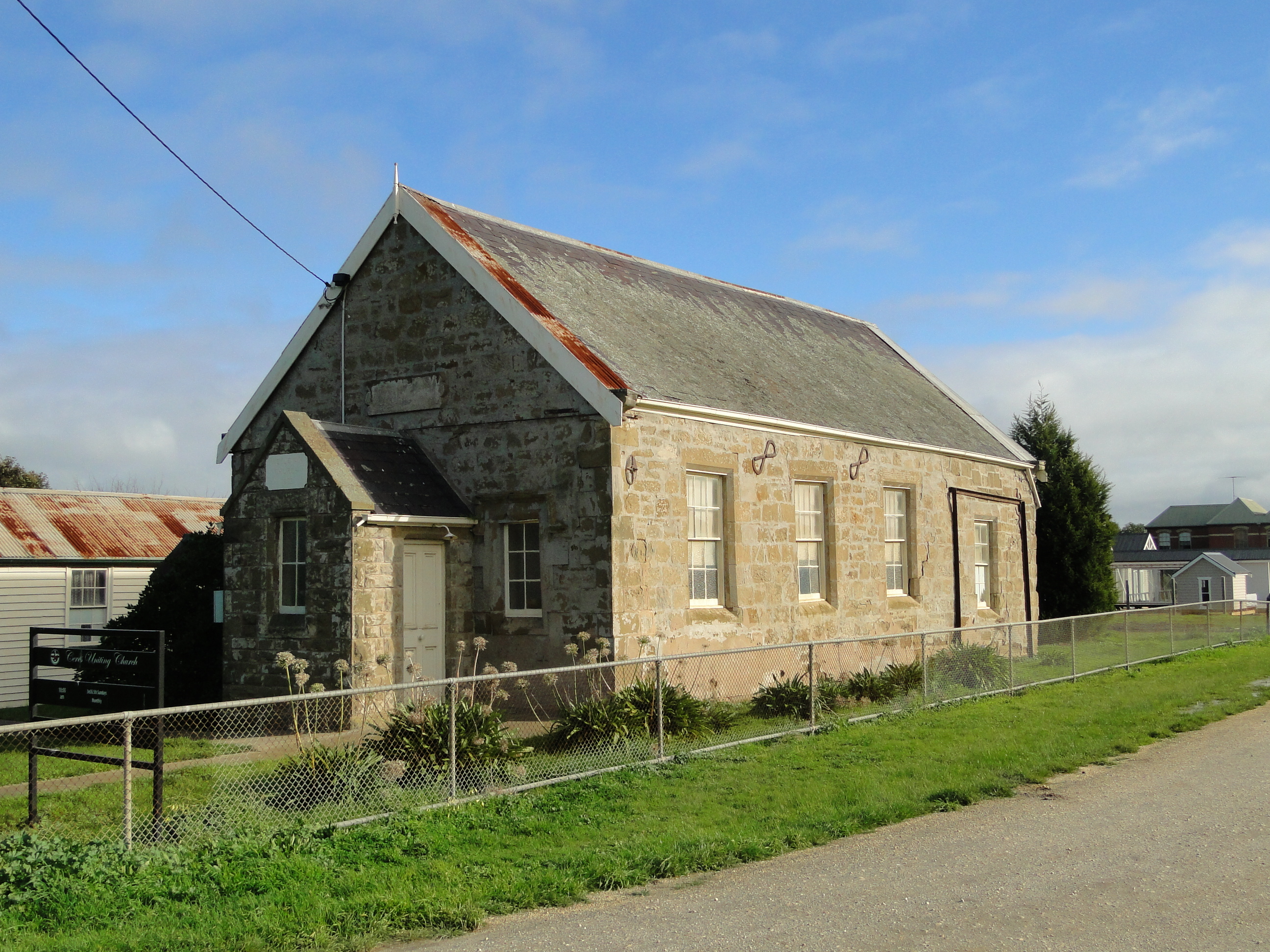
Wesleyan Chapel built 1853

== Notable people ==
Singer and songwriter, local Taylor Henderson, achieved fame after becoming runner-up in the 2013 season of The X Factor Australia.
