= List of places on the Victorian Heritage Register in the Shire of Mornington Peninsula =

This is a list of places on the Victorian Heritage Register in the Shire of Mornington Peninsula in Victoria, Australia. The Victorian Heritage Register is maintained by the Heritage Council of Victoria.

The Victorian Heritage Register, as of 2026, listed the following 45 state-registered places within the Shire of Mornington Peninsula:

Place name	Place #	Location	Suburb or Town	Co-ordinates	Built	State registered	Photo
Athenaeum	H2227	26 Ocean Beach Rd	Sorrento	38°20′20″S 144°44′26″E	1894	9 September 2010	
The Anchorage	H1899	3273 Point Nepean Rd	Sorrento	38°20′24″S 144°44′40″E	1873	9 November 2000	
Barragunda	H0615	113 Cape Schanck Rd	Cape Schanck	38°28′00″S 144°54′15″E	1860	19 February 1986	
Beleura	H0319	1 Tallis Ave	Mornington	38°12′35″S 145°3′14″E	c. 1860	9 October 1974	
Blairgowrie House	H0292	17–23 Scott Wynd	Blairgowrie	38°21′38″S 44°46′11″E	c. 1870s	9 October 1974	
BP Refinery Administration Building (former)	H1016	220–350 The Esplanade	Crib Point	38°20′55″S 145°12′55″E	1965	5 May 1994	
The Briars	H0320	450 Nepean Hwy	Mount Martha	38°16′14″S 145°02′34″E	c. 1840s	9 October 1974	
Camp Manyung	H1895	35 Sunnyside Rd	Mount Eliza	38°12′05″S 145°04′02″E	1920	15 March 2001	
Cape Schanck; Lightstation	H1748	164–240 Cape Schanck Rd	Cape Schanck	38°29′22″S 144°53′07″E	1857	12 November 1998	
The Chalet	H1891	14 Glenisla Dr	Mount Martha	38°16′19″S 145°00′42″E	1890	17 August 2000	
Combe Martin	H1900	819–820 The Esplanade	Mornington	38°12′51″S 145°02′40″E	1939	28 September 2000	
Coolart	H0759	36–40 Lord Somers Rd	Somers	38°23′13″S 145°08′23″E	1897	20 December 1989	
Collins settlement site	H1050	2700–3148 Nepean Point Rd	Sorrento	38°20′59″S 144°45′43″E	1803	17 November 1994	
Commonwealth Aircraft Corporation Hangar (former)	H0094	112 Stuart Rd	Tyabb	38°15′42″S 145°10′43″E	1937	23 November 2006	
Continental Hotel	H1896	1–21 Ocean Beach Rd	Sorrento	38°20′21″S 144°44′29″E	1875	11 October 2000	
Delgany	H2058	Nepean Hwy	Portsea	38°19′21″S 144°42′33″E	1925	11 March 2004	
Dromana Drive-in	H2219	133 Nepean Hwy	Dromana	38°19′47″S 144°59′48″E	1962	23 September 2010	
Duffy's Lime Kiln	H1931	7 Merrylands Ave	Portsea	38°19′28″S 144°44′08″E	1856	14 June 2001	
Eastern Shore Light (former)	H1516	650 Point Nepean Rd	McCrae	38°20′51″S 144°55′43″E	1883	20 August 1982	
Flinders Pier, incorporating the Telegraph Cable Complex and Jetty Cargo Shed (former)	H2413; H0906	The Esplanade / Foreshore	Flinders	38°28′31″S 145°01′31″E	1860; c. 1871	20 October 2022; 25 March 1992	
Fort Franklin (former)	H1090	3704 Point Nepean Rd	Portsea	38°19′05″S 144°43′06″E	1870	27 July 1995	
Fossil Beach Cement Works	H1929	off The Esplanade	Mornington	38°14′30″S 145°01′42″E	1862	14 June 2001	
Grimwade House	H2209	28–54 Dundas St	Rye	38°22′27″S 144°49′01″E	1962	14 May 2009	
Hendra	H1907	11 Willams Rd	Mount Eliza	38°10′28″S 145°05′28″E	1939	21 December 2000	
Heronswood	H0664	105 Latrobe Pde	Dromana	38°20′39″S 144°56′38″E	1871	11 November 1987	
Ilyuka Lime Kiln; Bathing Box	H1191	Port King Rd	Portsea	38°19′29″S 144°44′15″E	1880	23 May 1996	
Japanese Tea House	H2203	675 The Esplanade	Mornington	38°13′57″S 145°01′39″E	1870	6 April 2009	
Koonoona	H0695	51 Merricks Rd	Merricks	38°23′06″S 145°05′11″E	c. 1865	25 October 1989	
Lord Somers Camp	H2292	150 Lord Somers Rd	Somers	38°23′29″S 145°08′45″E	1931	8 September 2011	
Lyncroft	H1909	410 Tucks Rd	Shoreham	38°24′31″S 145°00′56″E	1935	21 December 2000	
Marathon	H0946	12 Marathon Dr	Mount Eliza	38°09′50″S 145°05′53″E	1913	16 December 1992	
McCrae Homestead	H0291	6–8 Charles St	McCrae	38°20′59″S 144°55′53″E	1844	9 October 1974	
McCraith House	H1906	1–3 Attunga Cres	Dromana	38°20′41″S 144°57′33″E	1956	21 December 2000	
Moondah Gatehouse	H1894	60–70 Kunyung Rd	Mount Eliza	38°11′20″S 145°04′38″E	1888	12 October 2000	
Mount Martha House	H1901	468 The Esplanade	Mornington	38°13′28″S 145°01′57″E	1889	12 October 2000	
Norman Lodge	H0321	1125 Nepean Hwy	Mount Eliza	38°11′40″S 145°04′18″E	1863	9 October 1974	
The Pines Foreshore Reserve	H1996	Beach Rd; Cliff Rd	Shoreham	38°26′15″S 145°02′41″E	1903	19 December 2002	
Point Nepean Defence and Quarantine Precinct	H2030	Coleman Road	Portsea	38°18′47″S 144°41′45″E	1852	22 July 2004	
Ramsay House	H2181	29 Rendlesham Ave	Mount Eliza	38°10′40″S 145°04′41″E	1937	9 October 2008	
Ranelagh Estate	H1605	Mt Eliza Way	Mount Eliza	38°11′13″S 145°05′25″E	1924	12 May 2005	
Rosebud Sound Shell	H2299	988 Point Nepean Rd	Rosebud	38°21′21″S 144°54′03″E	1968	8 March 2012	
Sages Cottage	H0302	85 Sages Rd	Baxter	38°11′51″S 145°08′07″E	1870	9 October 1974	
St James the Less; Anglican Church	H1890	105 Koetong Pde	Mount Eliza	38°11′45″S 145°05′21″E	1865	17 August 2000	
The Ship	H1910	35 Rannock Ave	Mount Eliza	38°10′36″S 145°04′59″E	1935	21 October 2000	
Sullivan's Lime Kiln	H1930	335 Browns Rd	Rye	38°23′59″S 144°49′34″E	1855	14 June 2001	
