= Norman Lodge =

Heritage-listed house in Melbourne, Victoria, Australia

- Location of the house in Greater Metropolitan Melbourne
- Interactive map of the Norman Lodge area
- Former names: Manyung

General information
- Status: Completed
- Type: House
- Architectural style: Victorian Rustic Gothic
- Location: 1125 Nepean Highway, Mount Eliza, Mornington Peninsula, Melbourne, Victoria, Australia
- Coordinates: 38°11′40″S 145°04′18″E
- Year built: c. 1860 – c. 1863
- Completed: 1863; 163 years ago
- Client: Richard Grice

Technical details
- Material: Bricks; weatherboard; slate

Design and construction
- Architect: Francis A. Gillett (attrib.)

Victorian Heritage Register
- Official name: Norman Lodge
- Type: Registered place
- Designated: 9 October 1974
- Reference no.: H0321
- Heritage overlay no.: HO151
- Category: Residential buildings (private)

Register of the National Estate
- Official name: Norman Lodge and outbuildings
- Type: Defunct register
- Designated: 21 March 1978
- Reference no.: 5837

Norman Lodge, known as Manyung between 1863 and 1947, is a house located at 1125 Nepean Highway, in Mount Eliza, on the Mornington Peninsula, in the south eastern suburbs of Melbourne, in Victoria, Australia.

Built in 1863 on the traditional lands of the Bunurong people, the house was added to the Victorian Heritage Register on 9 October 1974 in recognition of its historical and architectural significance; and was also added to non-statutory lists by the Victorian branch of the National Trust on 30 August 1973 and the now defunct Register of the National Estate on 21 March 1978.

== History ==
Norman Lodge was constructed in c. 1863 for pastoralist and businessman, Richard Grice, possibly to designs by Francis Gillett, in the Victorian Rustic Gothic style. The house was set on approximately 117 hectares (290 acres), located adjacent to the coast, that was purchased by William Robertson at the first land sales in 1854, and this was subsequently bought by Grice in 1860.

It was here that he established his seaside property, known as Manyung. The house was one of a number of large residences established by Melbourne gentry, especially from the 1860s, on the cliffs between Frankston and Mornington. Grice became a pastoralist in the Colony of Victoria within a few years of his arrival in 1839, and his mercantile house became one of the oldest and foremost in Australia.

Manyung had various owners in the early twentieth century including Thomas Baker, a photographic scientist, who acquired the property in about 1919. Baker was a founder of the Australian branch of the Kodak film company and established the Thomas and Alice Baker Institute of Medical Research. Baker gave 2 hectares (4 acres) to the YMCA in about 1926, and Camp Manyung was established at the southern end of the site.

In 1947 the property was bought by Norman Myer, the chairman and managing director of Myer Emporium Ltd., for the use of his staff for holidays and as a convalescent home. It was at this time that Myer renamed the property as Norman Lodge.

== Description ==
Norman Lodge comprises the Gothic Revival style main house, gatekeeper's cottage, carriage house, men's quarters, chapel (formerly the hall), staff cottage and associated outbuilding, prefabricated weatherboard house, and garden and landscape features; the estate's driveway, garden paths and strolling garden. The house includes a tower with triple-lancet windows and arcaded corbel table and parapet, a battlemented bay window, patterned slate roofing, elaborate coloured glazing, Moorish keyhole arches to the sidelights of the entrance, and an extremely fine timber verandah with pierced quatrefoil decoration.

Norman Lodge is an intact example of one of several bayside estates constructed in the 1860s as summer retreats for Melbourne's businessmen. It is one of the few of these estates which was not substantially subdivided during the mid-twentieth century, when maintenance of these properties became difficult for individual families. It remains largely intact and retains its distinctive carved timber verandah detailing. Norman Lodge is also notable for its collection of outbuildings and ancillary structures, especially the Gothic Revival style gatehouse and prefabricated weatherboard cottage.

The place is also significant for the retention of original garden and landscape elements, which provide both a setting for the heritage buildings and evidence of the original landscape planning. These elements include Monterey Cypress trees which may be contemporary with the construction of the main house, a rare example of a strolling garden, a long driveway connecting the gatekeeper's cottage with the main house and original pedestrian pathways.

== See also ==
- Architecture of Melbourne
- List of places on the Victorian Heritage Register in the Shire of Mornington Peninsula
- Moondah Gatehouse
