= Koonoona =

Koonoona may refer to:

- Koonoona, South Australia, a rural locality in Australia
- Koonoona (house), on the Mornington Peninsula, in Melbourne, Victoria, Australia

== See also ==
- Koonoona Park, in Villawood, Western Sydney, Australia
