= Moondah Gatehouse =

Heritage-listed gatehouse in Melbourne, Victoria, Australia

- Location of the gatehouse in Greater Metropolitan Melbourne

General information
- Status: Completed
- Type: Gatehouse
- Architectural style: Tudor Revival (gatehouse only)
- Location: 60–70 Kunyung Road, Mount Eliza, Mornington Peninsula, Melbourne, Victoria, Australia
- Coordinates: 38°11′20″S 145°04′38″E
- Completed: 1888; 138 years ago
- Cost: £35,000
- Client: James Grice

Technical details
- Material: Red bricks
- Grounds: 8.9 ha (22 acres) (includes mansion and grounds)

Victorian Heritage Register
- Official name: Moondah Gatehouse
- Type: Registered place
- Designated: 12 October 2000
- Reference no.: H1894
- Heritage overlay no.: HO111
- Category: Residential buildings (private)

Register of the National Estate
- Official name: Moondah Gatehouse
- Type: Defunct register
- Designated: 21 March 1978
- Reference no.: 5845

Register of the National Estate
- Official name: Moondah Gatehouse and Mansion
- Type: Defunct register
- Designated: undated
- Reference no.: 14708

The Moondah Gatehouse is a gatehouse for the Moonah mansion, located at 60–70 Kunyung Road in Mount Eliza, on the Mornington Peninsula, in the south eastern suburbs of Melbourne, in Victoria, Australia.

Built from 1888 on the traditional lands of the Bunurong people, the gatehouse was added to the Victorian Heritage Register on 12 October 2000 in recognition of its architectural and historical significance; and was also added to non-statutory lists by the Victorian branch of the National Trust on 31 October 1960 and the now defunct Register of the National Estate on 21 March 1978.

== History ==
The cliffs between Frankston and Mornington were among the earliest favoured spots for Melbourne gentry to establish their summer residences. James Grice bought 102 hectares (251 acres) adjacent to Edward Lintott's Earimil, and built Moondah mansion and the gatehouse in 1888. James' father, Richard, had already built the picturesque Gothic and Tudor Revival mansion at Manyung, now Norman Lodge, located adjacent to the Mondah mansion, in the early 1860s. One of James's brothers was Sir John Grice, a former vice-chancellor of The University of Melbourne.

The building work for James Grice's estate Moondah cost £35,000, money which he later professed to have made as a windfall from investment in trams. The Moondah mansion was executed in an Italian Renaissance Revival style on a site facing the sea. The entrance to the estate was some distance off, out of sight of the mansion.

An impressive entrance, appropriate to a country park estate, was required. During a visit to Sydney, Grice had taken a liking to the picturesque castellated Tudor Revival George Street Gatehouse that was the main entrance to the Governor's Domain at Parramatta Park. The design for this 1885 gatehouse was derived from an English architectural pattern book of 1878 titled The Englishman's House: From a Cottage to a Mansion by Charles James Richardson.

== Description ==
Moondah's gatehouse was copied from the plans of the Parramatta building, and hence deviates from the pattern book version in similar ways. The decoration of the Moondah gatehouse was slightly simplified, with quoining only on the surrounds of openings, and less ornate wrought iron work in the gates. The gatehouse lodge was extended sideways in subsequent years. After passing through the portal, the road passed along a tree lined avenue for a distance before turning towards the mansion, whereupon the vista to Port Phillip Bay opened out.

The gatehouse is built of red brick with rendered quoining, mouldings and medieval decoration. The picturesque Tudor features include the asymmetric plan, battlemented parapets, stair turret, four-centred arches to the coach and pedestrian entrances, and the oriel.

=== Mansion ===
Not included in the heritage curtail is Moonah, designed by William Salway, the expansive 42-room Victorian mansion was built by Grice junior between 1888 and 1890, and is set on 8.9 hectares (22 acres).

The mansion was purchased by Sir Reg Ansett in 1947, and turned it into a hotel, called Manyung, confusingly the name of the adjacent mansion built by Grice senior. In 1957, the mansion was purchased by The University of Melbourne and repurposed as the Mount Eliza Business School, a management college. In September 2016, interests associated with Ryman Healthcare purchased the mansion and grounds for A$37.5 million, and made a development application to repurpose the mansion as a luxury retirement village, with 104 independent units, 27 assisted living suites and a 60-bed aged care centre. The Mornington Peninsula Shire Council have sought to open the property to more parklands, that was rejected by the Victorian Civil and Administrative Tribunal in 2022. In December 2025, Ryman Healthcare sold the mansion to the Jacobsen family, who own adjacent holdings.

== See also ==
- Architecture of Melbourne
- List of places on the Victorian Heritage Register in the Shire of Mornington Peninsula
