= Japanese Tea House, Mornington =

Heritage-listed house in Melbourne, Victoria, Australia

Japanese Tea House
- Location of the garden tea house in Greater Metropolitan Melbourne
- Interactive map of the Japanese Tea House area

General information
- Status: Completed
- Type: Garden tea house
- Location: 675 The Esplanade, Mornington, Mornington Peninsula, Melbourne, Victoria, Australia
- Coordinates: 38°13′57″S 145°01′39″E
- Year built: c. 1870 (tea house only)
- Completed: c.1876; 150 years ago
- Owner: Joseph Harris

Technical details
- Structural system: Prefabricated
- Material: Timber

Victorian Heritage Register
- Official name: Japanese Tea House
- Type: Registered place
- Designated: 6 April 2009
- Reference no.: H2203
- Heritage overlay no.: HO66
- Category: Parks, Gardens and Trees

The Japanese Tea House is a prefabricated garden tea house, located on the property called Marina, at 675 The Esplanade in Mornington, on the Mornington Peninsula, in the south eastern suburbs of Melbourne, in Victoria, Australia.

Installed in c. 1876 on the traditional lands of the Bunurong people, the garden tea house was added to the Victorian Heritage Register on 6 April 2009 in recognition of its historical and architectural significance. Marina and its gardens were also added to a non-statutory list by the Victorian branch of the National Trust on 23 October 2006.

== History ==
=== Joseph Harris and Marina ===
Joseph Harris (1833–1925) was a prominent nurseryman, horticulturalist, and public figure. He was a Mayor of Prahran in 1875, was on Melbourne's Metropolitan Parks and Gardens Committee, was involved in the founding of the Burnley Horticultural Society, and was a Member of the Victorian Legislative Assembly from 1880 until 1904, representing St Kilda and then South Yarra.

Harris created one of the earliest public gardens in Victoria on an 32-hectare (80-acre) site he bought in 1876 at Mount Martha. Harris planted the garden with numerous Mediterranean trees, and was involved in the planting of similar trees in the adjacent Mount Martha Park. Following his death, in 1931 his estate gifted the 32-hectare (80-acre) park to the Boy Scouts Association, and it was officially opened and named as the Joseph Harris Scout Park in 1932.

In 1876, Harris purchased a large waterfront property south of the Mornington township and built a six-roomed 'marine villa' holiday house, later known as Marina. By 1903 he had established an ornamental garden of 5 hectares (12 acres) around the house, embellished with a garden tea house in the Japanese style. Caught up in the crash of the 1890s, Harris became insolvent in 1895, and retired to Marina in 1896, where he died in 1925. The original house, Marina, was destroyed by fire in 1915 and a Federation Arts and Crafts house was built as a replacement in the same year. His daughter Rose inherited the property and remained there until her death in 1957, when the whole property was purchased by the Victorian Housing Commission, and subdivided. The house and immediate garden remained on three lots, bought in 1958 by Phillip and Bette Misken, and inherited by their children in 2003.

=== Tea house ===
Harris was a Commissioner for the 1888 Melbourne Centennial Exhibition (and Chairman of its Gardens Committee). While it has been suggested that the tea house might have been part of the Japanese exhibit at the 1888 Exhibition, no documentary evidence supports this theory. The tea house was most likely to have been imported from Japan by Harris between 1876, when Marina was originally constructed as a holiday residence for Harris and his family, and 1920, when descendants can recall that the tea house existed on the property.

The tea house was an architectural feature within the extensive garden that Harris had established on the property, reflecting the interest in Japanese culture in the West at the time, which was popularised by the introduction of Gilbert and Sullivan's comic opera The Mikado in 1885. In 1910 the Japan–British Exhibition was held in London, influencing garden design in England. Such Japanese influences in Melbourne at the turn of the nineteenth century were further reflected in the installation of a Japanese garden within the Treasury Gardens by William Guilfoyle in 1902, demolished after World War II.

== Description ==
The Japanese Tea House is a small gable-roofed structure typical of late-nineteenth century domestic Japanese construction. The walls are clad in horizontally lapped timber boards with vertical straps, and the roof is clad in timber shingles. Standardized features include sliding latticed window screens and shoji doors, and projecting bays supported on curved brackets. The projecting bays at the gable end of the structure feature their own timber-clad roof. Such Japanese timber buildings were typically unpainted, but the exterior of the Japanese Tea House was painted at a later date.

Internally, the open plan of the structure generally conforms to a four-tatami modular dimension. The floor and walls are lined in unpainted timber, and the exposed roof structure consists of three main roof beams supported on struts, with rafters and battens above. There are traces of Japanese script written on the timber panels at one of the gable ends. While the words have not been fully translated, they appear to indicate a date and perhaps the positioning of the member. No other recognisable markings were found on the structure, but the remnant Japanese script was presumably associated with a system of labelling to facilitate the assembly of such prefabricated structures.

The original fabric of the Japanese Tea House is generally intact, although some typical Japanese finishes such as rice paper on the lattice screens and tatami mat flooring, which may have been part of the original structure, were likely to have been removed at some stage.

Tea houses are simple structures were often used as additions to houses, or as a stand-alone retreat or study in gardens. As such, they do not conform to the genre of Japanese tea house architecture, which applies to buildings specifically designed for practising the tea ceremony - a formal cultural ritual in Japan. The misnomer was probably attached since this particular structure was originally imported for use as an architectural folly within a private garden, reflecting the romanticised concept of Japanese culture in the West at the time.

The Japanese Tea House is a rare and the only known example in Victoria of a Japanese prefabricated building in a garden setting. While such buildings were once widely produced for the Japanese market, they were not so commonly exported overseas. The importation and unusual adaptation of this prefabricated structure for use as a garden tea house reflected the popular interest in Japanese culture from the mid-nineteenth to early-twentieth century. Sentiments towards Japanese culture changed in the years after World War II, consequently any substantial examples of nineteenth century Japanese cultural artefacts rarely remain in Australia.

== See also ==
- Architecture of Melbourne
- Japanese architectural influence on the West
- List of places on the Victorian Heritage Register in the Shire of Mornington Peninsula
