= Beleura =

Heritage-listed house in Melbourne, Victoria, Australia

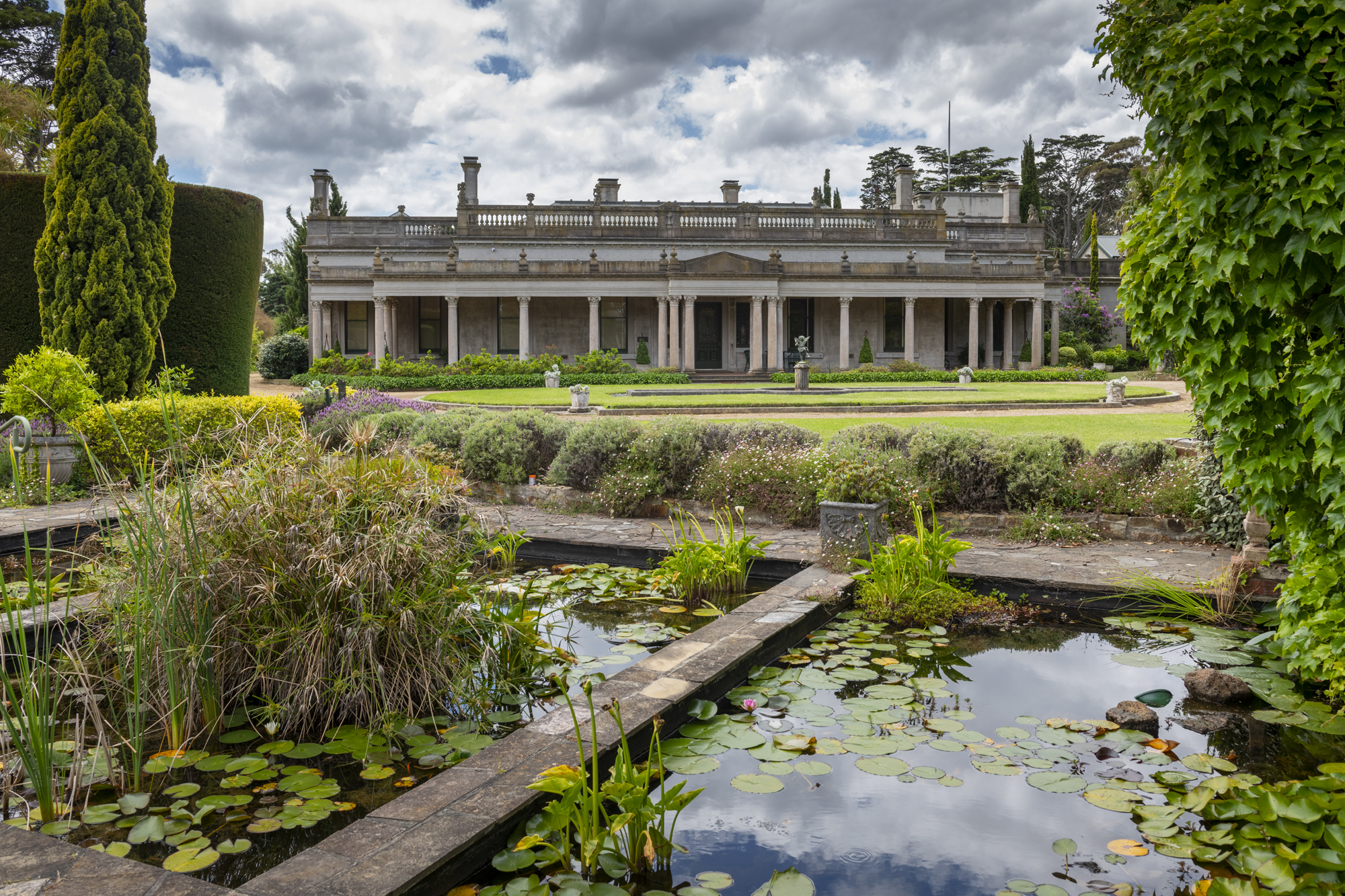
- The house and garden, in 2021

- Location of the house in Greater Metropolitan Melbourne
- Etymology: Mount Leura (deriv.)

General information
- Status: Completed
- Type: Homestead; Historic house museum, garden, and collection (since 2006)
- Architectural style: Victorian Free Classical; Victorian Italianate
- Location: 1 Tallis Avenue, Mornington, Mornington Peninsula, Melbourne, Victoria, Australia
- Coordinates: 38°12′35″S 145°3′14″E
- Year built: c. 1860 – c. 1865
- Completed: c. 1863–c. 1865; 161 years ago
- Client: James Butchart
- Owner: The Tallis Foundation

Technical details
- Material: Granite; bricks; stucco; slate; polyvinyl acetate (art)
- Floor count: 1; with tower
- Grounds: 5 ha (12 acres)

Design and construction
- Architects: Joseph Reed (attrib.); Frederick de Garis (attrib.)
- Architecture firm: Barnes and Reed (attrib.)
- Other designers: Edward La Trobe Bateman (gardens, 1860s); Edna Walling (gardens, 1920s); Harold Desbrowe Annear (pool)

Website
- beleura.org.au

Site notes
- Public access: Tuesday: (half-day tour); Wed & Thursdays: (full-day tour) online bookings essential

Victorian Heritage Register
- Official name: Beleura
- Type: Registered place
- Designated: 9 October 1974
- Reference no.: H0319
- Heritage overlay no.: HO104
- Categories: Parks, Gardens and Trees; Residential buildings (private)

Register of the National Estate
- Official name: Beleura
- Type: Defunct register
- Designated: 21 October 1980
- Reference no.: 5835

Beleura is a stately homestead, gardens, and collection of antiquities that operates as an historic house museum, located at 1 Tallis Avenue, (Note: Also listed as 42–44 Kalimna Drive.) in Mornington, on the Mornington Peninsula, in the south eastern suburbs of Melbourne, in Victoria, Australia.

Located on the traditional lands of the Bunurong people, the house was added to the Victorian Heritage Register on 9 October 1974 in recognition of its historical and architectural significance; and the house and gardens were also added to non-statutory lists by the Victorian branch of the National Trust on 4 May 1998 and the now defunct Register of the National Estate on 21 October 1980.

== History ==
Built by James Butchart between c. 1860 – c. 1865, (Note: Possibly completed in 1863.) set on 73 hectares (180 acres) of a pastoral run, Beleura is one of several stately homes constructed as summer retreats along the Mornington Peninsula between 1860 and 1890 for Victoria's rich and famous. The Mornington Peninsula is the second such precinct in Victoria displaying this social phenomena; preceded by Mount Macedon. Butchart died at Beloura in 1869.

In 1870 the property was purchased by Charles Edward Bright CMG, a Melbourne businessman. In a grand "society wedding" in 1968, Bright married Anna Manners-Sutton, a daughter of Sir John Manners-Sutton, later the 3rd Viscount Canterbury, and the fourth Governor of Victoria from 1866 to 1873. After Manners-Sutton retired, the house was used, for a short time, by his successor as Governor, Sir George Bowen, as his official summer residence and thereafter to B.T.P. Backhouse, who conducted the Mornington Grammar School.

From the late 1880s to 1916 Beleura was owned by a succession of successful businessmen, industrialists, graziers and politicians, including Caleb Joshua Jenner, Robert Smith – the father of Helen Macpherson Schutt (née Smith) – and Mary Williams, the latter who subdivided the property, to enable the establishment of the Beleura Hill estate, from c. 1916.

Theatrical entrepreneur, George Tallis, knighted in 1922, and his wife, Amelia, purchased Beleura and 13 hectares (33 acres) in 1916, as a summer retreat and, on his retirement, developed it as an Ayrshire cattle stud, buying land in the area from c. 1919, and acquired 141 hectares (348 acres) many of the former lots sold by Williams, and 2,428 hectares (6,000 acres) of farmland around Mornington. Sir George was a theatrical entrepreneur who for many years was a co-owner and chairman of the global entertainment company J. C. Willamson Limited which toured plays and musical theatre to Australia, New Zealand, South Africa and London. Sir George and Lady Amelia Tallis continued the traditional use of Beleura as a seaside house and had four children. Lady Tallis died in 1933 and Sir George in 1948. Months before the commencement of World War II in 1939, Tallis allowed the Australian Army to host, at Beleura, a large military camp, with over 2,500 troops; and in 1947, he leased 49 hectares (120 acres) of Beleura for 25 years to enable the establishment of a golf course at Mornington.

Tallis' son, John, a composer, assumed responsibility for the estate in 1949 and during his period of ownership, opened the house and gardens for various artistic and musical events. Following his death in 1996, he bequeathed the house, its collections, and The Tallis Foundation, to the people of Victoria; and they have subsequently been managed as an historic house museum since 2006.

== Description ==
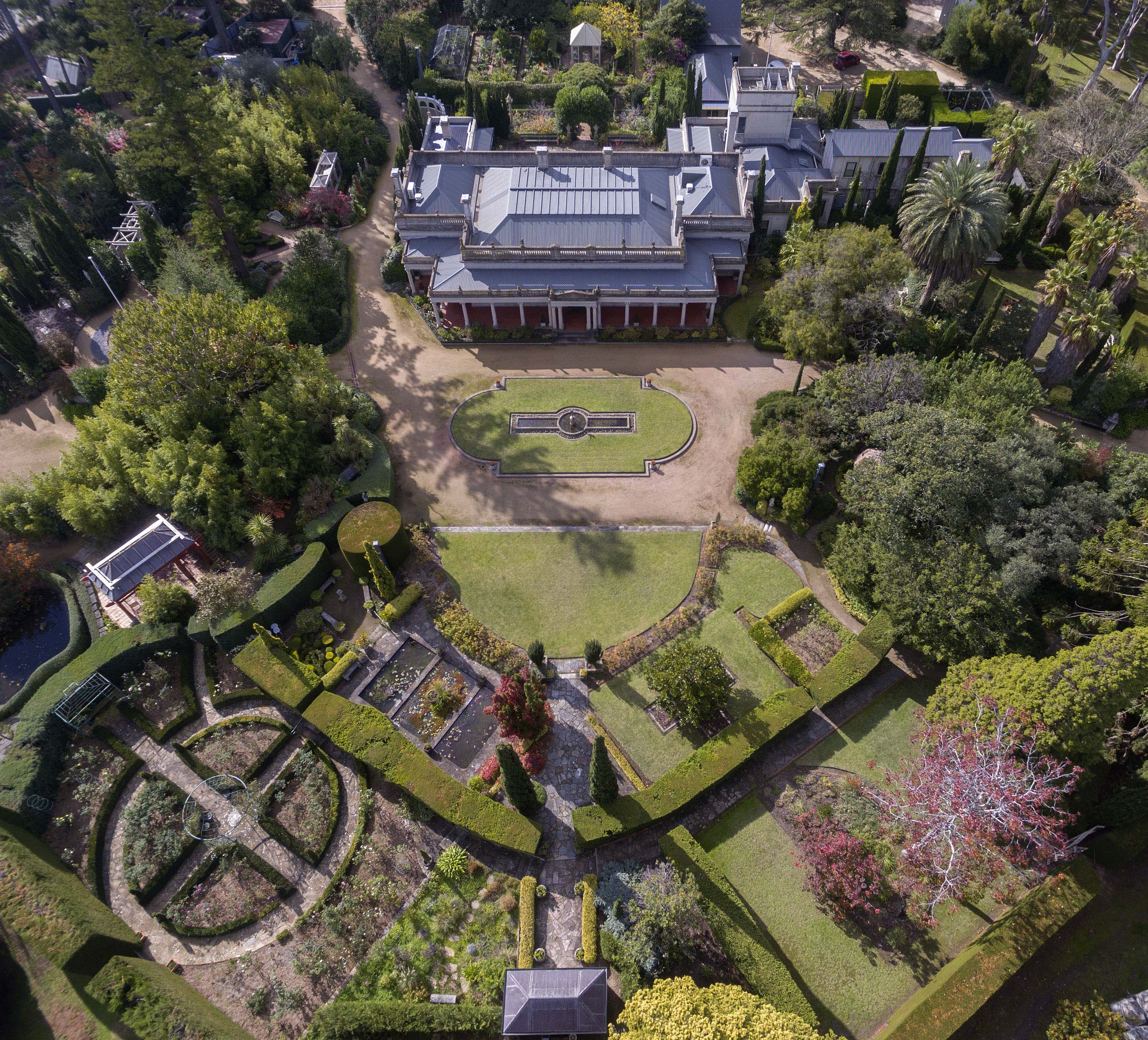
The house and gardens, viewed from above, 2017

The house, gardens and collections operates as a museum and is open to the public, by arrangement.

=== Homestead ===
Constructed in the Victorian Free Classical style, the design of Beleura is attributed (Note: The Victorian Heritage Register stated that the architect was not known.) to either Joseph Reed or Frederick de Garis.

Set in five hectares (twelve acres) of gardens, Beleura is built on a granite foundation with stuccoed brick walls. The main feature of the single-storeyed rectangular house is the Corinthian order colonnade verandah and balustrade parapet; the tower was added at a later date. There are particularly distinctive motifs included on the colonnade with the entablature dwarfed by the balustraded parapet. The house's relationship of side wings is most unusual and significant. Plans of the original house or the site are not known to exist.

John Tallis built on the Victorian Italianate influences of the original design and made a series of changes to the interior and exterior of Beleura. Melbourne artist and student of Norman Lindsay, Wesley Penberthy, produced a series of ceiling paintings, in the entrance hall and drawing and dining rooms, considered to be the first in Australia painted using polyvinyl acetate finish to produce a matt fresco appearance.

=== Gardens ===
Approached by a long driveway through its outer grounds, the garden contains many huge specimen trees and a rear stone courtyard – all original features of this nineteenth century seaside garden. The garden contains features from three main periods including the original nineteenth century driv way layout, rear courtyards and coniferous trees; the early twentieth century addition of a formal pool designed by Harold Desbrowe Annear; and, John Tallis' mid-twentieth century Italian influenced embellishments consisting of a formal rose garden and statues. Later overlays added a grove of Lemon-scented gums, large hedges, reflective pools, and espaliered apple trees surrounding a charming kitchen garden. Edna Walling was engaged by Lady Tallis to assist with re-design of the gardens; with initial designs attributed to Edward La Trobe Bateman.

=== Collections ===
The house remains as it was at the time of John Tallis and contains the artefacts, furnishings and housewares from his family’s interest in collecting European art and many ordinary items used in daily personal life. The collections of approximately 25,000 items include homewares, antique furniture, and paintings chosen by Sir George Tallis, artworks and books chosen by John Tallis remain in situ, many items by ceramicist Klytie Pate, a collection of musical instruments including a Stuart & Sons piano and a rare cello from 1791, with a unique collection of three automobiles, including a Jaguar Mark IV.

== Etymology ==
Beleura is believed to be a derivation from Mount Leura, near Camperdown.

== See also ==
- Architecture of Melbourne
- List of museums in Melbourne
- List of places on the Victorian Heritage Register in the Shire of Mornington Peninsula
