= The Chalet, Mount Martha =

Heritage-listed house in Melbourne, Victoria, Australia

The Chalet
- Location of the house in Greater Metropolitan Melbourne

General information
- Status: Completed
- Type: House / Swiss chalet
- Architectural style: Early Queen Anne
- Location: 14 Glenisla Drive, Mount Martha, Melbourne, Victoria, Australia
- Coordinates: 38°16′19″S 145°00′42″E
- Completed: 1890; 136 years ago

Technical details
- Material: Weatherboard; timber; slate
- Floor count: 2

Design and construction
- Architecture firm: Reed Smart & Tappin

Victorian Heritage Register
- Official name: The Chalet
- Type: Registered place
- Designated: 17 August 2000
- Reference no.: H1891
- Heritage overlay no.: HO88
- Category: Residential buildings (private)

Register of the National Estate
- Official name: The Chalet
- Type: Defunct register
- Designated: undated
- Reference no.: 103234

The Chalet is a house in a Swiss chalet style, located at 14 Glenisla Drive in Mount Martha, on the Mornington Peninsula, in the south eastern suburbs of Melbourne, in Victoria, Australia.

Completed in 1890 and located on the traditional lands of the Bunurong people, the house was added to the Victorian Heritage Register on 17 August 2000 in recognition of its architectural and historical significance; and was also added to the now defunct Register of the National Estate on an unknown date.

== History ==
Mount Martha has its roots dating back to the 1840s when the township's major role was that of farming. The Briars homestead in the town's east was constructed from the 1840s over twenty years and was farmed by Alexander Balcombe until 1877, and then his descendants.

=== Moore's ownership ===
H. Byron Moore, a civil servant and entrepreneur, arrived in colonial Victoria in 1852 and joined the government survey department at Geelong as an apprentice draftsman while the town was being laid out. At the age of 22 he was appointed as district surveyor and assisted in surveying the Geelong to Cape Otway telegraph line. He rose to Assistant Surveyor-General in 1870, aged approximately thirty years; however he was sacked as one of the Black Wednesday dismissals of 1878. Moore set up business as a surveyor and broker and established Melbourne's first stock exchange; and, like many others, began speculating on land during the late 1880s.

By the 1880s the Mornington Peninsula was an increasingly popular site for Melbourne businesspeople to build summer residences. In 1889, Moore, with A. C. Allan, the Tuxen brothers, and others, formed a syndicate called the Mount Martha Company, and carved off 504 hectares (1,245 acres) as a large residential seaside estate from part of Robert Watson's landholding. The scheme was set up to capitalise on this trend by attracting a wider sample of wealthy Melbournians to the area. The estate was designed with sinuous roads following the contours of the hillside, and offered allotments laid out with commanding ocean views unobstructed by neighbours. Moore and his syndicate hoped to yield ₤100,000. However, Moore's plans were ruined by the 1891 economic bust. The Sisters of Loreto purchased much of the estate.

The Chalet was built on a one-hectare (two-acre) allotment, owned by Moore, and built the house as one of its showpieces of the Mount Martha Estate.

In addition to his land speculation activities, Moore founded the Melbourne Electric Light Co. in 1880 and the Melbourne Telephone Exchange which provided the town with a telephone service two years before London. He was also made secretary of the Victorian Racing Club in 1881, and remained so until 1925. During that time he promoted the Melbourne Cup as a national event and supervised the erection of three new grandstands. Moore is also credited with the introduction of the Mount Martha Chalet heath (Erica Baccans) which has since become rampant.

=== Subsequent owners ===
After Moore, The Chalet was owned by the Bank of Victoria who sold it to Mrs Annie Robertson, early in the twentieth century.

Dr Roland Wettenhall owned The Chalet between c. 1924 and 1965, and then his son, Henry Norman Wettenhall of Toorak, from c. 1965 until the 1970s. Dr Roland Wettenhall, a dermatologist, was born on the family station near Stawell. He was educated into the medical profession and aided in his specialisation by his cousin, Herman Lawrence. He saw active duty during World War I and afterwards continued practicing dermatology at The Alfred and later the Melbourne hospitals. He was active in, and a founding member of, a number of professional organisations as well as pursuing an interest in history via the Royal Historical Society of Victoria and the Genealogical Society of Victoria.

The Aberfeldie Trust No. 2 became the owner during the 1970s where the site included the house and tennis courts, that were sold to John and Lorelle Wallace in the late 1980s.

== Description ==
Moore called for tenders in 1890, along with a similar tender for Moore's partner, A. Tuxen. Noted Melbourne architects Reed Smart & Tappin, who more typically designed large commercial buildings and mansions, won the tender. The 1890s depression put an early stop to the Estate as a whole and only a few allotments were sold. However, some of the entries for an architectural competition held for the Estate in 1891 appear to have been influenced by the Chalet design. The winning design of the competition for model houses which followed on the estate resembled the picturesque style chosen. The 1891 competition for other houses was won by Allan C. Walker. Similarly styled houses were reputedly owned by the Hayes family (Seahome) and the Ramsays (Seaview), the latter in Normanby Terrace.

The weatherboard design of The Chalet has similarities in decoration, scale and plan to an 'ornamental villa' in the American pattern book of Samuel Sloan published in the 1850s. It shares some features with early Queen Anne style domestic work. The picturesque effect is created by a combination of prominent stand-alone siting, main entrance facade aligned to views of the water, timber shingled upper walls and elaborate timber gable, eaves and fascia adornment. The square plan is fragmented by decorated bays. Inside, the central masonry core carrying the fire-places takes an hourglass shape rotated at 45 degrees to the main plan, creating an unusual, but well resolved room layout and staircase. This internal core is reflected on the outside by the prominent tower like cluster of six chimneys at the apex of the pyramidal roof. The service areas are concentrated at the rear, behind the kitchen in skillion-roofed attachments. Notable elements include the fragmented form, deep bracketed eaves with the slatted frieze attached, window bays and the half-timbered gables.

Describing the house in The Australasian, a journalist commented:

Mr Byron Moore has built himself a quaint wooden chalet on the Mount Martha Estate. All the chimneys are in the centre of the house, and each room is triangular in form. If the old saying, "The more corners, the more comfort," be true this ought to be the ideal house of comfort in the colony.

— The Australasian, 1893.

The Chalet is of architectural significance for its unusual and accomplished picturesque Swiss chalet design which is complemented by its picturesque siting. There are no known comparable picturesque timber villas among the rest of the architect's works, and few comparable designs in Victoria in general. The style is notable as a departure from the earlier summer residences designs at the Mornington Peninsula that typically had more formal late Victorian-era classical revival designs and which were sited either like city residences, or in the case of larger blocks, like English country houses. The Chalet presaged the many picturesque holiday houses built in the area in the early twentieth century, in what was then a bushland setting. Similar picturesque, often Swiss chalet designs, were used on Mount Macedon in the same era. However, the Chalet and Mount Martha House are the only built remnants of the original Mount Martha Estate of 1889.

There are mature Monterey pines in the remaining grounds, but subdivisions have taken other garden remnants.

== See also ==
- Architecture of Melbourne
- List of places on the Victorian Heritage Register in the Shire of Mornington Peninsula
