= St James the Less Church, Mount Eliza =

Heritage-listed church in Melbourne, Victoria, Australia

St James the Less Church
- Location of the church in Greater Metropolitan Melbourne
- St James the Less Church
- 38°11′45″S 145°05′21″E
- Location: 105 Koetong Parade, Mount Eliza, Mornington Peninsula, Melbourne, Victoria
- Country: Australia
- Denomination: Anglican
- Website: mteliza.melbourneanglican.org.au

History
- Status: Church
- Founded: 1865; 161 years ago
- Dedication: James the Less

Architecture
- Functional status: Occasional services
- Architect: William Grover
- Architectural type: Church
- Style: Primitive Gothic

Specifications
- Materials: Bricks; granite; slate; stained glass

Administration
- Diocese: Melbourne
- Parish: Mount Eliza

Clergy
- Vicar: Rev. Tanya Cummings

Site notes
- Sculptor: Violet Teague (1931)

Victorian Heritage Register
- Official name: St James the Less Anglican Church
- Type: Registered place
- Designated: 17 August 2000
- Reference no.: H1890
- Heritage overlay no.: HO109
- Category: Religion

Register of the National Estate
- Official name: St James the Less Anglican Church
- Type: Defunct register
- Designated: 21 March 1978
- Reference no.: 5839

The St James the Less Church is a heritage-listed Anglican church, located at 105 Koetong Parade, in Mount Eliza, on the Mornington Peninsula, in the south eastern suburbs of Melbourne, in Victoria, Australia.

Built in 1865 on the traditional lands of the Bunurong people, the church was added to the Victorian Heritage Register on 17 August 2000 in recognition of its historical and aesthetic significance; and was also added to non-statutory lists by the Victorian branch of the National Trust on 9 December 1971 and the now defunct Register of the National Estate on an unknown date.

A new church building, called Mount Eliza Anglican Church, was completed in the 2000s and the historical church building is used for limited occasional worship.

== Description ==
The land occupied by the church was donated by Edward Linott, an early settler in the area. Prior to construction of the church, services were held in a wooden schoolhouse.

The foundation stone for the small brick church was laid on 15 October 1865. The church was constructed using locally-made bricks on a granite base and was designed by William Grover. The three bay church has a gabled slate roof and a porch. Round-headed window and door openings and an oculus distinguish the design, as do the gable roofs and buttresses to a lesser degree. The building combines Gothic massing with round headed windows in a Primitive Gothic style. The chancel and vestry were added in 1913, are brick on brick foundations. The brickwork of the church has been over painted.

=== Altarpiece ===
The five-panel altarpiece called the Adoration of Angels, of Shepherds, of Kings was painted in 1931 by the artist Violet Teague. The painting, in oils on canvas panels, was designed to fit into the apse of the church. It is a rare example of an altarpiece in situ and is one of only five altarpieces executed by Teague known to survive in Victoria and one of only two of her altarpiece paintings that remain in situ. It is also her largest and most ambitious religious work. The painting was designed to accommodate openings for a door and a window, and is significant for its unusual representation of the subject matter, an allegorical painting of The Nativity and the scale of the work.

=== Pipe organ ===
A single-manual pipe organ of seven stops built in 1873 by George Fincham for Christ Church Anglican Church, Echuca and was the earliest known pipe organ in northern Victoria. It was moved to St Anselm's Anglican Church, Middle Park in 1922, installed in St Silas' Anglican Church, Albert Park in 2001 and moved to its present location in 2005 by Laurie Pipe Organs. The instrument is significant as one of its builder's earliest instruments to survive intact, and for its attractive Gothic casework incorporating spotted metal façade pipes. The instrument has an unusual crenellated cedar case, incorporating four flats of spotted metal pipes placed within Gothic arches, thought to be unique amongst Fincham's surviving work. It remains largely unaltered from the original, retaining its pipework, action and console. The case is also one of the last made by Fincham where all of the façade pipes are completely enclosed by woodwork. Mechanically, the provision of a second and higher reservoir indicates a rare concern for wind stability in an era of hand blowing.

== See also ==
- Architecture of Melbourne
- List of Anglican churches in Melbourne
- List of places on the Victorian Heritage Register in the Shire of Mornington Peninsula
