= Fossil Beach Cement Works =

Archaeological site in Australia

- Location of the former factory and archaeological site in Greater Metropolitan Melbourne
- Interactive map of the Fossil Beach Cement Works area

General information
- Status: Completed
- Type: Factory; cement works; archaeological site
- Location: Mornington, Mornington Peninsula, Melbourne, Victoria, Australia
- Coordinates: 38°14′30″S 145°01′42″E
- Completed: 1862; 164 years ago
- Closed: 1863 (production ceased)
- Destroyed: 1879 (sealed)
- Client: Patent Septaria Cement Co.

Design and construction
- Architect: James M. Robertson

Victorian Heritage Register
- Official name: Fossil Beach Cement Works
- Type: Registered place
- Designated: 14 June 2001
- Reference no.: H1929
- Heritage overlay no.: HO83
- Category: Manufacturing and Processing

Register of the National Estate
- Official name: Patent Septaria Cement Works and Fossil Site Complex
- Type: Defunct register
- Designated: undated
- Reference no.: 100470

The Fossil Beach Cement Works is a former manufacturing plant for cement and archaeological site, located adjacent to The Esplanade in Mornington, on the Mornington Peninsula, in the south eastern suburbs of Melbourne, in Victoria, Australia.

Located on the traditional lands of the Bunurong people, the former plant operated for just one year. Subsequently developed as an archaeological site, the structures and grounds were added to the Victorian Heritage Register on 14 June 2001 in recognition of its archaeological and historical significance; and was also added to non-statutory lists by the Victorian branch of the National Trust on 16 August 1973 and the now defunct Register of the National Estate on an unknown date.

== History ==
=== Cement factory ===
In October 1861, an architect, James M. Robertson, applied for a patent to manufacture cement from septarian nodules. The cement works at Fossil Beach were constructed in 1862 and the company traded as the Patent Septaria Cement Co. This was the first attempt to manufacture Roman (hydraulic) cement in Victoria.

Robertson placed public notices in The Argus in January 1862, warning that action would be taken against any party removing septaria from the coast of Mornington, or south of Geelong, without authorisation. In April of that year he called for a series of tenders for various projects including the supply and installation of a 7–9-kilowatt (10–12 hp) steam engine, the erection of a kiln and tanks, the erection of a jetty and sheds, and the supply of firewood. A loading jetty, built on granite piers, gave access to boats to transport the cement to Melbourne.

The company appeared to have been operating successfully by August 1862 and a report appeared in The Argus in September of that year advised that supplies of cement were placed on the market. Shortly after The Age noted that 'The cement has proved itself of excellent quality, is now being used in the erection of the Bank of Victoria, Collins Street and it is expected to supersede importations from England. This is a satisfactory practical development of a new industry.' However, this was proven to be misplaced optimism, as by October 1963, proceedings commenced to liquidate the company. The supply of septaria was limited and the process, involving two kiln operations and mechanical grinding, was expensive.

=== Archaeological site ===
From 1864 Fossil Beach was a destination for excursions by naturalists, geologists and holiday makers, spurred by valuable fossil deposits in the area. In 1879 the Mornington Shire cemented over the lesser kiln for the picnic area.

Encouraging tourism from Melbourne to the Mornington Peninsula, in 1907, The Australasian reported:

To those who have a taste for geological study the sea cliffs just beyond Mornington are especially interesting because they contain perhaps the finest fossil deposits to be found in Victoria. For that reason, as well as the wildlife of its coastline, it is generally selected by the school-teachers of Victoria as the scene of their annual camp for the purpose of nature study.

— The Australasian, 19 October 1907

And again, promoting tourism, in 1916:

Aware of its tourist potential in September 1916, a few enthusiasts formed a working bee to clear and widen the old track from the coast road to Marina Cove, opposite Joseph Harris’ house. They were so impressed with the fine view across Port Phillip Bay that a seat was erected at the end of a walkway through tea-tree. And three seats and a table were put at Fossil Beach after pedestrian and vehicular tracks were improved there as well.

An access road was established in 1927.

From 1967 to 1969, the cement works were subject to thorough archaeological excavation by William Culican and John Taylor – believed to be the first historical archaeological excavation undertaken in Victoria. The results of that excavation, together with a comprehensive history of the site were published in 1972. They established that no industrial activity was undertaken after 1863-4, confirming that the physical remains relate to the cement works run by Robertson.

== Description ==
Located approximately 2.8 kilometres (1.7 mi) south-south-west of Mornington, the remnants of the cement works comprise parts of two stone kilns, built into the hillside, since depleted and filled in with earth subsidence and overgrowth, the larger one having fire bricks from the Christie Wallyford Brickworks, Scotland. There is also the remains of a retaining wall, a working platform and cart track to the top of the kiln, a washing table, and a 3.5-to-5.7-metre (11 to 19 ft) diameter wash mill with connected settling pans. There are also remains of ground tanks, a small well, a boiler housing, and numerous channels. The site contains a Hoffman kiln red brick fireplace that was built in 1941.

The site demonstrates technical innovation, and predates the establishment of successful Portland Cement manufacturing in Victoria by nearly thirty years. The site contains ruined remains of a rare industrial building type. The site is also of historical significance as evidence of the nineteenth century denudation of the Peninsula landscape. In the 1830s she-oaks and banksias dominated the landscape of the area. However these trees proved highly suitable as lime burning fuel, as she-oaks in particular were a reliable, high-burning fuel. Denudation of these trees was followed by the growth of the characteristic scrubby undergrowth and tea-trees evident on the Mornington Peninsula.

== See also ==
- List of places on the Victorian Heritage Register in the Shire of Mornington Peninsula
