= Blairgowrie House =

Heritage-listed house in Melbourne, Victoria, Australia

- Location of the house in Greater Metropolitan Melbourne

General information
- Status: Completed
- Type: House / Villa
- Architectural style: Victorian Classical Revival; Victorian Italianate
- Location: 17–23 Scott Wynd, Blairgowrie, Mornington Peninsula, Melbourne, Victoria, Australia
- Coordinates: 38°21′38″S 144°46′11″E
- Completed: 1872; 154 years ago
- Renovated: 1972
- Client: Michael O'Grady
- Owner: National Trust of Australia (Victoria) (since 1961)

Technical details
- Material: Limestone; slate; timber; bricks
- Floor count: 1 plus tower
- Grounds: 51 ha (127 acres) (in 1887)

Victorian Heritage Register
- Official name: Blairgowrie House
- Type: Registered place
- Designated: 9 October 1974
- Reference no.: H0292
- Heritage overlay no.: HO229
- Category: Residential buildings (private)

Register of the National Estate
- Official name: Blairgowrie House
- Type: Defunct register
- Designated: 21 March 1978
- Reference no.: 5795

Blairgowrie House is a villa located at 17–23 Scott Wynd in Blairgowrie, on the Mornington Peninsula, in the south eastern suburbs of Melbourne, in Victoria, Australia.

Completed in c. 1870s on the traditional lands of the Bunurong people, the house was added to the Victorian Heritage Register on 9 October 1974; and was also added to non-statutory lists by the Victorian branch of the National Trust on 25 September 1969 and the now defunct Register of the National Estate on 21 March 1978.

The house has been owned by the Victorian branch of the National Trust since 1961.

== History ==
The first title holder of the land, as per the local rate book of 1864, was Robert Byrne, an Irish-born auctioneer and estate agent, and, from 1866, a politician who represented Crowlands in the Victorian Legislative Assembly. In 1868, Byrne transferred the land to Charles Gavan Duffy, an Irish nationalist and Victorian politician. Duffy was an important figure in the development of the area, who in 1871 went on to be the eighth Premier of Victoria. In 1872, Duffy transferred the title to his friend, Irish-born Michael O'Grady, a businessman, Roman Catholic community leader, and politician who served as Mayor of Hawthorn and as a Member of the Legislative Assembly. O'Grady also had a town house in Hawthorn. It appears that Blairgowrie House was built for O'Grady from 1872.

From 1876, Alexander Blair, (Note: Also cited as William Allison Blair.) and his wife, Margaret (née Paris) and family became owners. (Note: It is most likely that the house was named "Blairgowrie" by the Blair family; and may have previously been called simply "Gowrie".) Blair was born in Scotland in 1821 and migrated to Australia in 1857. (Note: Also cited as 1853.) A master mariner, Blair was involved in lime companies and was relatively successful before losing most of his assets in the bank crash of the 1890s. His son, Dr John Blair, was a physician, also born in Scotland, the secretary for ten years and then the president of the Medical Society of Victoria in 1872, and a leading proponent of the establishment of the The Alfred Hospital and, several years later, the Austin Hospital for Incurables. John Blair was noted as the owner of Blairgowrie House from 1876, comprising approximately 51 hectares (127 acres) until it passed to his widow, Mary Hunter Blair, on his death in 1887.

There were many subsequent owners of the property and, in 1923, the eight-roomed homestead and 214 allotments, subdivided off the original site, were listed for sale. In June 1961, Blairgowrie House was sold for $40,000 to the Victorian branch of the National Trust. The house was restored in 1972 and leased as a private residence. The interior was modernised.

== Description ==
A local landmark, Blairgowrie House is a single-storey villa with tower, built from 1872 on an elevated site in a combination of the Victorian Classical Revival and Victorian Italianate styles. The house is asymmetrically arranged with a gabled wing to each face. Construction is of random coursed limestone with a slate roof, timber verandah, and rendered chimneys, eaves, string courses and window sills. The eaves brackets, gable, and tower details are distinctive. The house is unusually designed with four main facades to suit the elevated site. The details of the gables, the brackets, timber finials and vents are notable Italian in origin. The tower is a distinctive feature, the acroteria and paired corner brackets, The weathervane and string courses are notable.

The interior was modernised since c. 1972.

== See also ==
- Architecture of Melbourne
- List of places on the Victorian Heritage Register in the Shire of Mornington Peninsula
