= Mount Martha House =

Heritage-listed former hotel, now community centre, in Melbourne, Victoria, Australia

- Location of the former hotel in Greater Metropolitan Melbourne
- Former names: Mount Martha Hotel
- Alternative names: Mount Martha House Community Centre

General information
- Status: Completed
- Type: Hotel; guest house; barracks (1890–1978); Community centre (since 1979)
- Architectural style: Federation Queen Anne
- Location: 468 The Esplanade, Mornington, Mornington Peninsula, Melbourne, Victoria, Australia
- Coordinates: 38°13′28″S 145°01′57″E
- Named for: Mount Martha Estate
- Year built: 1889–1890
- Completed: 1890; 136 years ago
- Renovated: 1979
- Client: Mount Martha Estate Company
- Owner: Shire of Mornington Peninsula (since 1979)

Technical details
- Material: Timber; weatherboard; glass

Design and construction
- Architecture firm: Tappin, Gilbert and Dennehy

Website
- mountmarthahouse.com.au

Victorian Heritage Register
- Official name: Mount Martha House
- Type: Registered place
- Designated: 12 October 2000
- Reference no.: H1901
- Heritage overlay no.: HO
- Categories: Transient Accommodation; Recreation and Entertainment

Register of the National Estate
- Official name: Mount Martha Hotel (former)
- Type: Defunct register
- Designated: undated
- Reference no.: 103194

The Mount Martha House, formerly the Mount Martha Hotel, is a former hotel, guest house, and army barracks, and, since the 1970s, a community centre, located at 468 The Esplanade, in Mornington, on the Mornington Peninsula, in the south eastern suburbs of Melbourne, in Victoria, Australia. Located on the traditional lands of the Bunurong people, the first structures on the site commenced in 1889. Despite its name, Mount Martha House is neither a house, nor is it located in the adjacent suburb of Mount Martha; its official name is the Mount Martha House Community Centre.

The community centre was added to the Victorian Heritage Register on 12 October 2000 in recognition of its architectural and historical significance, and, on unknown dates, was also added to non-statutory lists by the Victorian branch of the National Trust and the now defunct Register of the National Estate.

== History ==
=== Hotel and guest house ===
Between 1889 and 1890, the Mount Martha Estate Company erected the Mount Martha Hotel on a two-hectare (five-acre) site as temporary accommodation to promote summer residences for the wealthy on the Mornington Peninsula. It operated as a hotel, coffee palace, and guest house from the 1890s to 1950 to support the residential development of the Mount Martha Estate. While elements of the planning of the Estate can be discerned in the street pattern and street names, Mount Martha House and The Chalet (the residence of Byron Moore, one of the developers) are the only built remnants of the scheme. It was shown in the estate brochures, set to the north of Watson's villa (Melrose) and at the north-western tip of an extensive bayside residential subdivision which went as far as Bay Road on the north, the Nepean Highway on the east, and Park Road on the south.

Managers

The hotel was operated in 1893 by either Miss Johanna Buckley or Miss Rebecca Buckley. As listed in the Victorian Post Office Directory of the early 1890s, the Misses Buckley were variously attributed to manage both the Main Point Hotel in South Melbourne and a boarding house at Bairnsdale. Prior to c. 1900, William Detmould was listed as the licensee and Sir Malcolm McEachern as the owner, according to rate books. Madame Elsie Etzenberger, (Note: Also spelled as "Epsenberger".) who lived in Granite Cottage, also once owned and ran the Mount Martha Hotel after Detmould. Etzenberger was previously in charge of Gracedale House, Healesville. When World War I broke out her German/Austrian heritage may have inspired her to shift house.

Mrs Annie Ferrero operated the hotel after WWI, where she was assisted in her later years, from the 1920s, by William Birdling from New Zealand, when the hotel ran as a guest house. During this time, the guest house served as a focal point for travellers, a place where the coach stopped and the telegraph was connected.

=== Military use ===
During World War II, in 1939, huts were erected at the Balcombe Army Camp, located in Mount Martha. The Footscray Regiment of the Australian Army, machine gunners lived in the first houses while the militia lived in tents. Subsequently, the 1st Division of the US Marine Corps and the ‘SeaBees’ Construction Brigades then moved into Army Camp, with estimates of up to 30,000 US military personnel transiting through the site, initially as a training facility and then later, as a rehabilitation centre.

The guest house was requisitioned by the Australian Army for use as accommodation for servicemen, and is one of the few remnants that both the Second Australian Imperial Force and the United States armed forces occupied Mount Martha during the war. Additionally, the Army provided accommodation for the wives of Australian servicemen at 'Grandview', a Mount Martha guest house. In 1942, the house was used as an officer training facility for the Australian Women's Army Service. (Note: There is one claim that the house was "…once used as a camp for boys of missing soldiers and POWs…" However, this statement is not substantiated elsewhere.)

After the war, in 1951, the Australian Army purchased the Mount Martha Guest House and adjacent 2 hectares (5 acres) and the former hotel was used as barracks for the No. 30 Women's Royal Australian Army Corps (WRAAC), until 1978.

=== Community centre ===
The Shire of Mornington purchased the building in 1978 and invited community groups to express interest for repurpose. The proposal from the Mount Martha Bowls Club proposed a lawn bowls club, involving the building of a club house and new rinks, built on the garden next to two tennis courts, the removal of garages and storage sheds, and the construction of a carpark. The Shire however found a better site for the club in Watson Road and the club was content with access to the meeting rooms at Mount Martha House prior to the erection of their clubhouse. Other interested groups included the Red Cross, the junior football club, Rotary Club, the homing club, tennis club, cricketers, and the Anglican church as a service centre. Many others applied.

The plaque commemorating the opening of the centre in July 1979 stated:

'...This building was erected in 1901 (sic) as a hotel/guest house. During the period 1939-1976 it was used as an army establishment (WRAAC Barrack) and was purchased by the Mornington Shire in 1978.'

The community centre houses an historical collection of documents and artefacts from its varied historical use.

== Description ==
Located on a prominent landmark site on The Esplanade, the Mount Martha House is a large single-storey timber building, completed in a picturesque Federation Queen Anne style. The hotel was designed by well-known Melbourne architects, Tappin, Gilbert and Dennehy; Tappin being one of the directors of the Mount Martha Estate Company, at the time, a relatively remote resort, taking approximately a day or longer to travel from Melbourne. The gables and ornamental fretted detailing suggest the type of Swiss chalet architecture also seen at retreats like Mount Macedon. It also resembled the prize-winning designs for houses on the Mount Martha estate illustrated in building journals of the 1890s. Unlike contemporary summer hotels such as the picturesque Braemar House, on Mount Macedon, the Mount Martha House was part of an ambitious and large residential estate which was to be unmatched in concept in a Victorian seaside estate until Griffin's Ranelagh, sold in c. 1924.

Set on an E-plan, the weatherboarded building has two projecting wings, reputedly to house noisy activities like billiards, and a central gabled entry porch attached to the front verandah. Brick, squat chimneys have grouped shafts, in the Elizabethan manner, while the timber gable details resemble European Medieval domestic precedents. The window openings have been altered; otherwise only minor details have changed to the exterior, as viewed from The Esplanade.

A the time of its construction, the Mount Martha House was set in a bushland location, and garden planting contained exotic trees including Golden cypress, Monterey pines, and others. As a consequence, the house parallels other timber hotels in mountain resorts such as at Mount Macedon and Healesville, and is considered an innovatory model seaside estate.

Designed in an organic layout by Allan & Tuxen Bros., the estate layout was distinctive and reminiscent of the later Ranelagh estate, Mount Eliza. The Mount Martha Hotel is shown in a photograph at the north end of part of the Esplanade, captioned 'Esplanade Drive. Two Miles Long...' which then appeared to halt at Bay Road. Sales brochures of the time described the house as:

"The Mount Martha House was a 'commodious structure in the cottage style rectangular in shape and enclosing a large open square and giving accommodation for nearly 100 guests' and a guest house more than a hotel, its cottage design well-suited to the rural landscape of Mount Martha."

The building had several features to commend it, including a design that ensured light and shade in every room, and which projected 'noisy rooms ', such as the drawing room, kitchen and billiards room, at right angles to the main house so that guests would not be disturbed. When built, the house provided playrooms for children, including a covered asphalt space. The parlours of the hotel were 'fitted up in cool and dainty muslins and natural woods, and broken into charming nooks and corners by Moresque arches and pillars'.

The two large wells reputedly at the rear have since been filled in (or overgrown) being in the yard of a house built c. 1955. The spring to the south has since dried up but was once a good source despite the location of the Mount Martha House men's toilets nearly on its banks. As with the Mornington Royal Hotel, a windmill was erected near the beach opposite the former store site and near the carpark, to supplement the water supply to Mount Martha House during the Ferrero occupation. The water was found to be too brackish, as depicted in the estate brochure published in 1891.

== See also ==
- Architecture of Melbourne
- List of places on the Victorian Heritage Register in the Shire of Mornington Peninsula
- The Briars
- The Chalet
