= Blairgowrie, Victoria =

Blairgowrie
- Town
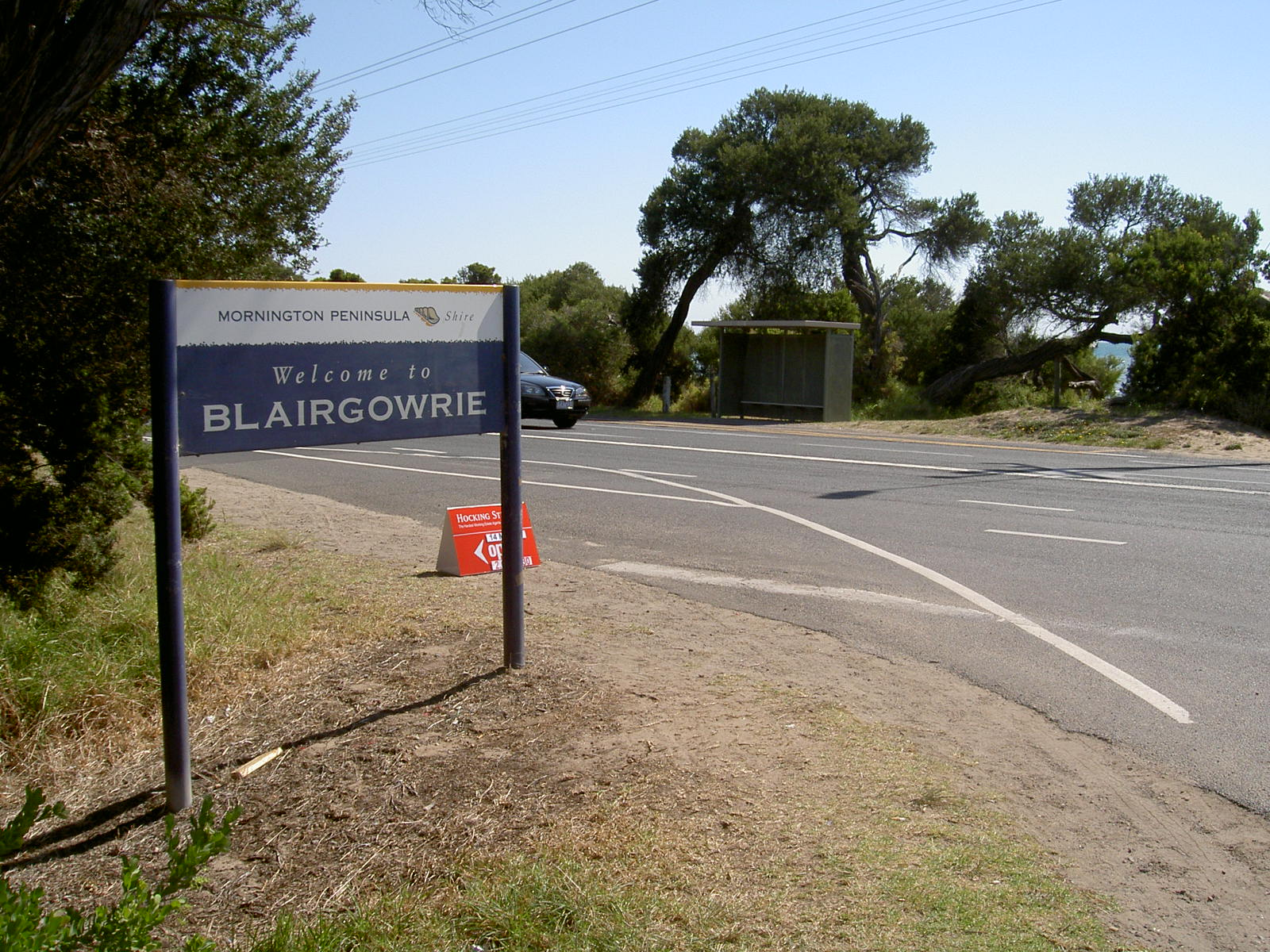
- Blairgowrie welcome sign

- Interactive map of Blairgowrie
- Coordinates: 38.36°S 144.769°E
- Country: Australia
- State: Victoria
- City: Melbourne
- LGA: Shire of Mornington Peninsula
- Location: 87 km (54 mi) from Melbourne; 13 km (8.1 mi) from Rosebud

Government
  - State electorate: Nepean
  - Federal division: Flinders

Area
  - Total: 6.3 km^{2} (2.4 sq mi)

Population
  - Total: 2,786 (2021 census)
  - Density: 442/km^{2} (1,145/sq mi)
- Postcode: 3942
Localities around Blairgowrie
Sorrento		Port Phillip
	Blairgowrie	Rye
	Bass Strait

Blairgowrie is a seaside suburb on the Mornington Peninsula in Melbourne, Victoria, Australia, approximately 63 km (39 mi) south of Melbourne's central business district, located within the Shire of Mornington Peninsula local government area. Blairgowrie recorded a population of 2,786 at the 2021 census.

== History ==
Blairgowrie was named after the Burgh of Blairgowrie, the largest town in Perth and Kinross, Scotland. A post office was not opened until 1 November 1947.

Rhys Isaac, Pulitzer Prize-winning historian, died in Blairgowrie in October 2010.

=== Heritage listings ===
The following place in Blairgowrie is listed on the Victorian Heritage Register:

- Blairgowrie House, 17–23 Scott Wynd, owned by the Victorian branch of the National Trust

== Present day ==
Blairgowrie is located near the western tip of the Mornington Peninsula, between Sorrento and Rye, and is one of many popular holiday destinations for Melburnians along this narrow peninsula strip. It is bordered on the north by Port Phillip, and on the south by Bass Strait and a series of surf beaches interspersed with spectacular cliffs and rocky ledges. It is frequented by tourists in the summer months, and has been featured on numerous travel programs.

Blairgowrie Pier is the most popular shore dive site for recreational scuba diving inside Port Phillip. It was built as a safe boat harbour and marina by the Blairgowrie Yacht Squadron. Blairgowrie Pier is highly regarded for the more than a hundred different species of nudibranch that have been identified there. Each year from May through July thousands of spider crabs migrate along the ocean floor to the cool, shallow waters around Blairgowrie Pier. When the water temperature drops, the spider crabs moult their shells. While their new shells harden, they crowd together for protection from predators like stingrays, seals and sharks, sometimes forming stacks more than a metre high. There are also octopus, cuttlefish, seahorses, box fish, large stingrays, decorator crabs, stargazers, invertebrate, goat fish, blennies, and much colour underwater at Blairgowrie Pier.

== See also ==
- Shire of Flinders – Blairgowrie was previously within this former local government area.
