= Merricks =

- Town
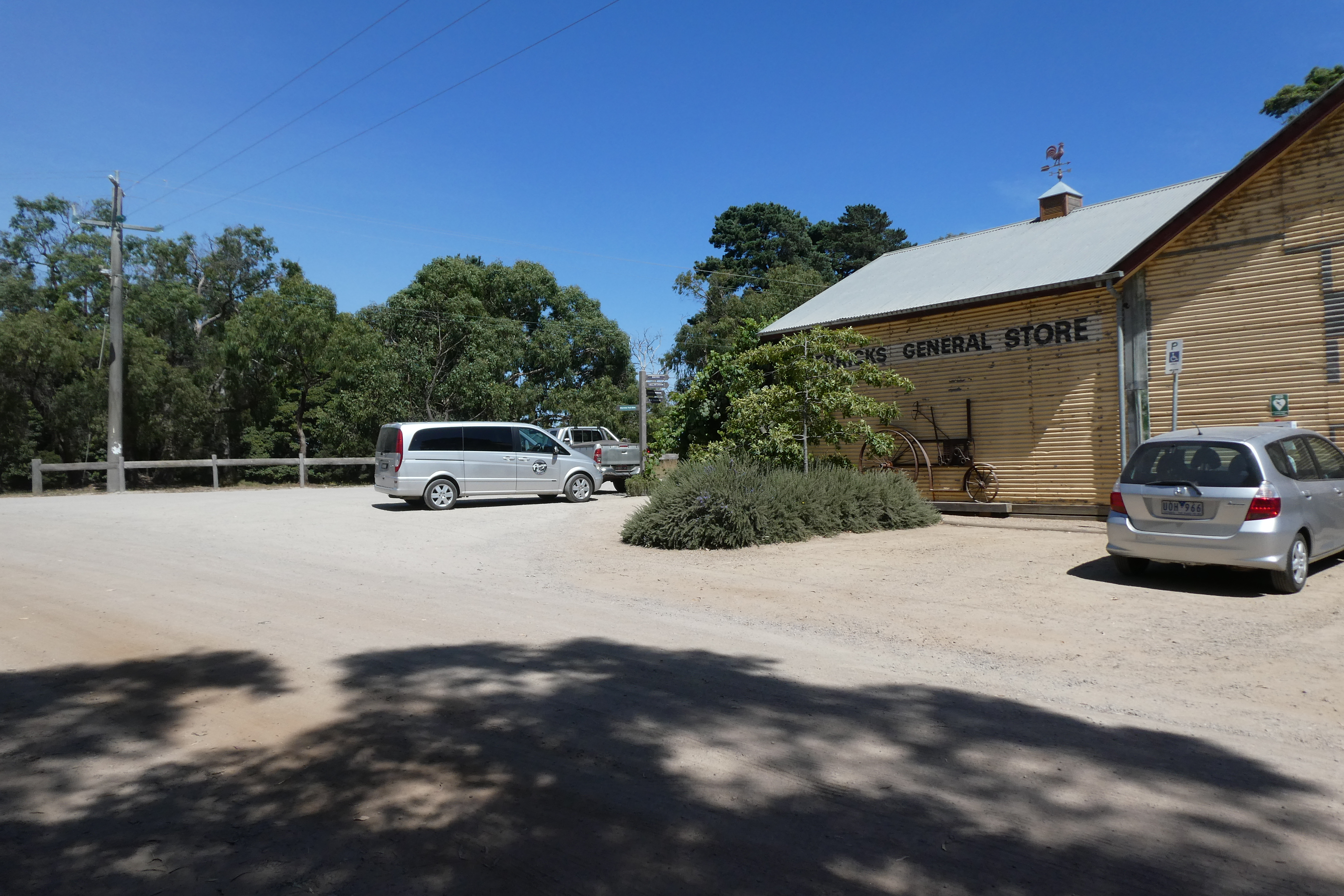
- Merricks General Store

- Coordinates: 38.390°S 145.089°E
- Country: Australia
- State: Victoria
- LGA: Shire of Mornington Peninsula
- Location: 71 km (44 mi) from Melbourne; 17 km (11 mi) from Hastings
- Established: 1860s

Government
  - State electorate: Nepean
  - Federal division: Flinders

Population
  - Total: 184 (2021 census)
- Postcode: 3916

Merricks is a town in the south-eastern extremity of the Mornington Peninsula in Melbourne, Victoria, Australia, approximately 65 km (40 mi) south-east of Melbourne's Central Business District, located within the Shire of Mornington Peninsula local government area. Merricks recorded a population of 184 at the 2021 census.

Merricks is located between Hastings and Flinders.

== History ==
Merricks was part of the Parish of Balnarring and is believed to be named after an early cattle station owner. It was first settled in 1865 by John Caldwell, who built Koonoona, a wattle cottage. Unlike Balnarring and Hastings, Merricks's early settlers preferred running cattle and sheep to growing orchards. In 1902 a post office opened which was served by Cobb and Co from Crib Point; this closed in 1979. In 1920, a co-operative cool store was built in nearby Red Hill, and from 1921 until 1953, a railway from Bittern to Red Hill travelled through Merricks, although it received little use after its initial decade of service. A small primary school was also opened in 1921, closing in 1951 along with several others in the region when Red Hill Consolidated School commenced.

The Victorian Municipal Directory in 1962 stated that Merricks contained "(only) a general store and post and telegraph office".

=== Heritage listing ===
The following place in Merricks is listed on the Victorian Heritage Register:

- Koonoona, 51 Merricks Road

== Present day ==
Merricks is a tiny settlement along the Frankston-Flinders Road which has changed little over the years from its earlier rural functions, and many of the original settler houses still stand today. It features a newly restored General Store (built in 1927) incorporating a post office and newsagency, the Peninsula Quarter Horse Association's base and a chocolate factory. Also in Merricks are the Merricks Creek vineyard specialising in pinot noir production and Stoniers Winery (1978) producing chardonnay and pinot noir.

A 6.3 km mostly tree-lined horse riding trail, established by the former Shire of Hastings in the mid-1980s along a disused railway route, runs roughly east–west from Merricks Station Ground Reserve to Red Hill through mostly rural land between the Coolart and East Creeks.

Merricks is served by the 782 bus route operated by Ventura Bus Lines between Frankston and Flinders.

== See also ==
- Shire of Hastings – Merricks was previously within this former local government area.
