= Koonoona (house) =

Heritage-listed house in Melbourne, Victoria, Australia

- Location of the house in Greater Metropolitan Melbourne
- Interactive map of the Koonoona area

General information
- Status: Completed
- Type: Cottage
- Architectural style: Old Colonial
- Location: 51 Merricks Road, Merricks, Mornington Peninsula, Melbourne, Victoria, Australia
- Coordinates: 38°23′06″S 145°05′11″E
- Year built: 1865–
- Completed: c.1865; 161 years ago
- Client: John Caldwell

Technical details
- Structural system: Pole frame
- Material: Timber; wattle; galvanised iron

Victorian Heritage Register
- Official name: Koonoona
- Type: Registered place
- Designated: 25 October 1989
- Reference no.: H0695
- Heritage overlay no.: HO137
- Category: Residential buildings (private)

Register of the National Estate
- Official name: Koonoona
- Type: Defunct register
- Designated: 30 June 1992
- Reference no.: 17249

Koonoona is a cottage located at 51 Merricks Road in Merricks, (Note: Sometimes described as located in Merricks North.) on the Mornington Peninsula, in the south eastern suburbs of Melbourne, in Victoria, Australia.

Built from c. 1865 on the traditional lands of the Bunurong people, the cottage was added to the Victorian Heritage Register on 25 October 1989 in recognition of its architectural and historical significance; and was also added to non-statutory lists by the Victorian branch of the National Trust on 9 November 1990 and the now defunct Register of the National Estate on 30 June 1992.

== History ==
Very large pastoral runs were established on the Mornington Peninsula that date from the early part of the nineteenth century, including Tuerong, Coolart, Manton's Creek, Arthur's Seat and Tichingorouke.

Koonoona's grounds once formed part of the Tuerong pastoral run of 486 hectares (1,200 acres), owned from c. 1840 by William Thomas, an early colonial settler, and the assistant Protector and Guardian of Aborigines. Thomas was responsible for the Central Protectorate District Westernport regions that included the Wurundjeri (Yarra) and Boon wurrung (coastal Port Phillip and Westernport) peoples.

John Caldwell, a selector, acquired a lease to several Crown allotments of Thomas' pastoral run from c. 1865, or earlier. Caldwell secured freehold title to the land in 1875. The four central rooms of Koonoona, being the earliest part of the cottage, are thought to date from the late 1860s, attributed to John Caldwell.; built in an Old Colonial, pre-Victorian style.

In c. 1905, Koonoona, comprising 91 hectares (225 acres), was purchased by Mr V. Hellicar, who farmed the property with crops and sheep.

Koonoona is of great historical importance, illustrating the lifestyle of early settlers in colonial Victoria. There is perhaps no other vernacular structure of comparable age in Victoria which remains today so well preserved. Koonoora is recognised as a building of considerable importance by experts in the history of Victoria's early vernacular structures such as Dr Miles Lewis, architectural historian.

== Description ==
The four central rooms display interesting building techniques; comprising a pole frame faced both inside and outside with close-set horizontal saplings of Melaleuca ericafolia, packed with pug. The roofing of the older part of the structure is mostly of exceptionally intact Morewood and Rogers' galvanized iron tiles. There are also some Walker's "Gospel Oak" brand tiles, not previously reported in Australia. Other early features noted are the tongue and groove flooring boards and ceilings, and James Carpenter patented door latches.There is no vernacular structure of comparable age elsewhere in Victoria which is in such a good state of preservation.

The adjacent skillion roofed milking shed is also of note for the surviving head bails and feed bins. The three stall shed's frame is made of poles, the roof and some walls are clad with iron tiles, while the other walls and partitions are clad with corrugated iron. Of interest too are the surviving garden elements.

== See also ==
- Architecture of Melbourne
- List of places on the Victorian Heritage Register in the Shire of Mornington Peninsula
