= Mount Martha, Victoria =

Mount Martha
- Suburb
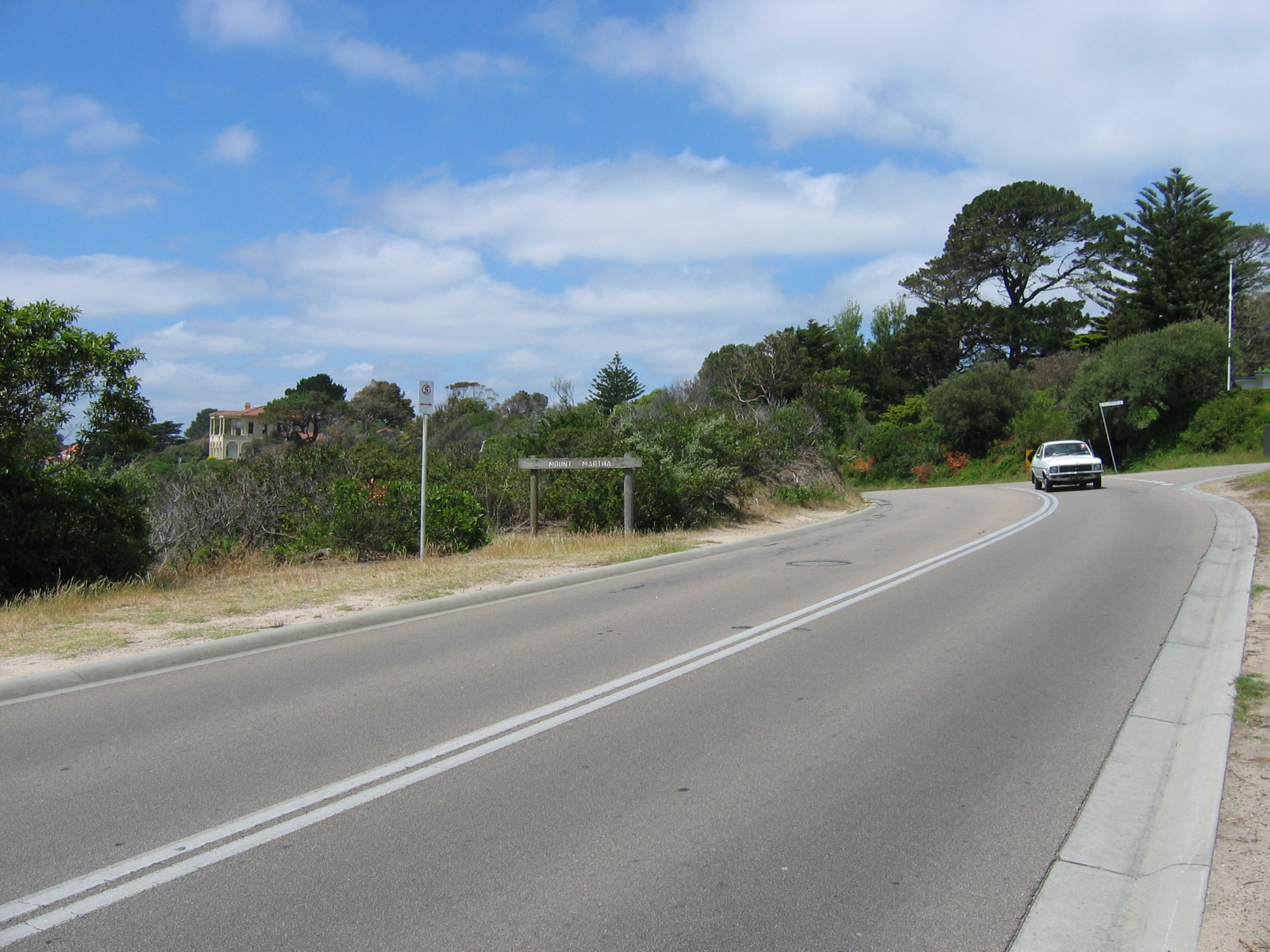
- Esplanade road into Mount Martha

- Interactive map of Mount Martha
- Coordinates: 38.267°S 145.018°E
- Country: Australia
- State: Victoria
- City: Melbourne
- LGA: Shire of Mornington Peninsula
- Location: 50 km (31 mi) from Melbourne; 18 km (11 mi) from Frankston

Government
  - State electorates: Mornington; Nepean
  - Federal division: Flinders

Area
  - Total: 17.2 km^{2} (6.6 sq mi)

Population
  - Total: 19,846 (2021 census)
  - Density: 1,154/km^{2} (2,988/sq mi)
- Postcode: 3934
Suburbs around Mount Martha
Port Phillip	Mornington	Moorooduc
Port Phillip	Mount Martha	Tuerong
Port Phillip	Safety Beach	Dromana

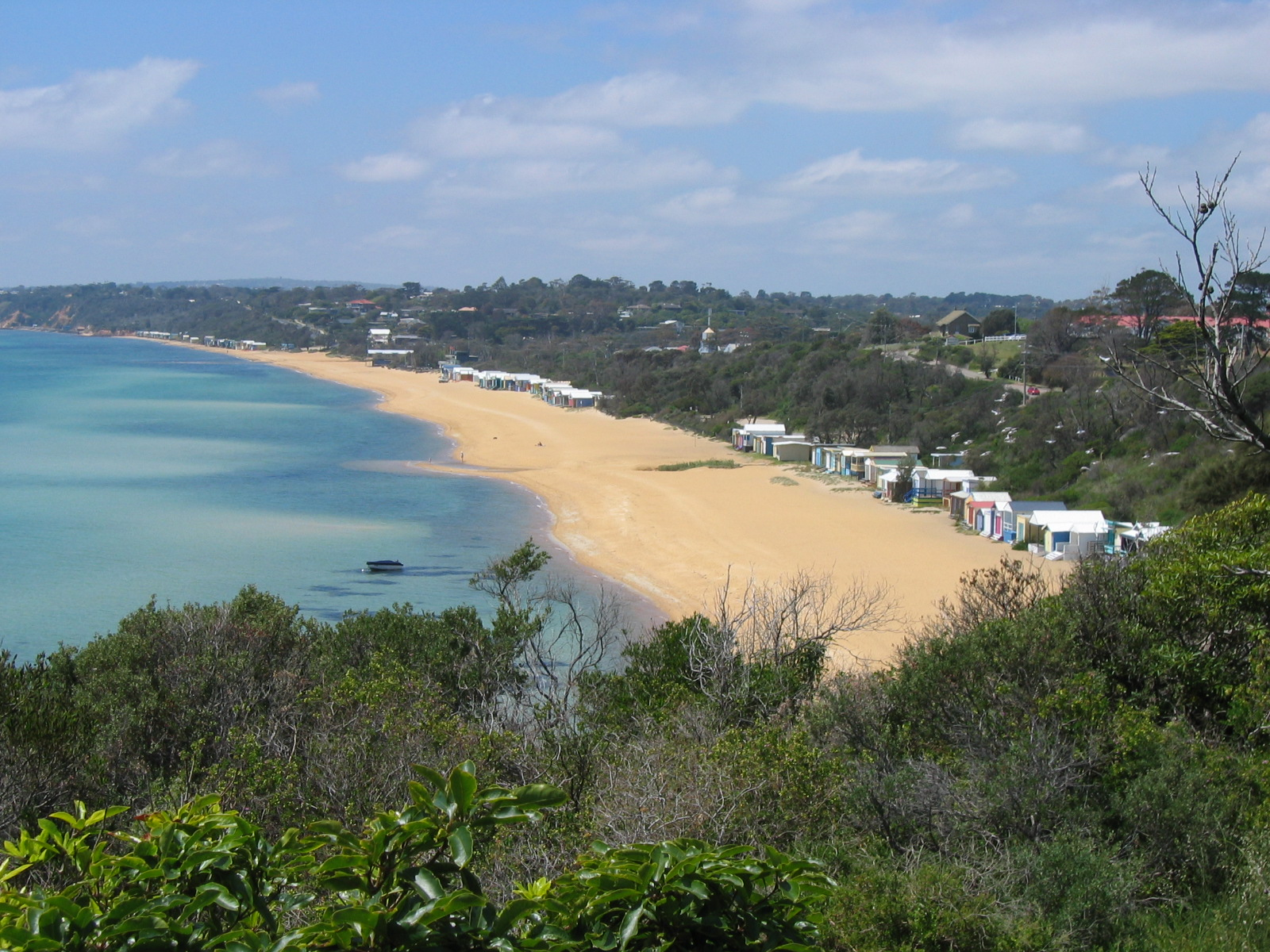
Mount Martha Beach

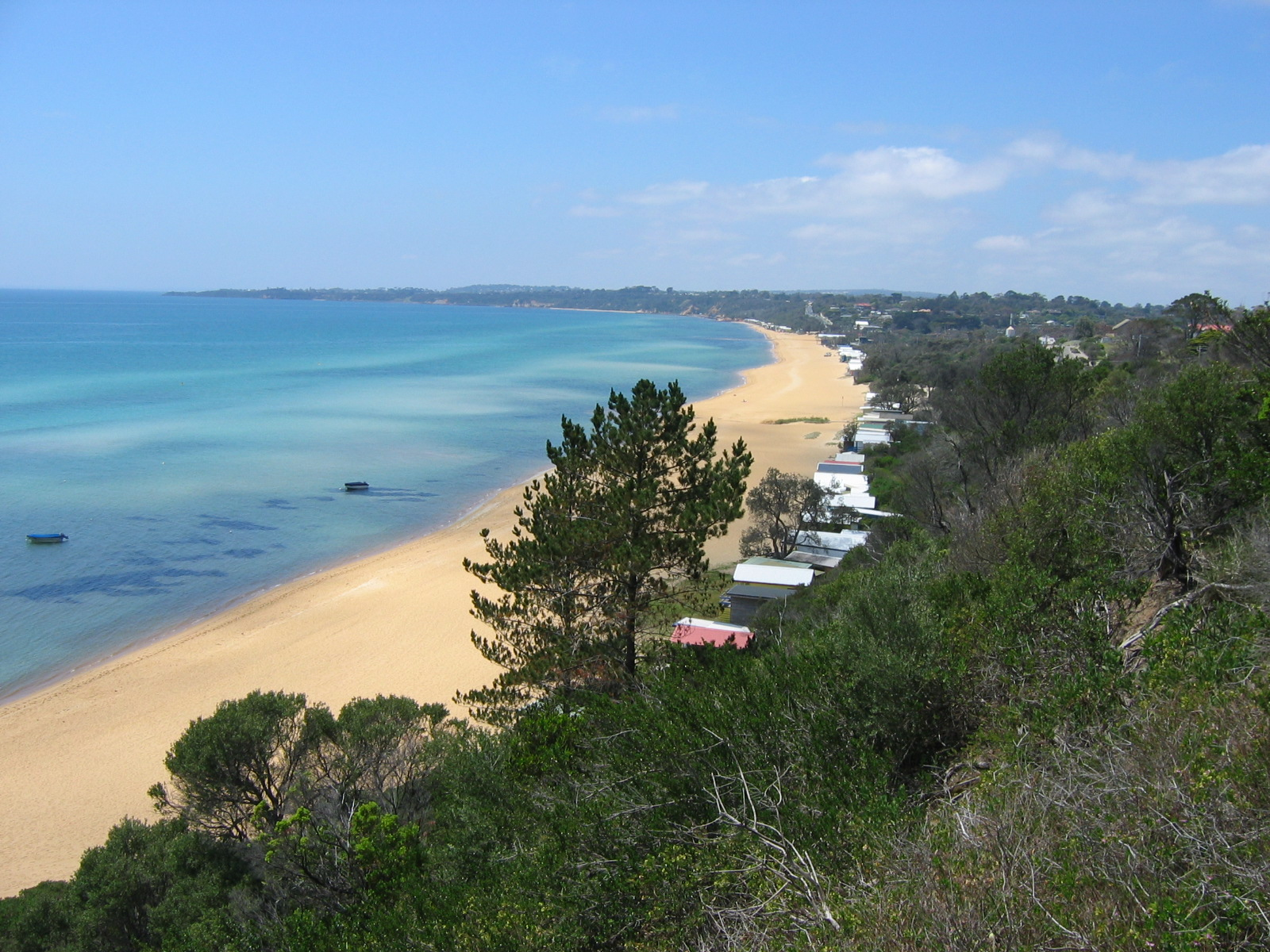
Mount Martha Beach

Mount Martha is a suburb on the Mornington Peninsula in Melbourne, Victoria, Australia, 50 kilometres (31 mi) south-east of Melbourne's Central Business District, located within the Shire of Mornington Peninsula local government area. Mount Martha recorded a population of 19,846 at the 2021 census.

Mount Martha is located on the southeastern shores of Port Phillip and offers a bathing beach. A boardwalk winds its way for more than 5 kilometres (3 mi) along the Balcombe Creek, its North beach mouth to the Briars Historic Park. The suburb's highest point bears the area's name and reaches 160 metres (520 ft). The peak was named in 1836 after Captain William Hobson's mother, Martha Jones.

It marks the start of the Selwyn fault, a geological formation that runs to the eastern Dandenong Ranges.

== History ==
Mount Martha has its roots dating back to the 1840s when the township's major role was that of farming. The Briars homestead in the town's east was constructed from the 1840s over twenty years and was farmed by Alexander Balcombe until 1877, and then his descendants, grazing both cattle and sheep and tended to 40 hectares (100 acres) of vineyards. The homestead was named after the lodging of the same name in Saint Helena. Dame Mabel Brookes collected Napoleonic memorabilia which was also donated to the Mornington Peninsula shire; some is on display at the house. In 1976, the remaining eight hectares (twenty acres) on the former farm, comprising the homestead and gardens, was gifted jointly to the Shire and the Victorian branch of the National Trust.

As the population grew, the Mount Martha Post Office opened around 1902.

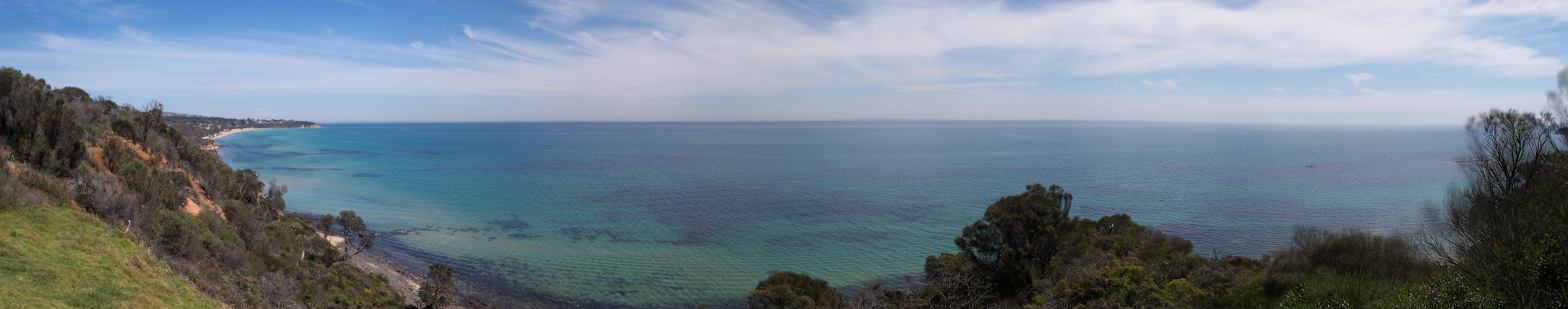
Looking south towards Mount Martha beach

During the Second World War, Mount Martha's Balcombe Creek camp hosted the United States Marine Corps's 1st Marine Division in late 1942 following their involvement in the Battle of Guadalcanal. After the conclusion of the war, it was progressively relocated or demolished until 1999. The area is now known as Balcombe Estuary and has barbecue facilities (including an open fireplace) as well as a children's play area in the west, and residential allocations were made in the east.

In 1978, a water treatment plant was constructed in the town's east. It services the nearby suburbs of Mornington, Mount Eliza, Mount Martha, Somerville, Pearcedale and Baxter, and provides treated water to local vineyards, a tree plantation and lawns.

=== Heritage listings ===
The following places in Mount Martha are listed on the Victorian Heritage Register:

- The Briars homestead, 450 Nepean Highway (8 hectares (20 acres) only)
- The Chalet, 14 Glenisla Drive
- Mount Martha House, 468 The Esplanade

== Present day ==
More recently from the 1990s to the present the Mount Martha area has experienced significant population growth, particularly in the south with the Martha Cove marina development as well as east towards the Moorooduc Highway. This has led to the area being incredibly crowded in Summer, with little or no areas to park.

Mount Martha is home to a volunteer CFA fire brigade responding on average to 180 calls a year for assistance from the community. Incidents range from grass and scrub fires and motor vehicle accidents to house fires.

Martha Cove, a large inland harbour and residential development in Safety Beach, was named after its location in the cove at the foot of Mount Martha. The project, which began in 2004, was initially heavily protested by residents. After experiencing considerable financial difficulties, Martha Cove recovered and became a thriving residential community.

== Transport ==
Peninsula Link and the Mornington Peninsula Freeway are both major arterial routes to both Mount Martha and the Mornington Peninsula, from Melbourne (via the EastLink tollway).

== Sport ==
Mount Martha volunteer Surf Lifesaving Club holds the popular annual Mount Martha Australia Day Swim, the "MMAD Swim". Golfers play at the course of the Mount Martha Golf Club on Forest Drive. Mount Martha is also home to public tennis courts, four football ovals and numerous grass reserves. Mount Martha Soccer Club was established in 2014 and remains a popular community club

Mornington Peninsula Pony Club provides dressage, show jumping and cross-country facilities for young equestrian enthusiasts. The club is affiliated with the Pony Club Association of Victoria.

== Notable people ==
- George Calombaris
- Drew Morphett
- Tones and I
- Mary Sophia Alston
- Tom De Koning

== See also ==
- Shire of Mornington – Mount Martha was previously within this former local government area.
