= Mornington, Victoria =

Mornington
- Suburb
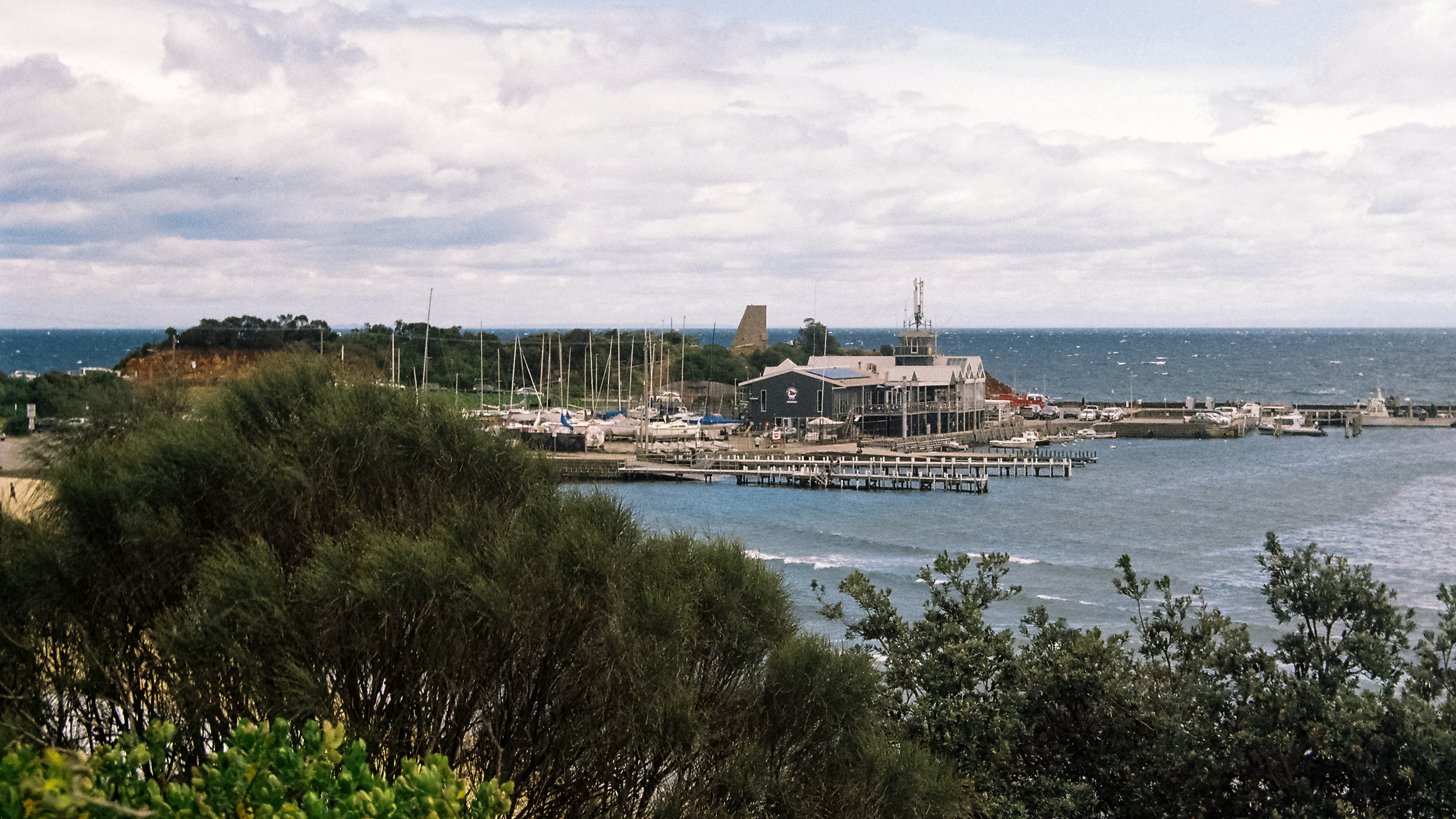
- Mornington 2024

- Interactive map of Mornington
- Coordinates: 38.228°S 145.062°E
- Country: Australia
- State: Victoria
- City: Melbourne
- LGA: Shire of Mornington Peninsula
- Location: 46 km (29 mi) from Melbourne; 13 km (8.1 mi) from Frankston
- Established: 1850

Government
  - State electorate: Mornington
  - Federal division: Flinders

Area
  - Total: 13.5 km^{2} (5.2 sq mi)

Population
  - Total: 25,759 (2021 census)
  - Density: 1,908/km^{2} (4,942/sq mi)
- Postcode: 3931
Suburbs around Mornington
	Mount Eliza	Baxter
Port Phillip	Mornington	Moorooduc
	Mount Martha

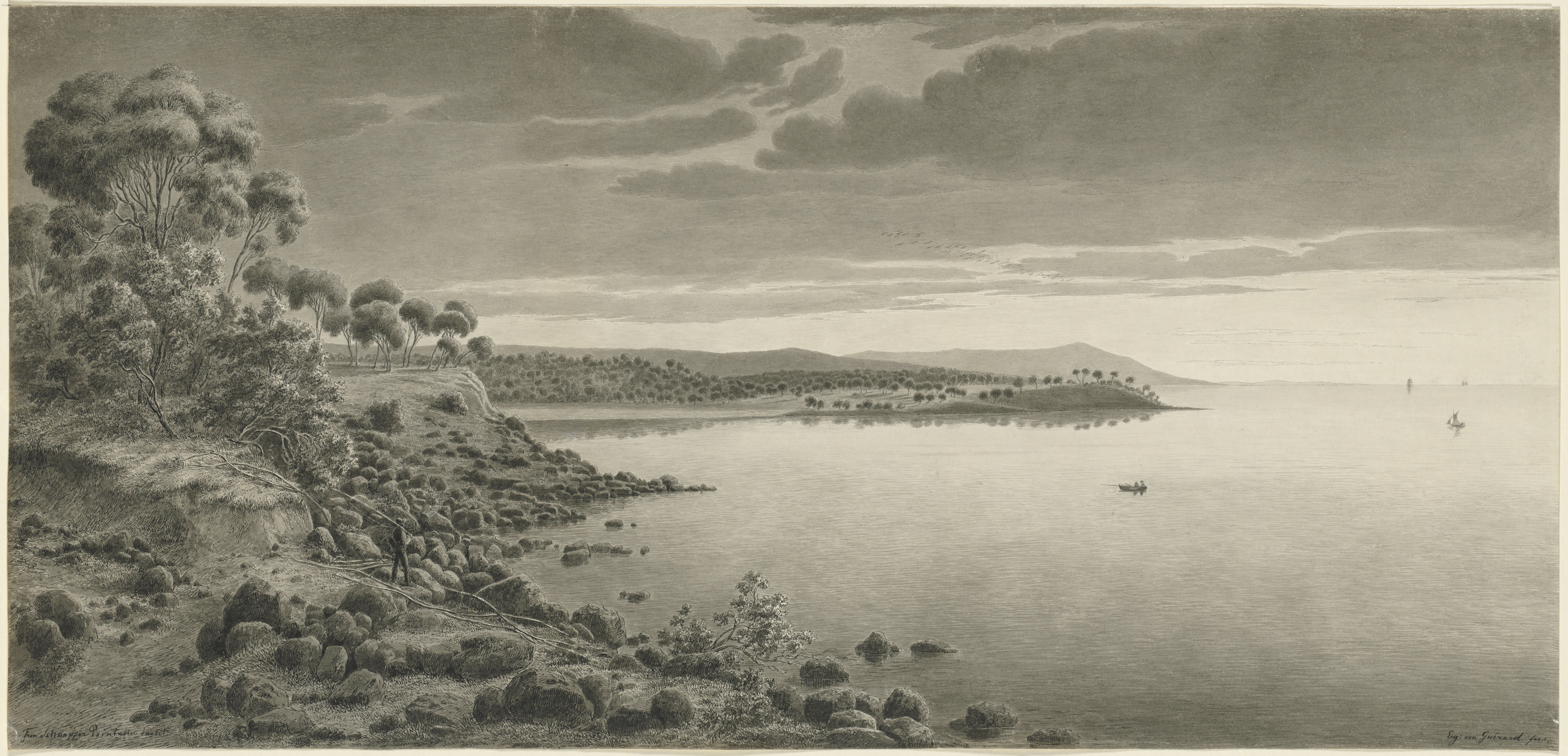
'Schnapper Point after sunset', Mornington, Victoria, 1859–63, Eugene Von Guerard

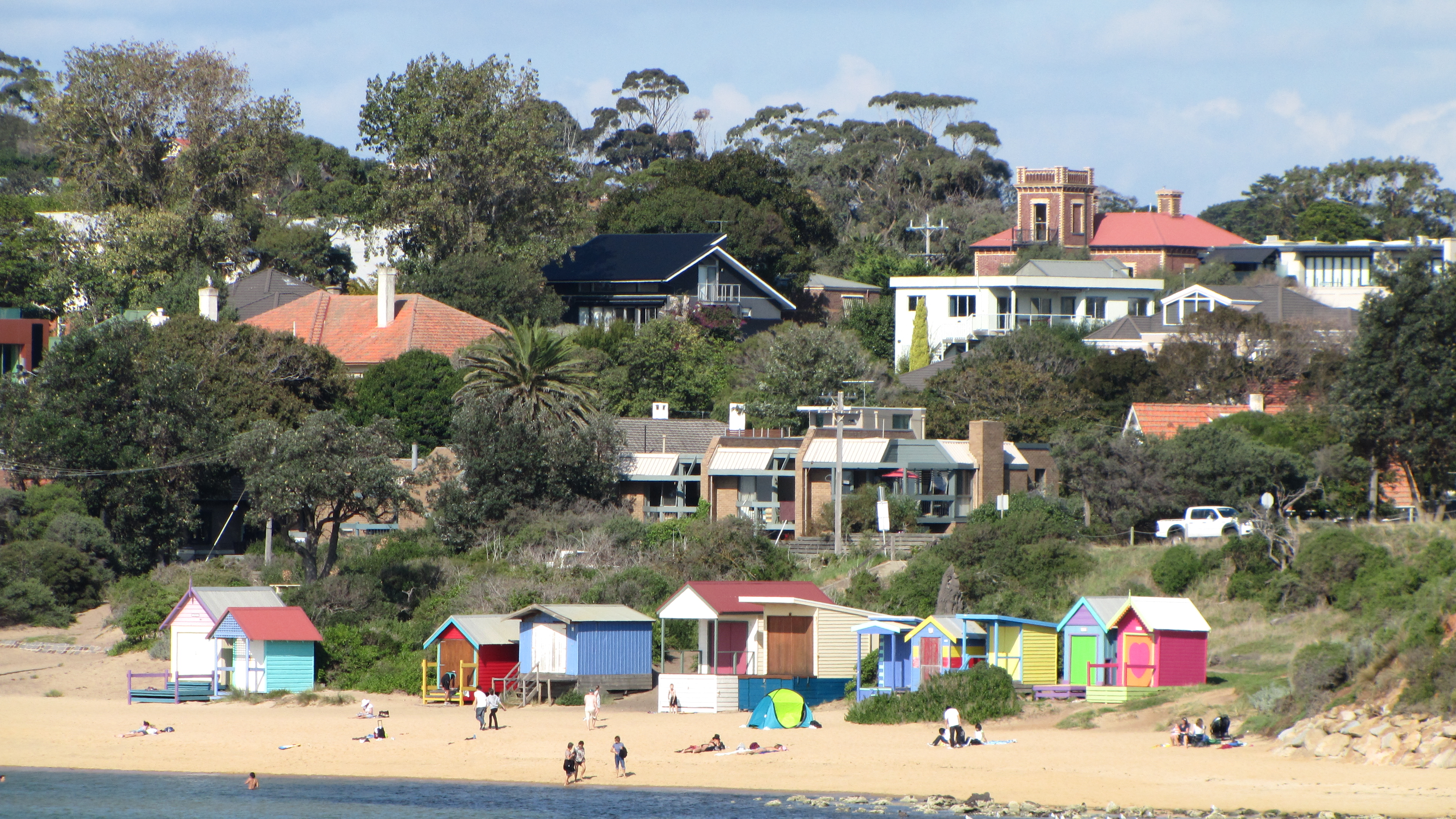
Mothers Beach

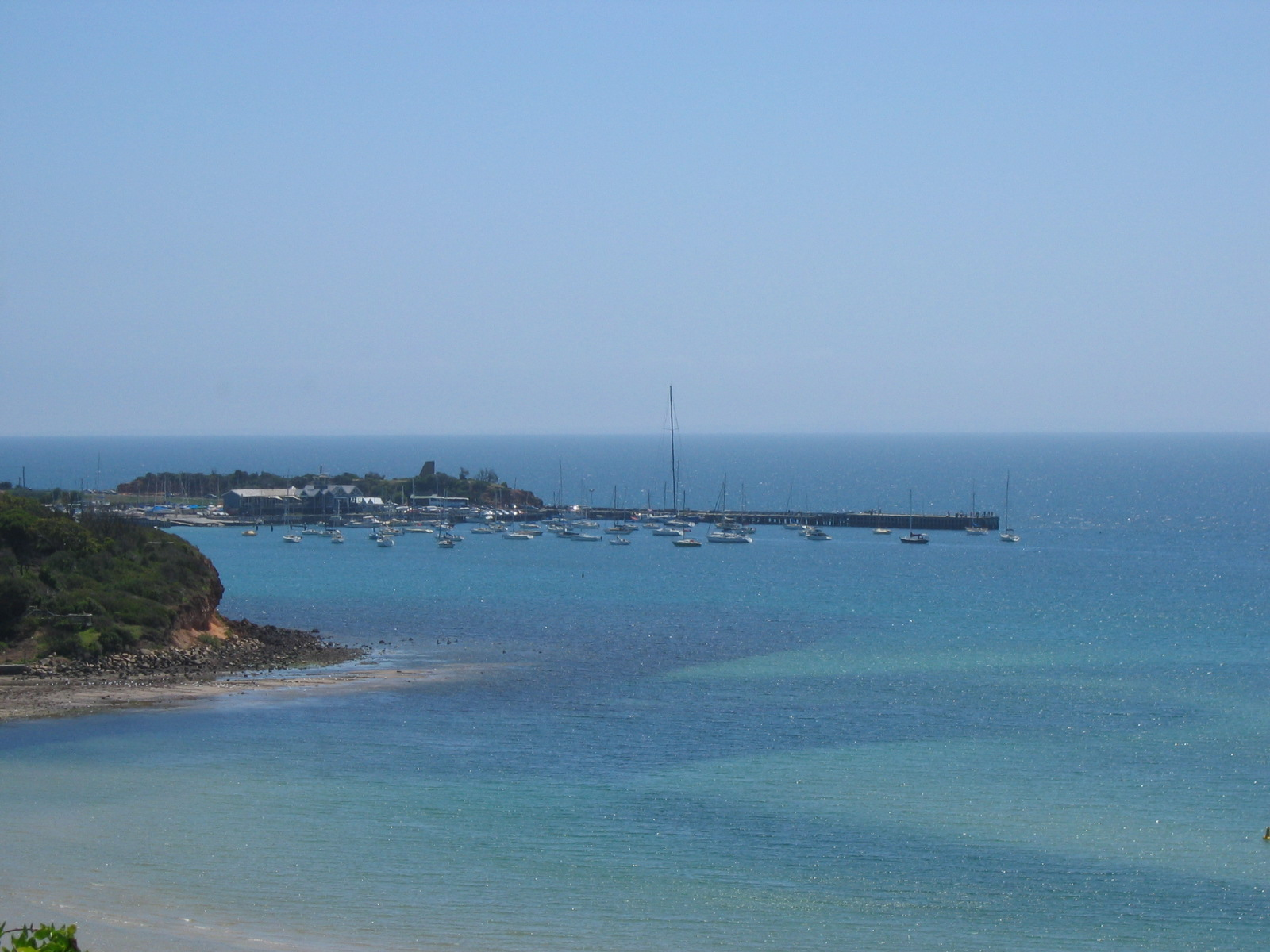
Mornington Yacht Club

Mornington is a seaside suburb of Melbourne, Victoria, Australia located on the Mornington Peninsula, 46 km (29 mi) south-east of Melbourne's Central Business District. It is the most populous locality in the Shire of Mornington Peninsula local government area. Mornington had a population of 25,759 at the 2021 census.

Mornington is a tourist destination renowned for its bay beaches and wineries, with a town centre that runs into the foreshore area and local beach.

== History ==
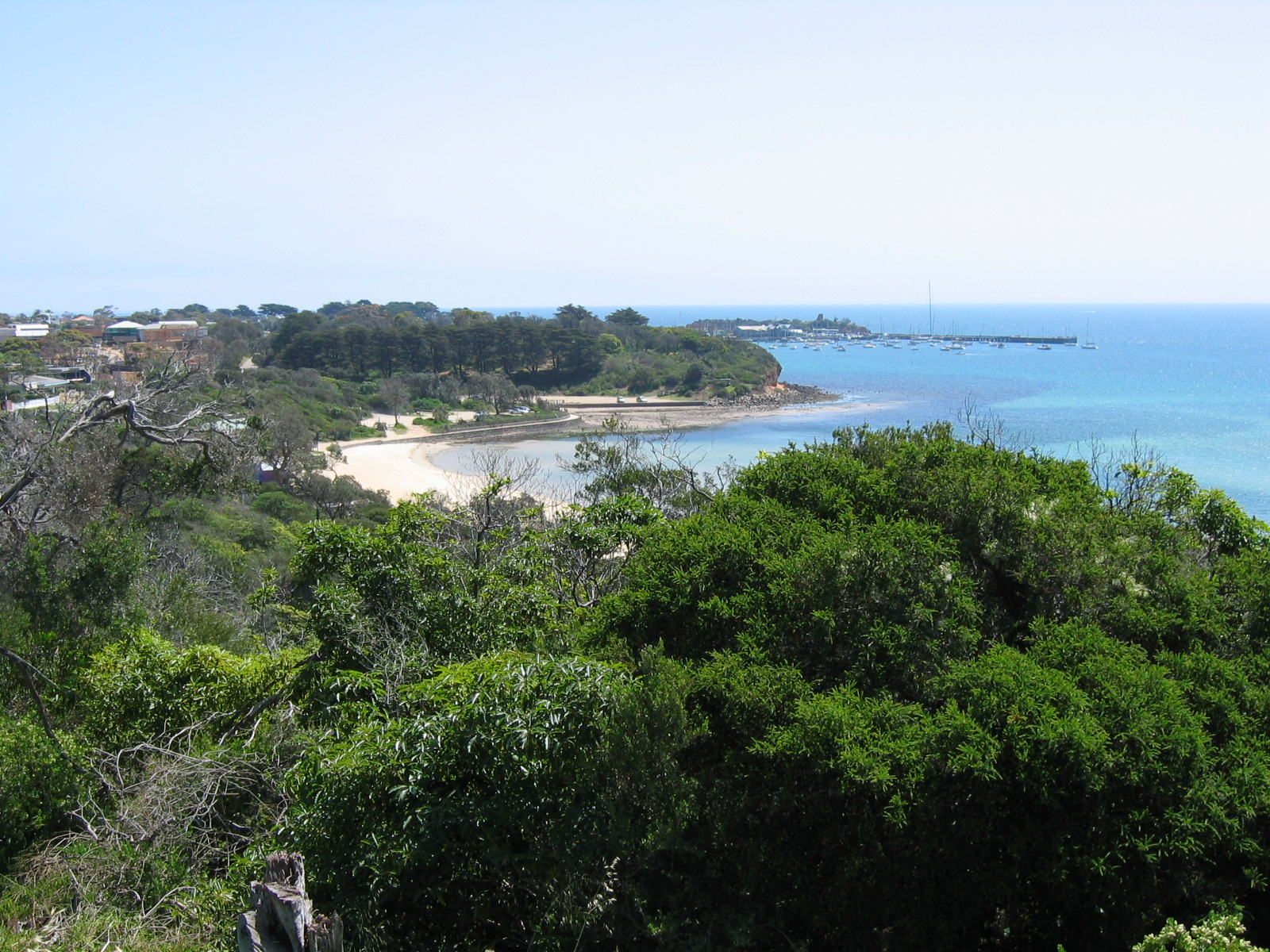
Mornington Yacht Club from Mills Beach

Originally home to the Indigenous Boonwurrung people, the first European settlers arrived in the area in the 1840s for fishing, logging and agriculture.

A 46-metre-long (151 ft) pier was opened in 1858 and became the social and economic gateway to the Mornington Peninsula, connecting the surrounding areas with Melbourne. Originally known as Schnapper (or Snapper) Point, the town was renamed Mornington in 1864 after the second Earl of Mornington. The Courthouse was built in 1861 and the Post Office in 1863. The Grand Hotel was originally opened in 1892 on Main Street as an alcohol-free Grand Coffee Palace designed by Melbourne architect William Pitt. Mornington became a popular tourist destination, with day trippers travelling from Melbourne on steamers from the 1860s.

The Mornington Railway line opened in 1889, connecting the township directly to Melbourne until it was closed in 1981.

In 1890, the Mount Martha Hotel, designed by architects Tappin, Gilbert and Dennehy, was constructed in a Federation Queen Anne style. Despite its name, the structure is located in Mornington. During World War II, the hotel was extensively used by the military and functioned as a Women's Royal Australian Army Corps (WRAAC) barracks up until 1978. The building is now known as Mount Martha House and has served as a community centre since 1979.

=== Heritage listings ===
The following places in Mornington are listed on the Victorian Heritage Register:

- Beleura, 1 Tallis Avenue
- Combe Martin, 819–820 The Esplanade
- Fossil Beach Cement Works, off The Esplanade
- Japanese Tea House, 675 The Esplanade
- Mount Martha House, 468 The Esplanade

== Population ==
In the 2021 Census, there were 25,759 people in Mornington. 77% of people were born in Australia. The next most common countries of birth were England 9.3%, New Zealand 1.4%, Scotland 1.3%, Ireland 0.8% and Italy 0.7%. 94% of people spoke only English at home. Other languages spoken at home included Italian 0.7%, Greek 0.6% and Spanish 0.4%. The most common responses for religion were No Religion 45%, Christian 45%, Hinduism 0.3% and Islam 0.2%. 41% of dwellings were owned outright, 32% were owned with a mortgage, and 21% were rented. Unemployment in 2021 was 3.8%. The top three industries of employment were Health Care and Social Assistance (16%), Construction (14%) and Retail Trade (10%).

== Culture ==
Mornington is an attractive destination for shopping, restaurants and cafes. The north of Mornington is home to several horse breeders and stables. It has a library and numerous parks, gardens and historical buildings, many of which are open to the public. It holds several annual festivals, and holds a market day in the main street every Wednesday and occasionally at the racecourse or at Mornington Park, which attracts hundreds of people.

The Mornington Peninsula Regional Gallery, opened in 1971, is the major art gallery for the region and hosts a number of major exhibitions, including the Archibald Prize in 2013. Surrounding the gallery are several parks and the Mornington Botanical Rose Gardens.

== Education ==
Within Mornington are several schools including Mornington Primary School, Mornington Secondary College, Mornington Park Primary School, St. Macartan's Parish Primary School, Padua College and Benton Junior College.

== Transport ==
Mornington is served by three major roadways, Peninsula Link (Mornington Peninsula Freeway), Nepean Highway and Moorooduc Highway.

Mornington was formerly served by a railway line until closure in 1981 following the Lonie report. Since 1991, it has been partially reopened as the heritage Mornington Tourist Railway.

Six bus routes serve the area as part of the Greater Melbourne bus network, including:

- 781 Frankston – Dromana via Mount Eliza & Mornington and Mount Martha
- 784 Frankston Station – Mornington via Mount Eliza
- 785 Frankston Station – Mornington East via Mount Eliza & Mornington
- 781-784-785 combined Frankston – Mt Eliza – Mornington East – Dromana
- 788 Frankston Station – Portsea via Dromana & Rosebud & Sorrento
- 886 Mornington – Hastings

== Recreation ==
=== Parks ===
The town centre runs into the foreshore area and local beach, which features a restaurant and park with playground facilities.

=== Sport ===
Mornington has an Australian Rules football team, the Mornington Bulldogs, competing in the Mornington Peninsula Football Netball League.

Mornington has a horse racing club, the Mornington Racing Club, which meets throughout the year, including the Mornington Cup meeting in March. The Mornington Racecourse also hosts the Peninsula Cup in November and monthly markets.

Mornington also has an active Yacht club, the Mornington Yacht Club, located at Schnapper Point.

Mornington is home to three sports grounds: Narambi Reserve, Alexandra Park and Dallas Brooks Park.

The suburb is also home to the Mornington Golf Club on Tallis Drive.

Mornington has a Field Hockey club, the Mornington Peninsula Falcons, competing in the Hockey Victoria Association.

Terri Sawyer, the 19-year-old driver who won the first AUSCAR race at the Calder Park Raceway in Melbourne in February 1988, was a resident of Mornington. She died of cancer on 12 April 2026.

== Climate ==
Mornington has an oceanic climate (Cfb) with warm and occasionally hot summers and mild winters where temperatures below freezing are very rare occasions.

Climate data for Mornington
Month	Jan	Feb	Mar	Apr	May	Jun	Jul	Aug	Sep	Oct	Nov	Dec	Year
Record high °C (°F)	40.2 (104.4)	41.6 (106.9)	37.4 (99.3)	30.7 (87.3)	25.7 (78.3)	19.3 (66.7)	19.3 (66.7)	23.3 (73.9)	26.1 (79.0)	29.4 (84.9)	35.1 (95.2)	38.7 (101.7)	41.6 (106.9)
Mean daily maximum °C (°F)	25.0 (77.0)	25.0 (77.0)	23.3 (73.9)	19.4 (66.9)	16.2 (61.2)	13.5 (56.3)	12.8 (55.0)	13.8 (56.8)	15.9 (60.6)	18.1 (64.6)	20.3 (68.5)	23.1 (73.6)	18.9 (66.0)
Mean daily minimum °C (°F)	13.4 (56.1)	13.9 (57.0)	12.9 (55.2)	10.9 (51.6)	9.1 (48.4)	7.2 (45.0)	6.5 (43.7)	6.9 (44.4)	8.1 (46.6)	9.5 (49.1)	10.7 (51.3)	12.1 (53.8)	10.1 (50.2)
Record low °C (°F)	7.3 (45.1)	7.4 (45.3)	2.5 (36.5)	3.8 (38.8)	0.6 (33.1)	−0.6 (30.9)	−1.2 (29.8)	−0.1 (31.8)	−0.6 (30.9)	3.4 (38.1)	4.5 (40.1)	6.6 (43.9)	−1.2 (29.8)
Average rainfall mm (inches)	44.1 (1.74)	43.1 (1.70)	49.4 (1.94)	62.6 (2.46)	70.2 (2.76)	71.2 (2.80)	69.0 (2.72)	71.3 (2.81)	71.8 (2.83)	69.6 (2.74)	60.1 (2.37)	54.3 (2.14)	736.7 (29.01)
Average rainy days (≥ 0.2mm)	7.1	6.5	8.0	10.8	13.8	14.7	15.3	15.6	14.4	13.0	10.6	8.6	138.4
Source: Bureau of Meteorology

== Notable residents ==
- Terry Denton ((1950-2026), illustrator and editor
- Margaret Dick (1918–2008), microbiologist
- Brodie Harper (born 1981), TV presenter
- Finola Moorhead (born 1947), novelist

== Gallery ==
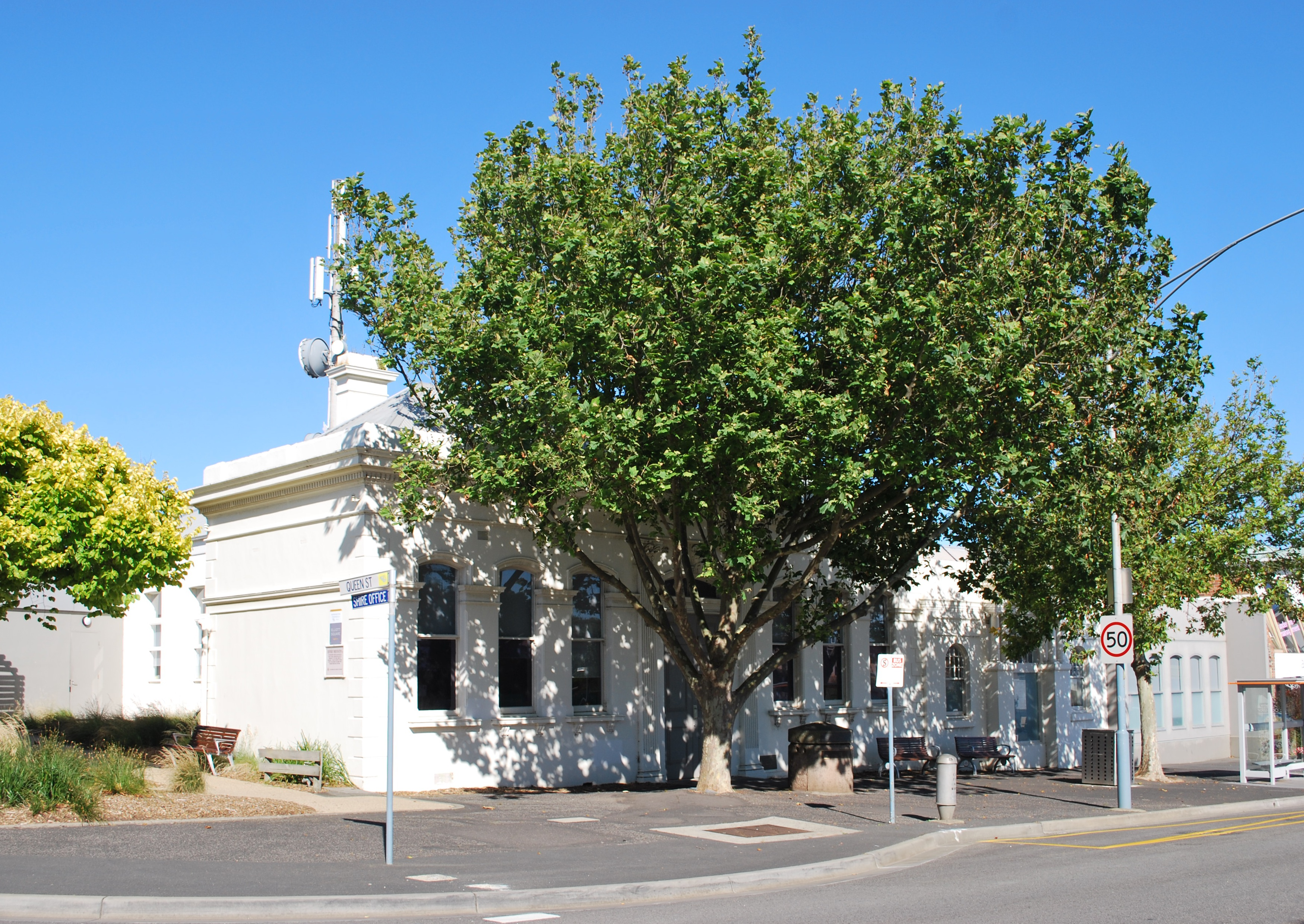
Mornington Mechanics Institute

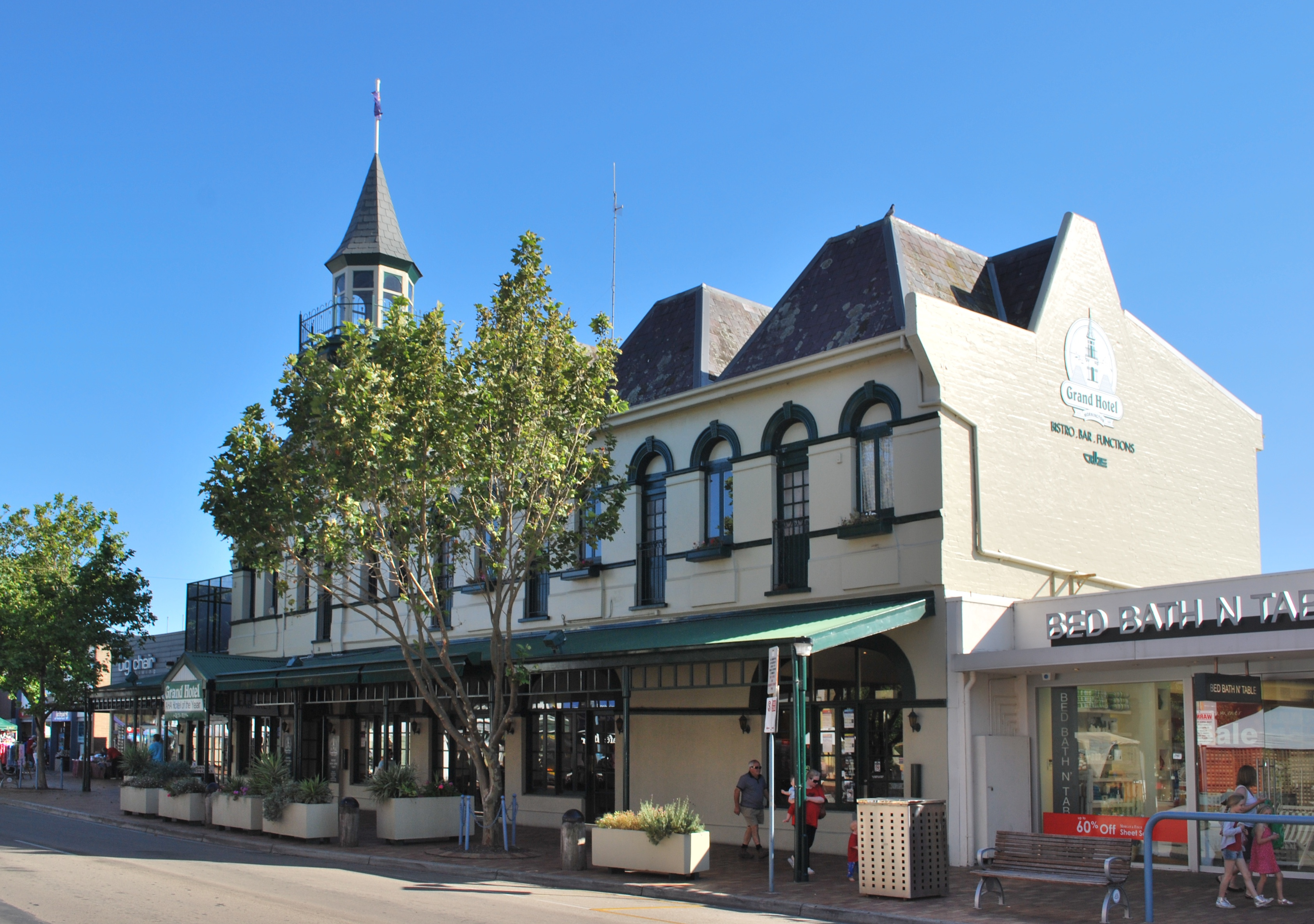
Mornington Grand Hotel

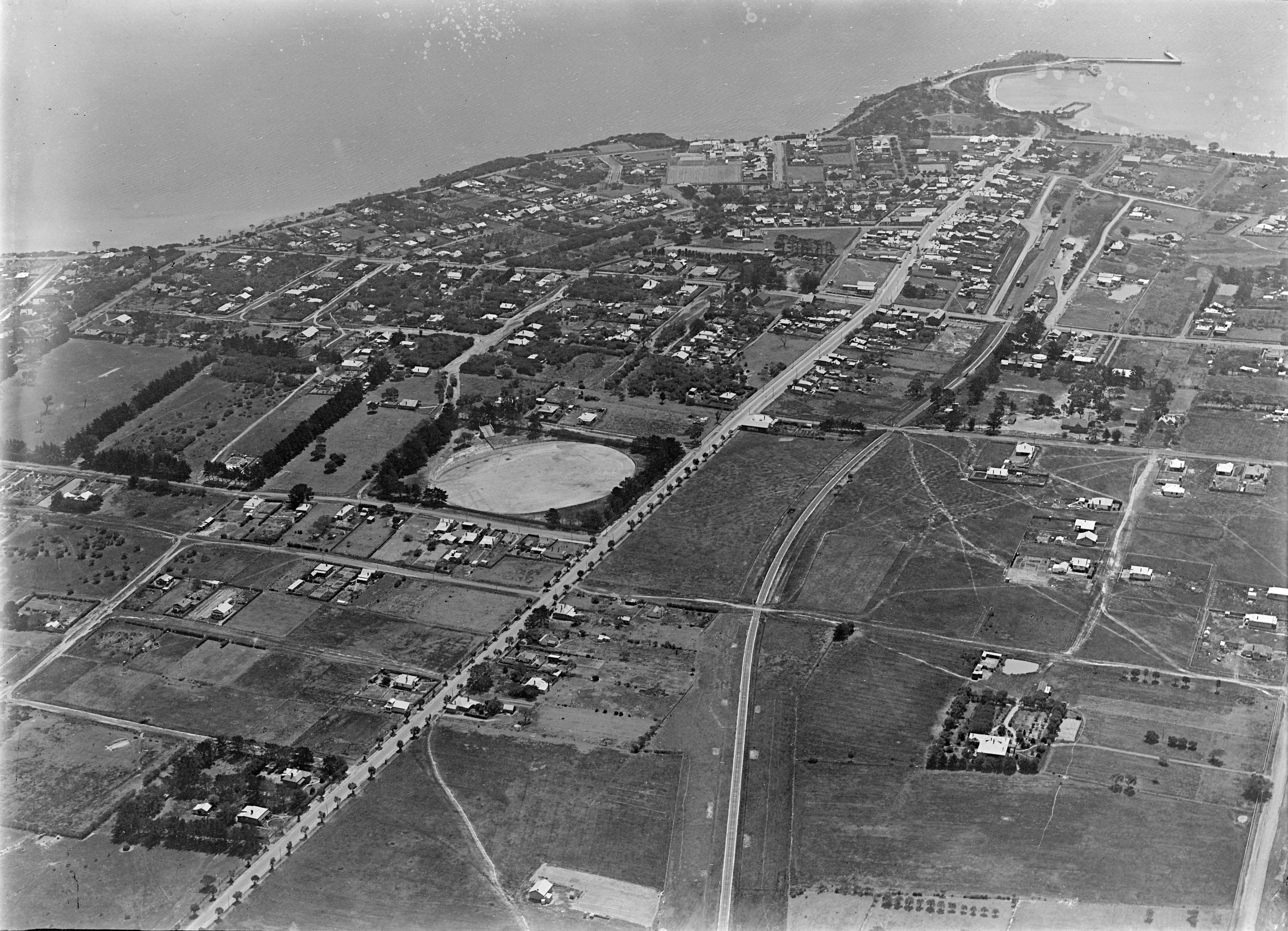
Historic aerial photo of Mornington 1940 looking west

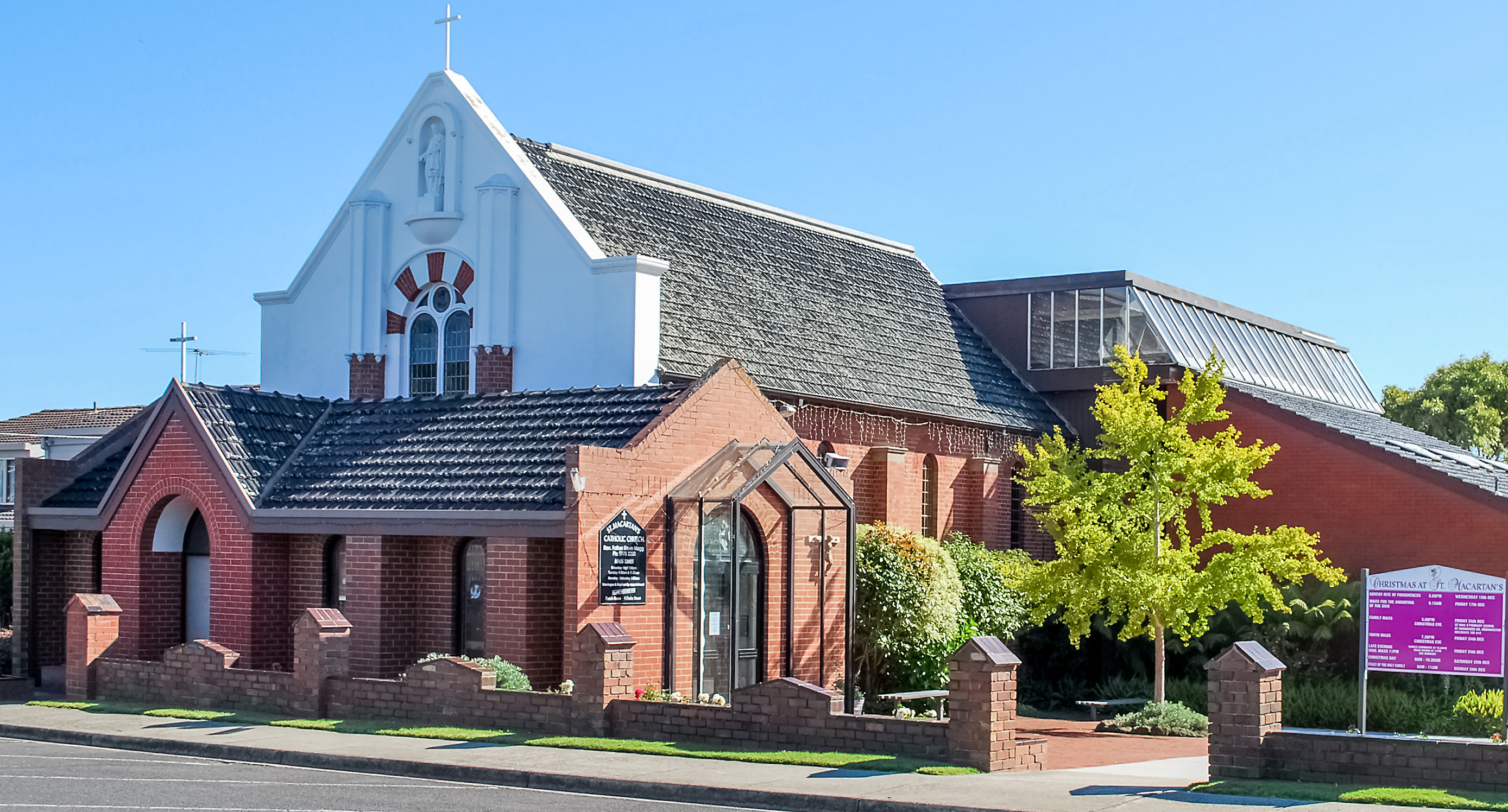
Catholic Church at Mornington

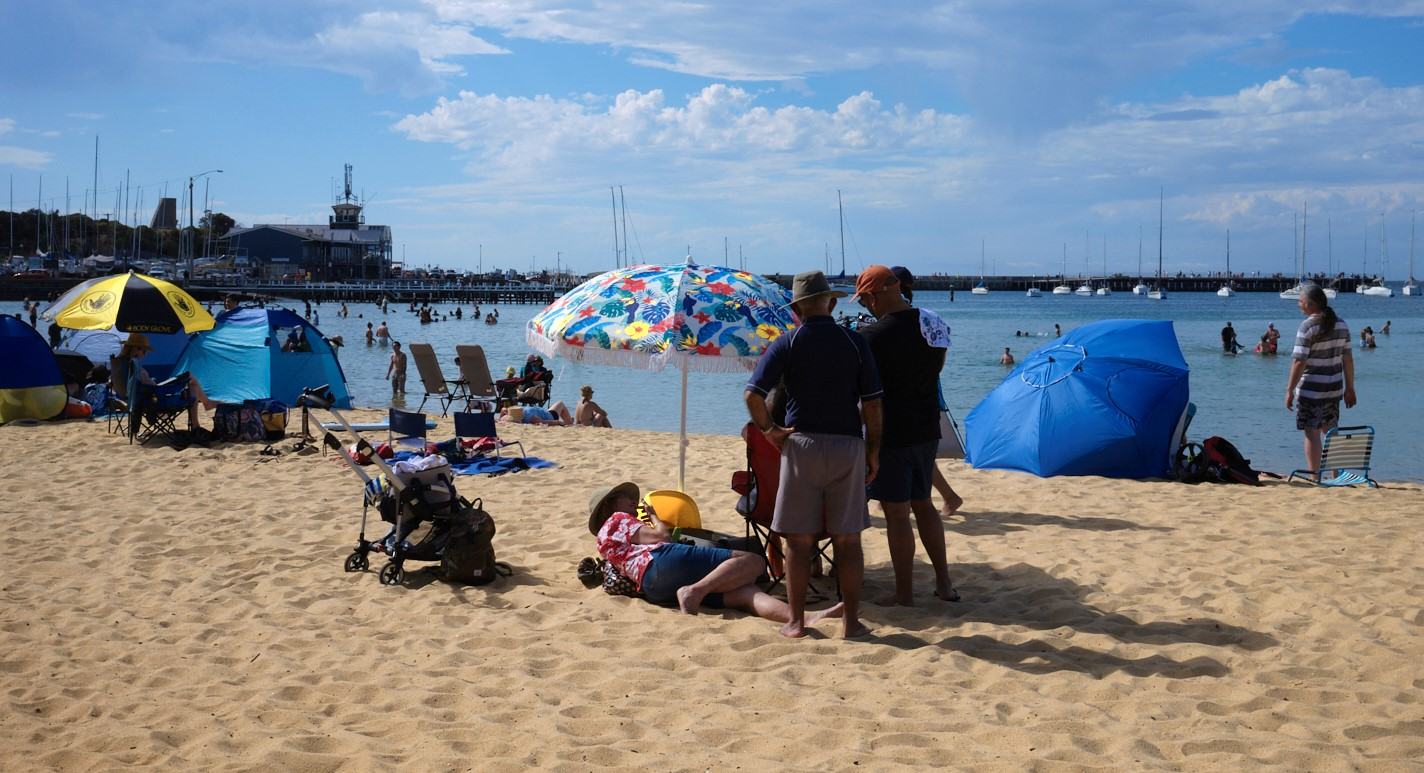
Mothers beach, Mornington Peninsula

== See also ==
- Shire of Mornington – Mornington was previously within this former local government area.
