= The Briars (Mt Martha) =

Heritage-listed homestead and conservation park in Melbourne, Victoria, Australia

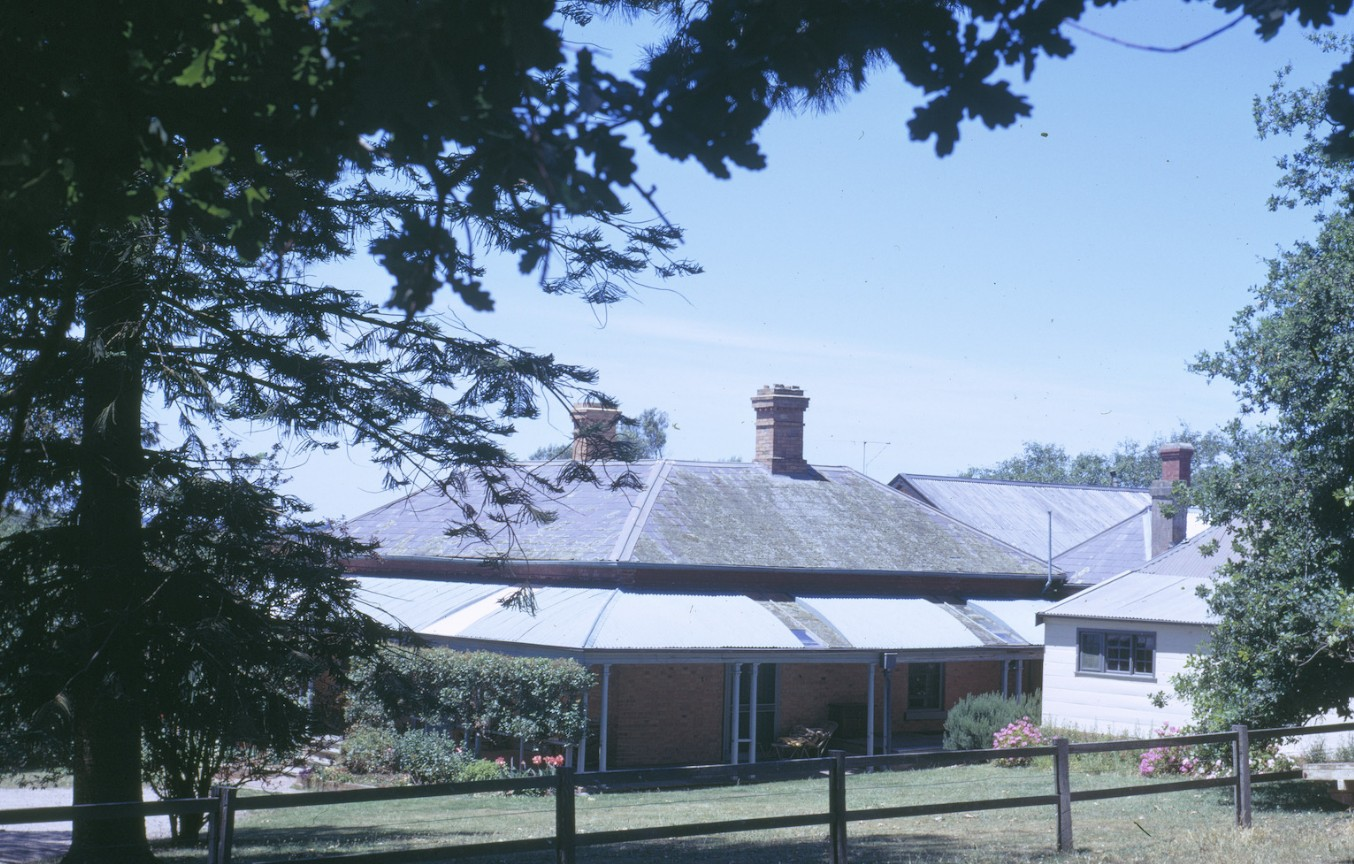
- The Briars Homestead, 1970

- Location of the homestead and conservation park in Greater Metropolitan Melbourne
- Former names: Tichin-Gorourke; Checkingkurk; Briars House

General information
- Status: Completed
- Type: Homestead, history museum, and gardens; Conservation park
- Architectural style: early Victorian; Edwardian
- Location: 450 Nepean Highway, Mount Martha, Mornington Peninsula, Melbourne, Victoria, Australia
- Coordinates: 38°16′13″S 145°02′43″E
- Named for: Briars, Saint Helena
- Year built: 1840–1947
- Completed: 1846; 180 years ago
- Client: Alexander Balcombe
- Owner: Alexander Balcombe and family (1840s–1976); Shire of Mornington Peninsula and National Trust of Australia (Victoria) (jointly, since 1976)

Technical details
- Material: Timber; limestone bricks; red bricks; weatherboard; corrugated iron; asbestos cement
- Floor count: 1
- Grounds: 405 ha (1,000 acres) (1854–1976); 8 ha (20 acres) (since 1976); 220 ha (540 acres) (adjacent site)

Website
- mornpen.vic.gov.au/Things-to-do/The-Briars; nationaltrust.org.au/places/the-briars/

Site notes
- Management: Shire of Mornington Peninsula
- Visitors: 200,000 (in 2024)
- Public access: Temporarily closed (homestead only, as of 2026)

Victorian Heritage Register
- Official name: The Briars
- Type: Registered place
- Designated: 9 October 1974
- Reference no.: H0320
- Heritage overlay no.: HO147
- Categories: Farming and Grazing; Parks, Gardens and Trees; Residential buildings (private); Collections

Register of the National Estate
- Official name: The Briars, Mount Martha
- Type: Defunct register
- Designated: 21 March 1978
- Reference no.: 5833

The Briars is an historic homestead, history museum, and gardens, set on eight hectares (twenty acres), located at 450 Nepean Highway, in Mount Martha, on the Mornington Peninsula, in the south-eastern suburbs of Melbourne, in Victoria, Australia. Adjacent to the heritage site is a 220-hectare (540-acre) conservation park, that is managed in conjunction with the homestead, museum, and gardens.

Located on the traditional lands of the Bunurong people, approximately 2,400 hectares (6,000 acres) was established as a pastoral run in the 1840s and leased by Alexander Beatson Balcombe, in c. 1846. Balcombe purchased 400 hectares (1,000 acres) in 1854 and set about building a homestead in stages from over twenty years, along with additions by his ancestors in the twentieth century. Collectively, these farm buildings comprise some of the oldest surviving built structures on the Mornington Peninsula. Much reduced from its initial size, in 1976, the descendants of Alexander Beatson Balcombe gifted the remaining 8-hectare (20-acre) portion jointly to the Shire of Mornington Peninsula and the Victorian branch of the National Trust and the site has operated as an historic homestead with gardens, a plant nursery, a public regional park, and other private facilities such as an outdoor education camp.

The 8-hectare (20-acre) site was added to the Victorian Heritage Register on 9 October 1974 in recognition of its historical and architectural significance; and was also added to non-statutory lists by the Victorian branch of the National Trust on 14 August 2012; the now defunct Register of the National Estate on 21 March 1978; and the Victorian Heritage Inventory on an unknown date. The site is part of a larger area of 777 hectares (1,920 acres), also listed on the defunct Register on an unknown date, that contains a group of pre-emptive right properties.

The adjacent 220 hectares (540 acres) was purchased by the Shire of Mornington Peninsula from the descendants of the Balcombe family in 1976, and part of the former grazing land has been converted for conservation use, primarily as a wildlife sanctuary.

The homestead, museum, and gardens are open to the public. However, as of August 2026, the homestead was temporarily closed for restoration.

== History ==
=== Early colonial history ===
Owned by John Vockin, Captain James Reid settled on the pastoral lease named Tichin-Gorourke, (Note: Also spelled as Checkingkurk.) the Bunurong word for ‘voice of many frogs’. The original Tichin-Gorourke pastoral run stretched from Mount Eliza to Mornington. In 1844, Georgiana McCrae sketched the property.

=== Balcombe family ===
William

William Balcombe was born in Sussex, England and served as an administrator for the East India Company in Saint Helena, from 1807. In the grounds of his Saint Helena estate was a pavilion, called The Briars, that, in 1815, served as the temporary home of the exiled Napoleon Bonaparte. One of Balcombe's daughters, Betsy, as the only member of the family who could speak French, befriended Napoleon, and began the family's collection of Napoleonic memorabilia. Because of his family's closeness to Napoleon, Governor Hudson Lowe became suspicious, and in 1818, William Balcombe was recalled to England. Prior to the formation of responsible government in the Colony of New South Wales in 1856, Balcombe was offered a post as the first Colonial Treasurer in 1824; and served until hs death in 1829. William purchased 1,619 hectares (4,000 acres) at Carwoola by the Molonglo River and called it "The Briars". It is believed that here he was responsible for introducing two plants to Australia, the Sweet Briar (Rosa rubiginosa) and the Weeping Willow (Salix babylonica). The willow grew nearby Napoleon's grave on Saint Helena and Balcombe is reported to have taken cuttings from these trees.

Alexander and descendants

In addition to Betsy, William's other children included Jane (1800-1824), Mary (1806-1807), William, Jnr. (1808-1852), Thomas (1810—1861), and Alexander (1811–1877), the later three who were born in St Helena. Thomas became a became a painter, lithographer, and sculptor. One of Thomas' sons, William Alexander, later moved to Wahroonga, Sydney, and also named his house there The Briars.

Alexander Beatson Balcombe and his wife, Emma Juana, took livestock from Carwoola and drove them south, eventually acquiring a pastoral lease of 2,400 hectares (6,000 acres) in c. 1846, that he renamed initially as "Briars House" and then, simply, "The Briars". William, Jnr and Alexander both worked on the New South Wales goldfields in the 1850s, where William Jnr died. In 1854, Balcombe converted the pastoral lease of 400 hectares (1,000 acres) of The Briars into freehold, that he purchased. There he set about producing wine (Note: The first vines were planted in 1864.) and grazing sheep and cattle. Alexander and Emma Balcombe built the homestead in stages from the late 1840s, 1850s and 1860s, with additions in the twentieth century made by their descendants. In 1855, Alexander became a magistrate.

Alexander died in 1877 and Emma in 1907; (Note: The Master Plan states that Emma died in 1924. However, this would appear to be a misprint, and it was most likely to refer to the death of Jane Emma Balcombe, in 1924.) and in the latter part of the 19th century, the homestead became a summer residence for the family. The eldest daughter, Jane Emma, acquired ownership in 1907 until her death in 1924, and it became a residence for one of her children, Alexander Balcombe Murphy, and his family. Murphy made several improvements during his residency, including a brick east wing to the homestead (c. 1907), and replaced the bedroom wing that was built in the 1860s; a new kitchen (c. 1947) that replaced the original kitchen wing; and a tennis court and croquet lawn, plus garden improvements.

Murphy died in 1935 and following the death of his wife, in 1957 the 445-hectare (1,100-acre) property was divided between their three children – sisters, Mary Moore and Elizabeth a’Beckett, bought out their other sister, Anne. Moore and a’Beckett built the lower tennis court, a swimming pool, the driveway, and the garage. Mary Moore subsequently sold her share, the southern half, in 1972; and the remaining a’Beckett portion comprised the homestead and the northern half of the original 1854 estate.

Dame Mabel Brookes DBE, a granddaughter of Alexander and Emma Balcombe, inherited many items given to the family by Napoleon. Later, she acquired further pieces to complete what is now known as the Dame Mabel Brookes Napoleonic Collection.

=== Gifted estate ===
In 1976, Elizabeth a’Beckett's sons, Richard, Tony, and Michael, gifted the eight-hectare (twenty-acre) homestead and adjacent gardens site jointly to the Shire of Mornington Peninsula and the Victorian branch of the National Trust. They also sold the northern section, comprising 220 hectares (540 acres) of farm land, to the Shire of Mornington Peninsula, of which, as of 2025, ninety hectares (two hundred and twenty-two acres) was converted as a wildlife sanctuary. The Briars remained in the Balcombe family, as a working farm, from 1846 until 1976 and is one of very few pioneer grazing homesteads that survive today.

The Briars first public open day was in 1977. The following years saw the establishment of extensive tree planting (1983), a wetlands (1985), a visitor's centre (1988), an outdoor education camp and plant nursery (1997), and an ecological display centre (2009).

== Description ==
The Briars once had at least forty buildings on the property, of which about seventeen remain. Some of the farm outbuildings date from c. 1843, including the first timber hut for Alexander and Emma Balcombe. The majority of the homestead was completed in a typical early Victorian style, the buildings are representative of a typical homestead of the period. There are various wings and outbuildings, some of which may be older than the main house.

The homestead is single storey and symmetrical in design, with a skillion on the north side and a verandah along the south. It was constructed in brick, originally with a hipped shingle roof, now covered with corrugated iron and extended. The encircling verandah with convex iron roof is supported on paired timber columns and rooms open onto the verandah through French windows. The narrow south brick wing was probably built either before 1857 or in 1861-2, and a weatherboard bedroom wing was added c. 1860. The almost square north wing is of brick with a hipped roof, with its surrounding verandah and cellar was added c. 1866, and altered in the late nineteenth century. The Edwardian red brick east wing originally contained one very large room, used as a dining room. It has none of the flamboyance usually associated with the Edwardian period, but reflects the simpler architecture of the older north wing.

The kitchen addition to the east wing is of asbestos cement. Nearby surviving outbuildings include a small brick building, probably built between 1857 and 1862, clad with corrugated iron at one end, and with a hipped metal roof, which once contained a laundry and dairy; a concrete block apple store, built in the early twentieth century; and further away from the house the early brick stables and barn.

Alexander and Emma Balcombe also developed an extensive garden, as well as an orchard, vineyard and a productive kitchen garden. Remnants of this garden, including some mature trees, survive, and the homestead stands amid an unspoilt picturesque rural landscape.

== See also ==
- Architecture of Melbourne
- List of museums in Victoria
- List of places on the Victorian Heritage Register in the Shire of Mornington Peninsula
