= Michel Dancoisne-Martineau =

French Consul of Saint Helena

Michel Dancoisne-Martineau (born 5 December 1965, Voyennes) is the director of the French domains of Saint Helena. Since October 1990, he has been Honorary French Consul on the island.

== Career ==
Born in Voyennes, France, Michel Dancoisne went to a high school in Amiens and attended a university in Besançon. After failing his university studies, he went back to Picardie. After reading a biography of Lord Byron, he contacted the author, Gilbert Martineau, the previous French consul of Saint Helena. The latter having no children adopted him. Dancoisne-Martineau followed him to Saint Helena.

Since 1987, Dancoisne-Martineau has been the manager of the three properties owned by the French Government on Saint Helena. Among other projects, he completed the restoration of Longwood Gardens to its 1821 state, using original documents from the Saint Helena archives to collect the original furniture.

From 1987 to 1998, Dancoisne-Martineau managed the historical reconstruction of the admiral's apartment at the Briars Pavilion, the former residence of Napoleon, which was completed in 2015. From 2010 to 2013, he managed, in partnership with the Fondation Napoléon, the "Save Longwood House" fundraising campaign. In 2008, he donated 1.67 acres of land around the Briars to the French Government, to guarantee visitor access to the site. https://fondationnapoleon.org/en/activities-and-services/preserving-heritage/operation-st-helena/#:~:text=The%20last%20property%20was%20acquired,from%20uncontrolled%20urbanisation)%20in%202004.

In May 2011, he published Chroniques de Sainte-Hélène Atlantique Sud, a collection of accounts describing life on the island by some of the lesser-known characters of the days of Napoleon on the island. https://www.napoleon.org/magazine/livres/chroniques-de-sainte-helene-atlantique-sud/

From 2012 until 2014, he was consultant and architect's project manager for the rehabilitation of the National domain at Longwood (case n°7425) Between 2013 - 2016, he was commissioner, along with Emilie Robbe, of the scientific Committee for the exhibition "Napoleon at St Helena –at the Conquest of memory", from Wednesday 6 April to Sunday 24 July 2016 at the Musée de l'Armée - Hôtel national des Invalides. https://www.musee-armee.fr/ExpoNapoleonSainteHelene/doc/MA-napoleon-sainte-helene-pressrelease.pdf

For the bicentenary of Napoleon on St. Helena (2015–2021), he has published a history of Napoleon's time on Saint Helena, in a 12-volume bilingual French/English series. He told the story of his life in the highly acclaimed Je suis le gardien du tombeau vide (2017) https://www.napoleon.org/magazine/livres/je-suis-le-gardien-du-tombeau-vide/

== Publications ==
- Le dernier Napoléon: 1819-1821 - PASSES COMPOSES, 2025
- Je suis le Gardien du Tombeau vide – Flammarion., paris, 2017
- Napoleon and Saint Helena, the end of an Emperor/ Napoléon à Sainte-Hélène, l'écueil d'un empire 12 Volume bilingual English/French Series (Editions MDM Productions Ltd)
- Contribution to catalogue of the exhibition " Napoléon à Sainte-Hélène: La conquête de la mémoire. Gallimard, 2016
- In Napoleon’s footsteps on St. Helena, the places of exile today – published in 2015 by Saint Helena Napoleonic Heritage Limited
- A story of masks, - study on the death masks of Napoleon – Magazine of the Souvenir Napoléonien #489, May/June 2011
- Chroniques de Sainte-Hélène - Atlantique sud – Perrin, Paris – 2011
- Contribution in Napoleon and the Invalides, Collections of the Army’s Museum – Chapter "the two Tombs of Napoleon" – Ed. Musée de l'Armée - Editions de la Revue Napoleon, Paris – 2010
- The today's situation of St. Helena, Magazine of the Souvenir Napoléonien #482, February/March 2010
- Napoleon's exile on St. Helena – bilingual edition from the "St.Helena Tourism office", 2008
- St. Helena Island, then & Now – Cultural project and book directed for the St-Helena Education department with the Prince Andrew School students, Cape town, 2007
- Sainte-Hélène, île de mémoire – (together with Thierry Lentz & Bernard Chevallier) – Ed. Fayard, Paris 2005
- the Napoleonic Sites on St. Helena Island – Ed. South Atlantic, 2002
- official Poster for the Q5 (500 Years) Celebration of the discovery of St. Helena island made out of 500 portraits of "Saints"
- St. Helena, 500 Years of History - Photographer in the commemorative leaflet published by the St. Helena Government in 2002
- Flowers from the Gardens of Napoleon on St-Helena island – 2 volumes of the St. Helena endemics, 1999 (volume 1) & 2000 (volume 2)
- Guide of the French Properties – Ed. Solomon & Co., St-Helena island, 1995

== Awards ==
- 2018 - Honorary Member of the Order of the British Empire
- 2016 - Knight of the National Order of Legion of Honor
- 2015 - Medal of Honor For the French Ministry of Foreign office (Bronze)
- 2012 - Knight of the National Order of Merit (of France)
- 2011 - First Empire Prize of the Foundation Napoléon
- 2005 - Knighthood of Arts And Literature by the Ministry of Culture and Communication
