= Thomas Tyrwhitt Balcombe =

Painter, lithographer and sculptor in C19th Australia

Thomas Tyrwhitt Balcombe (1810—1861) was a survey draftsman, who became a painter, lithographer, and sculptor, working in colonial-era New South Wales, Australia. The subject matter of his works included animals, landscapes, the lives of Aboriginal Australians, and the early years of the New South Wales gold rush.

== Family background and early life ==
He was the son of the first Colonial Treasurer of New South Wales, William Balcombe (1778—1829), who was in office from 1824 to his death in 1829, and his wife, Jane (1772—?). His father previously had been an official of the East India Company, on St Helena, arriving there in 1807. It was there on St Helena that Thomas Tyrwhitt Balcombe was born on 15 June 1810. He was reputedly a descendant or relative of Sir Anthony Van Dyke (1599 – 1641), the Flemish Baroque artist who became the leading court painter in England, through his paternal grandmother, Mary nee Van Dyke (1757—1818), but that remains uncertain. It is probable that he was named after Sir Thomas Tyrwhitt, Usher of the Black Rod from 1812 to 1832—who was acquainted with his father— rather than the scholar and writer, Thomas Tyrwhitt.

His mother, Jane Wilson nee Green, had been the widow of an army surgeon, John Byng, when she married William Balcombe in 1799. She inherited Byng's estate. Various references give the maiden name of this apparently formidable woman as being Cranston.

During the first period of his exile to St Helena—before he moved into Longwood House—Napoleon Bonaparte stayed in a pavilion, in the garden of the Balcombes' house, Briars. Young Thomas was said to have been a favourite of the ex-emperor, but it is his elder sister, Lucia Elizabeth 'Betsy' Balcombe (1802 − 1871), who is best known as Napoleon's friend. Betsy was the only one of the Balcombe family who spoke French reasonably well, and she acted as an interpreter. In 1844, she wrote a book on the subject. There were three other siblings Jane Balcombe (1800 - 1824), William Balcombe, Jun. (1808 - 1852) and Alexander Beatson Balcombe (1811–1877). Another child, Mary Balcombe (1806 - 1807), had died before Thomas Balcombe was born.

So close was the Balcombe family to Napoleon that the governor of St Helena, Lieutenant-General Sir Hudson Lowe, grew suspicious and he had the family removed from the island in 1818. After resettling in Devon, England, and still living there under of suspicion having aided Napoleon, the family arrived in Sydney, on the ship Hibernia, in March 1824. Their eldest daughter, Jane, had died at sea. Betsy—by then a deserted wife, Mrs Abell—and her daughter also came with the rest of the family. Mrs Balcombe and Mrs Abell soon established themselves in the high society of Sydney.

William Balcombe was an inexperienced Colonial Treasurer, but seems to have been left to is own devices by Governor Brisbane, a personal friend. He worked from his house in O'Connell Street rather than having an office. He did not deposit government monies in the colonial banks, until required to do so, by Governor Darling, in 1827. Reportedly, at times, he kept treasury monies in his bedroom. He was subject to criticism when the Bank of New South Wales had trouble exchanging its notes for silver currency. However, his time in office was not without achievements, notably the completion of the replacement of the holey dollar currency with the pound sterling.

Thomas Tyrwhitt Balcombe attended, Sydney Public Free Grammar School, the predecessor of Sydney Grammar School, as did his brother, Alexander Beatson Balcombe. His elder brother, William Balcombe, Jun., had been appointed as superintendent of the Australian Agricultural Company. Balcombe obtained work with that company. At Port Stephens, he fell from a horse, injuring his head, which seems to have had a lifelong impact on him.

William Balcombe had been granted land by Governor Brisbane—2650 acres near Bungonia, on which was erected an eight room stone cottage and other improvements—and he had purchased 4,000 acres of Crown land at Melangalo [sic]. He was also granted five acres of urban land at Wooloomooloo Bay, by Governor Darling.

William Balcombe died unexpectedly in 1829—after suffering from gout, but dying of dysentery—heavily in debt and leaving his finances in an untidy state. Much of his livestock and land was put up for sale. Adding to the family's misfortune, the house of the widowed Mrs Balcombe was "plundered", in a violent robbery in late March 1830. However, the family either retained control over some rural land or were given new grants, as a form of assistance, during the rule of Governor Ralph Darling. Mrs Balcombe, had gone to London to ask for assistance from the Colonial Office; she was given £250 to return to the colony with her daughter Betsy and Betsy's daughter, and promised land grants and appointments for her children. Mother and daughter made a trip to England in 1831—on Nancy, which called at St Helena— returning to Sydney in March 1833, on Ellen. In May 1833, the two women were robbed by two armed men, while on their way to Liverpool.

Thomas Balcombe was granted 1,000 acres, at the confluence of the Goulburn and Hunter Rivers, which is near what is now Denman.

Mrs Balcombe, Mrs Abell, and Miss Abell—mother, daughter and grand-daughter—left Sydney for England, in March 1834, aboard Sir Joseph Banks, arriving in January 1835, leaving only the three sons of the family in Australia.

Alexander Balcombe ran a property at Carawoola, a property he which was named 'The Briars', but resided at Kenmore near Goulburn. In 1838, Alexander sold the land, and moved to Mount Martha, in the Port Phillip District, where his new home—still standing—was also named 'The Briars'.

== Career ==
In September 1830, Balcombe obtained a position as a draftsman in the Surveyor-General's department, with an annual salary of £150. That was during the time that the Surveyor-General was Sir Thomas Mitchell (1855). The Governor of the time, Richard Bourke, saw Balcombe's appointment as part of the patronage given to the Balcombe family, after the death of William, Sen. With his work regarded as being unsatisfactory, only the intervention of his mother, saved him from dismissal in 1833, He was redeployed to surveying field work. This change allowed him to travel to various places in the colony. Surveyors were some of the few colonial settlers who visited areas of the colony where Aboriginal Australians were still living largely unaffected by the European settlers' encroachments onto traditional land.

Some sources state that Balcombe was on Thomas Mitchell's third expedition, in 1836, and that he later produced paintings that were made from sketches taken on this trip. However, he is not mentioned in Mitchell's account of the expedition, nor is he included in Mitchell's list of members of the expedition. There were numerous sketches made on the expedition—Mitchell mentions his making sketches in his account—some were later used as a basis for published engravings attributed to Mitchell.

By 1837, Balcombe had developed a reputation as an artist. Following his marriage in 1840, be began to work professionally as an artist. Over his career he would produce sketches, paintings, lithography and wax models. However, he retained his position at the Surveryor-General's department.

In 1844, had a studio 52 York Street, Sydney, opposite where the Lyceum Theatre once stood. Probably during his time as a mapmaker, Balcombe had learnt the craft of lithography. In 1844, Balcombe was involved in producing a set of hand-coloured lithographs of the Five Dock Grand Steeplechase, from original watercolour paintings by Edward Winstanley (1820–1849). Balcombe became known as a painter of animal subjects.

In 1848, he contributed pictures and eleven sculptures to an exhibition known as the Aboriginal Exhibition. This was at time when attitudes to Aboriginal Australians by settlers varied between violent hostility and romantic concepts of 'the noble savage'. Balcombe's pictures generally show Aboriginal Australians, in the activities of their normal daily life.

Stylistic similarities strongly suggest that Balcombe was the artist who signed their work 'T.B.'.

Balcombe visited the Turon area in the immediate aftermath of the first gold rush. He produced lithographs of the gold diggings from June 1851, and various images—a painting, lithograph, and woodcut—of Edward Hammond Hargraves. He illustrated a book, 'Gold Pen and Pencil Sketches or the Adventures of Mr John Slasher at the Turon gold diggings', with the text by 'G.F.P.' (George Ferrers Pickering), published in 1853. He also made a hand-coloured lithograph of the goldfield at Ophir, from the work of another sketcher, John Korff (1799—1870). A newspaper report in January 1852 stated that he was making sketches in the area around Sofala on the Turon River.

The Turon was in flood from, around 25 January 1852. Balcombe's brother, William, died at Mundy Point, on the Turon, aged 43, on 29 January 1852. He was on the other side of the Turon River, which due to its flow could not be forded, and Balcombe was unable to see his brother before he died. His brother had succumbed to dysentery, then an epidemic on the Turon diggings. Balcombe produced a melancholy sketch of a grave, generally believed to be his brother's grave. The death of his brother left Balcombe in great distress. In poor health himself, he left the Turon to return to Sydney, on 11 February 1852, one report stating, "His has indeed been a lamentable trip to the diggings. He is still a great invalid, and fortunately has secured a seat in a return cab".

His last known dated work is from 1857. He exhibited a wax model at the Sydney School of Arts, in March 1861, during the last year of his life.

== Gallery ==
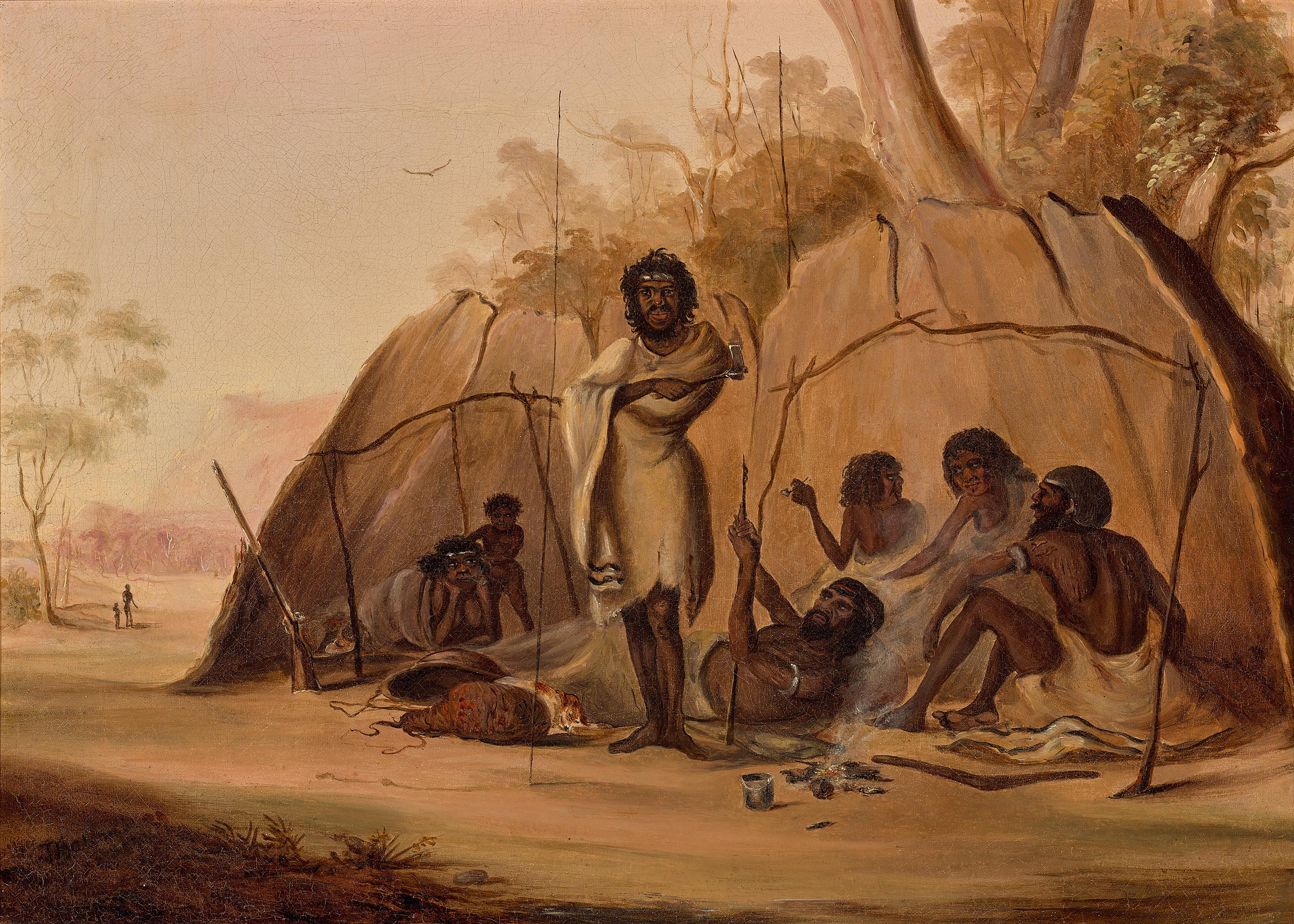
Encampment of Aboriginal Australians

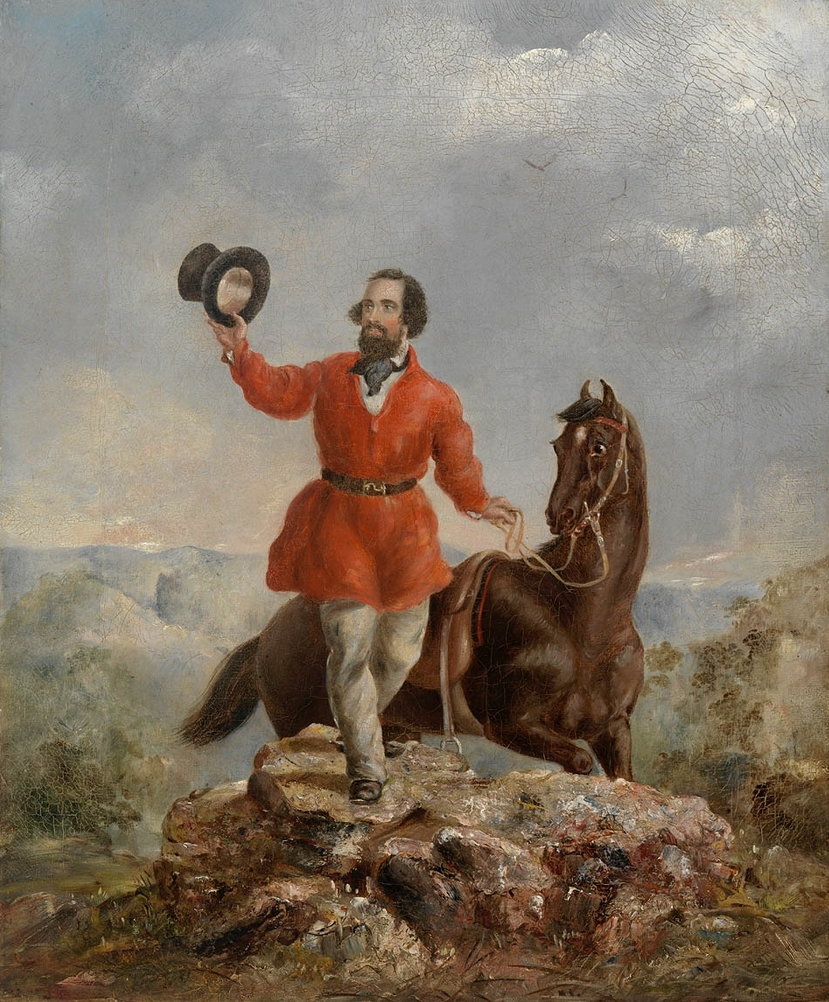
Fanciful representation of Hargraves returning salute of gold miners.

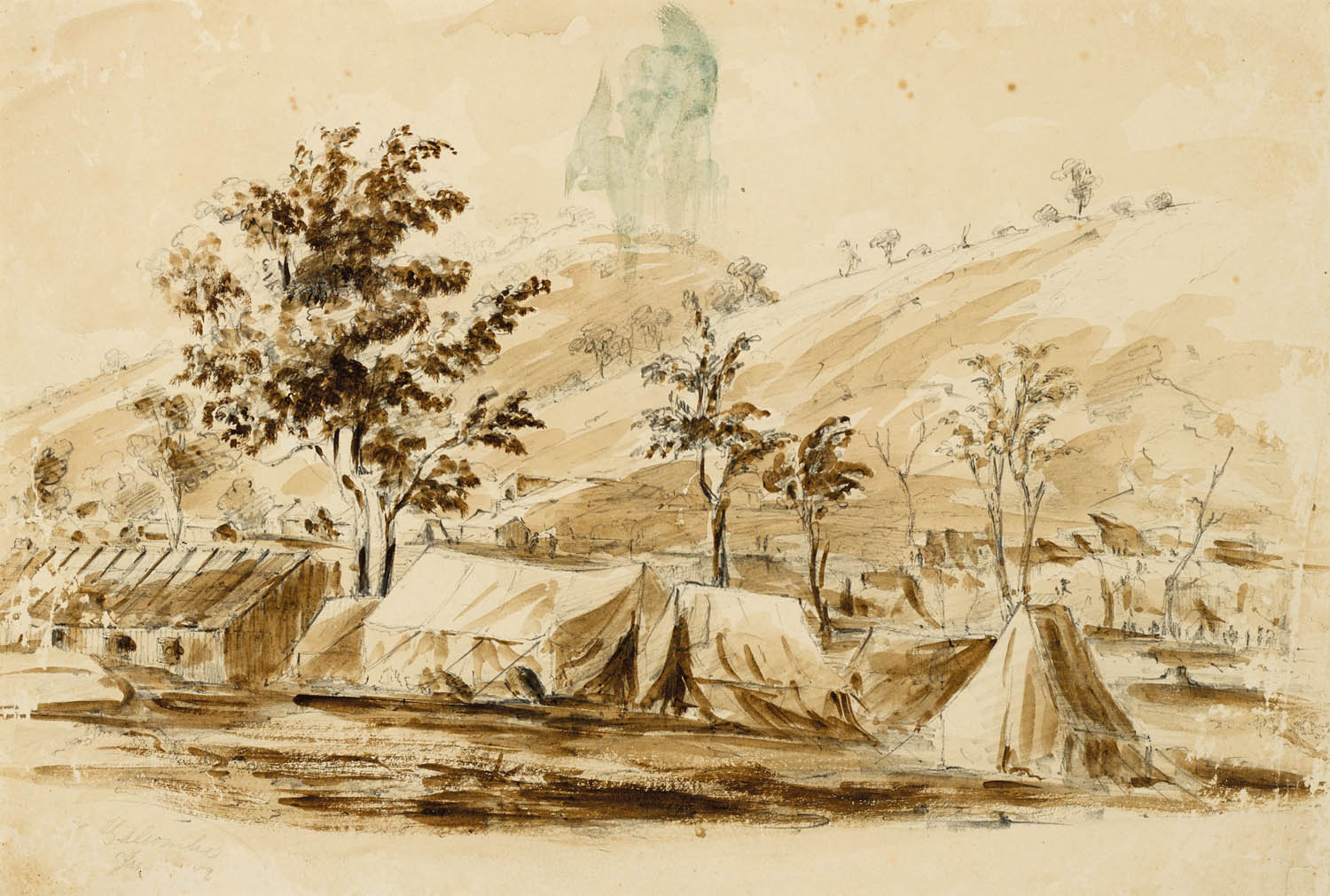
Mining camp (1851)

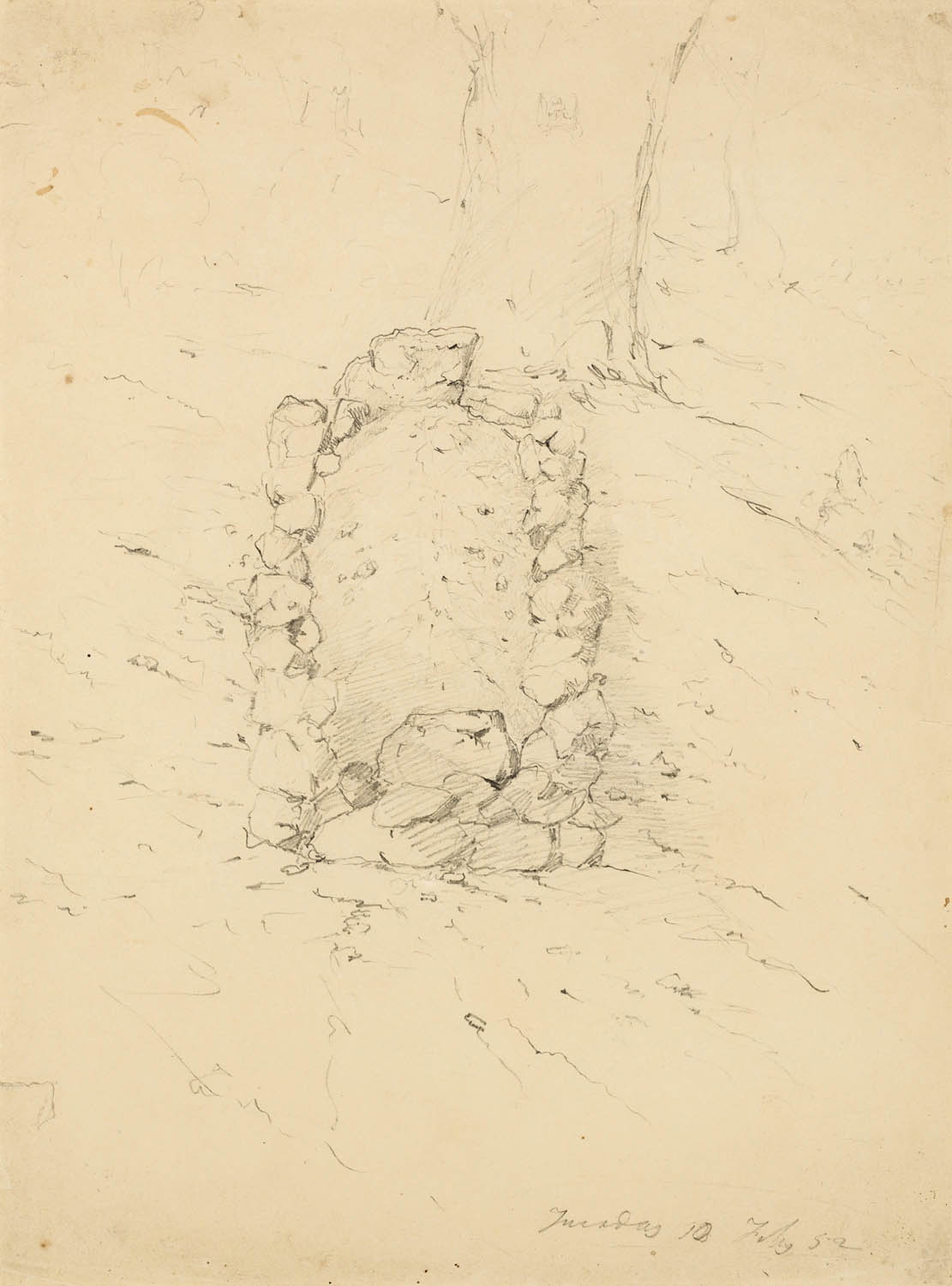
William's grave on the Turon.

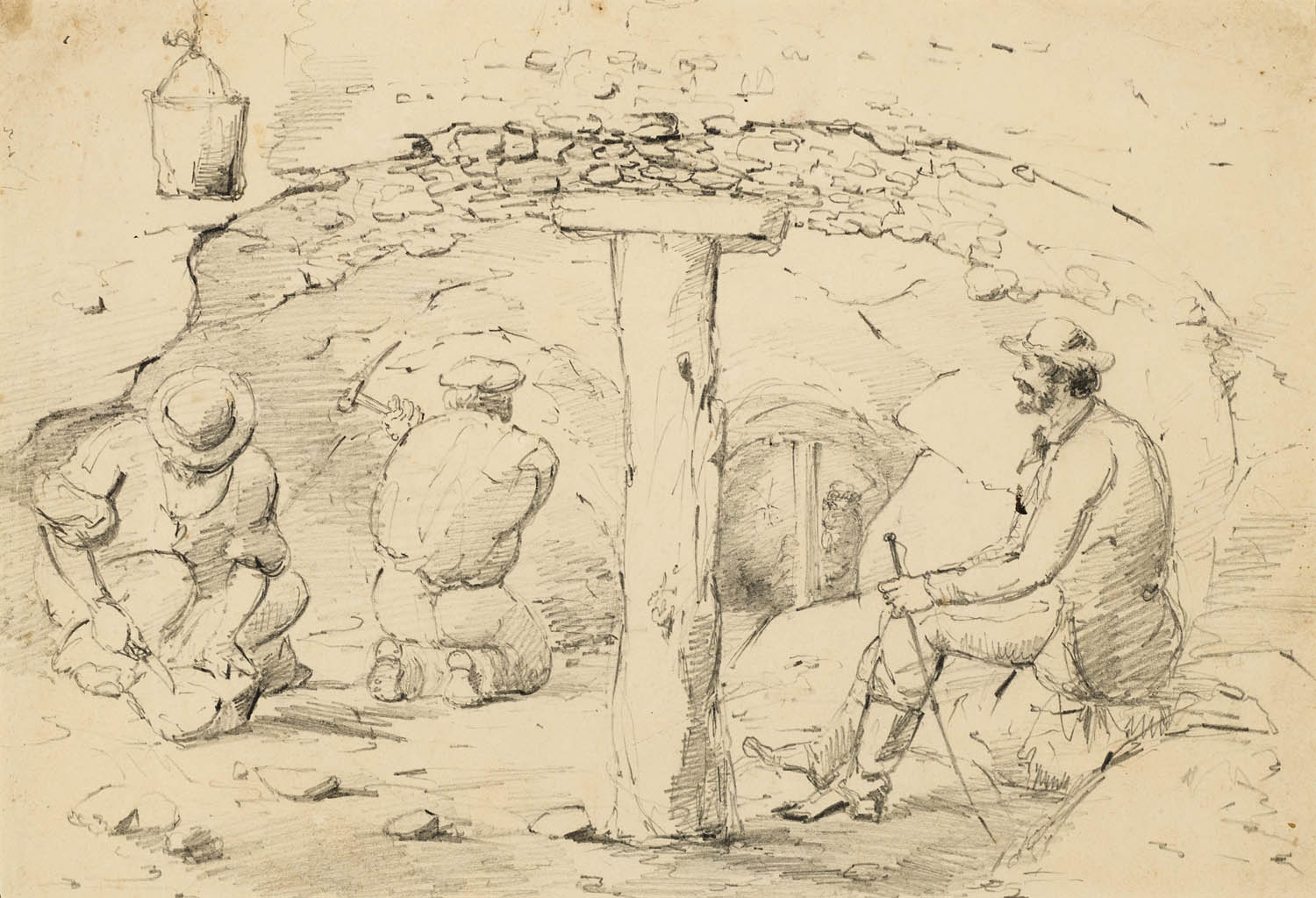
Pencil study of three men in a mine (1851)

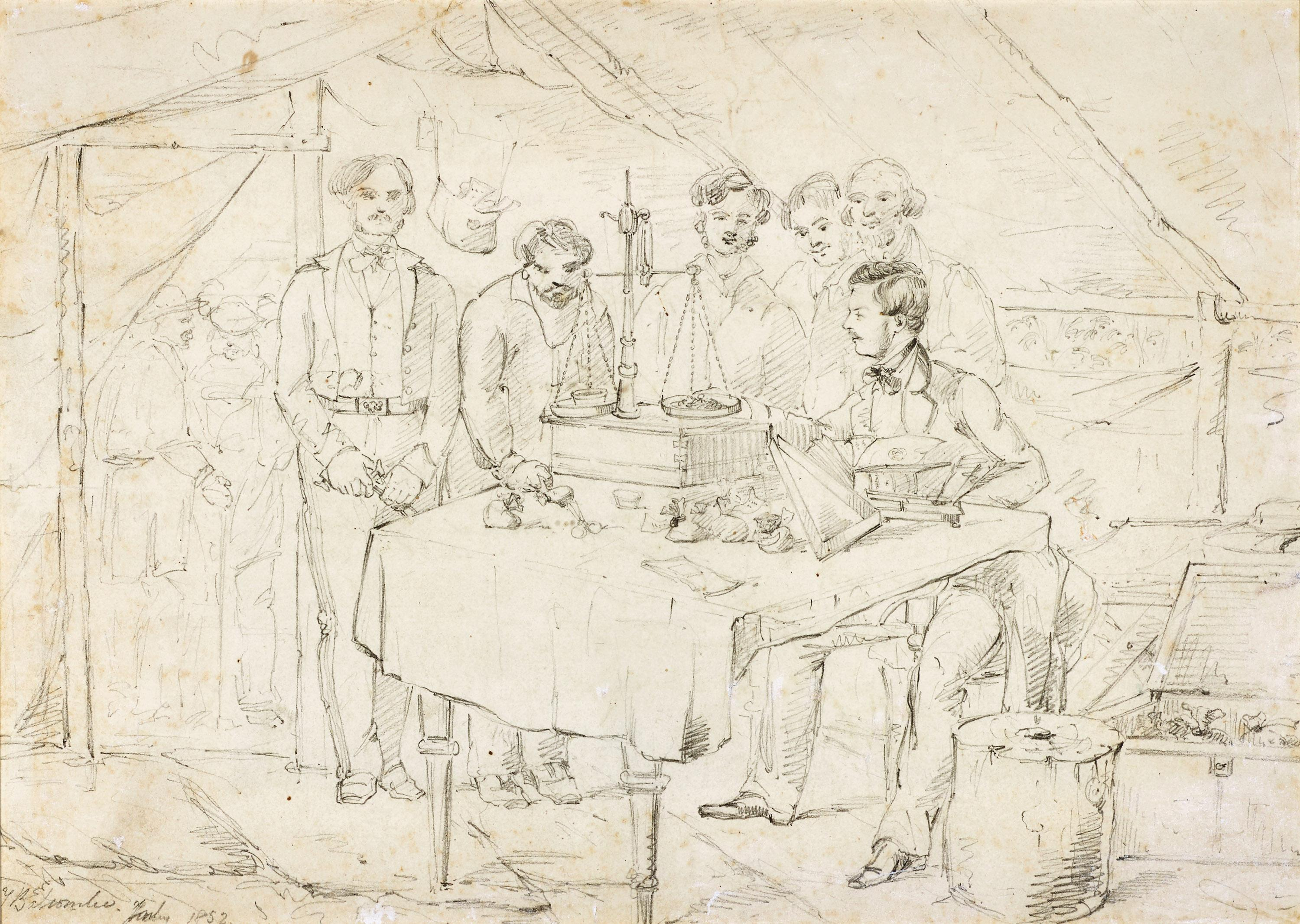
Alfred Delves Broughton weighing gold (c.1851)

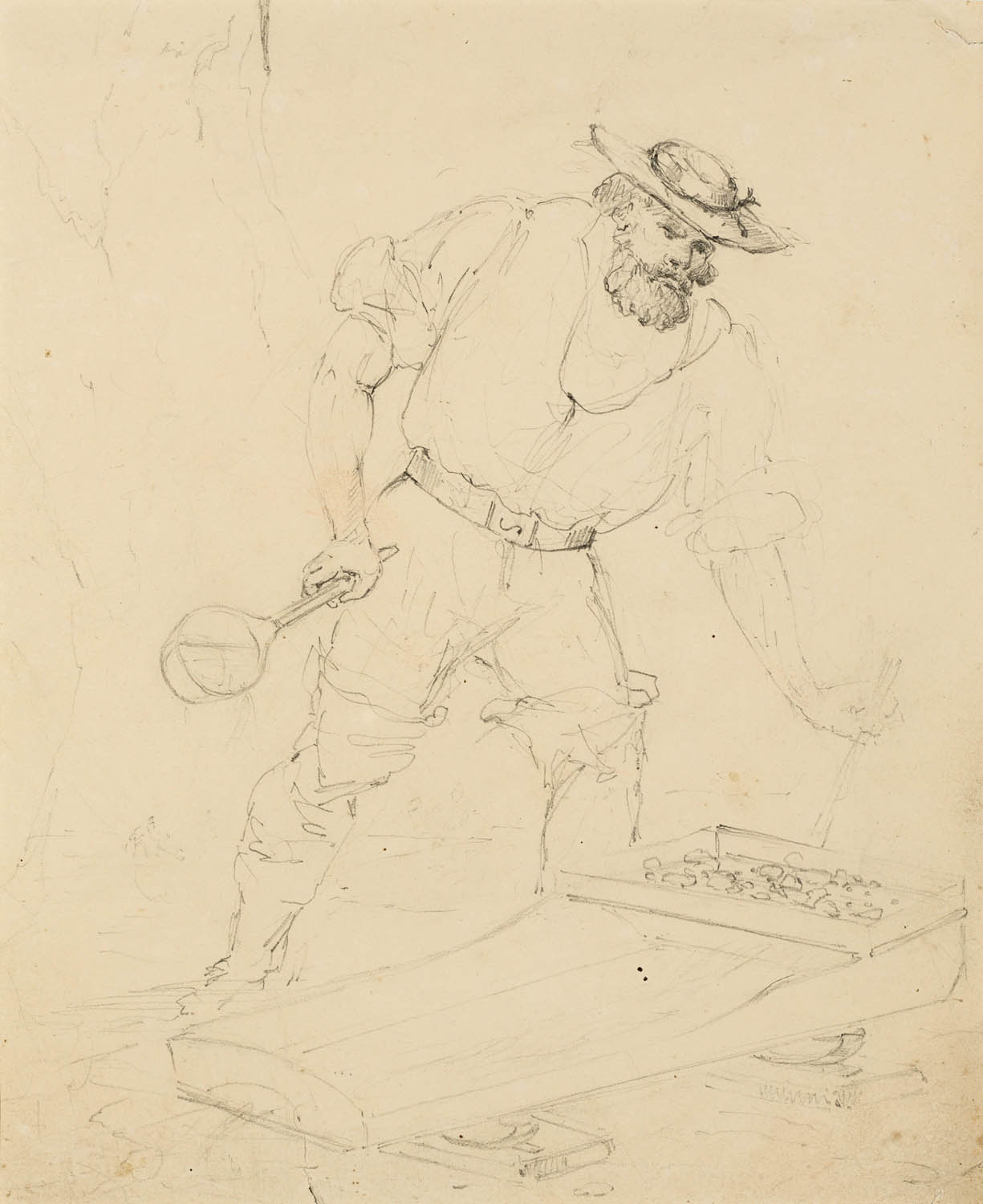
Miner with gold cradle.

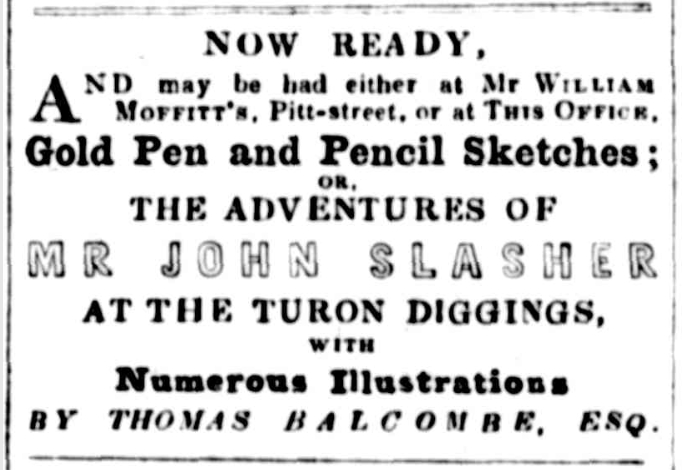
Advertisement 1852

== Family and later life ==
He married Lydia Elizabeth (nee Stuckey) (1820—1900), on 27 June 1840. They had four children; Jane Elizabeth Balcombe (1841—1858), Mary Newcombe Balcombe (1846—1917), Annie Rebbecca Chisholm Balcombe (1854—1922), and William Alexander Balcombe (1855—1939).

The death of his eldest daughter, Jane Eliza, in 1858, further affected Balcombe's increasingly precarious mental state. It was said that he never fully recovered from her death. At the inquest into his death, evidence was given that Balcombe was drinking, had "smitten" his wife, showed the signs of insanity much of the time, and had been prevented from attempting suicide. It seems that by the end of his life, he was working as a clerk and no longer active as an artist.

== Death, aftermath and legacy ==
Thomas Tyrwhitt Balcombe died by suicide, shooting himself in the head with a pistol, outside his home 'Napoleon Cottage', in Paddington, after 10 p.m. on the night of 13 October 1861. He was carried into his house. In the presence of his wife and a doctor, he died there after half an hour, without speaking. Letters that he left behind showed that the act was premeditated, and was, for him, related to his estrangement from his wife Lydia. The inquest into his death blamed "a fit of temporary insanity".

His remains lie in the cemetery of St Judes, Randwick, together with those of his daughter, Jane Eliza. His wife, Lydia, lived until 1900.

Many of his works are in the collections of the State Library of New South Wales. and the National Gallery of Australia. His works are still sought after by private collectors. Only three copies of the book that he illustrated, Gold Pen and Pencil Sketches or the Adventures of Mr John Slasher at the Turon gold diggings', are known to survive; one copy each being held at the University of Melbourne, Mitchell Library, and National Library of Australia. Along with his contemporary, S.T Gill, he left a visual record of life in the early years of the Australian gold rushes.

His son, William Alexander Balcombe, built yet another notable house called 'The Briars', at Wahroonga.

His great-grand-niece, Dame Mabel Balcombe Brookes (1890–1975), who was married to tennis player and Melbourne businessman, Norman Brookes (1877—1968), bought the original 'Briars' on St Helena, and presented it as a gift to the French nation in 1959.
