= Alarm Forest =

Coordinates: 15°56′52″S 5°42′14″W

- District
- Alarm Forest in Saint Helena
- Country: Saint Helena
- Established: 1987
- Seat: Briars

Population (2016)
  - Total: 383

Alarm Forest is the newest of the eight districts of the island of Saint Helena, part of the British Overseas Territory of Saint Helena, Ascension and Tristan da Cunha in the South Atlantic Ocean. It is located southeast of Jamestown, in the interior of the island, and is the only district to lack a coastline.

== Description ==
The terrain in the district is quite varied with steep ridges and a limited amount of flat ground, as befits the island's volcanic origin. The district was created in the early 1990s from parts of Jamestown and Longwood Districts. There is no settlement by that name, however, as it was named after the gun battery that used to be fired when unidentified ships were spotted. It includes the areas of The Briars, Seaview, Two Gun Saddle, Hunts Vale, and Alarm Hill. Alarm Forest is the only district that does not border the ocean. Its population has grown from 276 in 1998 to 289 in 2008 and 383 in 2016.

Alarm Forest is mostly a bedroom community for Jamestown or Longwood, as the only major places of employment in the district are the headquarters of Sure South Atlantic, with its large satellite dishes that connect Saint Helena to the outside world, and the St. Helena Distillery. The district lacks a community centre or a school, and the population looks to nearby Jamestown or Longwood for shopping and entertainment.

== History ==
Napoleon resided in the Briars, then in Jamestown, for several months in 1815 before being transferred to Longwood House. He had selected a spot in Sane Valley as his burial site during one of his walks, and his tomb was built there after his death in 1821. Napoleon was reburied in 1840 in Les Invalides in Paris. The French government later purchased the site of the tomb and commemorates his death there every year.
