= Betsy Balcombe =

British friend of Napoleon

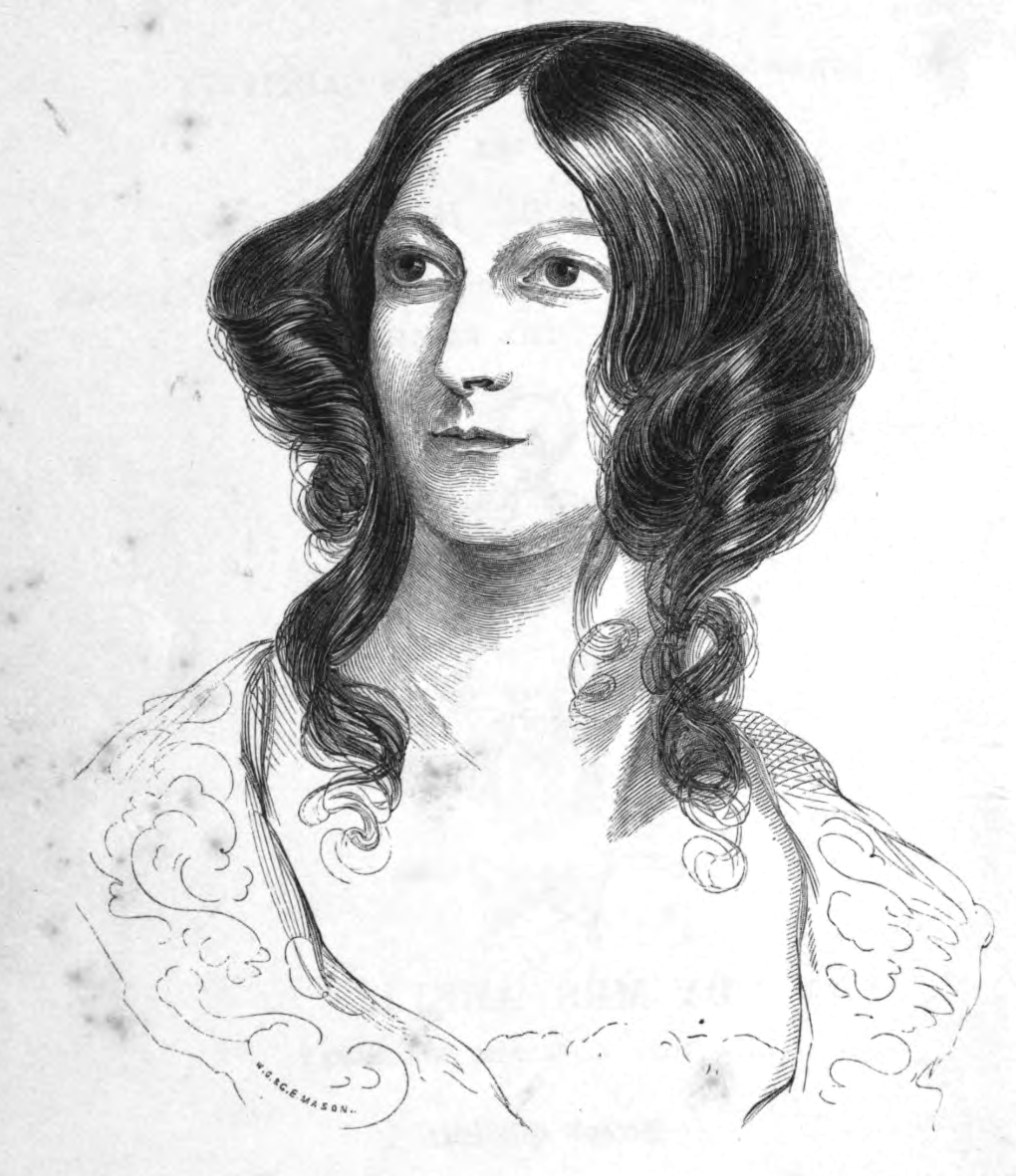
- 1845 depiction of Betsy Balcombe
- Born: Lucia Elizabeth Balcombe; 1 October 1802; United Kingdom
- Died: 29 June 1871 (aged 68–69); London, England
- Resting place: Kensal Green Cemetery, England
- Spouse: Edward Abell
- Writing career
- Genre: Memoirs
- Notable work: Recollections of the Emperor Napoleon during the first three years of his captivity on the island of St. Helena

Lucia Elizabeth Balcombe Abell (1802 − 29 June 1871) was a friend of Napoleon Bonaparte during his exile at Saint Helena. She was also an author and a landowner in New South Wales, Australia.

== Biography ==
Lucia Elizabeth Balcombe, commonly known as Betsy Balcombe, was born in 1802 as the second child of William and Jane Balcombe, née Cranston. Her father was Superintendent of Public Sales for the East India Company. Balcombe and her sister Jane, two years her senior, were educated in England. In 1814, the sisters returned to Saint Helena with their parents and two younger brothers. There they resided in a cottage called the Briars, where Napoléon Bonaparte was their guest during the first three months of his exile in Saint Helena.

In October 1815 Napoléon Bonaparte was exiled to Saint Helena by the British government. Because Napoleon's residence, Longwood House, had not yet been rehabilitated, he was housed in a pavilion near The Briars for the next two months. Although Balcombe was fearful of Bonaparte the first time they met, over time she and the emperor became friends. The French officers and servants were jealous of the young English girl, who addressed Napoleon as "Boney", without being reprimanded by him.

Balcombe often visited Napoleon after he was removed to Longwood House. The European press recognised the relationship between the 47-year-old Napoleon and the teenage girl and wrote about a love story. However, no evidence suggests anything romantic. In March 1818, the Balcombes left St Helena and went back to England. St Helena Governor Hudson Lowe disapproved of the friendship between the Balcombes and Napoleon, suspecting them of smuggling secret messages out of Longwood House.

In May 1822, Betsy Balcombe married Edward Abell and had a daughter, but the marriage soon failed. Balcombe earned money by teaching music. In 1824 she made a visit with her family to New South Wales, Australia, but returned to England soon after. In 1830 she returned to New South Wales with her brother William and together they took up a land grant adjoining their father's property near Bungonia.

Some years later she returned to London and in 1844 published a book, Recollections of Emperor Napoleon.

After further travels in France and Algeria, Betsy Abell died in London, on 29 June 1871, and was buried in Kensal Green Cemetery.

== Bibliography ==
- L. Abell (Mrs. Lucia Elizabeth Abell), Recollections of the Emperor Napoleon during the first three years of his captivity on the island of St. Helena. London: Murray, 1844
- Lucia Elizabeth Balcombe Abell: To Befriend an Emperor: Betsy Balcombe's Memoirs of Napoleon on St. Helena. Welwyn Garden City, UK: Ravenhill, 2005, ISBN 1-905043-03-1
- Anne Whitehead: Betsy and the Emperor: The True Story of Napoleon, a pretty girl, a Regency rake and an Australian colonial misadventure. Allen & Unwin, Sydney, 2015, ISBN 978-1-76011-293-6
- Thomas Costain, "The Last Love". Republished: Doubleday, 2000. A fictionalized story of the relationship between Napoleon and Betsy Balcombe and her family
- M. Brookes (1960). St. Helena story / Dame Mabel Brookes; with a foreword by R. G. Menzies. London; Melbourne: Heinemann

== In film and radio ==
- Napoléon is a 2002 historical TV miniseries exploring the life of Napoleon Bonaparte, based on Max Gallo's book Napoleon) of Napoleon's life. In the series, the 14-year-old Betsy Balcombe is played by Tamsin Egerton-Dick.
- Monsieur N. is a 2003 British-French film depicting Napoleon's life on St Helena, directed by Antoine de Caunes. Betsy Balcombe is played by Siobhan Hewlett.
- In 2005, BBC Radio 4 first broadcast the radio drama Betsy and Napoleon by Julia Blackburn in five parts. Based on contemporary accounts, it covers the two months Napoleon spent with the Balcombe family. It features Alex Jennings as Napoleon and Michelle Tate as Betsy, and was directed by Mary Ward Lowery.
- Ridley Scott's 2023 Napoleon is a historical movie based on Napoleon Bonaparte's life and his relationship with his first wife Josephine de Beuharnais. Betsy Balcombe is played by Olivia Juno Cleverley.

== See also ==
- Samantha Smith
- Sarah York
- William Balcombe (father)
- Thomas Trywritt Balcombe (brother)
