= Briars, Saint Helena =

Residence of Napoleon

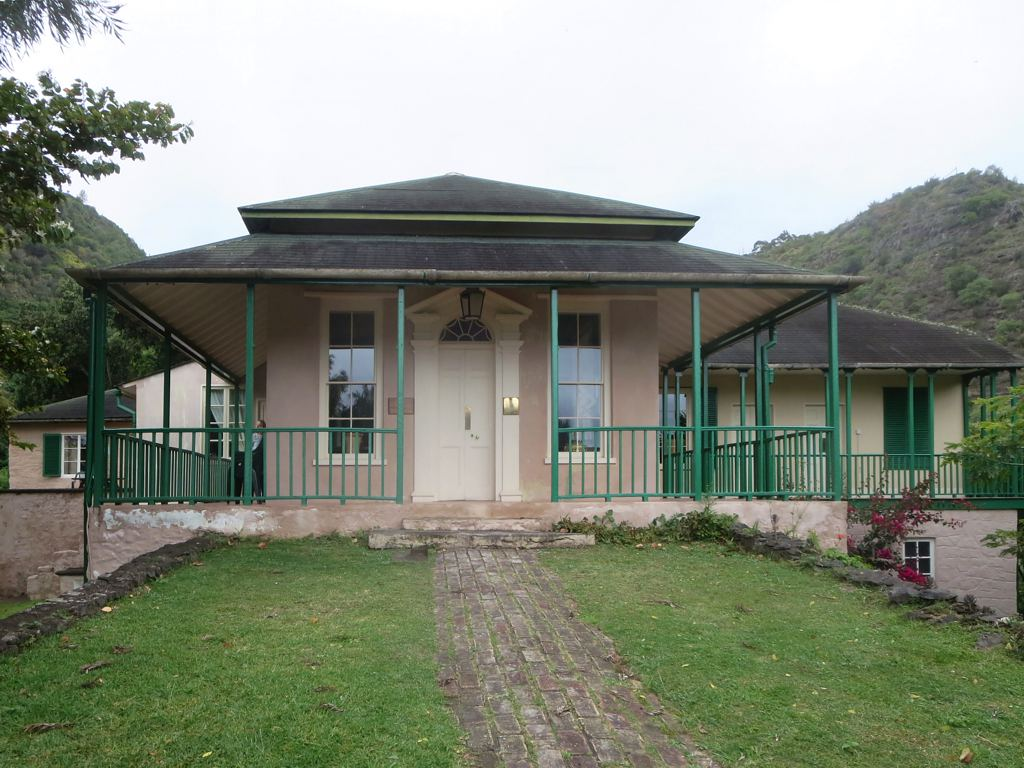
Briars Pavilion

Briars is the small pavilion in which Napoleon Bonaparte stayed for the first few weeks of his exile on Saint Helena in late 1815 before being moved to Longwood House.

The pavilion was in the garden of William Balcombe, an English merchant who became a purveyor to Napoleon. His 14-year-old daughter Elizabeth Lucia ("Betsy") Balcombe was the only family member who spoke French, and she became the family translator. Because of his family's closeness to Napoleon, Balcombe attracted the suspicion of Governor Hudson Lowe, and in 1818 he was forced to leave the island and return to England. The Briars was then used as the home for the admiral assigned to St Helena.

== History ==
By coincidence, the Duke of Wellington also stayed in The Briars, in 1805, on his return from a tour of duty in India. He wrote to the admiral commanding the garrison on 3 April 1816, "You may tell Bony that I find his apartments at the Elysée-Bourbon very convenient and that I hope he likes mine at the Balcombes." In 1827 the East India Company bought the property for £6,000 and used it for making silk and growing mulberry trees. In 1959 the Pavilion was purchased by Dame Mabel Brookes, a great granddaughter of William Balcombe, and donated to the French government, which appointed her as Chevalier de la Légion d'honneur in 1960 in recognition of her generous gesture. It became the third of the French properties on the island, together with his former tomb in Sane Valley and Longwood House.

Later, Balcombe was offered a post in Australia and established a new estate called "The Briars" in the Carwoola area of New South Wales. On this new estate, it is believed that he was responsible for introducing two plants to Australia, the Sweet Briar (Rosa rubiginosa) and the Weeping Willow (Salix babylonica). The willow grew nearby Napoleon's grave on St Helena and Balcombe is reported to have taken cuttings from these trees.

William's youngest son, Alexander Beatson Balcombe, named his pastoral run and homestead in Mount Martha "The Briars" (the run was previously known as Chen Chen Gurruck, or Tichingorourke). William's grandson, William Alexander Balcombe—son of Thomas Trywhitt Balcombe—built yet another notable house called 'The Briars', at Wahroonga.

== See also ==
- French domains of St Helena
- Alarm Forest
