= French domains of Saint Helena =

French estate on Saint Helena island

- French: Domaines français de Sainte-Hélène
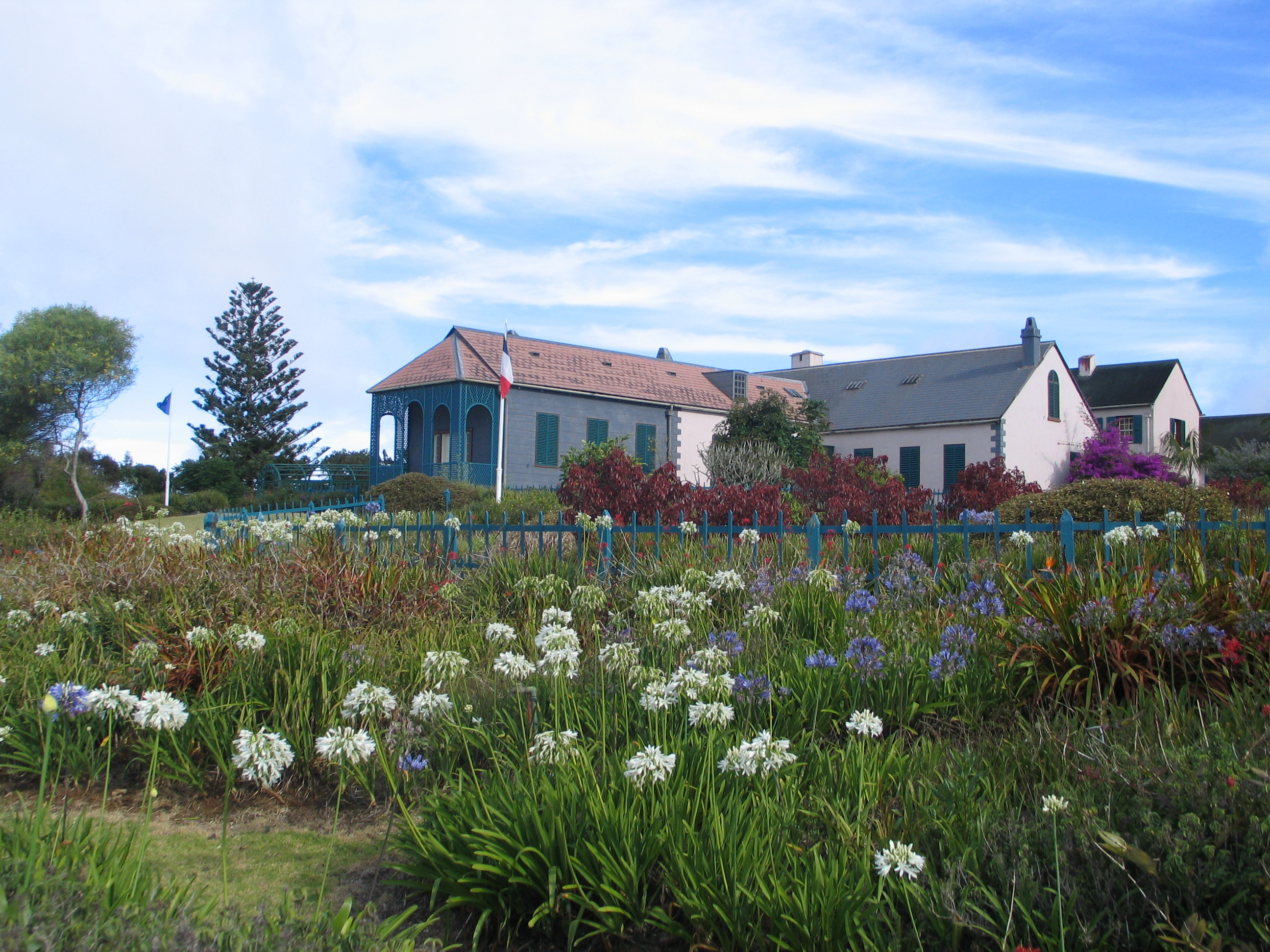
- Napoleon's House (Longwood House)
- Interactive map of French domains of Saint Helena
- Location: Saint Helena, Saint Helena, Ascension and Tristan da Cunha
- Nearest city: Jamestown, Saint Helena
- Area: 0.14 km^{2} (0.054 sq mi)
- Established: 1858
- Governing body: Saint Helena Napoleonic Heritage Ltd (management)

The French domains of Saint Helena (French: Domaines français de Sainte-Hélène, pronounced [dɔmɛn fʁɑ̃sɛ də sɛ̃t elɛn]) is an estate of 14 ha (35 acres or 0.14 km^{2}), in three separate parts, on the island of Saint Helena within the British Overseas Territory of Saint Helena, Ascension and Tristan da Cunha.

The three properties are owned by the Government of France via the Ministry of Foreign Affairs, and are administered by a non-profit company, Saint Helena Napoleonic Heritage Ltd, which undertakes their management and maintenance. These consist of:

- Longwood House
- The small pavilion Briars
- Valley of the Tomb

These places are connected with the exile of Napoleon in Saint Helena. They house a museum and displays on the life of the Emperor. Buildings have been restored as closely as possible to the state that they had in the Napoleonic period. They receive about 6,000 visitors annually. The Fondation Napoléon has supported the preservation of the sites, notably contributing to a €2.2 million restoration programme between 2010 and 2014.

From 2004, the French estate in Saint Helena was administratively under the representation of the consulate of France in Cape Town. They are run locally by a curator who is also honorary consul of France, since 1987 this has been Michel Dancoisne-Martineau.

A non-profit company, Saint Helena Napoleonic Heritage Ltd, was established in October 2015 to manage the French Domains of St Helena, created by the French Ministry of Foreign Affairs, the St Helena Government, and the Fondation Napoléon. The French State retains ownership of the properties and artworks.

== The detention of Napoleon ==
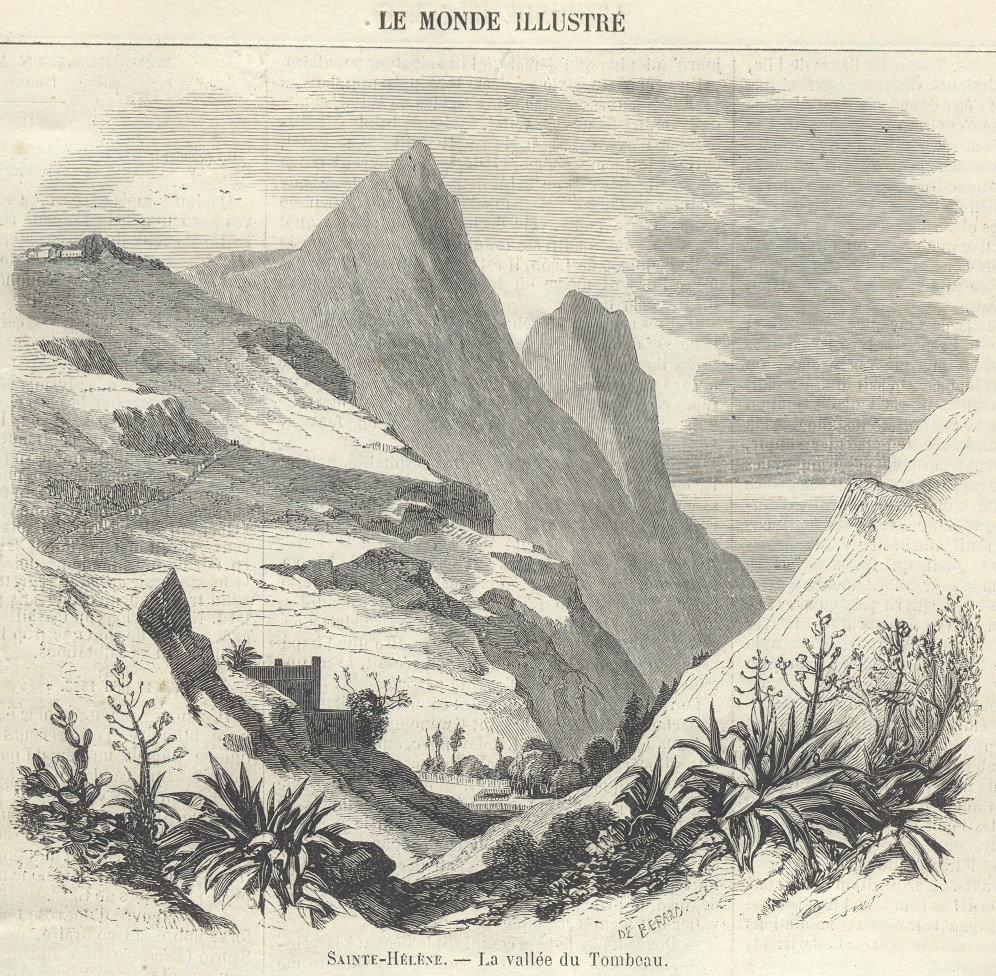
Sainte-Hélène - La vallée du Tombeau

Following his defeat at Waterloo, Napoleon was exiled and deported by the British to the island of Saint Helena, where he landed in 1815. Napoleon's arrival occasioned an increase of the population of the island: near 2,000 soldiers and 500 sailors of the war flotilla, as well as the officials of the British Government, accompanied by their families, not forgetting the small French colony which lived in the circle of acquaintances of Napoleon. Furthermore, the British, being afraid of a landing of French sailors to free the prisoner as at Elba, claimed Ascension Island - up to then uninhabited - to establish a naval garrison there.

Napoleon died on 5 May 1821. The next day, the governor of the island, Sir Hudson Lowe, although in perpetual conflict with his former prisoner, personally came to make sure of his death and declared then to his circle of acquaintances: He was England’s greatest enemy, and mine too, but I forgive him everything. On the death of a great man like him, we should feel only deep concern and regret.

In accordance with his last wishes, Napoleon was interred on 9 May 1821 near a spring, in what was then known as the Valley of the Geranium, but has since been called the "Valley of the Tomb ". On 27 May 1821, all the remaining French officials left the island. Nineteen years after Napoleon's death, King Louis-Philippe was able to obtain from the United Kingdom the return of remains of the ex-emperor. The exhumation of Napoleon's body took place on 15 October 1840; he was then repatriated to France and interred in the Invalides, in Paris.

From 1854, the Emperor Napoleon III negotiated with the British Government the purchase of Longwood House and of the valley of the Grave, which became French land properties in 1858, under the name of "French Domains of Saint-Helena". The small pavilion Briars, the Emperor's first house on the island, was added to the domain in 1959, when its last owner donated it to France.

== See also ==
- French colonial empire
- List of French possessions and colonies
