= William Balcombe =

Australian politician

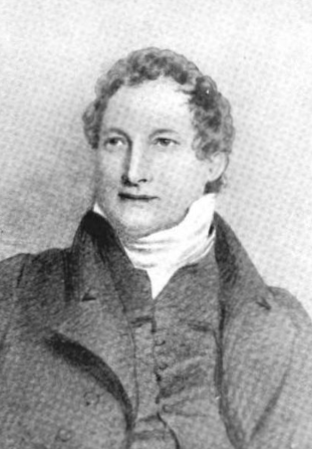
- Born: 28 December 1777; Rottingdean, Sussex, England
- Died: 19 March 1829 (aged 51); Sydney, New South Wales, Australia
- Burial place: Devonshire Street Cemetery, Sydney, New South Wales, Australia
- Military career
- Allegiance: United Kingdom; British East India Company; Colony of New South Wales
- Branch: Colonial Service

William Balcombe (28 December 1777 – 19 March 1829) was an East India Company and colonial administrator. He came to fame as the father of a daughter (Betsy Balcombe) who befriended Napoleon Bonaparte whilst the Balcombe family were living on Saint Helena. The exiled Bonaparte had lodged with the Balcombes (at the Briars) whilst his permanent quarters at Longwood were being prepared.

William Balcombe spent some time in the Colony of New South Wales appointed as the first treasurer, arriving on 5 April 1824 with his family and servants aboard the Hibernia. He died there in 1829 (aged 51). One of his sons was Thomas Tyrwhitt Balcombe (1810—1861) and a great-granddaughter was Mabel Brooks (1890—1975).

There is a long-held tradition that Balcombe brought cuttings of a weeping willow that grew over Napoleon's grave on St Helena to his property, Kenmore, near Goulburn. The same tradition holds that cuttings from the trees at Kenmore, and their descendants, were used to propagate the trees to other parts of New South Wales.

== Gallery ==
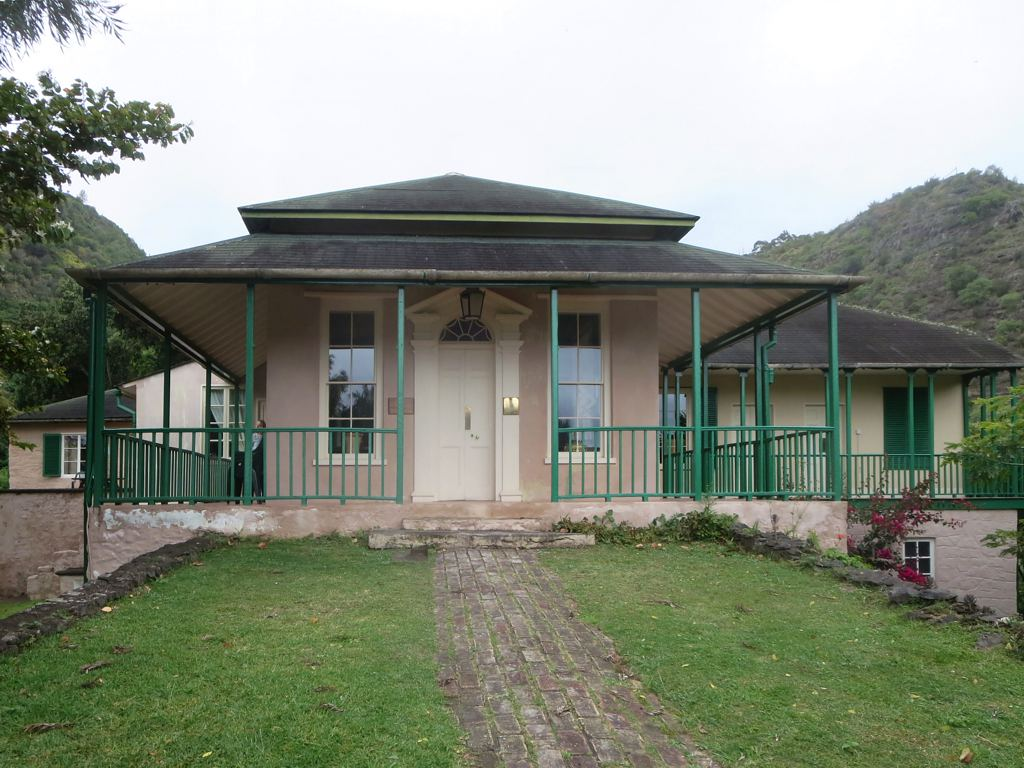
Napoleon Bonaparte spent his first two months of exile living in the Pavilion, on the Balcombe Briars Estate on St Helena.

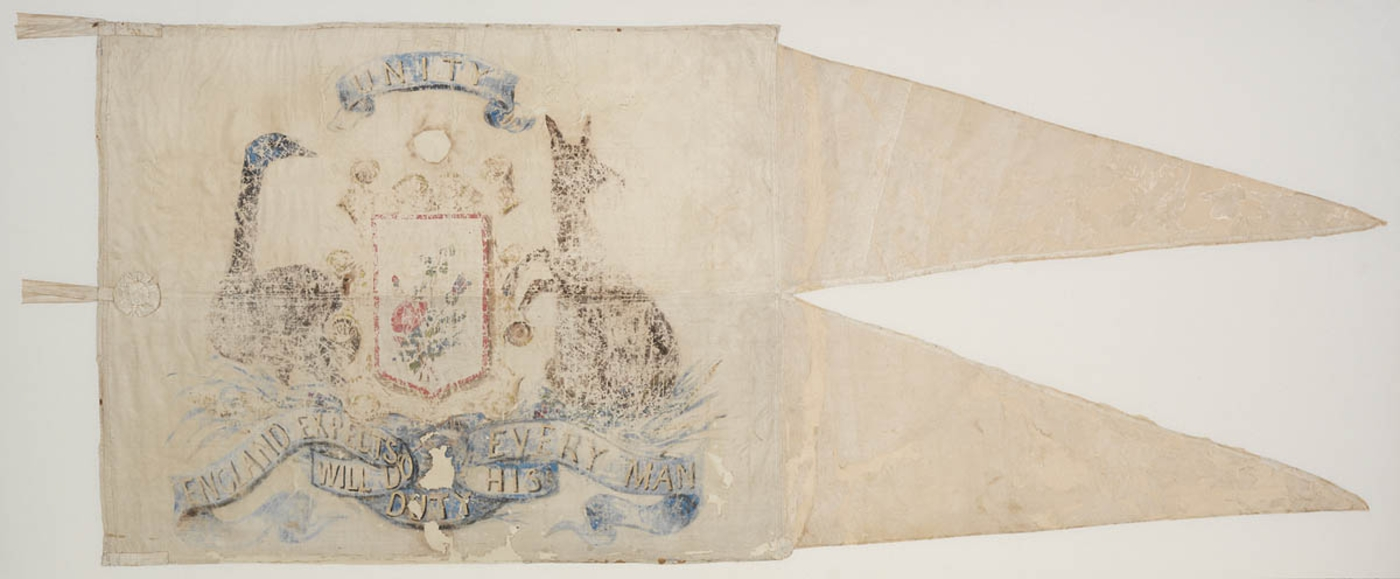
The painted silk flag with the 1806 emblem of the New South Wales colony

A modern rendition of the flag
