= The Briars, Wahroonga =

The Briars
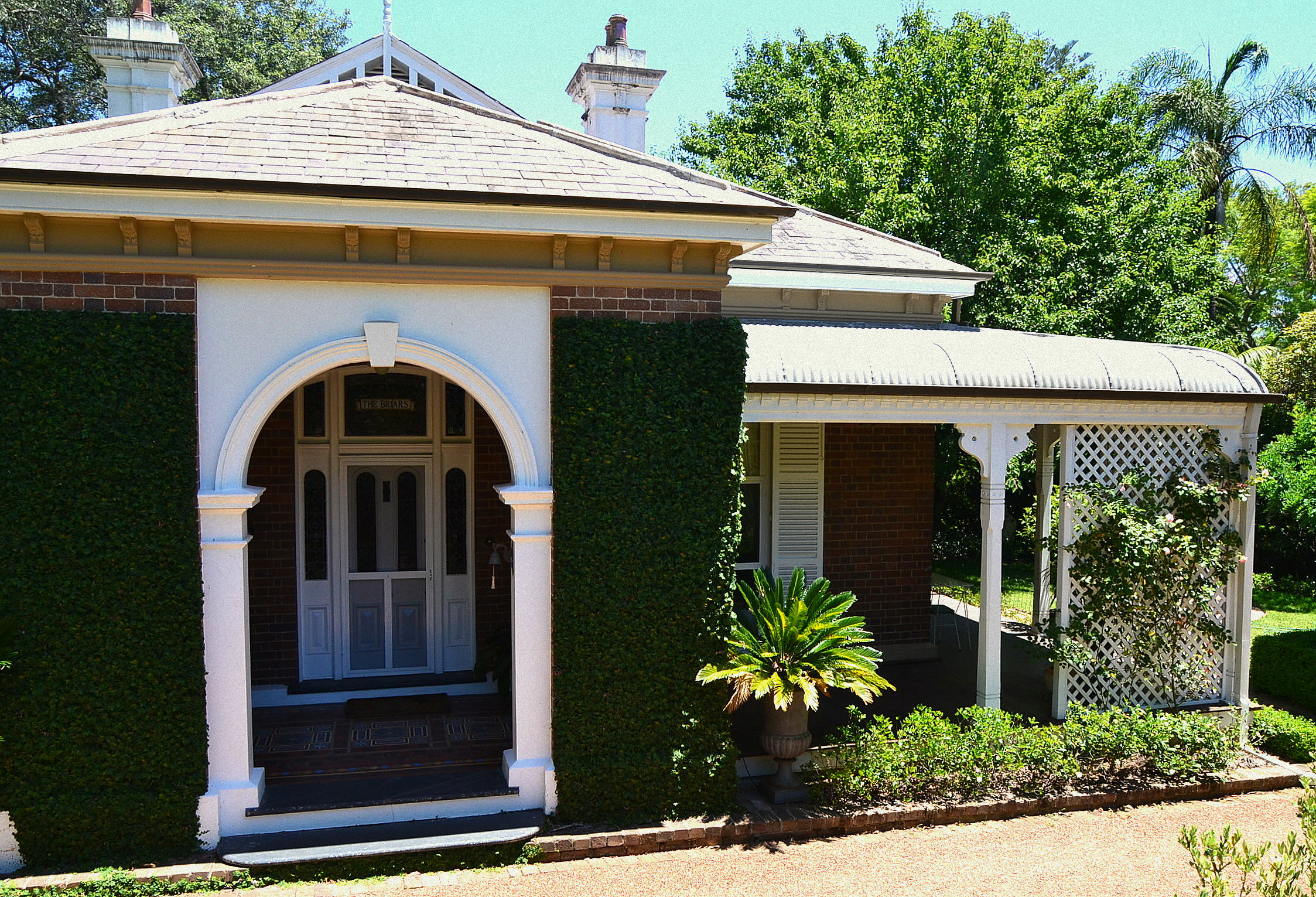
- The Briars in January 2013.

- Location within Sydney Location within Australia
- 33°43′02″S 151°06′48″E
- Location: 14 Woonona Avenue, Wahroonga, Ku-ring-gai Council, New South Wales, Australia

History
- Built: 1895
- Built for: William Alexander Balcombe

Site notes
- Architect: Charles H. Halstead

New South Wales Heritage Register
- Official name: The Briars
- Type: State heritage (built)
- Designated: 2 April 1999
- Reference no.: 274
- Type: House
- Category: Residential buildings (private)

The Briars is a heritage-listed residence located at 14 Woonona Avenue, in the Sydney suburb of Wahroonga, New South Wales, Australia. It was designed by Charles H. Halstead. It was added to the New South Wales State Heritage Register on 2 April 1999.

William Alexander Balcombe, for whom the house was built, was the grandson of William Balcombe (Snr) a Naval Agent and Purveyor for the East India Company on the island of St Helena during the exile of Napoleon Bonaparte on the island. The house is named, and has resemblance to, the building where Napoleon first stayed upon his arrival in St Helena.

== History ==
=== District history ===
Captain John Hunter and Captain Arthur Phillip led the first expeditions north of Sydney Cove into the tribal lands of the Gurringal soon after the landing of the first fleet, searching for suitable agricultural land and fresh water. Rock carvings are the only evidence of Aboriginal habitation. In 1896 a large expanse of bushland was reserved as parkland and named Ku-ring-gai Chase for the original inhabitants. This name was also adopted by the shire formed in 1906 and the municipality gazetted in 1928.

Millwood Farm on Blue Gum Creek was established in 1814 by a marine, Williarn Henry, the first white settler in the Ku-ring-gal area. In the 1820s ex-convict Joseph Fidden, a major force in the districts development, eventually became a ferryman after a brief attempt at farming. He rowed sawn timber from the government sawpits on the Lane Cove River to Sydney and dropped off supplies to settlements on his way home. The sly-grog and other facilities he provided at the infamous Fiddens Wharf attracted the rough-living sawyers and bushmen of the district.

Later Daniel Mathew established two sawmills, one at Clanville (Roseville) in 1825 and another at Rosedale (Pymble) in 1838. Most of sawyers moved on when the trees were felled, leaving cleared land for fanners and orchardists who followed. One was Robert Pymble who gave his name to the suburb where he established the first north shore orange orchard. Other early settlers were Richard Archbold at Roseville and Robert Pockley at Killara. The Lane Cove River was used to carry the produce to Sydney. The harbour barrier delayed the suburbanisation of the Ku-ring-gai district and in the early 1880s the tiny settlement was judged too small to warrant a railway line. Access to Milsons Point remained difficult although a coach service pliedthat route from 1881 to 1887. By 1885 it was also possible to travel to Sydney via the five bridges road crossing the water at Fig Tree, Gladesville, Iron Cove, Glebe Island and Pyrmont.

The single-track North Shore railway line that went from Hornsby to St Leonards in 1890 finally reached Milsons Point in 1893 where passenger and vehicular ferries completed the journey to the city. The North Shore Ferry Company had been carrying passengers from Milsons Point to Circular Quay since the 1860s and by the 1890s around 5 million people crossed the harbour by this means every year. Offering suburban subdivisions along the railway line in advance of the stations, speculators developed Ku-ring-gai well before completion of the North Shore Bridge in 1932 set off another flurry of real estate promotion. Ku-ring-gai grew slowly in the nineteenth century, its population being 4,000 by 1901. However, over the next two decades its population quadrupled. By this time, with its large residences in beautiful, leafy surrounds, it had changed from a district with a dubious reputation to one that attracted people of high socio-economic status, 73 per cent of whom were home owners.

During the interwar years of 1921 to 1933, the population increased by 45 per cent from 19,209 to 27,931 with a 68 per cent rise in the number of occupied dwellings, the proportion of brick to weatherboard being 5:1. The same sort of increase occurred from 1933 to 1947 when a further 43 per cent of people moved into the district bringing the total population to 39,874 and adding 3,564 houses. Even greater restriction on the use of timber and fibro occurred in this period so that 3,182 of these were brick. Clearly, Ku-ring-gai suffered less in the 1930s depression than other municipalities where development was much slower. Its people also encountered less unemployment - only slightly behind Vaucluse with 16 per cent unemployed, Ku-ring-gai and Mosman registered 18 per cent unemployed in 1933 - although the proportion of owner occupation did fall to 68 per cent.

=== The Briars ===
The Briars was built on land first granted to John Terry Hughes on 18 August 1842. Hughes' grant comprised 2,000 acres and was part of Portion 400A of the Parish of Gordon, County of Cumberland. After Hughes' death in 1851 the land was conveyed to a number of businessmen and land speculators who subdivided it into four major estates.

The Briars marks the first period of residential expansion in Wahroonga which followed the opening of the railway in 1890.

The Bundarra Estate was offered for sale in 1892. The estate stretched from the Pacific Highway (then known as Lane Cove Road) north across the North Shore Railway, lay west of Woonona Avenue and encompassed the properties on both sides of Bundarra Avenue. Jessie Edith Balcombe, wife of public servant William Alexander Balcombe (1855–1939) purchased lots 5, 6 and 16 of the Bundarra Estate on 14 April 1895 and built The Briars on Lot 16 in 1895, facing Woonona Avenue.

The Briars was designed in 1895 by architect Charles Herbert Halstead (1865–1941) for William Alexander Balcombe. Halstead is considered to be the architect for West Maling (1889), constructed in Penshurst. He was also the architect for the Old Science Building (1899) at Sydney Grammar School and was the architect for a number of church and public buildings in the southern suburbs of Sydney.

It was financed by a mortgage from William Henry Hargraves, Deputy Registrar in Equity (Balcombe's employer). Halstead was a young architect born and trained in England who migrated with his family to Australia. He practiced as an architect and a nurseryman from 1893 to 1912 and then again solely as an architect from 1912 until he ceased practice in about 1935.

Balcombe's uncle had formerly been Governor of St Helena – a volcanic island in the Southern Atlantic Ocean; it is believed that the house that he lived in on St Helena was also called The Briars and that this house was built to the same plan. Napoleon Bonaparte reputedly had lived in the Governor's house on St. Helena for some time after his exile to the island in 1815, while a permanent residence was being built for him.

William Alexander Balcombe was son of Thomas Tyrwhitt Balcombe, who worked for the Australian Agricultural Company at Port Stephens, and as a survey draftsman in Sydney for the Surveyor-General. William married Jessie Edith Griffen on 1 July 1884 at Raymond Terrace. He became Chief Clerk in Equity. William died at Hornsby in 1939. Jessie was still living in 1944. In 1903 the Electoral Roll recorded them both living at 14 Woonona Avenue, Wahroonga. Several historical records reveal that Napoleon was often seen playing with Balcombe children during his stay with the family.

The garden is much reduced by subdivision. In November 1924 Jessie Balcombe sold parts of Lots 5 & 6 (fronting Bundarra Avenue) subject to covenant and retained Lot 16 and the eastern parts of Lots 5 & 6. In 1935 she was listed as the sole proprietor of The Briars. By this time the estate had been reduced to 1 acre 2 roods and 29 1/2 perches in area and comprised Lot 16 and the eastern parts of Lots 5 & 6 which contained the stables and other essential outbuildings. The Great Depression hit the Balcombes hard as they were mortgaged to the Bank of Australasia from 1935 until 1941 and in 1941 Jessie sold The Briars to Winifred Laura Phipps, wife of Joseph John Flower Phipps of Chatswood, merchant. The Phipps continued to own the estate until 1949 when Lot A was sold to Nathaniel Joseph Victor Howes. Lot A comprised what is now known as no.s 12 and 14 Woonona Avenue and was the same as the original Lot 16 minus the two access driveways excised in 1959 to give access to Lots B and C which were the remnants of the original back paddocks of The Briars.

Howes owned The Briars until 1968 when it was sold to Ian and Judith Heydon of Wahroonga. As part of the process of selling The Briars, it appears that Howes subdivided the allotment into the two lots known today as 12 and 14 Woonona Avenue (containing the house of The Briars). The front block (12 Woonona Avenue) was built upon, with a single storey red brick home that obscured views of The Briars to its rear (north). The former tennis court (between Woonona Avenue and the Briars house's front door) was subdivided off and a single storey house built there (c. 1968).

The Briars' driveway (which led to the former stables on the house's west) (demolished) was subdivided off. There is now a steep bank along this western boundary. There is a line of coniferous trees about where a Himalayan cedar tree (Cedrus deodara) was (in a photograph of c. 1915 a 5–6-metre (16–20 ft) tall deodar/Himalayan cedar was to the west of the house, along with a giant bird-of-paradise flower (Strelitzia nicolai). Both are now gone). These were between what is now the garage and the boundary fence.

The creeping fig (Ficus pumila var.pumila) that covered the portico in 1915 was removed for a period and restored to the portico in the 1960s. An 8' high chain wire fence along the eastern boundary was erected in the 1960s (probably c. 1968). A c. 1915 photograph shows the house open to the tennis court, but with two flanking wire mesh fences (starting roughly at the house's outside walls') that appear to be climbing in height (presumably to stop tennis balls).

In 1972 the Heydons sympathetically renovated The Briars house. In 1983 the Heydons requested that a Permanent Conservation Order be placed over the property. Subdivision of former Briars estate (1990s?) was approved by Land & Environment Court (SEPP5) and 6 single storey villas were built adjoining the State Heritage Register boundary, on an adjacent block, while retaining a line of mature turpentines (Syncarpia glomulifera) on the drive to the house's (and one to 12 Woonona Avenue's south-west) west.

John and Elizabeth Fuller bought the property in 1999 when in poor condition, sympathetically renovating it further (over two years: Liu, 2015, 13) along with its garden. The garden has been planted in a more formal "compartmentalised" manner of garden "rooms" and one which seeks to screen by hedging adjacent development which has encroached on the property on all sides.

The c. 1968 house on its former tennis court at the front facing Woonona Avenue was demolished in 2009 and, after refusal in a NSW Land & Environment Court appeal, a modified application for a two-storey residential flat building was approved on 12 Woonona Avenue by the Ku-Ring-Gai Planning Panel in 12/2008. Construction proceeded there in 2009 to the extent of excavation and construction of the basement car park.

On 30 October 2009 Ku-Ring-Gai Council purchased this block for open space so that an appropriate visual curtilage could be reinstated for The Briars. In January 2010 Council filled and re-grassed the site (12 Woonona Avenue) as a small public park, thus restoring part of the "front" setting (and curtilage) of The Briars to Woonona Avenue, allowing it to be seen from there again.

The Fullers have opened their home to the National Trust of Australia (NSW) and their garden through Australia's Open Garden Scheme (now Open Gardens Australia). The property is now on the real estate market.

== Description ==
=== Setting ===
A large garden surrounds the house (although reduced by subdivision, notably of the former tennis court to its east and land to its south. From the east/ street the garden was (until its 2009 demolition) screened by a single storey 1950s house built on (the former) tennis court, however glimpses of large tree tops and very interesting chimney pots give hints of the garden within. A gravel carriageway into the "hatchet" shaped block (around a small park on what was previously the Briars' tennis court) is flanked with hedges, leading to the front door and around to the garage on the south side.

The house is faced with verandahs across the front (east) and down part of both sides (north/south). The sloping block is terraced level at the front and on both sides. On the north side an old cast iron fountain in a pond makes a focal point in the lawn. Steps behind (west of) the house lead down to the large back garden which is divided into several "garden rooms" varying from quite formal areas to very natural spaces.

=== Garden ===
The grounds while considerably reduced by subdivision retain several large turpentine trees (Syncarpia glomulifera) at the rear (west) of the site and a large English elm (Ulmus procera) in the north-eastern corner.

An interesting large garden surrounds the house. From the east/ street the garden is separated by a lot of and on which a c.1950s house was built and which was prior to that house's construction, The Briars' tennis court. This c. 1950s house was demolished in 2009. Glimpses of large tree tops and very interesting chimney pots give hints of the Briars' garden within. Over the past eight years the present owners have restored and developed the garden.

A gravel carriageway into the "hatchet" shaped block is flanked with photinia hedges under-planted with blue flowered Nile lily (Agapanthus orientalis). The drive leads to the front door and around to the garage on the south side of the house. Here old azaleas (Rhododendron indicum cv.s) line the edge of the veranda and near the back door an old white flowered camellia (C.japonica cv.) remains.

A pair of old cypress trees and a more recently planted lily pilly hedge line the southern boundary and an old jacaranda (J.mimosifolia) spreads in the south eastern corner of the property. The house is faced with verandahs across the front (east) and down part of both sides (north/south). On the north eastern corner of this verandah an old rose - "Pierre de Ronsard" weaves amongst the old trellis panels. The sloping block is terraced level at the front and on both sides.

On the north side an old cast iron fountain in a pond constructed from old bricks and filled with iris is a focal point in the lawn. The perimeter garden bed has box hedging and is planted out with bear's britches (Acanthus mollis), winter roses/ hellebores (Helleborus orientalis & H.Niger), windflowers (Anemone hupehensis cv.) etc.

Steps behind (west of) the house under a large tree fern (Dicksonia antarctica) lead down to the large back garden which is divided into several "garden rooms" varying from quite formal areas to very natural spaces. The area directly off the back porch (to the west) & outdoor living space features old brick paving and steps down to an area of lawn surrounded in part with contrasting twin hedges of box (Buxus sp.) and silver germander (Teucrium sp.) or with box only (in the shaded area). A large sandstone urn containing a variegated leafed star jasmine (Trachelospermum jasminoides 'Variegata') is placed on a plinth & creates a centre piece, the beds are planted with iceberg roses, agapanthus and ground covers.

Under a large old English elm (Ulmus procera) in the north-western corner of the garden the ground has been paved with white pebbles in a circle to reflect the canopy of the tree above, the surrounding beds are planted with magnolias, ferns, hydrangeas, gardenias and feature statuary.

In the backyard is an area where a group of large remnant turpentines grace the property, many natives including blueberry ash (Elaeocarpus reticulatus), birdsnest ferns (Asplenium australasicum), matt rush (Lomandra sp.) and river lily (Crinum pedunculatum), have been planted in the filtered light. Old bricks form meandering paths through these trees and from here glimpses & vistas of the formal parts of the backyard can be seen.

=== House ===
The Briars is a well-built house retaining a large proportion of the original fabric. Joinery, screenwork and hardware (fireplaces etc.) are all original (as of 1983). Many parts of the garden are in their original form. Twelve old turpentine trees (Syncarpia glomulifera) remain from one of the earliest stands (Heritage Branch).

The style is transitional between the late Victorian Italianate and Federation. It is a single storey brick house with a hipped slate roof. A projecting brick bay with three stuccoed arches marks the front entrance and intersects a timber framed verandah which surrounds the house on three sides. The verandah is decorated with timber brackets and dentillation. Shuttered French doors open onto the verandah from the principal rooms. Internally it retains much of its original joinery and fireplaces.

When Mr and Mrs Fuller purchased the property in 1998, it was in poor state of repairs. There were over 800 broken slates on the roof and no electricity in some rooms. Bathroom and kitchen were almost nonexistent. However, its splendid bones were intact. Carpet had concealed and protected tallow wood floors, now polished and oiled. The original fireplaces, doors, windows and ceiling roses were intact. Notice the servant bells on the side of the fireplaces. The drive follows the original carriage way around the front of the new development. the front entrance has its original tiles. The stained glass door is replicated at the end of the hallway. The owners have, so far as practicable, furnished the home with period or earlier furnishings. Hallway: As you enter, notice the collection of plates on the plate railing. On the right is a William IV rosewood "Banjo" Barometer, c. 1835. In the middle of the hallway is a Victorian burr walnut centre table, c. 1860. The longcase mahogany-veneered oak clock, c. 1780, is a family heirloom. At the end of the hallway is an Irish regency mahogany side table, c. 1860. Main bedroom: The mahogany queen-sized bedstead is William IV. The flame mahogany chest of drawers, the dressing table and the breakfront wardrobe are all Victorian pieces. The patchwork bed covering was made by Mrs Fuller to tone with the curtains. Here you see one of the many original fireplaces.

Second bedroom: Notice the original cast iron ceiling rose and tongue and grooved ceiling. The crocheted bedspread was made by Mr Fuller's mother. The three door cedar wardrobe is mid-Victorian. The wall-mirror is late Victorian and is a family piece. Library: Again, notice the original cast iron rose and the tongue and grooved ceiling. The mahogany revolving drum table is Victorian. the French walnut bookcase, c. 1880, is an early example of prefabricated furniture. the Victorian ebonized walnut card table is a family piece. Third bedroom: The wardrobe is Australian cedar, c. 1880. The distinguished gentleman in the picture is a great, great uncle. Dining room: This elegant room has a splendid fireplace. On the mantle piece is a French clock. the clock and the small statue of Napoleon is a reminder of the Emperor's connection with the Balcombe family. On the William IV breakfast pedestal sideboard are pieces of family silver and an early blue and white set of Meissan cups, saucers and eggcups. The Victorian table and chairs are mahogany. A handsome tantalus rests on a Victorian chiffonier. The pig pot is from Papua New Guinea, where the Fullers lived in the early 1980s. Formal Sitting Rom: The furniture is mainly early Victorian mahogany. The small chiffonier is c. 1840. Many of the china pieces and family heirlooms. Note the tea caddy has its original crystal bowl. The small (Chinese) Cabinet is Victorian and has been in the family for over 100 years. Study: The ceiling is a mystery. The Colonial cedar bookcase and the Victorian Mahogany desk feature. Family Sitting Room: Over a c. 1820 pine dresser is a story board from the Sepik River area in Papua New Guinea. Morning room: Note the prints of paintings by Thomas Balcombe and a recent photo of The Briars on St Helena. The early photos of The Briars date from c. 1915. The Verandah: Has some of its original posts and the beam that supports the verandah, you can see the new development emerging in the south western corner of the Briars. Note the original chimney pots with fans on the roof. The Garden: The owners found a jungle when they bought the property; some sixty trips to the rubbish tip were needed to clear the property. However, a number of old trees and shrubs were retained. The tall turpentine trees are remnants of the natural vegetation, The pathway through the forest leading to the stables was uncovered. In 2006 and 2007, the garden was open under the Australian Open Garden Scheme attracting over 600 visitors.

=== Condition ===
As at 8 August 2016, the house is in good condition and has been sympathetically renovated by its present owners. Joinery, screenwork and hardware (fireplaces etc.) are all original (as of 1983). Many parts of the garden are in their original form. Twelve old turpentine trees (Syncarpia glomulifera) remain from one of the earliest stands.

=== Modifications and dates ===
- c.1940–50 Subdivision of former tennis court to front (south) of the house, erection of another single storey house there.
- 1968 subdivision of the former tennis court to front (south) and erection of single storey house.
- 1983 Sympathetically restored by then owners, then in good condition (1983). Substantially intact.
- 26 October 1999 alterations and additions - demolished unauthorised 1970s rear deck and enclosing walls, conservatory. Demolished 1920s internal bathroom and external toilet. Reinstated windows in rear wall of house. Constructed new verandah to match existing details. Fitted out existing spaces as bathroom, laundry and kitchen. Constructed new garage and connecting breezeway. Repaired existing timber verandah.

Prior to that date the same owners had replaced verandah posts with careful replication of former details, and other "substantial" restoration works.

- 2001 Land on The Briars' southern boundary (part of the former Briars'estate ) was developed under SEPP 5 planning provisions resulting in the construction of 5 single storey townhouses ( closest to The Briars) and 2 two storey townhouses further away.
- 2002 4 single storey townhouses and 2 two storey townhouses were constructed close to the northern boundary of The Briars pursuant to SEPP 5 planning provisions.
- 2007 The Land and Environment Court reduced the height of a 5-storey unit development on the south-western boundary of The Briars (on the Briars former stables area) to 3 storeys to prevent the development from dominating the garden of The Briars.
- In 2008, The Land and Environment Court refused an application for a 3-storey townhouse development on 12 Woonona Ave, adjacent to The Briars on its northern boundary (the old Briars tennis court). In late 2008, The Ku-ring-gai Planning Panel approved a modified 3 storey town house development on 12 Woonona Ave. In late 2009, Ku-ring-gai Municipal Council acquired 12 Woonona Ave to create a public park The council has since grassed the site and has prepared concept landscaping plans for the embellishment of the park.
- 2009 Old conifers (Bhutan cypress, Cupressus torulosa) removed.
- 2009 Land & Environment Court refused an application for a two-storey residence on 12 Woonona Avenue adjacent. Ku-Ring Gai Planning Panel approved a modified application for two storey development on the same lot. The c. 1950s house has been demolished (2009).
- 2010 Ku-Ring-Gai Municipal Council have since acquired 12 Woonona Avenue and grassed the site as a public park (8/1/2010). Council have since grassed the park and is proposing to name it Balcombe Park (12/2010).

== Heritage listing ==
As at 15 February 2011, The Briars has state heritage significance for its historic, cultural, archaeological and aesthetic values. It is a good example of a transitional late Victorian/early Federation architectural style house. It is a prime example of the style of development prevalent in the local area at the turn of the 20th century. Historically it is significant as it represents the first period of residential expansion in Wahroonga which followed the opening of the railway in 1890.

The Briars is associated with:

William Alexander Balcombe, who built The Briars in Wahroonga, was the grandson of William Balcombe (Snr) who was Naval Agent and Purveyor for the East India Company on the island of St Helena in the South Atlantic during the exile of Napoleon Bonaparte on the island. His uncle was briefly associated with Napoleon Bonaparte during his period of exile on the island of St. Helena. Bonaparte was incarcerated there on the 15 October 1815 after his defeat at the Battle of Waterloo. Whilst his accommodation at Longwood was made more habitable, he lived with the Balcombes at their home on St Helena, The Briars. More particularly, he lived in the Pavilion on the Briars' Estate, which still remains today. William Alexander's father, Thomas Tyrwhitt Balcombe was born on St Helena on 15 June 1810. There are reports in a number of history books that Napoleon was often seen playing with the Balcombe children during his stay with the Family.

William Balcombe (Snr) eventually emigrated to New South Wales where he became the first Colonial Treasurer. Thomas became a well known Colonial artist and many of his works can be seen in the Mitchell Library. The Balcombes had a family tradition of naming their houses The Briars. The house on St Helena was The Briars and the pavilion on the estate where Napoleon stayed has an obvious similarity in overall form to The Briars at Wahroonga. There is also a house at Mornington, Victoria that was built by Thomas's brother, Alexander Beatson Balcombe called The Briars. The similarity in design of the 1860 additions to the house in Mornington to that of The Briars at Wahroonga and the pavilion on St Helena are obvious.

The Briars was listed on the New South Wales State Heritage Register on 2 April 1999.

== See also ==
- Australian residential architectural styles
