= Voyennes =

- Commune
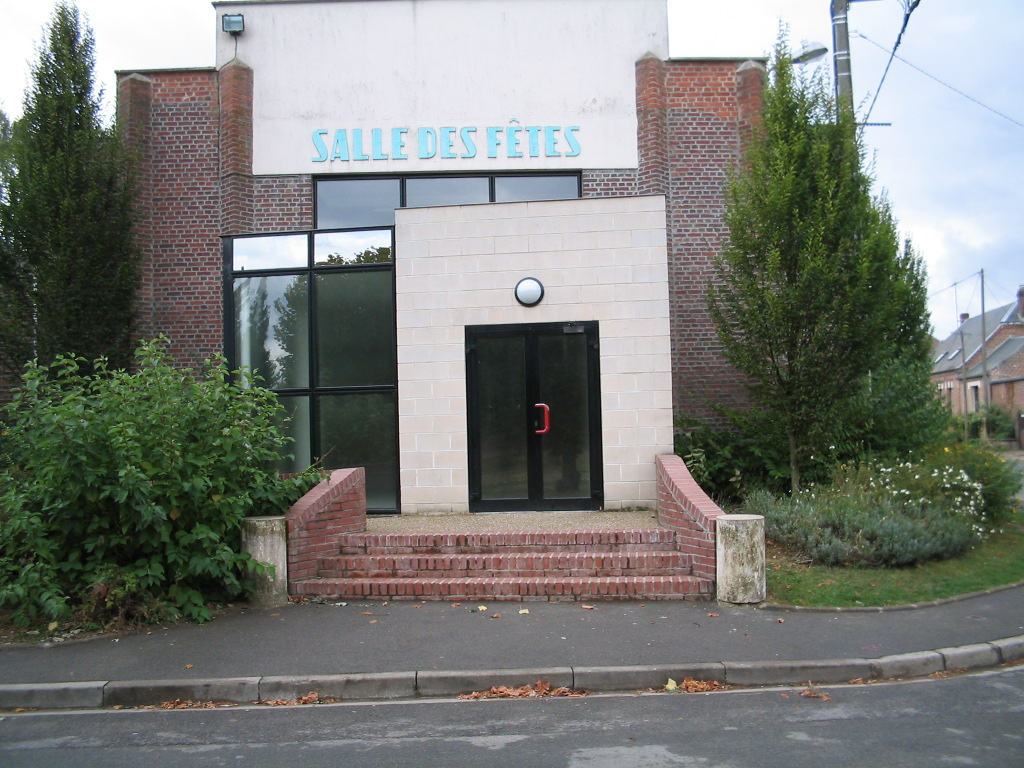
- Town recreation hall
- Location of Voyennes
- Location within France Location within Hauts-de-France
- Coordinates: 49°46′21″N 2°59′03″E
- Country: France
- Region: Hauts-de-France
- Department: Somme
- Arrondissement: Péronne
- Canton: Ham
- Intercommunality: Est de la Somme

Government
  - Mayor (2020–2026): Jean-Pierre Lemaître
- Area^{1}: 8.87 km^{2} (3.42 sq mi)
- Elevation: 62 m (203 ft)
- Highest elevation: 77 m (253 ft)
- Lowest elevation: 52 m (171 ft)
- Population (2023): 595
  - Density: 67.1/km^{2} (174/sq mi)
- Time zone: UTC+01:00 (CET)
  - Summer (DST): UTC+02:00 (CEST)
- INSEE/Postal code: 80811 /80400
- ^{1} French Land Register data, which excludes lakes, ponds, glaciers > 1 km^{2} (0.386 sq mi or 247 acres) and river estuaries.

Voyennes is a commune in the Somme department in Hauts-de-France in northern France.

== Geography ==
Voyennes is situated 30 miles(48 km) west of Amiens, on the D417 road in the valley of the Somme.

== History ==
On 19 October 1415, portions of the army of King Henry V of England crossed the Somme at Voyennes at an undefended causeway, a few days before the Battle of Agincourt.

== Population ==
Historical population
Year	Pop.	±% p.a.
1968	551	—
1975	562	+0.28%
1982	636	+1.78%
1990	619	−0.34%
1999	592	−0.49%
2007	592	+0.00%
2012	618	+0.86%
2017	603	−0.49%
2023	595	−0.22%
Source: INSEE

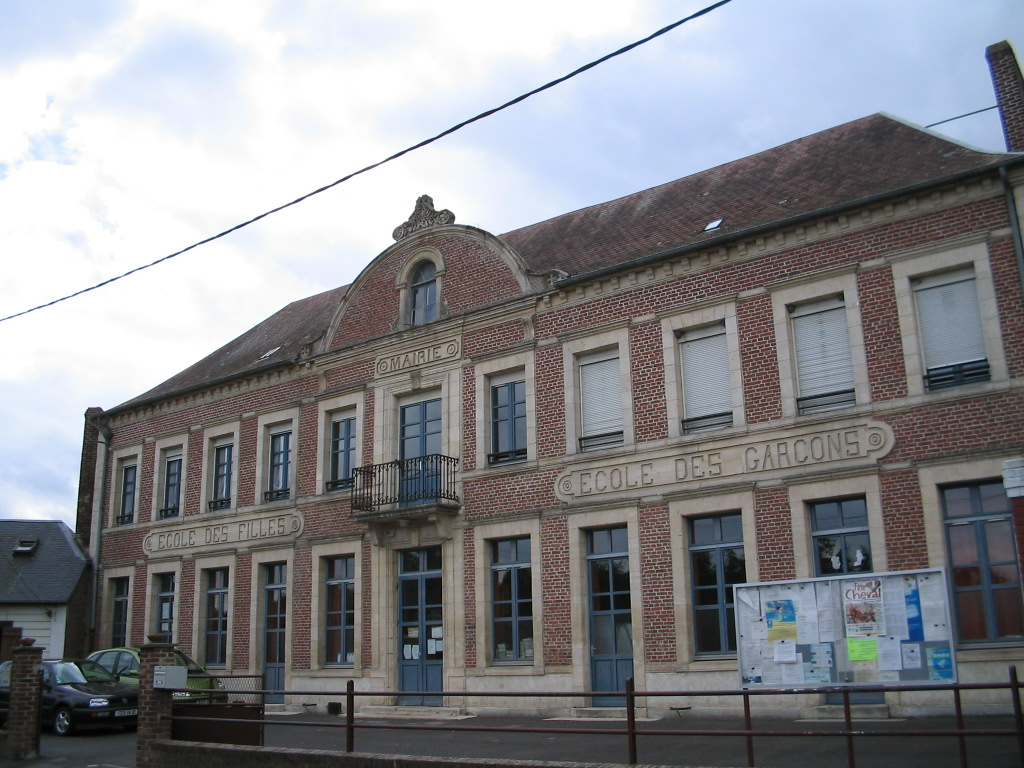
Voyennes school and mayor's office

== See also ==
- Communes of the Somme department
