= Longwood House =

Residence of Napoleon Bonaparte on Saint Helena

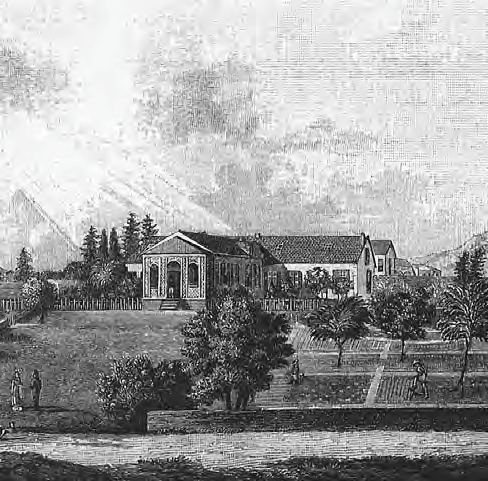
- Longwood was Napoleon's residence on Saint Helena from December 1815 until his death in May 1821.

- Location within Atlantic Ocean

General information
- Status: Museum
- Type: Residence
- Location: Longwood, Saint Helena
- Coordinates: 15°57′00″S 5°40′59″W
- Current tenants: Government of France
- Construction started: 18th century (as East India Company farm)
- Renovated: 20th century
- Owner: French Ministry for Europe and Foreign Affairs

Design and construction
- Known for: Final residence of Napoleon Bonaparte

Website
- sthelenaisland.info/longwood-house/

Longwood House is a mansion on the British overseas territory island of Saint Helena. It was the final residence of Napoleon Bonaparte, the former Emperor of the French, during his exile on the island of Saint Helena, from 10 December 1815 until his death on 5 May 1821. Originally an East India Company farm, it was later acquired by the Government of France and now operates as a museum.

== History ==
Longwood "was originally a farm belonging to the East India Company and was afterwards given as a country residence to the Deputy-Governor." It was converted for the use of Napoleon in 1815. The British government eventually recognized its inadequacy as a home for the former emperor and his entourage and, by the time of his death, had built a new house for him nearby, which he never occupied. In February 1818, Governor Sir Hudson Lowe proposed to Lord Bathurst to move Napoleon to Rosemary Hall, a house that became available and was located in a more hospitable part of the island, sheltered from the winds and shaded, as Napoleon had preferred. But the revelations of General Gourgaud in London brought Lord Bathurst to the opinion that it was safer to keep Napoleon at Longwood, where an escape was harder to undertake. The building of the new house only began in October 1818, three years after Napoleon's arrival on the island.

The will written by Napoleon at Longwood House is preserved in French National Archives.

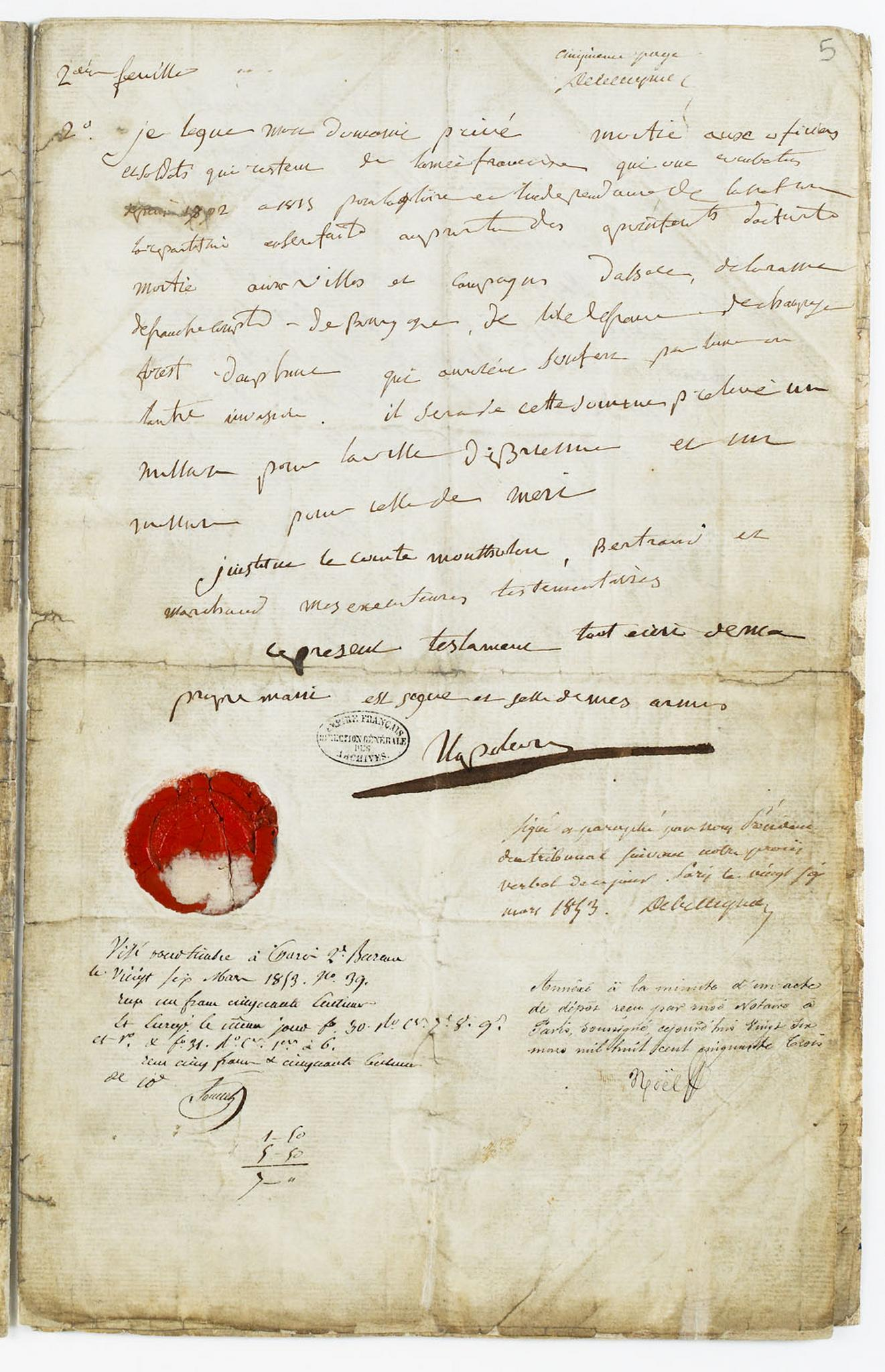
Napoleon's last will (1821)

=== After Napoleon's death ===
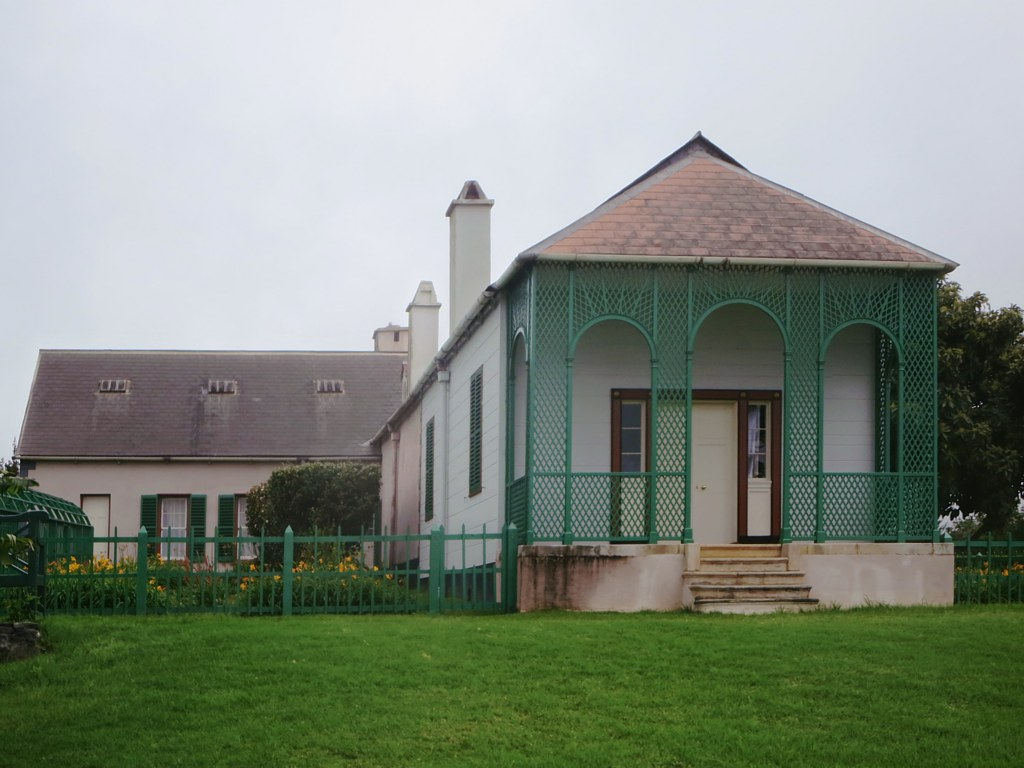
Longwood House in September 2014

Following Napoleon's death, Longwood House reverted to the East India Company and later to the Crown, and was used for agricultural purposes. Reports of its neglect reached Napoleon III who, from 1854, negotiated with the British government for its transfer to France. In 1858 it was bought by the French government, along with the Valley of the Tomb for a sum of £7,100. Since then they have been under the ownership of the French Foreign Ministry and a French government representative has lived on the island and has been responsible for managing both properties. In 1959 a third property, The Briars, where Napoleon spent the first two months while Longwood was being prepared, was given to the French government by Dame Mabel Brookes.

As a result of the depredations of termites, in the 1940s the French government considered demolishing the building. New Longwood and the Balcombe's house at The Briars were both demolished at this time, but Longwood House was saved, and it has been restored by recent French curators. The stone steps at the front are the only part of the original fabric to survive.

In 2006 Michel Dancoisne-Martineau donated the heart-shaped Waterfall Valley to the Saint Helena National Trust. In 2008 he donated the land surrounding the pavilion at The Briars to the French republic.

Longwood House is now a museum owned by the French government and administered by non-profit company Saint Helena Napoleonic Heritage Ltd. It is one of two museums on the island, the other being the Museum of Saint Helena.

== See also ==
- Napoleon § Exile on Saint Helena
- French domains of St Helena
- Briars, Saint Helena
- Longwood, Saint Helena
- Longwood, Featherston
