= Mabel Brookes =

Australian humanitarian and socialite (1890–1975)

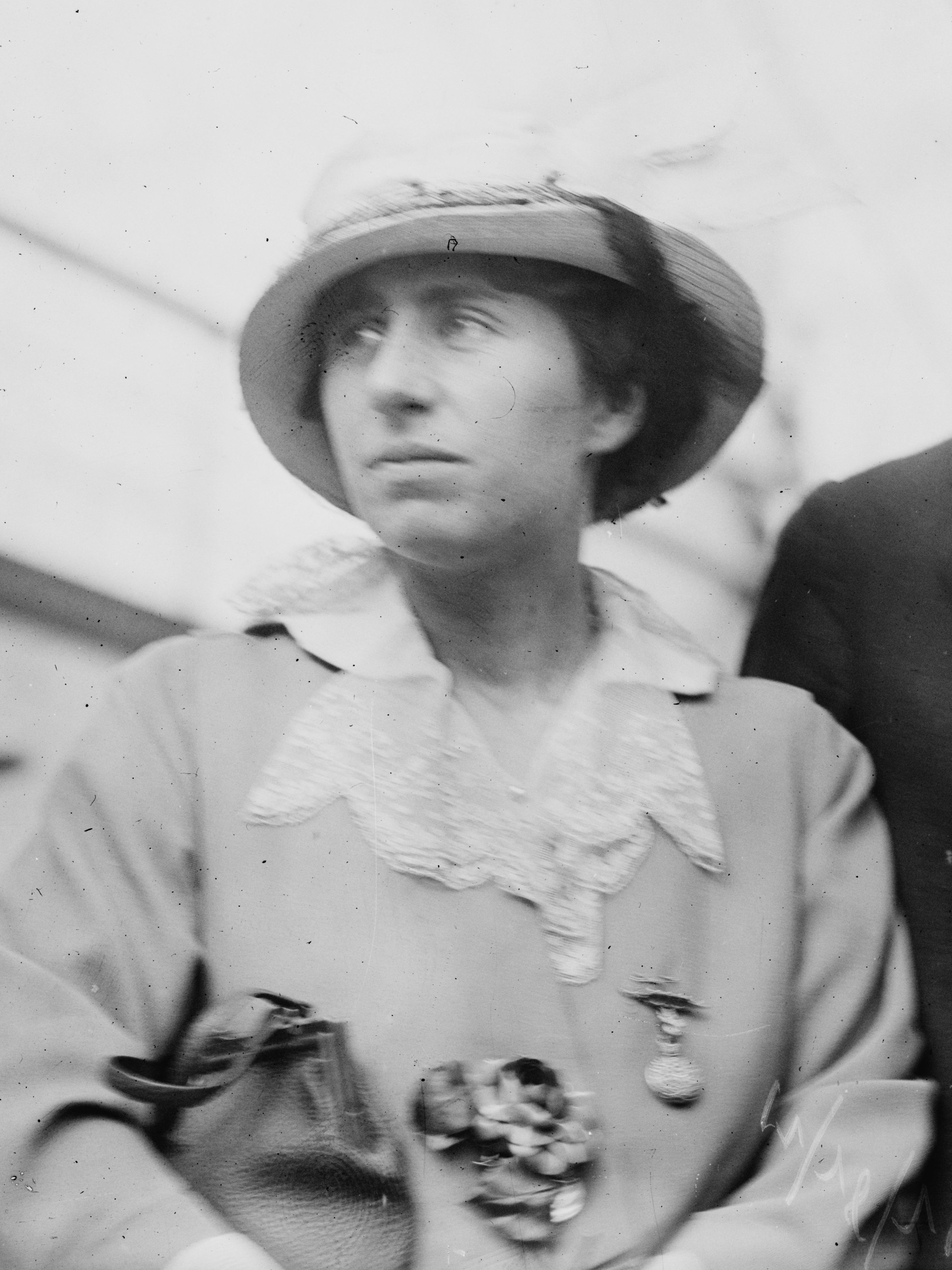
- Born: 15 June 1890; South Yarra
- Died: 30 April 1975 (aged 84); South Yarra
- Occupation: Writer, charity worker, cashier, Commander, accountant
- Spouse(s): Norman Brookes
- Parent(s): Alice Mabel Emmerton
- Awards: Dame Commander of the Order of the British Empire (1955); Commander of the Order of the British Empire (1933); Chevalier of the Legion of Honour

Dame Mabel Brookes, DBE (15 June 1890 – 30 April 1975) was an Australian community worker, activist, socialite, writer, historian, memoirist and humanitarian. Born Mabel Balcombe Emmerton at Raveloe, South Yarra, Victoria in 1890, her best-known service was as president of the Queen Victoria Hospital from 1923 to 1970, where she presided over the addition of three new wings within ten years.

== Early life and marriage ==
Born on 15 June 1890, Brookes was the only child of Melbourne lawyer Harry Emmerton, originally from England, and his wife Alice. After being withdrawn from kindergarten by her mother in order to avoid 'developing a bad accent', Mabel described her childhood as a lonely one; she was educated by her father and a series of governesses. While recuperating from an illness at The Briars in Mornington, she heard from her grandmother, Emma Balcome, of her Balcombe ancestors who lived in The Briars in Saint Helena at the time of the exile of Napoleon. She developed a fascination with Saint Helena and Napoleon's exile there. Another ancestor, Sir William Doveton, was a member of the council of Saint Helena when Napoleon was there.

When Mabel was 14, a young man allegedly told her mother that Mabel was 'dull, plain and reads too much', prompting a dramatic change in her parents' approach to her upbringing. After being presented at the Edwardian court in London, at 18 Mabel was engaged to Norman Brookes, a tennis player, who was the first Australian to win Wimbledon. They married in St Paul's Anglican Cathedral, Melbourne, on 19 April 1911. In 1914, with a baby daughter, she accompanied Brookes on his tennis trips to Europe and the USA. Whilst in the USA Norman Brookes and Tony Wilding won the Davis Cup, which Mabel supposedly used as a rose bowl.

== World War I and II ==
During World War I, in 1915, she joined her husband in Cairo where he was working as commissioner for the Australian Branch of the British Red Cross. Along with other officer's wives she tended to sick and wounded servicemen, as well as assisting in the establishment of a rest home for nurses. Her experiences in Egypt left a deep impression on her, inspiring her war novels Broken Idols (Melville and Mullin, 1917) and Old Desires (Australasian Authors Agency, 1922) which were largely set in Egypt, and sparking a lifelong engagement on matters of public health.

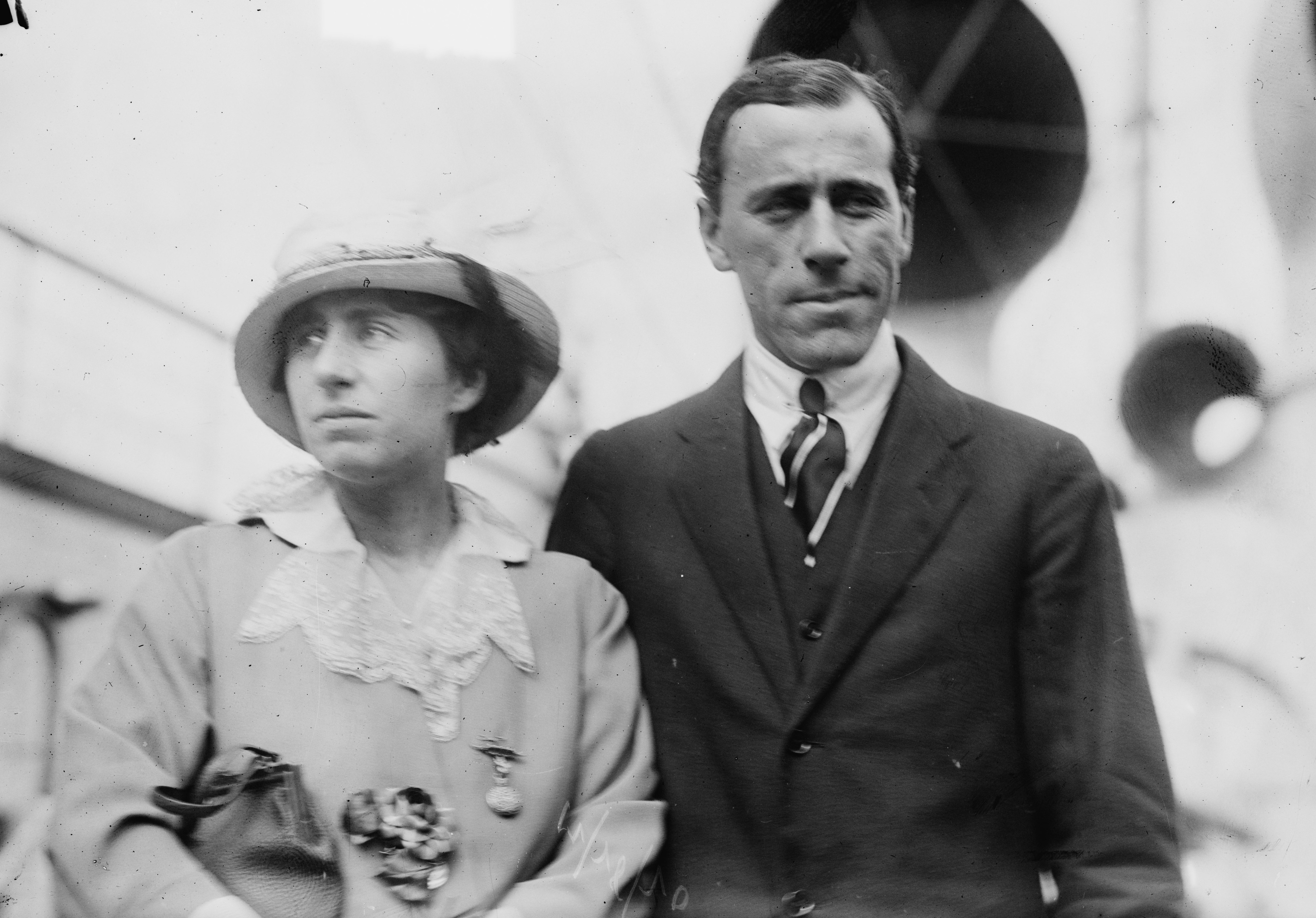
Mabel and Norman Brookes

On her husband's posting to Mesopotamia, she returned to Melbourne in 1917. In 1918 she served on the committee of the Royal Children's Hospital, then became president of the Children's Frankston Orthopaedic Hospital, the Anglican Babies' Home and the Society for the Prevention of Cruelty to Children. She was an original member and a divisional officer of the Girl Guides' Association executive committee, foundation president of the Institute of Almoners and of the Animal Welfare League. She was also a member of the Australian Red Cross Society's federal executive and president of the Ladies' Swimming Association.

During World War II the Brookes family vacated their home Kurneh to allow it to be used by the Red Cross as a convalescent home for returned soldiers. The Brookes family moved to their other property, Elm Tree House, and entertained Australian and American officers, including future American president Lyndon B. Johnson (during an official state visit to Australia in 1967, Johnson would take time out to visit Mabel at Elm Tree House, attracting a crowd of hundreds to gather outside the house). Mabel Brookes was commandant of the Australian Women's Air Training Corps, and took on shift work at the Maribyrnong Munitions Factory filling cartridges. Other war work included establishing Air Force House and organizing, at the request of the minister for the army, an annexe for servicewomen at the Queen Victoria Hospital.

== Presidency of Queen Victoria Hospital ==
From 1923 to 1970, Mabel served as president for the Queen Victoria Hospital. By all accounts she was a fierce and capable advocate on behalf of the hospital, and oversaw the addition of three new wings, one of which was named after her in appreciation of her decades of service. She fought hard to get suitable accommodation for the hospital, describing 10am on 17 December 1946 as the proudest hour of her life when the last patient was moved from the old hospital on Little Lonsdale Street to the new building on the corner of Lonsdale and Swanston Streets. "It was when I realised that the women of Melbourne had finally and decisively won their 55-year-old battle for a large hospital completely staffed by women... It was a fight by women against prejudice, suspicion and intolerance of women," she was quoted in The Argus as saying, "There's no finer feeling than winning the supposedly hopeless battle."

== Political career ==
Brookes attempted a political career by standing twice for parliament, but was unsuccessful. She stood for the Division of Flinders in the 1943 federal election as a Woman for Canberra candidate and in the 1952 state election for the seat of Toorak for the Electoral Reform League.

She was appointed a Commander of the Order of the British Empire (CBE) in 1933 and elevated to Dame of the order (DBE) in 1955 for services to hospitals and charity.

Her lifelong fascination with Saint Helena and Napoleon led her to purchase The Briars, the pavilion where Napoleon had stayed, in 1959, and donate it to the French Ministry of Foreign Affairs. The French Government appointed her as Chevalier de la Légion d'honneur in 1960 in acknowledgement of her gift. She published St Helena Story, an account of Napoleon's exile and his relationship with the Balcombes, in 1960.

In 1967, Monash University conferred an honorary LL.D. for her services to the Queen Victoria Hospital, of which she was president. It had by that time become a Monash University teaching hospital.

Dame Mabel Brookes published her memoirs in 1974 in which she recounted events in her life, including meeting many notable and historic people of the time.

She died at South Yarra on 30 April 1975, aged 84, survived by two of her three daughters.

Sir Robert Menzies described her as 'one of the most remarkable women of our time', and that she possessed 'a beautiful organising mind.'

== Writing career ==
Brookes was a published novelist and memoirist. She wrote the following works:

=== Novels ===
- Broken Idols. Melbourne: Melville and Mullin, 1917.
- On the Knees of the Gods. Melbourne: Melville and Mullin, 1918. Illustrated by Penleigh Boyd.
- Old Desires. Melbourne: Australasian Authors Agency, 1922.
- Riders of time / Mabel Brookes; with illustrations by Harold Freedman. 1967.

=== History ===
- St Helena Story. London: Heinemann, 1960. Deals with Napoleon Bonaparte's internment on St Helena island and was introduced by Sir Robert Menzies, former Prime Minister of Australia.

=== Memoir ===
- Crowded Galleries. Melbourne: Heinemann, 1956. With chapters on tennis by Sir Norman Brookes, her husband and 1907 and 1914 winner of the Wimbledon singles and doubles tennis tournament, and America's Davis Cup.
- Riders of Time. Melbourne: Macmillan, 1967.
- Memoirs. Melbourne: Macmillan, 1974.

== Book collecting ==
She built up a substantial collection of books with a focus on the Elizabethan era and Australiana. In 1959 she joined the Book Collectors Society of Australia and was later elected its president. Her Australiana books were auctioned in 1968, the sale catalogue containing 474 items. Among the highlights were the three volumes of The Mammals of Australia (1845-1863) by John Gould.
