= Virgo =

Virgo may refer to:

== Arts and entertainment ==
- Virgo (film), a 1970 Egyptian film
- Virgo (character), several Marvel Comics characters
- Virgo Asmita, a character in the manga Saint Seiya: The Lost Canvas
- Virgo (album), by Virgo Four, 1989
- "Virgo", a song by Atmosphere from Mi Vida Local, 2018
- "Virgo", a song by Nas from Street's Disciple, 2004

== Science ==
- Virgo (constellation), a constellation
- Virgo Cluster, a cluster of galaxies in the constellation Virgo
- Virgo Stellar Stream, remains of a dwarf galaxy
- Virgo Supercluster, a galactic supercluster
- Virgo interferometer, a European gravitational-wave telescope

== Ships ==
- HSwMS Virgo, several ships of the Swedish Navy
- USS Virgo, a United States Navy attack cargo ship
- NYK Virgo, a container ship

== Other uses ==
- Virgo (surname)
- Virgo (astrology), the sixth astrological sign of the zodiac
- Virgo (moth), a genus of moth
- Virgo (software), an open source Java application server
- Microcar Virgo, Virgo 2, Virgo 3 and Virgo Luxe, former microcar models
- IK Virgo, a Swedish association football club from Gothenburg
- Aqua Virgo, one of the 11 aqueducts that supplied the city of ancient Rome with water

== See also ==
- Virgos Merlot, or Virgos, an American rock band
