= ZENN =

Canadian electric car

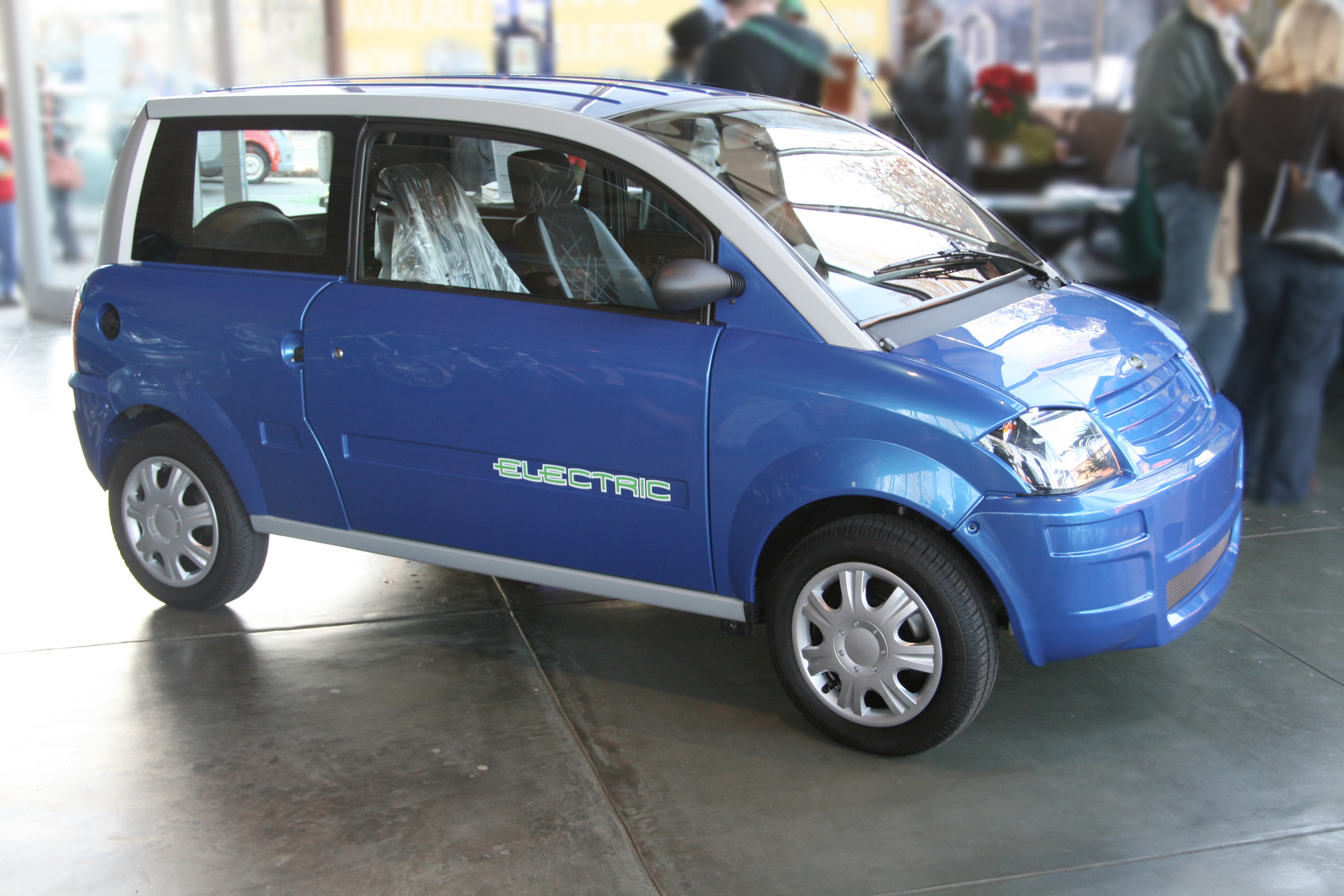

Overview
- Manufacturer: ZENN Motor Company of Toronto, Ontario, Canada
- Also called: Feel Good Cars
- Production: 2006–2010
- Assembly: Saint-Jérôme, Quebec

Body and chassis
- Class: NEV/LSV
- Body style: 3-door hatchback

Dimensions
- Length: 3,100 mm (122.0 in)
- Width: 1,600 mm (63.0 in)
- Height: 1,400 mm (55.1 in)
- Curb weight: 1,200 lb (544 kg)

ZENN (Zero Emission, No Noise) is a two-seat battery electric vehicle that was produced by the ZENN Motor Company of Canada from 2006 to 2010, designed to qualify as a neighborhood electric vehicle (NEV). It had a range of up to 40 mi (64 km) and was speed-limited to 25 mph (40 km/h). On earlier production models, there was an option of a 'Discovery Pack' which increased the ZENN's range a few miles. In later models it was standard.

In September 2009 CEO Ian Clifford announced that ZENN was ceasing car production to concentrate on selling its drive-train technology to other manufacturers. The company had only sold a total of 500 vehicles and cited slow sales as a reason for the decision. Production of the ZENN LSV ceased in March 2010, and service support and provision of parts ended on June 30, 2013.

== Design ==
The vehicle is based on the Microcar MC2, in production in France since the early 2000s, and produced under license from Microcar's parent company Bénéteau. The Microcar MC2, and the short wheelbase MC1, are sold in Europe with 500cc diesel engines, and are considered quadricycles there.

Electric power is stored in six 12V lead-acid gel batteries, which has a recharge cycle of 8 hours. Valve regulated (low maintenance) lead-acid AGM cells were available at extra cost initially, then included as standard equipment in later models.

Also optional were a retractable fabric sunroof, air conditioning, floor mats, and audio entertainment center. The vehicle originally was built with a DC motor and GE controller, and in 2008 was modified with an AC motor and Curtis controller. The AC motor was stated to be better for hill climbing, initial acceleration, and overall performance.

On January 16, 2007 EEStor, Inc. announced plans to ship 15 kilowatt-hour Electrical Energy Storage Units (EESU) to ZENN Motor Company by end of 2007 for use in the ZENN electric vehicles. In a July 2009 interview, CEO Ian Clifford stated that EEStor anticipated "delivery of production prototype EESU to us by the end of 2009".

== cityZENN ==
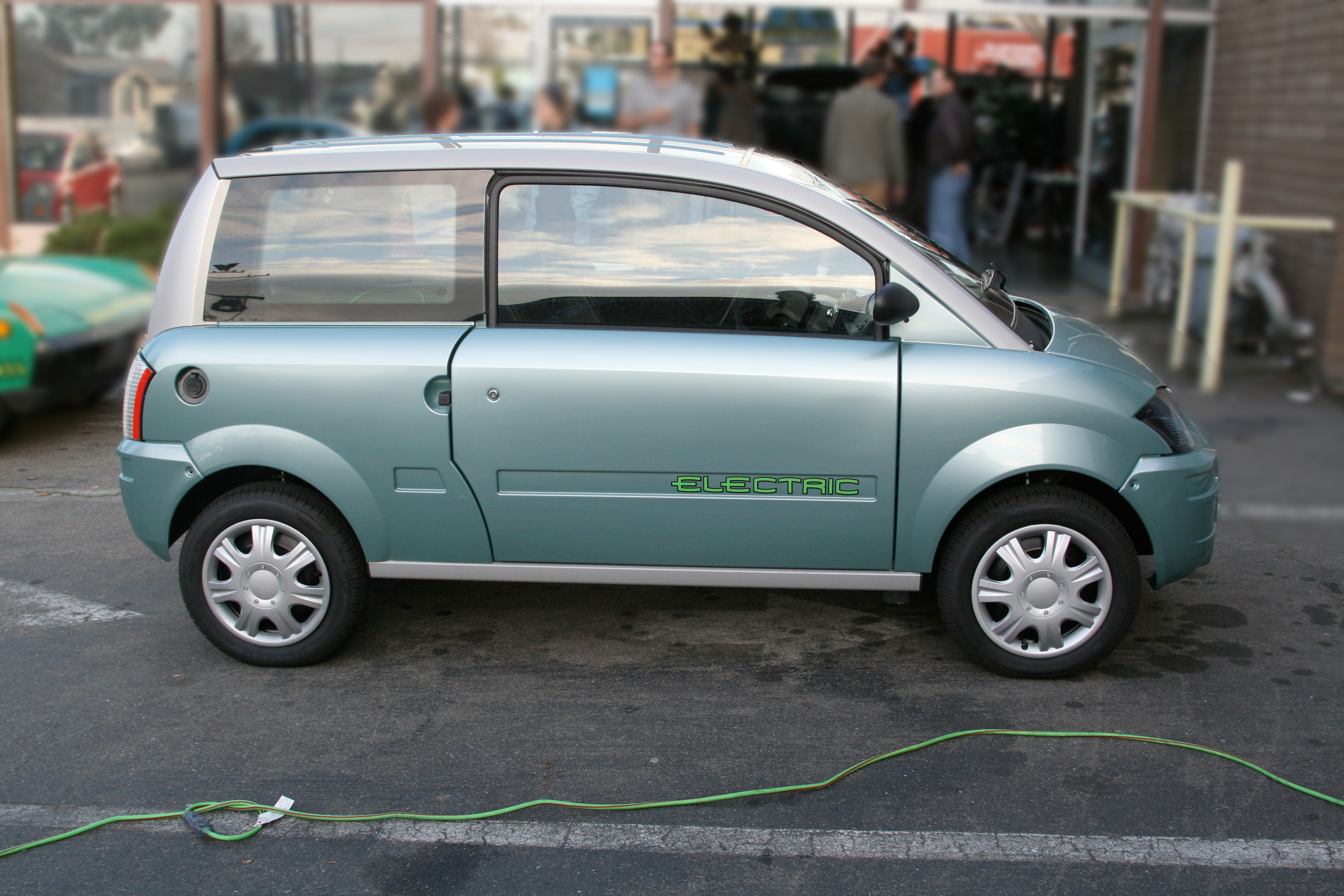
cityZENN

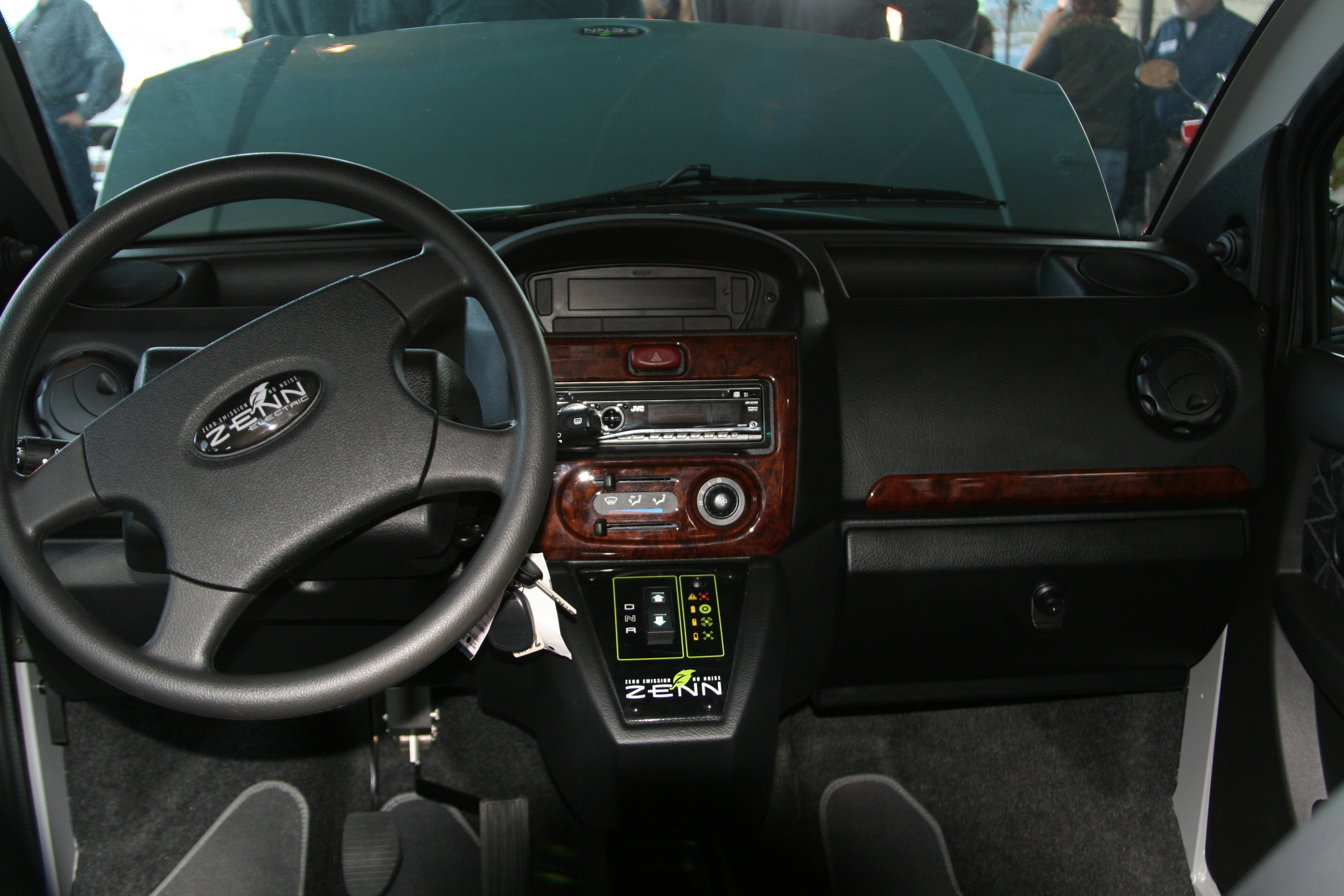
cityZENN interior

The cityZENN was a planned fully-certified, highway-capable vehicle with a top speed of 125 kilometres per hour (78 mph) and a range of 400 kilometres (250 mi). Powered by EEStor, the cityZENN was to have been rechargeable in less than 5 minutes, feature operating costs 1/10 of a typical internal combustion engine vehicle and be 100% emission-free at the point of use. The cityZENN was being designed to meet the transportation requirements of a large percentage of drivers worldwide. Ian Clifford, CEO of ZENN Motor Company, also stated that a normal household outlet with 110 volt supply would fully charge the EEStor powered CityZENN in 4 hours, and a normal household outlet with 220 volt supply can fully charge the EEStor powered CityZENN in 2 hours. The 5 minute fast charge would only be possible at special charge stations. CityZENN target price was slated to be US$25,000–30,000.

Plans for the CityZENN were canceled in 2009 and production of all LSVs was ceased in late 2009 and production employees were released. In fiscal years 2008 and 2009, ZENN Motors had company-wide losses of $65,000 for each of the $15,000 lead-acid LSV it sold (approximately 360).

== Legalization in Canada ==
Although the company was headquartered in Toronto and manufactured in Saint-Jérôme, north of Montreal, the vehicle was first introduced in the United States. The regulatory regime in Canada was less hospitable. Federal regulations set up by Transport Canada to approve low-speed vehicles (LSVs) for public road use excluded the ZENN and other NEVs from Canadian roads. ZENN's battle with Transport Canada over LSV regulations was periodically mentioned in Canadian news.

The ZENN car met all the regulatory requirements in the United States, the same regulations adopted by Transport Canada in 2000. It took two years of political red tape before ZENN received its National Safety Mark from Transport Canada. The safety mark was granted after a report by the CBC caused public outcry against the government's lack of interest in environmentally friendly alternatives to fossil fuel vehicles.

Since August 16, 2000, British Columbia has allowed LSVs on its roads, but this exception to the federal law was designed mainly for large, slow-moving farm equipment. Although the ZENN was technically legal in British Columbia, the cars would have needed to be equipped with warning signs and yellow flashing lights to distinguish themselves as slow-moving. ZENN Motor Company did not see these conditions as viable for establishing a retail market. After ZENN received its National Safety Mark, the province of British Columbia vowed to improve its support for electric vehicles. It granted each municipality the right to make LSVs legal on their roads. As of November 2008, the city of Vancouver and the township of Oak Bay, a suburb near Victoria, were the only municipalities to grant LSV use.

In Ontario, LSVs can be used on roadways within provincial or municipal parks and conservation areas (when driven by an authorized park employee) or on private property. A grey area is also using a slow-moving vehicle sign on the back of a LSV and if approached by a police officer, to say that it is for farm use.

On June 17, 2008, Quebec announced a pilot project for the ZENN, which would allow residents of Quebec to drive a ZENN in Canada. On October 4, 2008, ZENN Motor Company opened a retailer out of its production plant in Saint-Jérôme with a factory-direct approach to sales. This marked the first time a ZENN or any other low-speed commercial vehicle could be sold in Canada.
