= YMCA Australia =

Non-profit organisation in Australia

- Nickname: The Y Australia; The Y
- Named after: Young Men's Christian Association
- Formation: 15 March 1851; 175 years ago
- Founded at: Adelaide, South Australia
- Type: Nonprofit
- Legal status: Charity
- Headquarters: Essendon Fields, Victoria
- Region served: Australia
- President: Amelia Shaw
- Main organ: Federated board
- Parent organisation: World Alliance of the YMCAs
- Affiliations: Asia & Pacific Alliance of YMCAs
- Website: ymca.org.au

YMCA Australia, also called The Y Australia, is a nonprofit youth organisation that comprises twelve member YMCAs located across Australia. YMCA Australia programs cover accommodation, benevolent programmes, children’s services, community initiatives, recreation, and training.

== Governance ==
Administered by a federated board, the twelve member organisations are the YMCA bodies located in Ballarat, Hobart, New South Wales, the Northern Territory, Queensland, South Australia, Victoria, Western Australia and Whittlesea.

== History ==
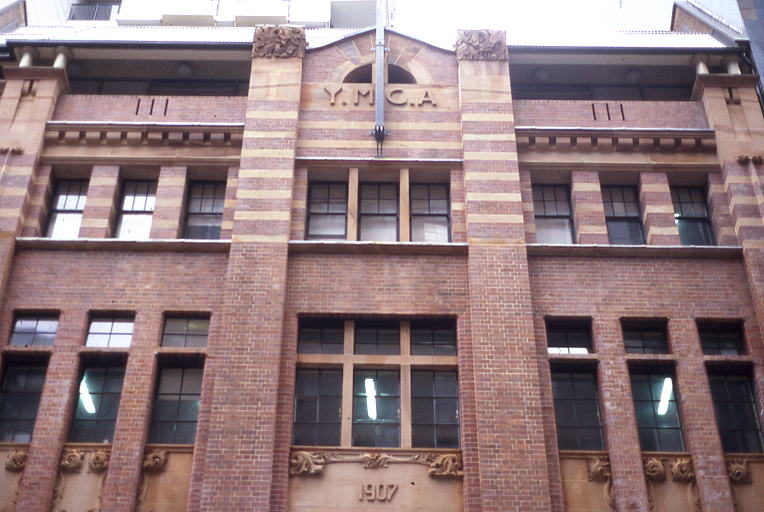
YMCA building in Pitt Street, Sydney, erected in 1907

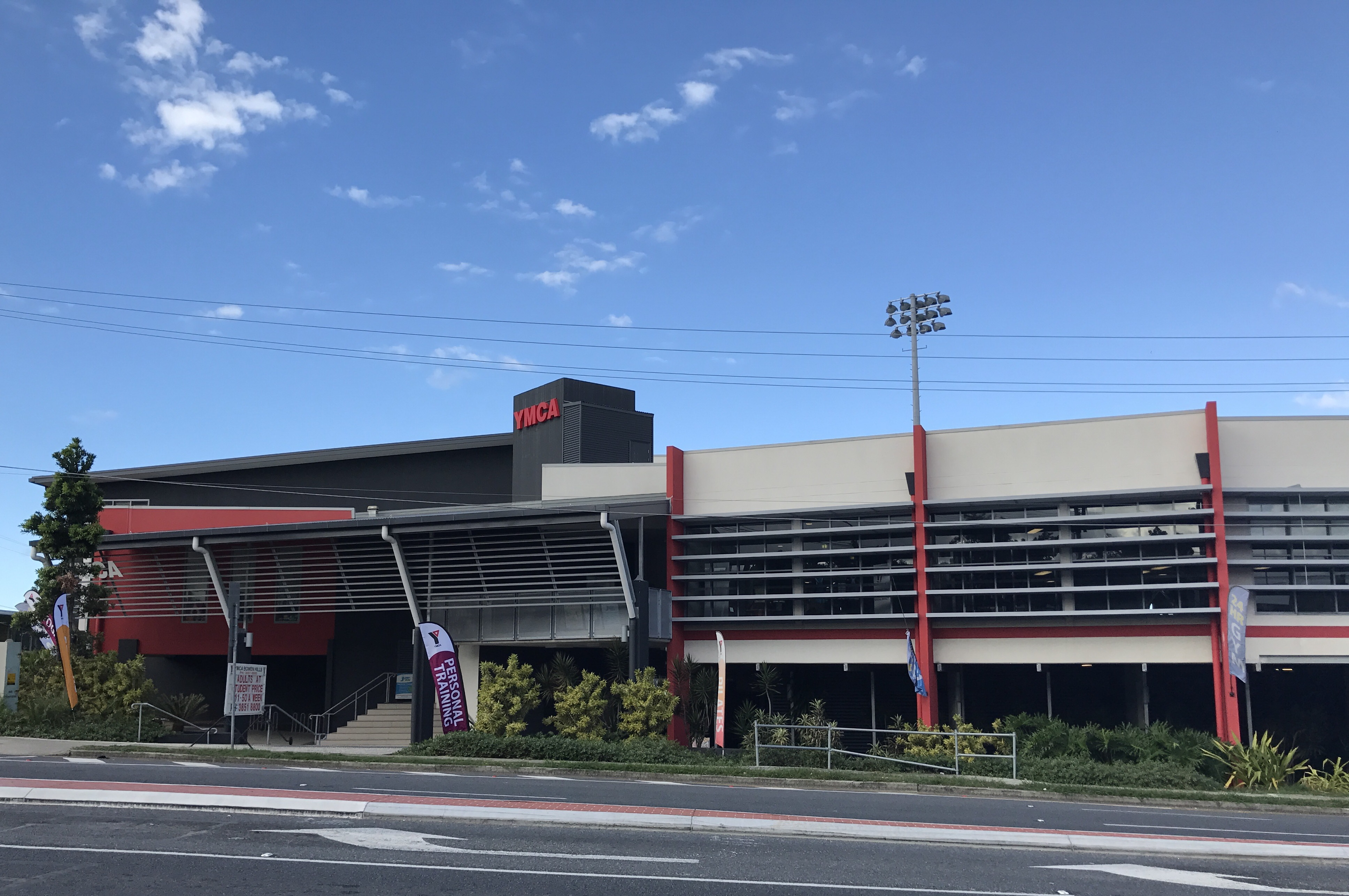
YMCA centre in Bowen Hills, Queensland

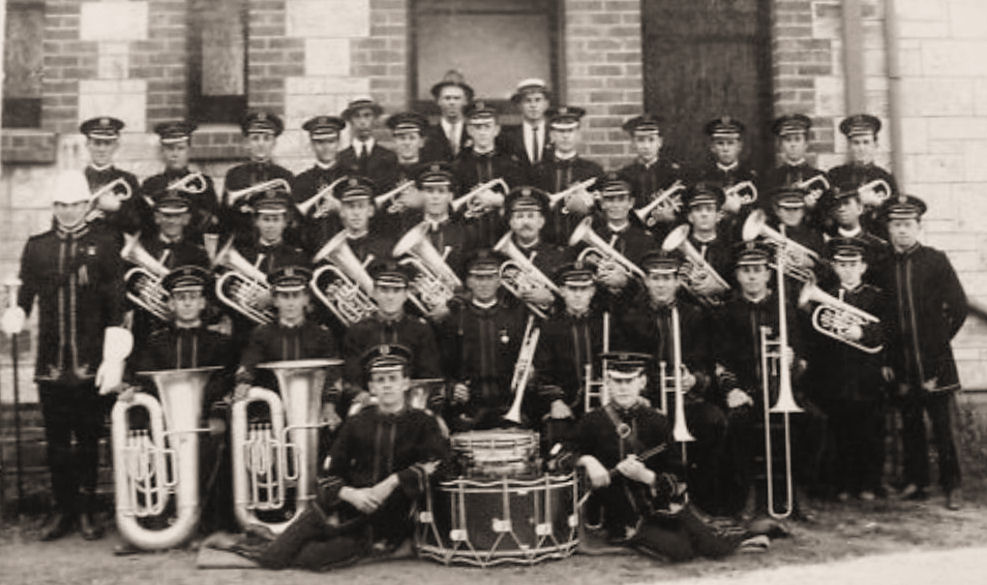
Our Boys Institute brass band in Adelaide, 1917

YMCA Australia began in Adelaide on 15 March 1851. In 1853, branches opened in both Melbourne and Sydney; and in Hobart in 1854. In 1855, YMCA Australia gained full member status of the World Alliance of the YMCAs. The Y Australia is also a member of the Asia & Pacific Alliance of YMCAs. The National Committee of YMCAs comprising New Zealand and Australia was formed in 1906, later separating between the two countries in 1920.

=== South Australia ===
In February 1850 a meeting was called primarily for the formation of an association for apprentices and others, after their day's work, to enjoy books, lectures, discussions, readings, friendly relief and recreation for a leisure hour. In September 1850 records show that this became "The Young Men's Christian Association of South Australia" as evidenced by a member's letter in London YMCA Report 1851.

The discovery of gold in Ballarat caused a large migration from South Australia and by 1852 approximately 8,000 residents left for the Goldfields. As a consequence, the various established YMCA groups failed and by 1870 none remained.

On 28 November 1878, a public meeting was held in the Exchange Room of the Adelaide Town Hall, for the promotion of a revival of the YMCA in Adelaide. Sir John Colton was asked to preside, but was absent through illness and the chair was occupied by Richard Searle who became the inaugural president of the association. A committee was formed to draft a constitution, later drawn up and signed by 585 Adelaide young men.

The YMCA of Adelaide was among the earliest community organisations established in the city. Its board and the role of general secretary included individuals active in social and civic life.

==== General Secretaries and CEO's ====
- 1879

H. H. Birt was appointed by the board on a part-time basis. Birt oversaw activities in the temporary premises, Salisbury Chambers in king William Street and to manage the alteration of the newly leased premises in Gawler Place which opened 27 August 1879.

- 1880–1886

Alex. Walker was secretary of the Flinders Street Presbyterian Men's Society which merged into the YMCA with him continuing as General Secretary. In 1886 the annual report of the YMCA indicated a lack of funds and Walker confessed to having appropriated £1288/16/7. In court and before Chief Justice Sir Samuel Way, Walker revealed the money had gone on assisting impecunious young men. Walker was regarded as a very hard working Secretary who said he did not have a night off in any month and the board believed he did not have fraudulent intent but compassion rather than criminality. He was sent to jail for 4 years hard labour.

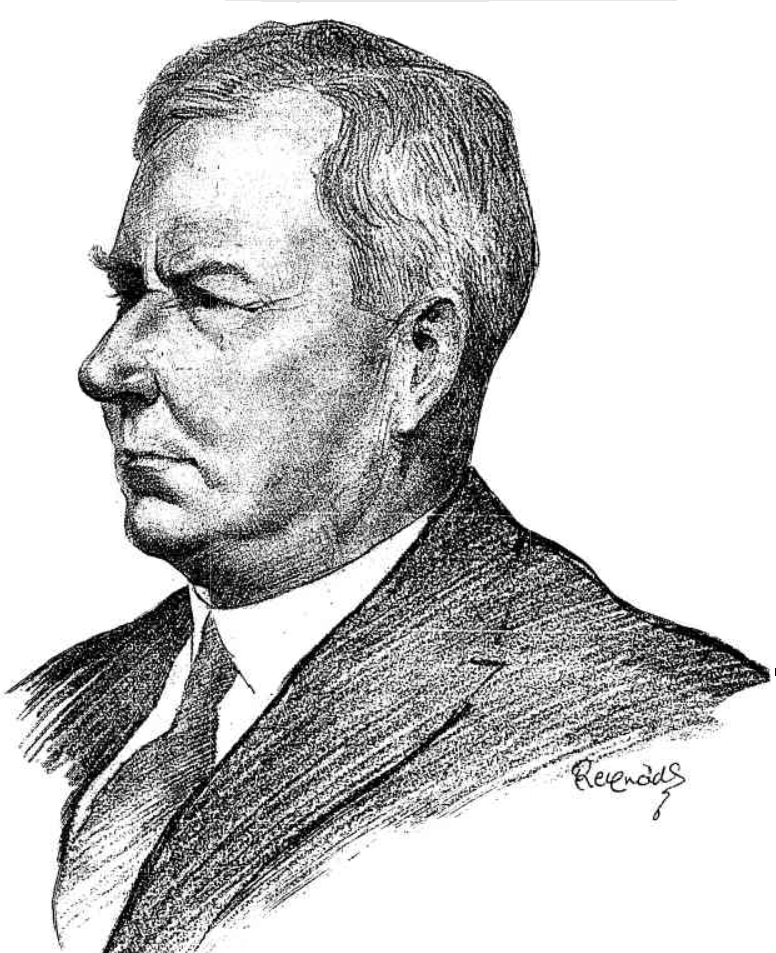
John James Virgo 1929

- 1886–1900

John James Virgo was appointed General Secretary following the conviction of the previous General Secretary for embezzling funds. The 'new' YMCA building in Gawler Place was opened in 1884 and the Glenelg-born Virgo commenced in 1886. In 1888 the YMCA began Our Boys Institute for boys 13 to 18 years of age. For young men, activities included Bible classes, sporting teams, lectures, debating and choral societies, a gymnasium, camps and an employment and immigration department. Virgo was prominent in Adelaide's religious life and conducted evangelistic services on Sunday evenings at the Theatre Royal in Hindley Street. 1900 Virgo became secretary of the Australasian Union of YMCAs and 1903 was appointed secretary of the YMCA, Sydney then General Secretary of the London Central YMCA in 1911. Virgo wrote his memoirs in 1939; and died in 1956.

- 1905–1916

H. A. Wheeler was a capable administrator who adapted the programmes and emphasis to the times. Much of the evangelical work was dropped to focus on the work with young men. In 1908 Wheeler left for two years to work with the YMCA in America. This forged a link with North American YMCAs and more modern methods of physical development and a rapid development of membership. An employment department was formed in 1912 fulfilling an important social welfare role especially for young male migrants. At the outbreak of WWI Wheeler took the initiative in promoting a nation-wide War Services YMCA organisation and later was placed in charge of all Australian War Services in the European Zone. WWI saw the Adelaide YMCA support YMCA staff overseas as evidenced by a letter to Wheeler from Menza camp Egypt by Col. S. Price Weir, OC, 10th battalion. By 1916, the army department was the largest work done by the Adelaide YMCA with operations at Mitcham, Cheltenham, Balaklava, Murray Bridge, Torrens Island, Gawler. The YMCA provided comfort, counselling and recreation to the troops. YMCA war services were funded by public donation and during this time in South Australia £199,185 was raised.

- 1908–1910

H. S. Stafford was appointed as acting General Secretary. Stafford, an American from Dayton Ohio was working at the Bendigo YMCA and took the acting role while Wheeler spent two years working for the YMCA in the United States. His work transformed the organisation as recognised in a speech by the then President Henry J Holden who said of him. ".. it was not an association of Christian young men but a Christian association for all young men"

- 1916–1920

The title of General Secretary was discontinued this period as post war the organisation needed to adjust having been dominated by the military units. Two officers controlled the organisation. M. U. Maddern was secretary to the Army Department and R Taylor became Secretary of the General Department. This gave lack of continuity at the top at a time when the planning for transition to peace time was so important.

- 1920

Jack Massey began his YMCA career as a field secretary attached to the Australian Imperial Forces A Christian (Anglican) and a pacifist he served in England, France, and Belgium, assisting soldiers awaiting repatriation. He was appointed as General Secretary of the Adelaide YMCA in 1920 and went on to build and expand the organisation as well as develop programmes and advocate for young people with accomplishments including establishing a court for juvenile offenders and guiding amateur football in SA. He also provided support for British Boys brought out to help in agriculture. He attended the 100 years of Adelaide YMCA in 1978 not long before his death in 1981 and was acclaimed as one of the great men of the organisation and the community for his life of service.

- 1939–1960

Alf Gibbs served as YMCA War Services Department Chief Commissioner during WWI, overseeing YMCA staff in almost all military camps and some 62 representative overseas to assist the troops. Gibbs was appointed General Secretary Adelaide YMCA after some negotiations with the Adelaide YMCA Board while Alf was in India. He oversaw the expansion of the YMCA and the sale of the Gawler Place building. In 1956 he negotiated the purchase of the Presbyterian Church in Flinders Street which was demolished the following year and a new modern YMCA youth complex and residential facility was constructed. Gibbs led the fundraising that enabled the construction of YMCA youth facilities at Walkerville (demolished 12–18 September 2024), Kilburn, Elizabeth and Glenelg. In 1945 "Loftia Park", a large block of land in the lovely Mount Lofty Ranges, was purchased with swimming pool, tennis courts, sports grounds and other facilities partly completed.

- 1960s
  - Graeme Irvine was an evangelical Christian and developed in the Adelaide YMCA a group of similar thinking leaders. Ultimately this became exclusive and counterproductive. He went on to build up World Vision Australia and then to New York where he grew the organisation into a large multinational NGO. Irvine was in 1978 among the signers of the Declaration of Internationalization, which declared a set of objectives for World Vision in its operations throughout the world. In 1988, Irvine became the first non-American president of World Vision International.
  - Jim Daly came from Woodside army camp where he was a YMCA army officer. After his Army service he joined the Adelaide "Y" as Extension Secretary under Irvine having responsibility for developing boards, programmes and ensuring the viability of Walkerville, Northern Districts (Kilburn), West Croydon and Elizabeth Branches. He was a senior leader at the first Kangaroo Island Camp and many others in preceding years. They were initially organised initially by Don McCallum, Physical Education Director and in following years by Ross Baxter Glen Powell, Gary Kelly, Dean Manning, Dave Badger, Tim Looker. The Kangaroo Island Camps ran for nearly 40 years. Daly's particular interest was in Adventure Camping. He personally led groups of senior leaders on Outward Bound-type expeditions to New Zealand, Tasmania (Cradle Mountain Track, Flinders Ranges and the Grampians). Daly went on become a Senior Office, then assistant director in the newly formed South Australian Government Department of Tourism, Recreation and Sport. He also completed his Master of Health at UNISA. Daly continues his involvement in the "Y" as a Life Member. Daly wrote an Honours Thesis on "The Adelaide YMCA: 1879-1934". This thesis studied the changing role to the "Y" the First World War, and Depression. A copy is available from the YMCA SA office and will be eventually online. Daly also authored a book "Recreation and Sport Planning and Design."
- 1970s
  - Glen Powell came to Australia with his family in about 1970 and worked under Daly until he became CEO. He was ex-Chicago YMCA and only came for "a couple of years". 50 year later he is still here living in Adelaide. Powell was a transformational leader of the organisation. Powell was a man of ideas and happy to experiment with new programme initiatives. He transformed camping into a massive co-ed programme, introduced Explorers and Adventurers which at its peak had about 1000 families involved. He set up the first child safety programme "Alert Assert" which was rolled out in schools. He negotiated the first PPP at Aberfoyle Hub which was a three way collaboration with the council, Government and YMCA. Other initiatives included Dollar Day, a door-knocking fundraiser, and the City Port Fun Run which attracted thousands of runners.
- 1980s
  - Trevor Cleland was promoted from accountant to CEO with limited success. This created a crisis which inspired the recruitment to the board of some former "Y" members high in the corporate world who could use their expertise to review the organisation. Clive Armour (CEO of ETSA) Colin Williamson (CEO of Strategic Resources Consulting). A restructure of the organisation and shaking off the old Methodist mentality about paying people for their 'calling'. The board upped the salary offering from $19,000 to $52,000 and went to market for a new CEO.
- 1990s
  - Rob Dowling (c. 1990–2003) came from Carclew Performing Arts and became their first leaders to be called a CEO rather than General Secretary. Dowling was a transformational leader and kept all the "Y" programmes running at a high level and established a Registered Training Organisation running certificate course out of the Flinders Street headquarters. With the Flinders Street property becoming outdated and run down Dowling sought to redevelop the site. A 12-storey, strata titled building, with the "Y" having some floors and selling off others. Plans were drawn by Woodhead Australia and funding partners sought. The scheme was not successful, and the Flinders Street property was then sold as cost of fire compliance and the age of the building proved uneconomical to refurbish. Closing the residential wing affected the organisation's cash flow. Dowling sought to purchase another building, an old bank, but was not supported by the Board. Dowling left to undertake teaching and research at Flinders University before retirement to the Adelaide hills.
  - Dave Bedson held the position for a short time.
- 2000s
  - Mike Kelly was driven by the board policy to spend his time trying to win contracts for student accommodation which was an emerging area of service due to the growing numbers of overseas students in Adelaide. This chewed up significant funds which ultimately delivered no results and the money from the sale of the Flinders Street property began to diminish. Changing time saw the diminishing of the camping programme and Explorers and Adventurers.
  - Peter Schwartz was a former AFL football player who did some very good work, won the Aquadome contract and set up a Community Strengthening unit, after-school care and negotiated access to Home and Community Care grant funding to expand YMCA social services.
- 2010s
  - Haydn Robins (2012–2019) came from YMCA Victoria and transformed the South Australian organisation into a modern competitive management organisation, running sport, aquatic and community centres across South Australia. Supported by a senior leadership team he assembled, he took the organisation from near insolvency to financial security and a higher level of service delivery. Robins had an accomplished career as a footballer playing AFL and SANFL. While CEO, Robins instituted "reciprocal rights" which made the facilities across South Australia available to any resident in the state rather than being limited to the closest YMCA. In addition, under his leadership the Fleurieu Aquatic Centre offered free memberships to children under ten in an effort to combat childhood obesity.
  - Andrew Mundy served as acting CEO in 2019. He stepped in at short notice from his role as General manager Operations and earned his name on the baton that is passed from one CEO to the next. In 2020 the Covid pandemic struck sending the community into various lockdowns and causing YMCA facilities to shut and then impose limits on proximity. Andrew played a key role in managing the organisation through the crisis.
- 2020s
  - David Paterson commenced in January 2020, and had previous senior roles with World Vision, Medibank Private, and in a multinational marketing agency group. Paterson is a co-founder of Social Capital and the Committee for Adelaide, a former professor of Innovation & Enterprise at UniSA, a past board member of YMCA Victoria, and is one of the co-founders of YMCA Victoria's The Bridge Project, which has helped reduce juvenile recidivism from 65% to 3%. Early into his tenure, he was faced with the COVID pandemic.

== See also ==
- Camp Manyung
