= Camp Manyung =

Heritage-listed youth camp program in Victoria, Australia

- Location of the house in Greater Metropolitan Melbourne
- Alternative names: Manyung Recreation Camp

General information
- Status: Completed
- Type: Holiday camp
- Architectural style: Cabins
- Location: 35 Sunnyside Road, Mount Eliza, Mornington Peninsula, Melbourne, Victoria, Australia
- Coordinates: 38°12′05″S 145°04′02″E
- Completed: 1920; 106 years ago
- Owner: YMCA Victoria

Website
- camps.ymca.org.au

Victorian Heritage Register
- Official name: Manyung Recreation Camp
- Type: Registered place
- Designated: 15 March 2001
- Reference no.: H1895
- Heritage overlay no.: HO235
- Categories: Recreation and Entertainment; Religion

Register of the National Estate
- Official name: Manyung Recreation Camp
- Type: Defunct register
- Designated: undated
- Reference no.: 103205

Camp Manyung, also known as the Manyung Recreation Camp, is a holiday camp site, located at 35 Sunnyside Road, in Mount Eliza, on the Mornington Peninsula, in the south eastern suburbs of Melbourne, in Victoria, Australia.

Built in 1920 on the traditional lands of the Bunurong people, the camp site was added to the Victorian Heritage Register on 15 March 2001 in recognition of its historical and social significance; and was also added to non-statutory lists by the Victorian branch of the National Trust on 2 October 2000 and the now defunct Register of the National Estate on an unknown date.

The camp is one of seven discovery camp sites operated by YMCA Victoria for schools, community groups and families.

== History ==
In 1920, Thomas Baker, the founder of Kodak Australia and the Alice & Thomas Baker Medical Institute, enabled use of 5 hectares (13 acres) of his large Manyung estate, at Mount Eliza, for an inaugural 'Christmas Camp' for young people affiliated with YMCA Melbourne. Pleased with the outcome of the inaugural and subsequent camps, from 1925, Baker funded the development of a permanent camp under the auspices of the YMCA, including construction of a timber hall.

The program was developed by Ivor Burge who studied physical education at the International YMCA College, in Massachusetts. It was at this same college that basketball was introduced as a new sport in 1891 by the Young Men's Christian Association department of the School for Christian Workers. Burge was appointed as director of physical education at the Melbourne YMCA in 1928, where he instigated and led the development of the camp's program over the next twelve years.

Eric Nicholls, an architect and a friend of Burge, provided pro bono services for the camp's design. Nicholls was employed by Walter Burley Griffin, a leading American architect responsible for the urban design of Canberra, and his architect wife, Marion, who both visited the Mount Eliza site and aided in the design of a concrete-block making machine for the bunk houses as well as their cement roof tiles, using their patented knitlock system. (Note: The roof tiles designed by the Griffins were later replaced with Colorbond steel roofing and the distinctive roof form modified, at the direction of government officers.) Nicholls laid out the camp in c. 1932, designing the masonry structures and an outdoor chapel (c. 1938), named in honour of Charles Crosbie, a pioneering president of the YMCA in Melbourne. Nicholls also initiated a 'miniature botanical gardens' in which every plant was of a different species so that campers could study them.

During World War II, the camp was used by U.S. soldiers for rest and relaxation. The YMCA purchased the site in 1941; and thereafter made various improvements including a cement-sheet laundry and garage in c. 1949; additions to the hall in 1953; a garage was converted to a cottage in 1957, built with the assistance of volunteer labour; the mess hall kitchen was extended in c. 1961; an ablution block was added in c. 1963; a leader's conference room was added in c. 1964; the former hall at Kingsville camp was relocated to Manyung, after the other camp closed; and log-cabin bunk houses were added in c. 1975.

The Camp Buxton YMCA Shoreham camp is thought to be the only camp older than Manyung. However, in 1981, the Shoreham site was sold by the YMCA to the Victorian government.

Camp Manyung is a large youth camp complex built by voluntary labour, and is an example of a Victorian youth camp complex which provides affordable holiday accommodation. The Camp Manyung complex is one of two permanent camps in Victoria that the YMCA is involved in running. It is the only remaining early Victorian property managed today by the YMCA.

Others involved with the camp at various stages included cycling champion Sir Hubert Opperman, and Melbourne businessmen, Bruce Small and Jack Handley.

== Description ==
Camp Manyung consists of gabled concrete block bunk houses laid out in an arc on the hill contour and located to the south-east of the manager's residence which is also concrete block. These are all to Eric Nicholls' design. To the west of the bunk houses is the outdoor chapel which consists of unusual form seating with stepped ends set on tiers radiating from a dais. The early buildings and landscape of the camp are architecturally notable for their expression of both Nicholls' and the Griffin's style and principles and demonstrates the influence of the Griffins in Australia in an unusual context.

The landscape presumably follows in part from Nicholl's plan and possibly from the influence of David Matthews, a curator at the Footscray Park, who visited the site to assist in working bees. The plantings extant are mixed native and exotic planting (banksia, moonah, sheoak, drosera and orchids, and typical exotics such as Pinus canariensis, red box, Raphiolepis indica, cordyline, Cedrus atlantica f.glauca, and a rare and mature Syncarpia glomulifera. This mixture may be the result of Nicholls' 'botanical garden' or this may refer to the adjoining bushland area to the north.

Camp Manyung is historically significant for its ability to demonstrate the beginnings of holiday / recreation camps in Victoria in the interwar period, as an early and substantial example of the type. It is the second oldest YMCA Camp in the State, and illustrates the educative and community philosophies of the YMCA camps, influenced by American models. This is demonstrated by the open-air character of the layout, the integration with nature through the re-vegetation of the site, the provision of sporting facilities and a chapel.

=== Program ===
The camp can accommodate up to 112 people and features various room sizes, shared wheelchair accessible ensuite bathrooms, a dining room and recreation room. A separate cottage is available for camp leaders and educators. An inclusive separate house can accommodate groups of 36 people. Site facilities include sports courts, meeting rooms, an outdoor chapel and amphitheatre.

The program is extensive an includes beach games, flying fox, giant swing, kayaking, marine discovery, tree top challenge, and raft-building, amongst others.

== See also ==
- Architecture of Melbourne
- List of places on the Victorian Heritage Register in the Shire of Mornington Peninsula
