= HSwMS Virgo =

HSwMS Virgo is the name of the following ships of the Swedish Navy

- HSwMS Virgo (1902), a 1.-class torpedo boat
- HSwMS Virgo (T126), a Spica-class torpedo boat launched in 1966 and decommissioned 1989

== See also ==
- Virgo (disambiguation)
