= Virgo (surname) =

The surname Virgo appears to have several derivations, all from the Latin word Virgo meaning virgin or maiden. One relates to actors who played the part of a woman in a play. Another is a nickname for a shy or girlish young man, or possibly ironically for a lecher. The third relates to the offspring of medieval clergy.

The first recorded Virgo was recorded in the Hundred Rolls essentially the census of 1273.

The name occurs most commonly in the English counties of Sussex, Kent and Gloucester.

In France the name most commonly occurs around Cahors, one of the centres of French Protestantism with roots back the days of the Cathars and the Avignon Papacy and the clusters in England, particularly that around the Forest of Dean, relate to locations where Huguenot communities are known to have grouped after fleeing from religious persecution in France.

== Notable people ==
- Adam Virgo, footballer
- Clement Virgo, Canadian film and television director
- Graham Virgo, legal academic
- J. J. Virgo, Australian YMCA official
- Jason Virgo, Australian politician
- John Virgo (1946–2026), English snooker player and commentator
- Sam Virgo, Australian rules footballer
- Terry Virgo, founder of Newfrontiers family of churches
