= ZENN Motor Company =

Canadian electric vehicle company

- Formerly: Feel Good Cars
- Industry: Automotive
- Founded: 2000; 26 years ago
- Founder: Ian Clifford; Marek Warunkiewicz; Probyn Gayle
- Defunct: 2015; 11 years ago
- Fate: Name changed
- Successor: EEStor Corporation
- Headquarters: Canada
- Products: Electric vehicles

ZENN Motor Company was a Canadian-based company that previously developed small lead-acid electric vehicles that were suitable for the neighborhood electric vehicle (NEV) market. The company name is an acronym for Zero Emissions No Noise. Zenn produced its last vehicle in 2010. Since then, the company has changed its name to EEStor Corporation and no longer builds or produces vehicles.

== History and Status ==
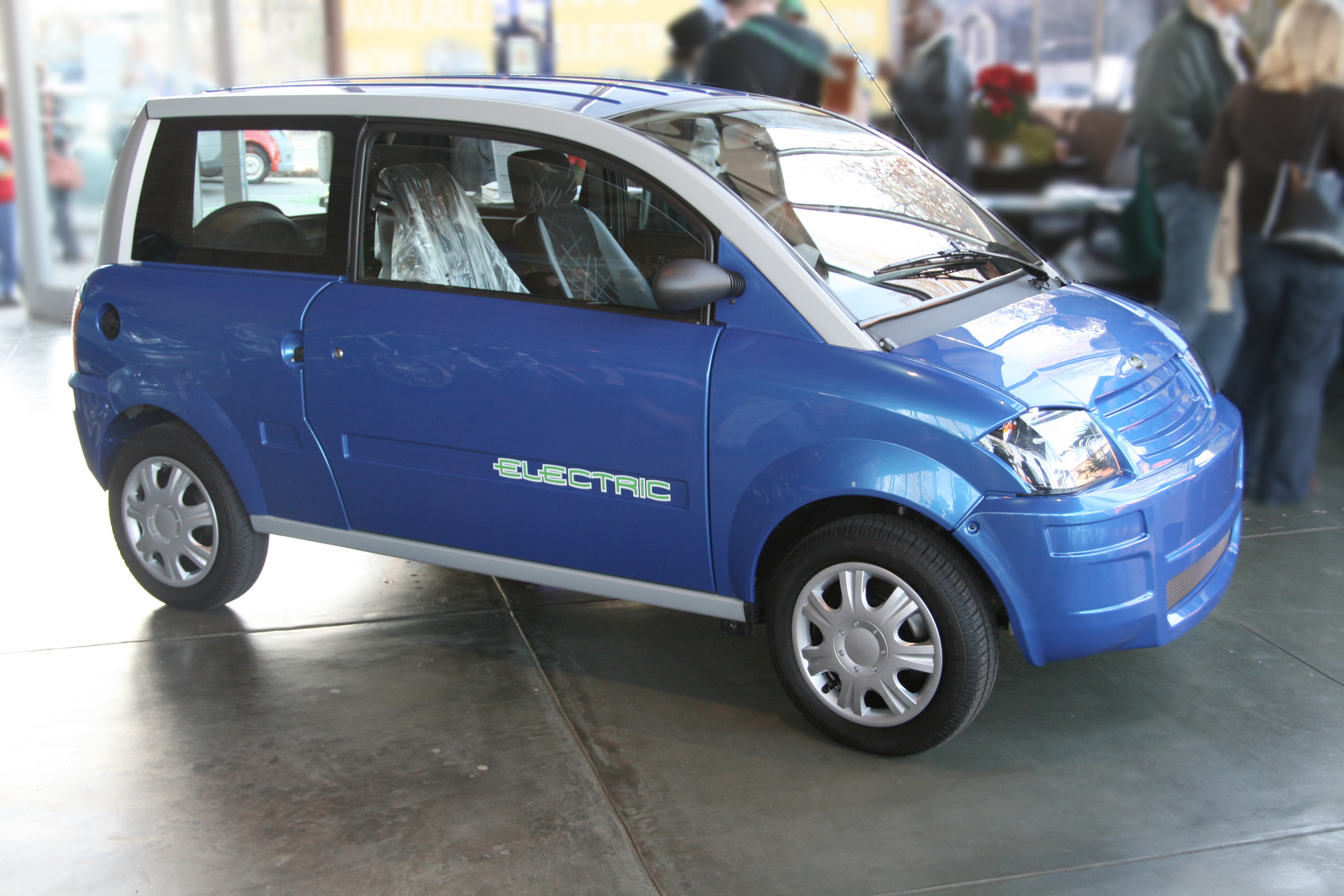
ZENN NEV.

Ian Clifford is a professional photographer and a co-founder, along with Marek Warunkiewicz (creative and art director) of digIT Interactive (1993–2000). After digIT was sold, Ian, Marek and Probyn "Bunny" Gayle founded Feel Good Cars, which was later renamed to ZENN Motor Company. The first prototype, a Dauphine Electric was based on the French economy-class combustion-based Renault Dauphine. By 2001 the all-electric prototype went on display at the Toronto International Auto Show. They began using the body of a small, lightweight diesel-powered mini-car from Microcar. They initially acquired 10 Microcar vehicles without any internal combustion components attached (called a "glider"). The glider was fitted with lead-acid batteries and an electric motor to create a NEV product.

For the fiscals years 2008 and 2009, ZENN sold 360 ZENN NEVs at a company-wide cost of $65,000 for each $15,000 NEV sold.

In 2004, ZENN signed an agreement with EEStor who was seeking investment to produce ultra-capacitors that could replace batteries and revolutionize the EV industry. The well-known venture capital firm KPCB invested $3 million in EEStor in 2005 for approximately 20% ownership. EEStor is a private company, so the KPCB investment resulted in public investors being more interested in ZENN as a way to invest in the EEStor technology. Amendments to the 2004 agreement and a milestone in 2007 resulted in ZENN acquiring a 3.8% ownership of EEStor for $2.5 million. Exclusive rights to the technology in small vehicles were also acquired. EEStor stated delivery of the first units to ZENN would occur by the end of 2007 (see EEStor article). Delivery was also scheduled for 2008 and 2009. In 2007, 2008, and 2009, ZENN received $34 million from stock offerings and paid $10 million to EEStor in accordance with their 2007 agreement. ZENN now has a 10.7% ownership of EEStor stock. As of August 1, 2010, ZENN has not received a prototype from EEStor.

In 2009 and 2010, ZENN canceled production of their vehicles and released employees to conserve cash. ZENN's remaining business is focused on the EEStor technology and their rights to it. In April 2012, the company raised CAN$2 million from investors primarily on the promise of EEstor's technology.

In 2013, KPCB sold much or all of its remaining stake in EEStor to ZENN.

In 2015, ZENN changed its name to EESTor Corporation.
