= EEStor =

Company based in Cedar Park, Texas, US

FuelPositive Corporation (formerly EEStor) is a company based in Cedar Park, Texas, United States that claims to have developed a solid state polymer capacitor for electricity storage. The company claims the device stores more energy than lithium-ion batteries at a lower cost than lead-acid batteries used in gasoline-powered cars. Such a device would revolutionize the electric car industry. Many experts believe these claims are not realistic and EEStor has yet to publicly demonstrate these claims. The corporate slogan is "Energy Everywhere".

== Claimed specifications ==
The claims are described in detail in several of the company's patents.

The following is how EEStor's energy storage device (sometimes referred to the EESU) is claimed to compare to electrochemical batteries used for electric cars:

	EEStor's EESU	NiMH	Lead-acid (Gel)	Lithium-ion
Weight (kg/lbs)	135/300	780/1716	1660/3646	340/752
Volume (litres/cubic inches)	74.5/4541	293/17,881	705/43,045	93.5/5697
Volumetric Energy Density (W⋅h/L)	700	300	110	676
Gravimetric Energy Density (W⋅h/kg)	385	120	42	243
Self-discharge rate	0.02%/30 days	5%/30 days	1%/30 days	1%/30 days
EV Charging time (full) – 100% charge	3–6 min	> 3.0 h	3–15 h	> 3.0 h
Cycle Life (80% discharge)	1 million	300	600	1000
Life Reduced with deep cycle use	none	very high	high	very high
Hazardous Materials	none	yes	yes	yes
Temperature vs. effect on energy storage	negligible	high	very high	high

- No degradation from charge/discharge cycles

== Status and delays ==
Several delays in production occurred and there has not been a public demonstration of the uniquely high energy density claims of the inventors. This has led to the speculation that the claims are false. In January 2007 EEStor stated in a press release "EEStor, Inc. remains on track to begin shipping production 15 kilowatt-hour Electrical Energy Storage Units (EESU) to ZENN Motor Company in 2007 for use in their electric vehicles." In September 2007, EEStor co-founder Richard Weir told CNET production would begin in the middle of 2008. In August 2008, it was reported he stated "as soon as possible in 2009". ZENN Motor Company (ZMC) denied there was a delay, just a clarification of the schedule, separating "development" and "commercialization". In March 2008 Zenn stated in a quarterly report a "late 2009" launch was scheduled for an EEStor-enabled EV. In December 2009 Zenn announced that production of the lead acid based ZENN LSV would end April 30, 2010. At that time Zenn did not announce a date for production of an EEstor based car.

In July 2009 ZENN Motor Company invested an additional $5 million in EEStor, increasing its share of ownership to 10.7%. A Zenn press release indicates they were able to get a 10.7% stake because other EEStor investors did not increase their stake.

In a press release dated February 2021, the company announced it was changing its name to "Fuelpositive Corporation".

== Skepticism from experts and lack of demonstrated claims ==
EEStor's claims for the EESU exceed by orders of magnitude the energy storage capacity of any capacitor currently sold. Many in the industry have expressed skepticism about the claims. Jim Miller, vice president of advanced transportation technologies at Maxwell Technologies and capacitor expert, stated he was skeptical because of current leakage typically seen at high voltages and because there should be microfractures from temperature changes. He stated "I'm surprised that Kleiner has put money into it."

EEStor's claims for the comprehensive permittivity, breakdown strength, and leakage performance of their dielectric material far exceeded those understood to be consistent with the fundamental physical capabilities of any known elemental material or composite structure. For example, the thermochemical theory of polar molecular bond strengths has been confirmed to be valid for a wide range of low-$\kappa$ thru high-$\kappa$ paraelectric materials, and shows that there exists a near universal inverse relationship ($\beta \propto \kappa^{-1/2}$) between a material's permittivity ($\kappa$) and its intrinsic (i.e. defect-free, and thus likely optimal) breakdown strength ($\beta$).

== Patent description and claims ==
EEStor reports a large relative permittivity (19818) at an unusually high electric field strength of 350 MV/m, giving 10^{4} J/cm^{3} (10^{3} W⋅h/L) in the dielectric. Voltage independence of permittivity was claimed up to 500 V/μm to within 0.25% of low voltage measurements. Variation in permittivity at a single voltage for 10 different components was claimed by measurements in the patent to be less than ±0.15%. If true, their capacitors store at least 30 times more energy per volume than (other) cutting-edge methods such as nanotube designs by Dr Schindall at M.I.T., Dr. Ducharme's plastics research, and breakthrough ceramics discussed by Dr. Cann. Northrop Grumman and BASF have also filed patents with similar theoretical energy density claims.

The EEStor patents cite a journal article and a Philips Corporation patent as exact descriptions of its "calcined composition-modified barium titanate powder."

EEStor's US patent 7033406 mentions aluminum oxide and calcium magnesium aluminosilicate glass as coatings, although their subsequent US patent 7466536 mentions only aluminum oxide.

EEStor's latest (2016) US patent WO2016094310 mentions a polymer matrix which can include epoxy and ceramic powders including composition modified barium titanate (CMBT). The patent also mentions a layer thickness of 0.1 microns to 100 microns. It also indicates the CMBT particle density in the polymer matrix can be up to 95%. Phase 4 and Phase 5 testing reports used an epoxy/CMBT solution. More recent testing reports from March 2017 are showing samples with CMBT ratios of over 80% and in that same report EEStor mentions plans for near term samples with thickness of 70 microns with plans for greater levels of densification with near complete densification. A targeted near term goal of 110 W⋅h/L energy density 70 micron layer is in development currently.

== Partnerships ==
In July 2005, Kleiner Perkins Caufield & Byers invested $3 million in EEStor.

In April 2007, ZENN Motor Company, a Canadian electric vehicle manufacturer, invested $2.5 million in EEStor for 3.8% ownership and exclusive rights to distribute their devices for passenger and utility vehicles weighing up to 1400 kg (excluding capacitor mass), along with other rights. In July 2009, Zenn invested another $5 million for a 10.7% stake. A Zenn press release indicates they were able to get a 10.7% stake because other EEStor investors did not increase their stake. In December 2009 Zenn canceled plans for the car but plans to supply the drive train. By April 2010, Zenn had cancelled all production of electric vehicles, leaving ownership of EEStor and their rights to the technology as their focus. Zenn raised CAD$2 million in April 2012, mostly on the promise of EEStor's technology.

In January 2008, Lockheed-Martin signed an agreement with EEStor for the exclusive rights to integrate and market EESU units in military and homeland security applications. In December 2008, a patent application was filed by Lockheed-Martin that mentions EEStor's patent as a possible electrical energy storage unit.

In September 2008, Light Electric Vehicles Company announced an agreement with EEStor to exclusively provide EEStor's devices for the two and three wheel market.

On December 30, 2013, ZENN announces completion of the purchase of Series A preferred shares of EEStor (includes Kleiner Perkins Caufield & Byers shares and other private holders shares) and the associated rights for US$1.5 million which gives ZENN a total ownership of 41% in EEStor.

On May 8, 2014, ZENN and EEStor complete an exchange offer which gives ZENN a total ownership of 71.3% in EEStor. Following the ZENN controlling ownership on May 19, Ian Clifford assumes role of CEO following the resignation of James Kofman.

ZENN Motor Company Inc. has changed its name to "EEStor Corporation" to better reflect the focus and activities of the company. The name change was approved by shareholders at the company's annual and special meeting held on March 31, 2015. EEStor Corporation formerly (ZENN Motor Company) publicly trades on the Canadian exchanges as symbol ESU and on the US stock exchanges as OTC stock symbol ZNNMF. EEStor Corporation holds 71% equity while the other percent is held privately.
