= Moonah =

Moonah may refer to:

- Moonah, Tasmania, Australia, a suburb
- Melaleuca lanceolata, a species of tree
- Melaleuca preissiana, another species of tree
- Moonah Links, a golf course
