= J. J. Virgo =

Australian YMCA director (1865–1956)

John James Virgo (22 April 1865 – 2 August 1956), invariably referred to as J. J. Virgo, was an Australian musician and youth leader who became internationally known as a director of the Young Men's Christian Association (YMCA).

== History ==
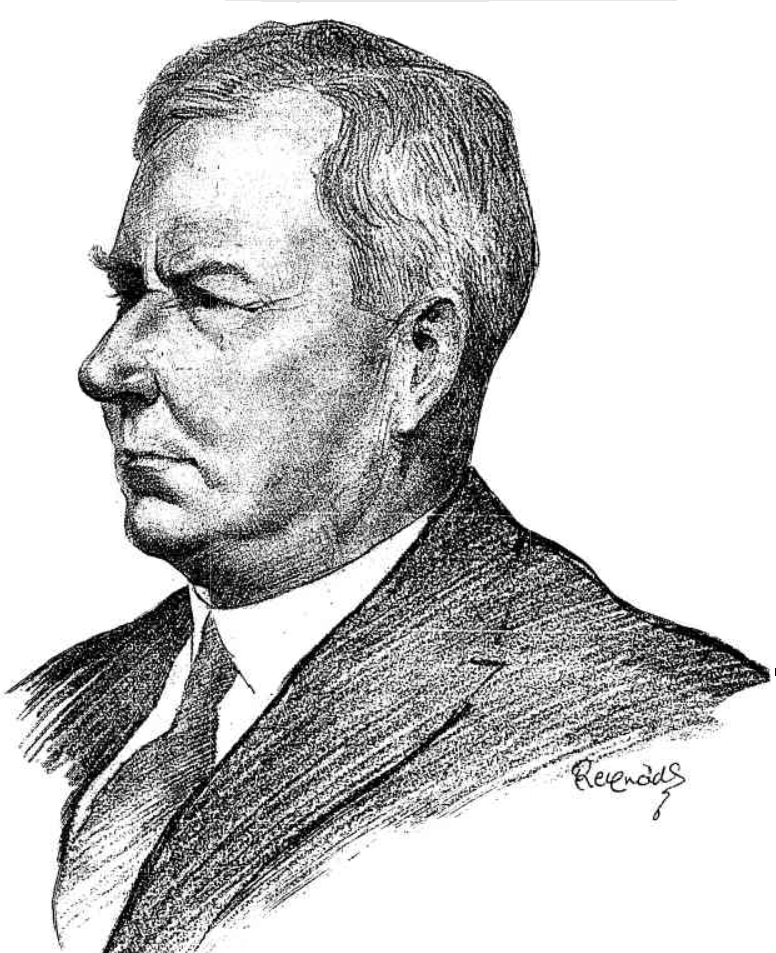
John James Virgo 1929

Virgo was born in Glenelg, South Australia, a son of Caleb Virgo (1842–1885) and Mary Virgo, née Swan, who married in 1864. He was a grandson of James Virgo (died 1899), a pioneer of Glenelg and of South Australia. He was educated at Glenelg Grammar School, and found early employment as a clerk.

He subscribed to the ethic of muscular Christianity, and was one of its foremost exponents: he loved (Australian rules) football and cricket, lacrosse and even boxing, though disapproving of it as a spectator sport. He was a fine baritone singer, but most enjoyed coaching singers and conducting choirs. An advocate for self-improvement, Virgo was the founding secretary of the Glenelg Literary Association and an energetic member of the South Australian Literary Societies' Union.

In 1886 he was appointed General Secretary of the South Australia branch of the Young Men's Christian Association (YMCA), following the conviction of his predecessor, Alex. Walker, for embezzling funds. In 1888 the YMCA established Our Boys Institute for boys 13 to 18 years of age. For young men, activities included Bible classes, sporting teams, lectures, debating and choral societies, a gymnasium, camps and an employment and immigration department. Virgo was prominent in Adelaide's religious life and conducted evangelistic services on Sunday evenings at the Theatre Royal in Hindley Street.

In 1900 a new position was created by the Australian YMCA conference, a three-year outreach and development officer, to establish YMCA outposts in all country towns. Virgo was appointed to the post.

In 1903 he succeeded David Walker as general secretary of the YMCA in Sydney, and the Association's British and Colonial representative. In addition to these duties, he acted as master of the Christian Endeavour choir, and was appointed that association's musical director. This was a period of expansion and great interest in the Y.M.C.A., and Virgo was given much of the credit.

In 1911 he accepted a position as general manager of YMCA in London, the headquarters of the organisation.

In 1916 he was appointed national field secretary, which gave full vent to his organising ability. He left for America, where he raised £20,000,000 for Y.M.C.A. war work.

At some stage he ceased being a paid employee of the Association, but continued working for them without pay.

Virgo resigned in London in April 1925. At a celebratory luncheon, Virgo was praised for his 14 years' service to the Association in Adelaide, 10 in Sydney, but particularly for his postwar work in Australia, when he defended the Association against allegations of wartime failures, chiefly of the way it ran soldiers' canteens.

== Publication ==
Virgo, John James (1939). Fifty Years of Fishing for Men: Autobiography of John J. Virgo (a former secretary of Y.M.C.A. Adelaide). London: Pilgrim Press.

== Recognition ==
Virgo was appointed CBE in January 1918.

== Family ==
Virgo married Lucy Stapleton Crabb (died 1915) in 1886; Their children include:

- Ruby Virgo (28 January 1888 – ) married Alec L. Hinds, general secretary of the Bombay Y.M.C.A. in June 1913.

- daughter (born 20 December 1915)
- Howard Virgo Hinds (28 August 1916 – ) married Ida Ruth Brighouse on 6 December 1940.

- Gordon Richard Virgo (27 February 1890 – 1966) married Muriel Jessie Wilson in 1919.
- Charles Horace Virgo (8 December 1891 – 1969)
- Bertram Gilbert Virgo (22 June 1901 – 1964)

He married again in 1920, to Emmeline Dorothy Aston, daughter of a minister of religion.
