= Microcar (brand) =

French microcar manufacturer

- Type: Subsidiary
- Industry: Automotive
- Founded: 1980; 46 years ago
- Founder: Jeanneau
- Defunct: 2025
- Fate: Merged with Automobiles Ligier in 2014, brand discontinued in 2025
- Headquarters: Les Herbiers, France
- Products: Quadricycle
- Parent: Ligier
- Website: www.ligier.fr/voiture-sans-permis/microcar/

Microcar was a French microcar manufacturer. The company was founded in 1980 as a division of Jeanneau, a major sailboat manufacturer. Production moved to a new custom-built factory in September 2000. In September 2008, Microcar was acquired by Ligier Automobiles in a deal backed by the Italian private equity firm 21 Investimenti Partners. The merger created Europe's second-biggest manufacturer of microcars, and largest maker of quadricycles, or "sans permis" (license-exempt) vehicles. The Microcar and Ligier brands were to retain their separate identities and production facilities. Phillipe Ligier, son of company founder Guy Ligier, is CEO of the expanded Ligier Automobiles.

In 2024, Ligier announced plans to discontinue the Microcar brand in order to consolidate business for the Ligier main brand as the company struggled with increased competition in the microcar market. In early 2025, the Microcar factory in Montaigu was closed down.

== Current models ==
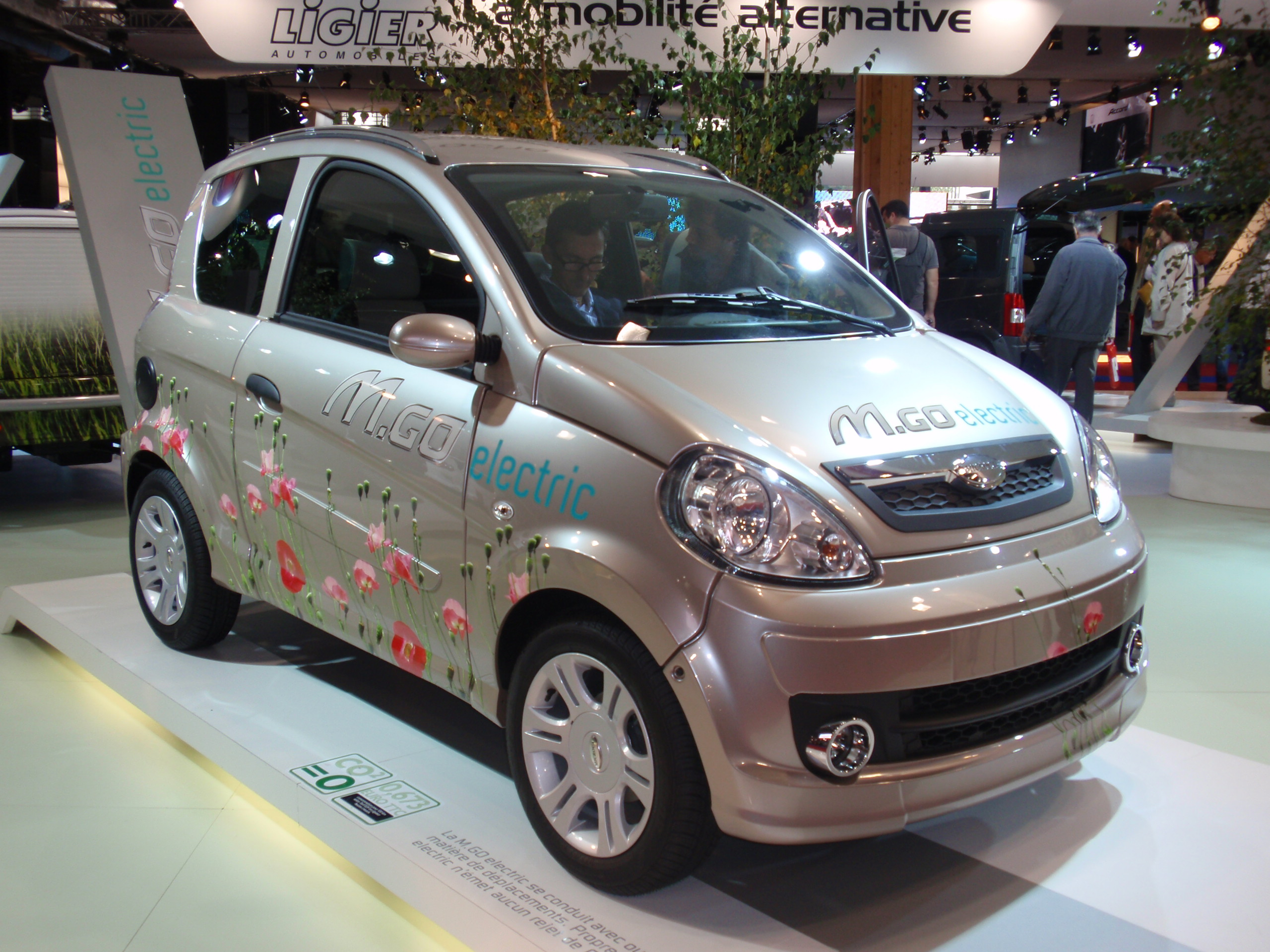
Microcar M.Go Electric at the 2008 Paris Motor Show

The current model range consists of the M.GO-3, introduced (in 2015?) to replace M.Go model introduced in 2009. There are six trim levels, all with petrol engines, in the UK. The M.Go was available in conventional, diesel-engined S, S PACK, MICA, SXI, and Sport trim levels, as well as full electric.

Prior to the M.Go, Microcar was known for their long-running MC Series models, sold as the MC1 and MC2. Both where available as a 2-seat, or 4-seat long wheel base version. The long wheel base being 40mm longer than the short Virgo models. The company also sold a small commercial vehicle called the Sherpa, which was a badge-engineered Ligier X-Pro. The Sherpa was discontinued after the Ligier merger, and the MC has been dropped in favor of the new M.Go. The M.Go was only produced with a petrol engine for the UK market.

== Former models ==
- Microcar Family Luxe
- Microcar Lyra
- Microcar ALCO
- Microcar NewStreet, NewStreet Cabriolet
- Microcar Pratic Luxe
- Microcar Virgo
- Microcar Virgo 2
- Microcar Virgo 3
- Microcar Virgo Luxe

== Electric vehicles ==
From 1994, the Alco electric was built. From 2006 to 2010, the long-wheelbase version of Microcar's MC Series was used as the basis for the ZENN EV assembled in Canada by ZENN Motor Company with an electric drivetrain. It was marketed in the U.S. and Canada under the ZENN brand as a "Neighborhood Electric Vehicle"(NEV), with its top speed governed to 25 mph (40 km/h). Microcar began distributing the ZENN in Europe during 2007 under its own brand, as the Microcar ZENN. ZENN Motor purchased engineless, rolling chassis from Microcar and installed their own electric motor and drivetrain. The ZENNs retailed for $16,900 while actual cost was $65,000. Microcar brought electric vehicle production fully in-house with the M.Go Electric in 2009, and ZENN ceased production of its MC-based vehicle in 2010.

== Gallery ==
=== Current models ===
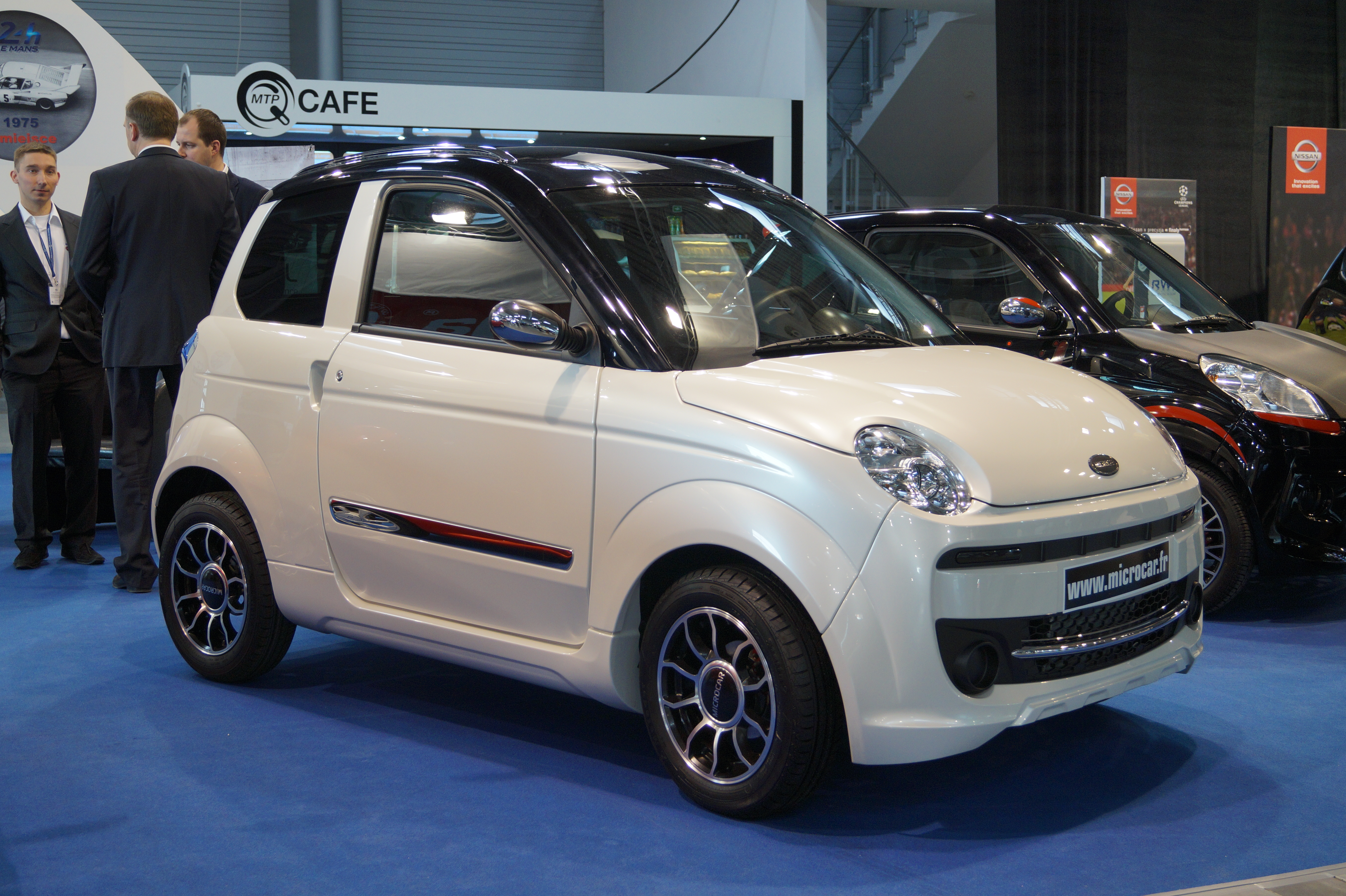
Microcar M.Go 3 Dynamic

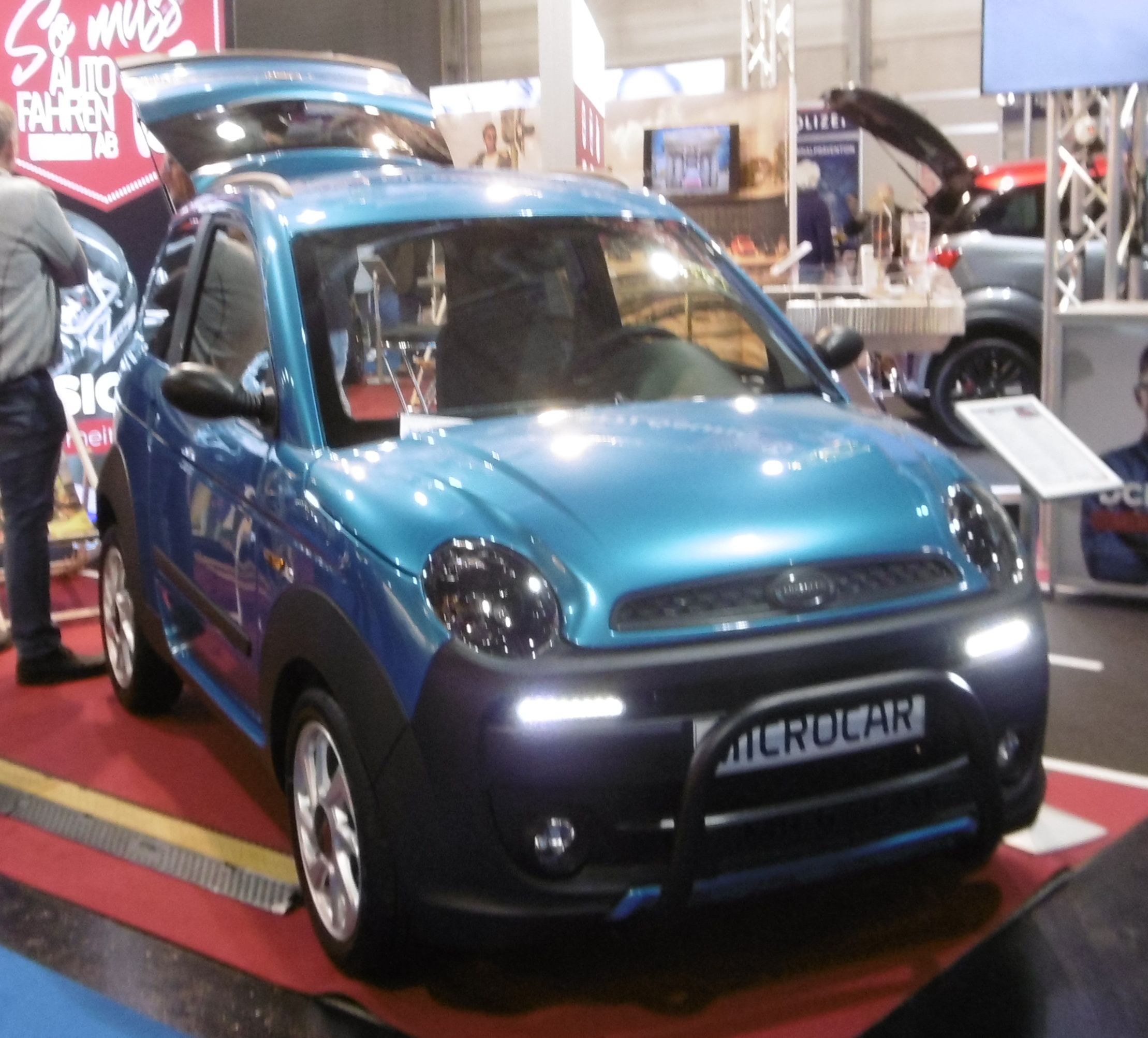
Microcar M.Go Outdoor

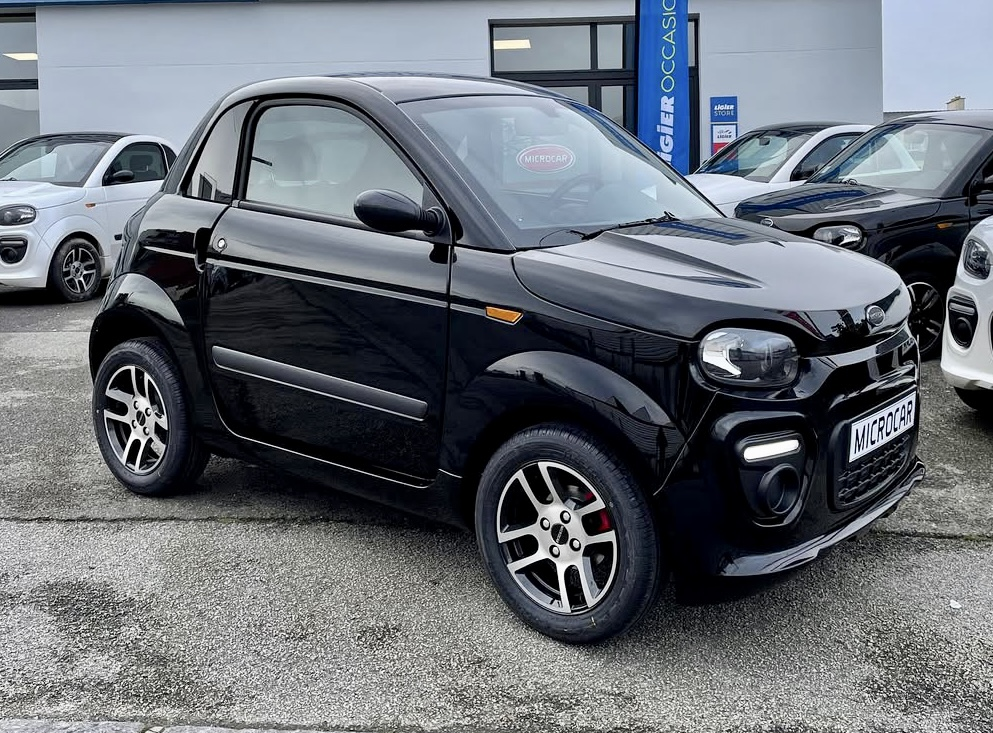
Microcar Dué

=== Past models ===
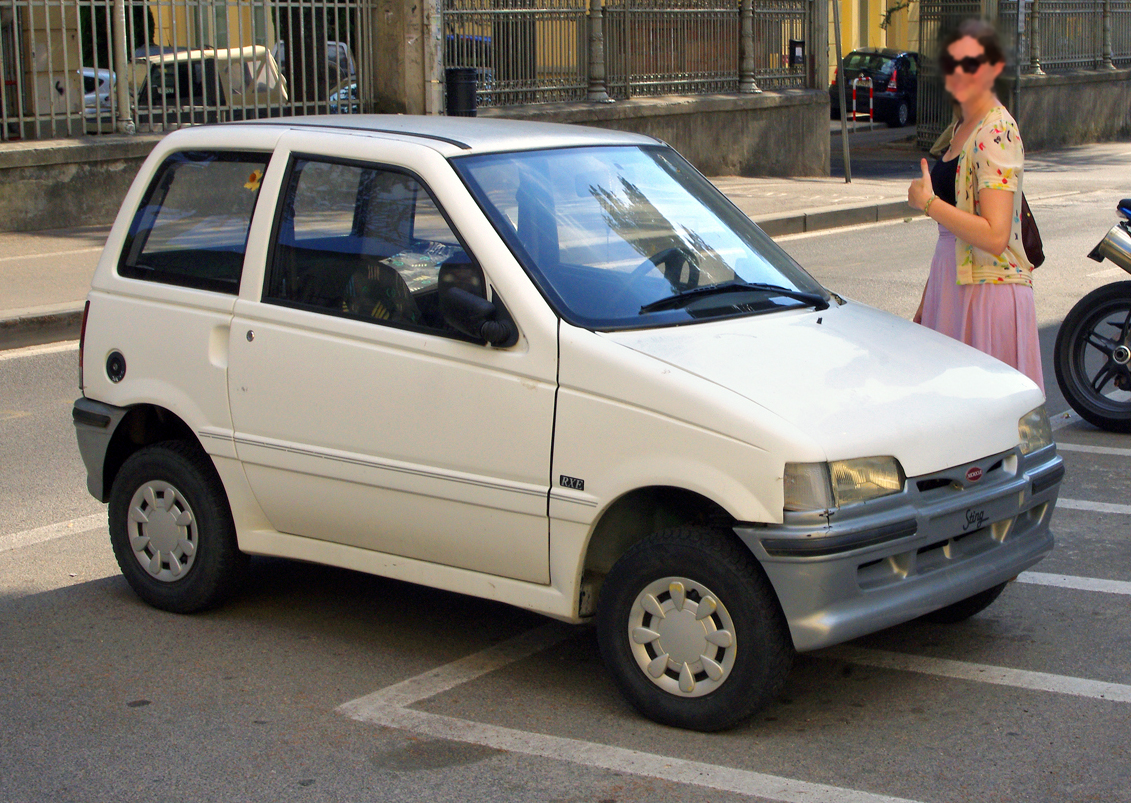
Microcar Lyra RXE

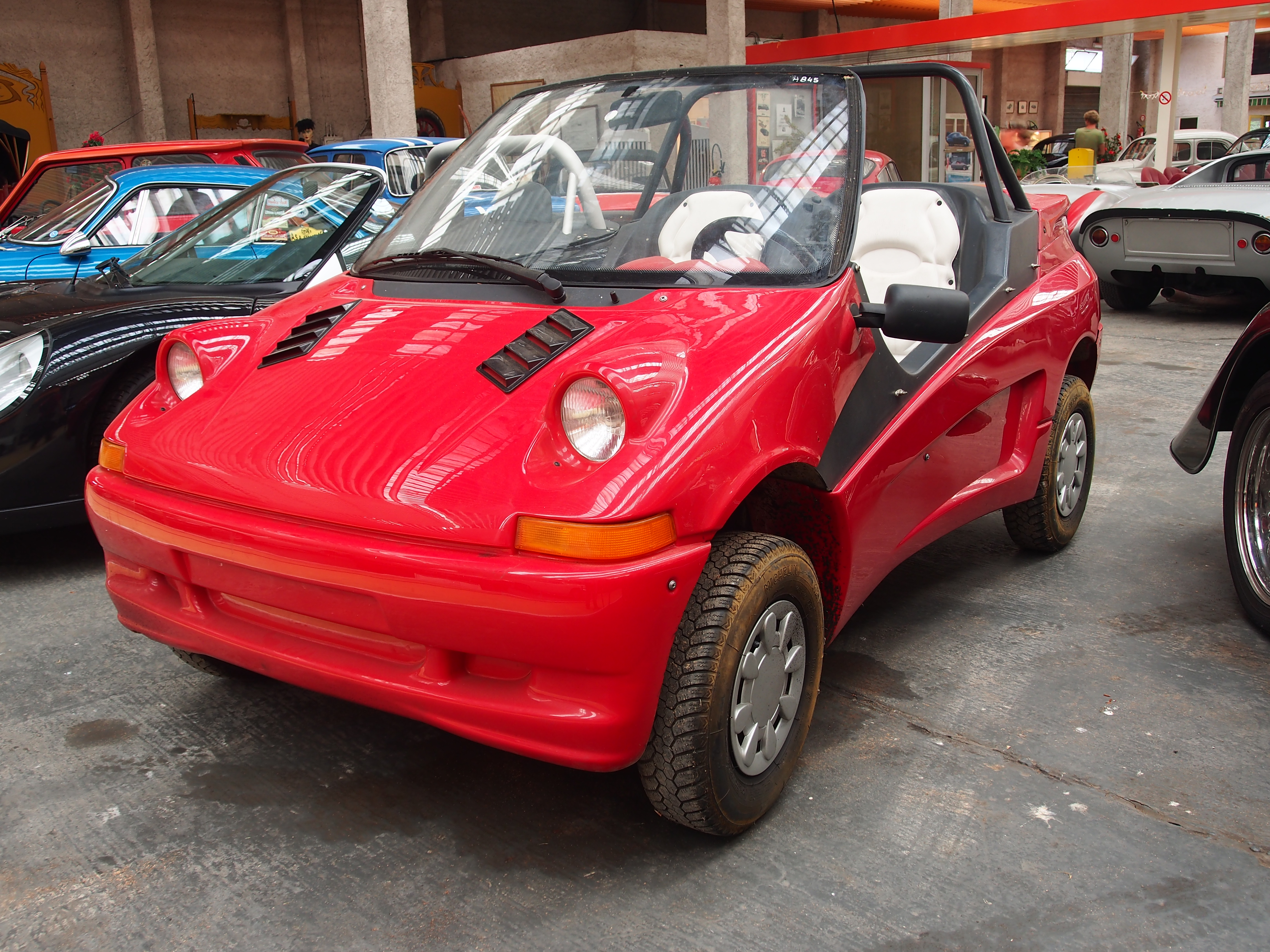
Microcar NewStreet Cabriolet

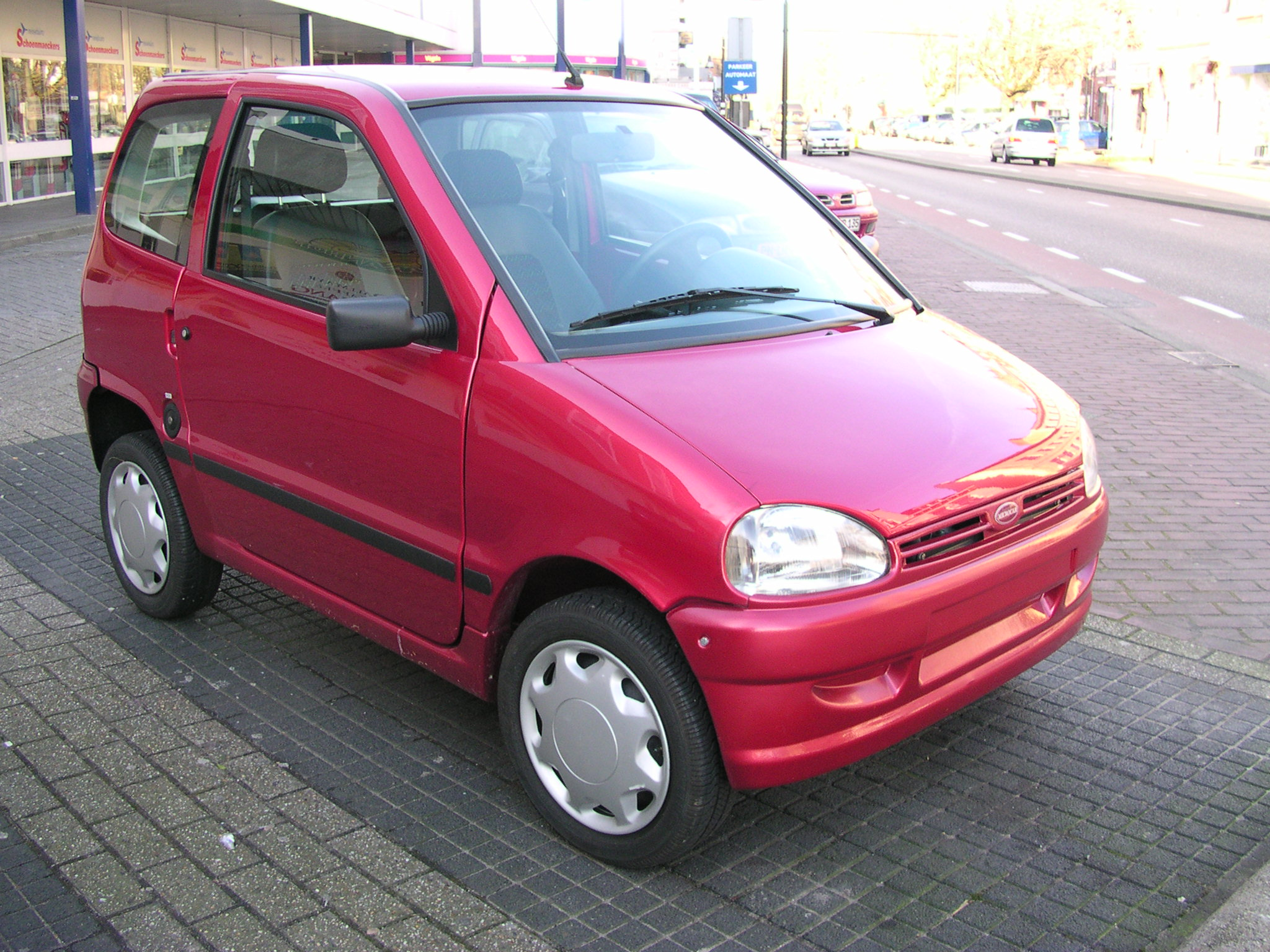
Microcar Virgo 1 Luxe

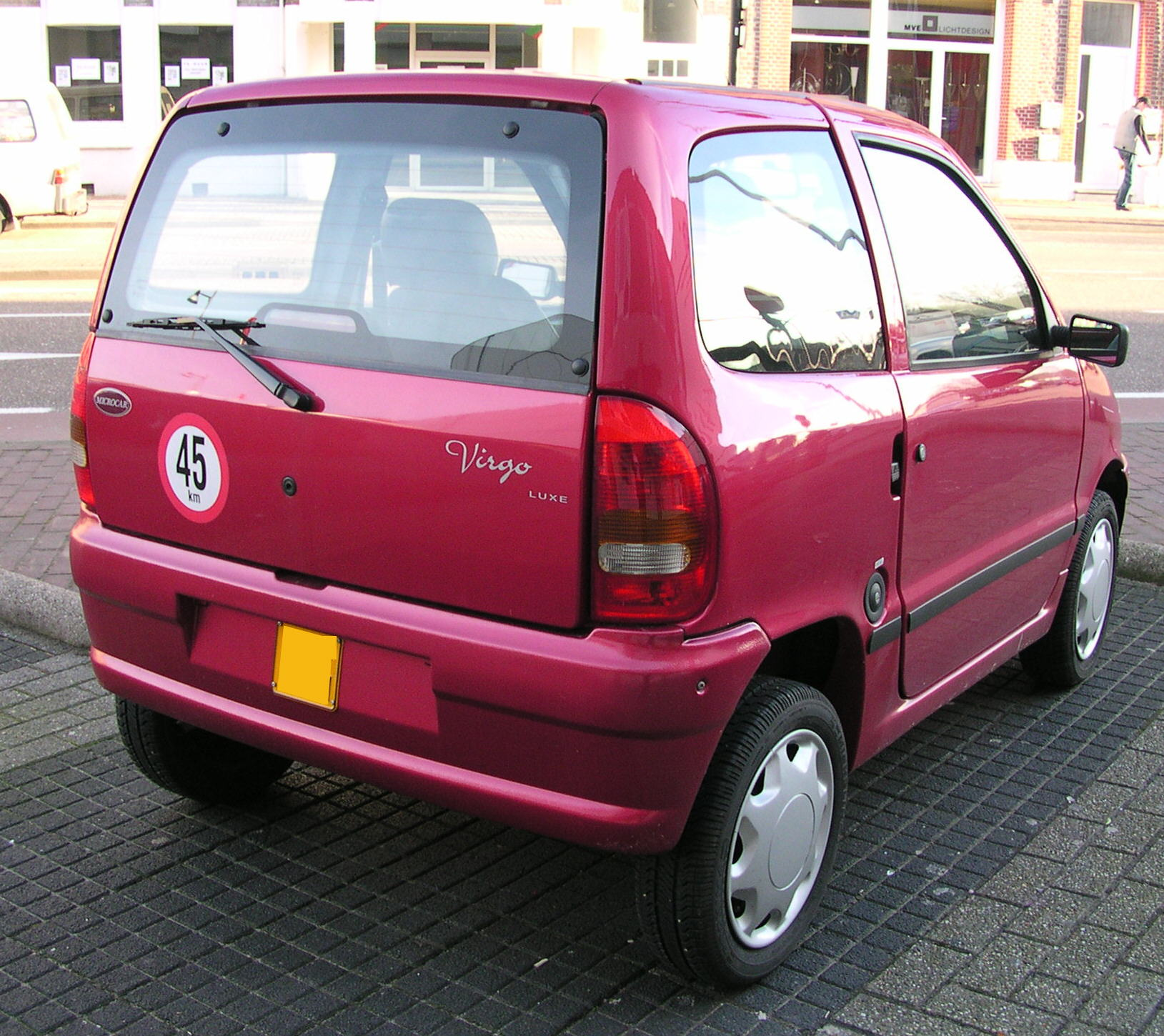
Microcar Virgo 1 Luxe

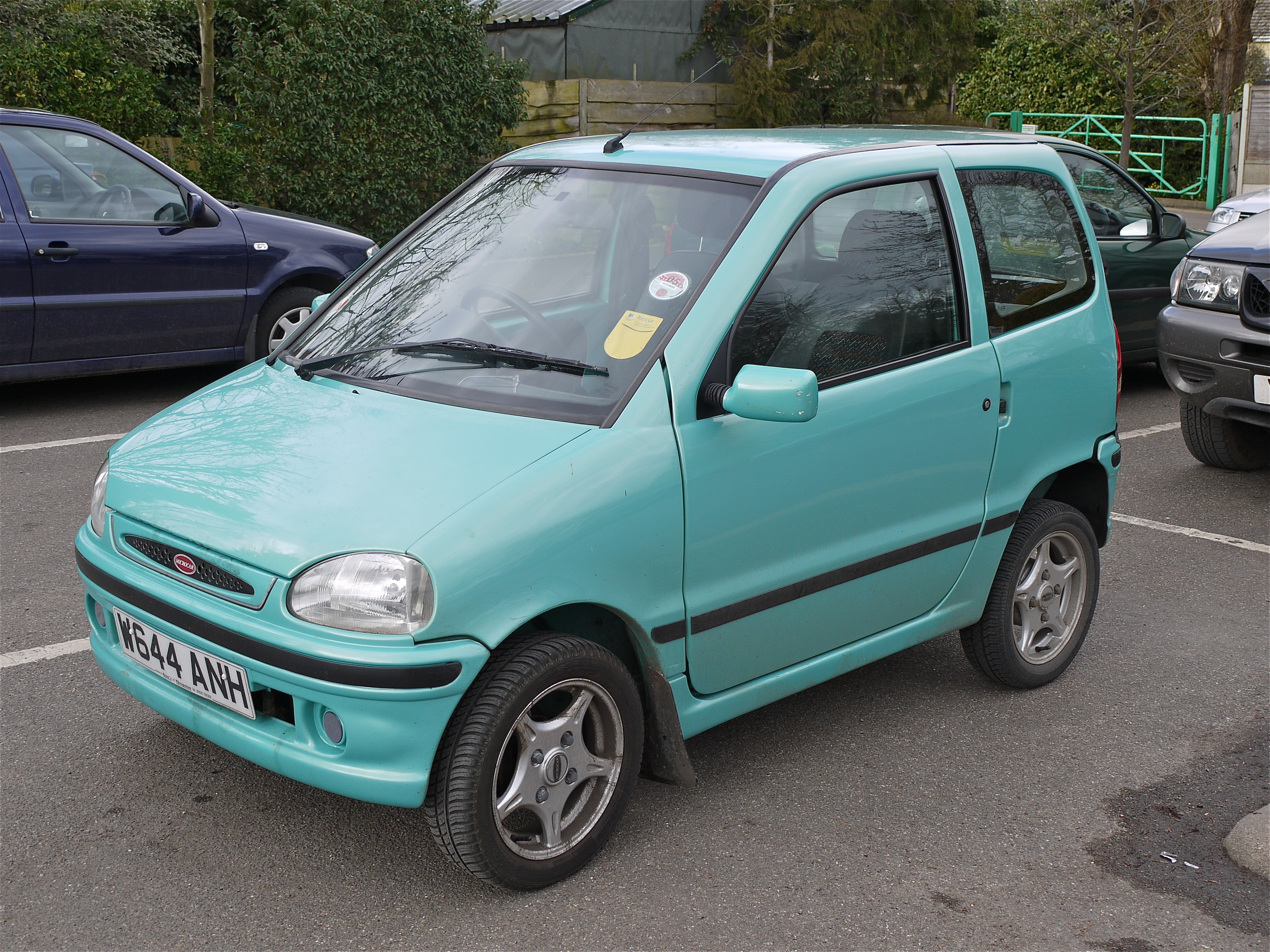
Microcar Virgo 2

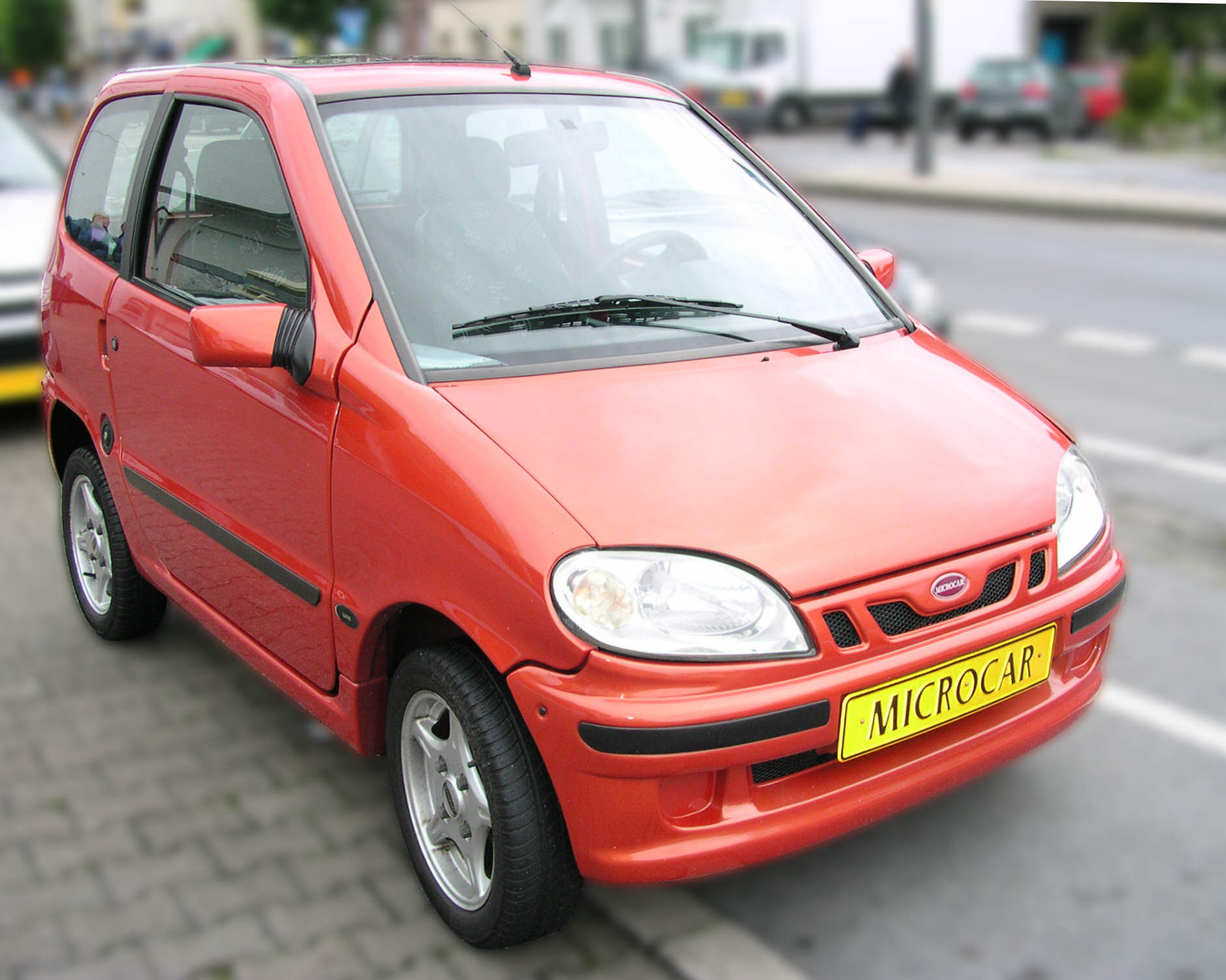
Microcar Virgo 3

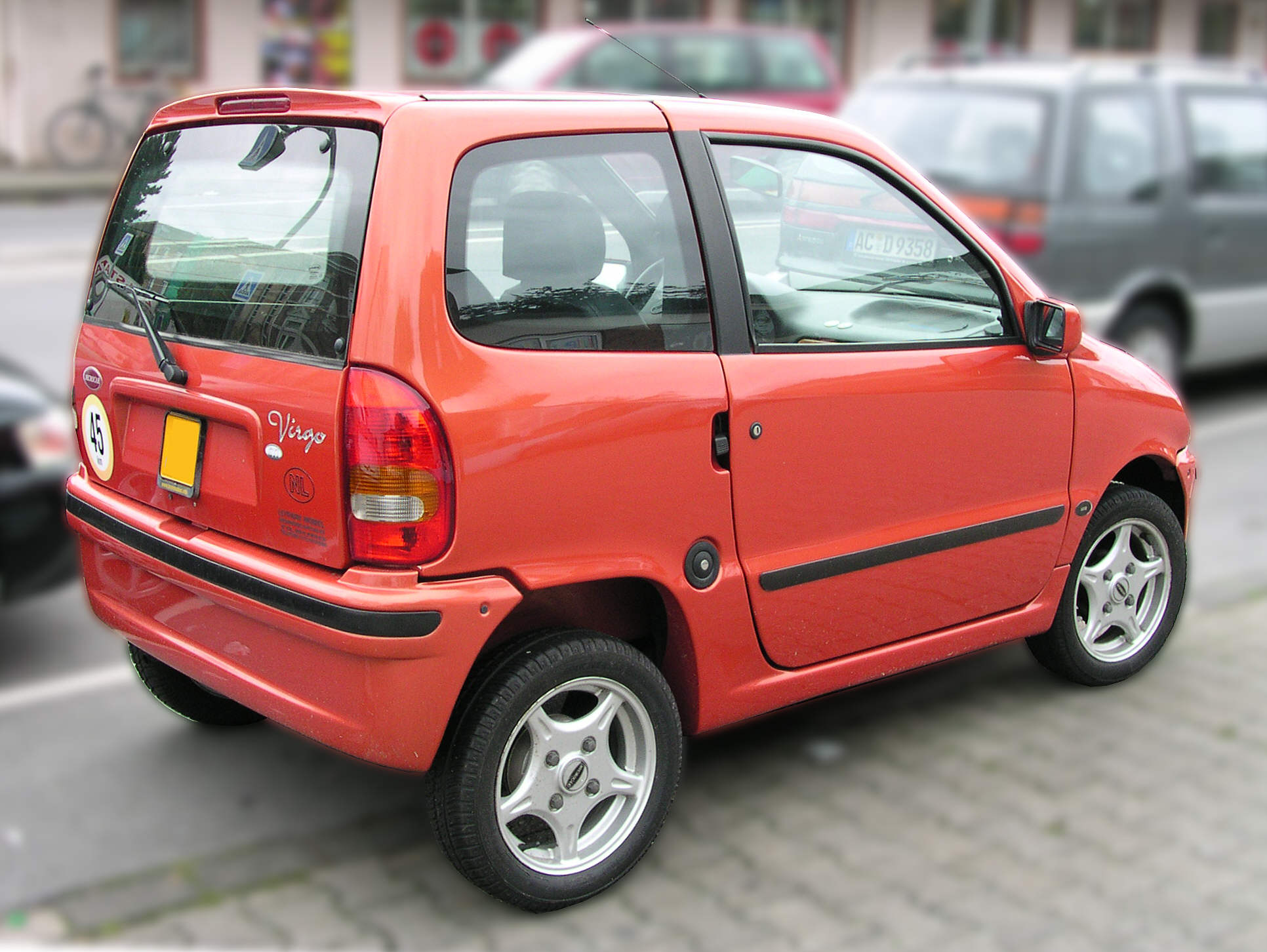
Microcar Virgo 3

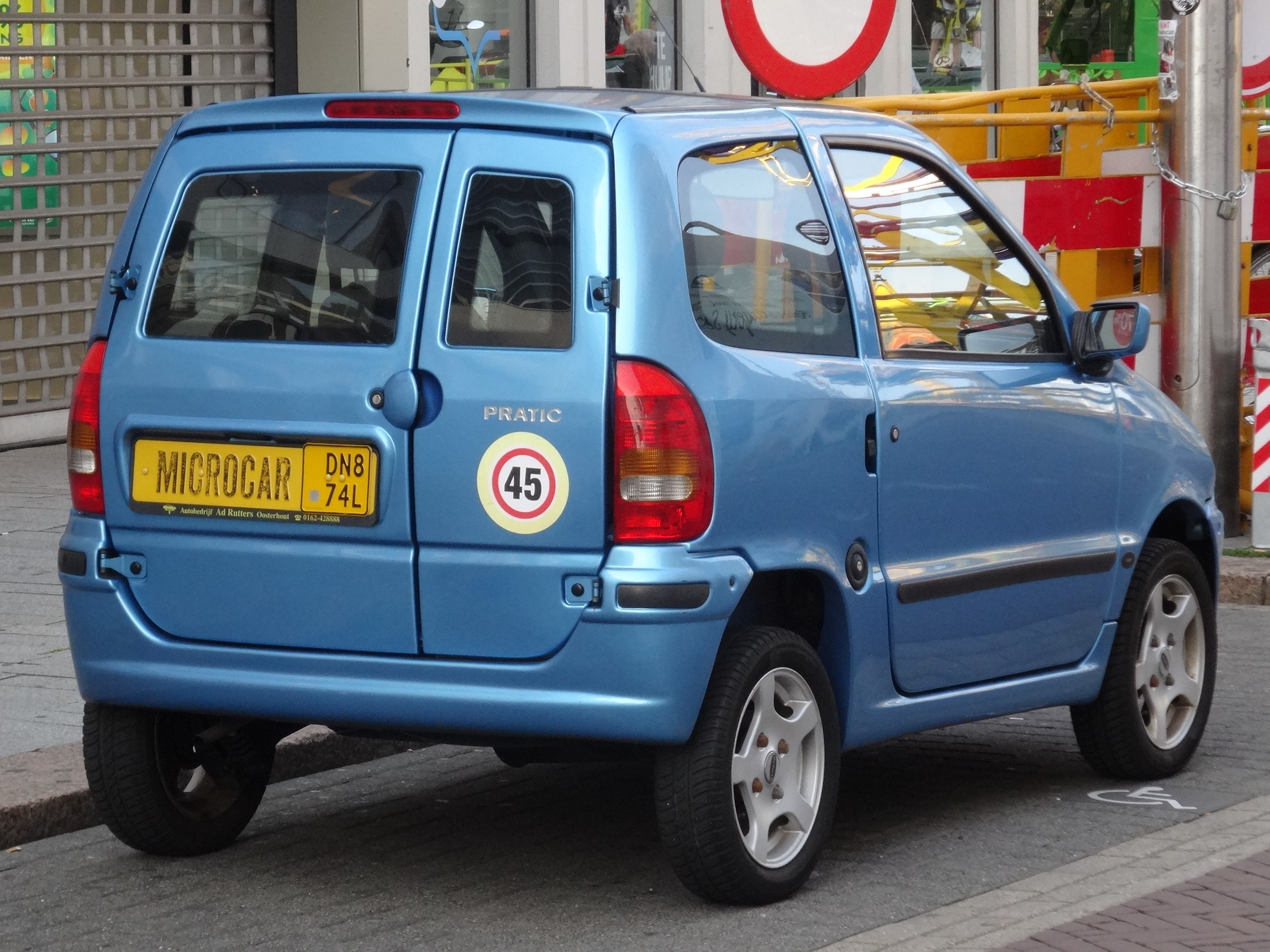
Microcar Virgo 3 Pratic

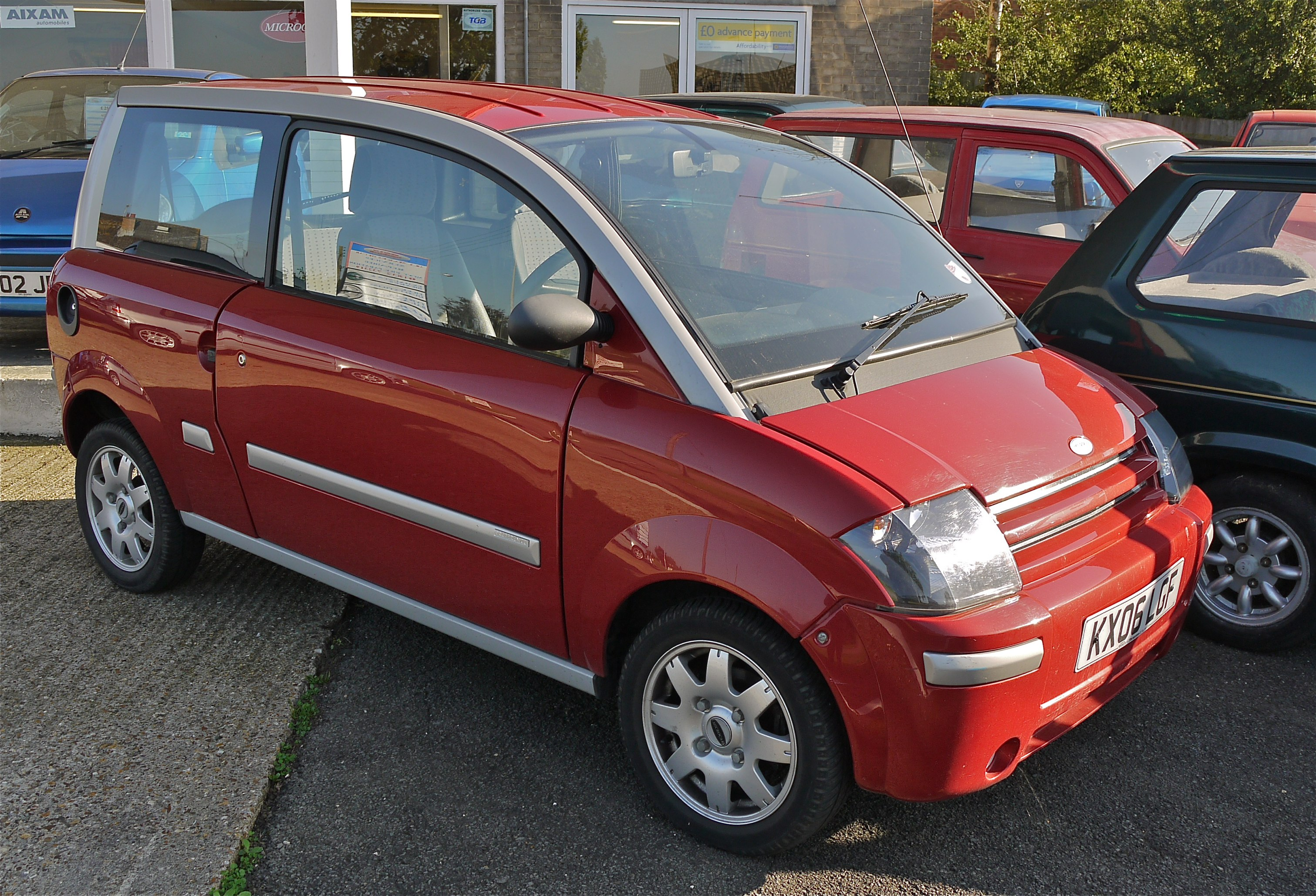
Microcar MC1 Pre-facelift

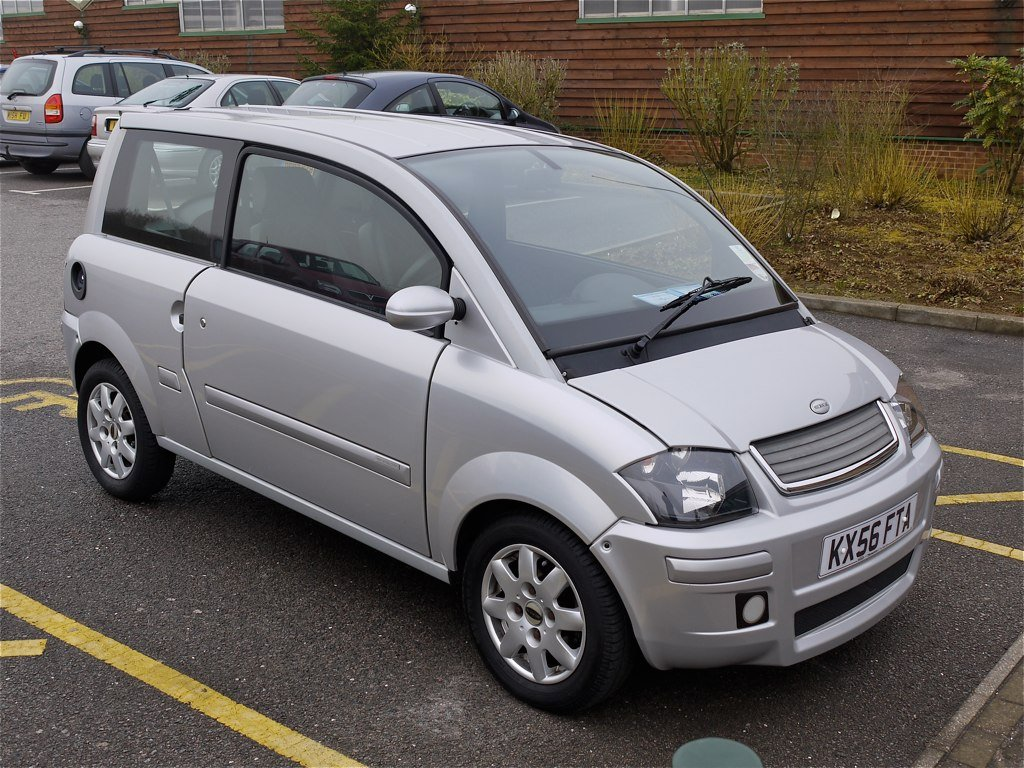
Microcar MC2 Post-facelift

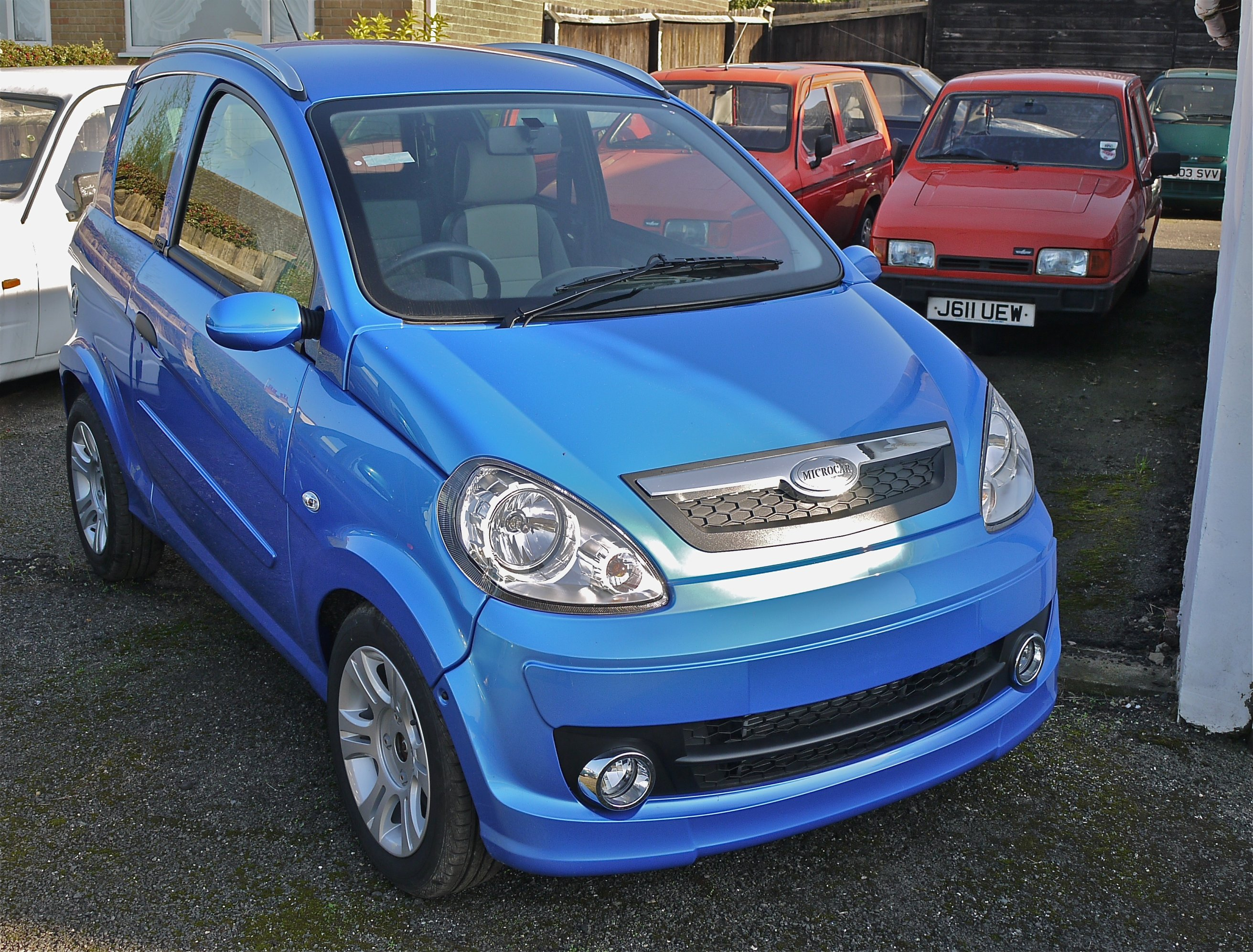
Microcar M.Go 1
