= Ti-Tree =

Ti-Tree may refer to:

- Ti-Tree, Northern Territory, a town and locality in Australia
  - Ti-Tree Airfield
  - Ti-Tree School

== See also ==
- T-tree, in computer science
- Tea tree (disambiguation)
- Tiptree (disambiguation)
