= Duffy's Lime Kiln =

Heritage-listed former lime kiln in Melbourne, Victoria, Australia

- Location of the lime kiln in Greater Metropolitan Melbourne
- Interactive map of the Duffy's Lime Kiln area

General information
- Status: Completed
- Type: Lime kiln
- Location: 7 Merrylands Avenue, Portsea, Mornington Peninsula, Melbourne, Victoria, Australia
- Coordinates: 38°19′28″S 144°44′08″E
- Completed: 1856; 170 years ago
- Closed: c. 1904
- Owner: Charles Duffy

Technical details
- Structural system: Bottle kiln
- Material: Bricks; timber; iron; limestone; mortar; corrugated iron

Victorian Heritage Register
- Official name: Duffy's Lime Kiln
- Type: Registered place
- Designated: 14 June 2001
- Reference no.: H1931
- Heritage overlay no.: HO138
- Category: Manufacturing and Processing

Register of the National Estate
- Official name: Duffys Lime Kiln
- Type: Defunct register
- Designated: undated
- Reference no.: 103000

The Duffy's Lime Kiln is a former lime kiln located at 7 Merrylands Avenue, Portsea, on the Mornington Peninsula, in the outer south-eastern suburbs of Melbourne, in Victoria, Australia. Built in 1856, the kiln fell into disuse between 1899 and 1904.

Located on the traditional lands of the Bunurong people, the lime kiln was added to the Victorian Heritage Register on 14 June 2001 in recognition of its technological, historical and archaeological significance; and was also added to the non-statutory and now defunct Register of the National Estate on an unknown date.

== History ==
Limestone on the Mornington Peninsula was used as early as the Collins Settlement of 1803. The remains of limestone chimneys and a powder magazine, built by the Collins party, was still evident in 1835 when John Pascoe Fawkner returned to the area.

Following Colonial settlement of Port Phillip, the first lime burners were reputedly two men by the names of Kenyon and Rowley. They set up bush kilns in the late 1830s. The first recorded permit for lime burning was issued in 1838. In the 1840s lime burning became the main industry on the Mornington Peninsula, ahead of grazing, cropping and fishing. Settlements closely followed the location of the lime kilns. In the 1830s she-oaks, banksias, and swamp gums dominated the landscape. However these trees proved highly suitable as lime burning fuel, as she-oaks in particular were a reliable, high burning fuel. Denudation of these trees was followed by the growth of the characteristic scrubby undergrowth and tea-trees.

Charles Duffy (later, Sir Charles Duffy) purchased 611 acres (247 ha) from the Crown in 1863 and the kiln was listed on the rate book of the time, together with a four-room house. Duffy was an Irish-born prominent resident on the Mornington Peninsula, a solicitor and politician, elected to the Victorian Parliament in 1856 soon after arriving in the Colony. Duffy later served as the 8th Colonial Premier of Victoria for a year, between 1871 and 1872. Duffy, together with George Selth Coppin, were instrumental in the development of Portsea. Duffy subdivided his property, died in 1903, and his estate sold the residence of the property to James Wright in c. 1910.

Lime produced on the Mornington Peninsula was used in the building trade in Melbourne, especially for the grand Italianate houses, and was of sufficient quality to compete with imports. Patterns of settlement closely followed the location of kilns, for example at Portsea, Sorrento and Rye. The regular trade of lime schooners transporting lime to Melbourne enhanced communications to these relatively remote parts of Victoria.

Duffy's kiln was probably closed down in the period 1899 to 1904, when many kilns were closed on the Mornington Peninsula.

== Description ==
The kiln structure is representative of the bottle kiln type of construction, the most common type of the surviving lime kilns in Victoria.

Duffy's Lime Kiln was constructed into the slope of the backyard of a private beach-front residence. The shaft, 3.5 metres (11 ft) in diameter, is set back one metre (three feet) from the top of the slope, and extends 0.5 metres (2 ft) above ground level in a similar manner to Sullivan's Lime Kiln at Rye. The shaft is constructed of two leaves of handmade bricks and is a straight cylinder with a depth of 7 metres (23 ft) to the characteristic bottle-shape bottom. At the base of the kiln a vaulted section supported by rough timber beams gives access to the draw hole. The draw hole is an arched brick vault with an iron lintel. Construction of the flanking wing walls is of square-cut limestone blocks fixed with sand-lime mortar, and partially bagged.

The corrugated iron roof and a modern deck to provide safe access to the cliff top was constructed over the top of the flanking walls in 1995.

== See also ==
- List of manufacturing plants in Melbourne
- List of places on the Victorian Heritage Register in the Shire of Mornington Peninsula
