= Sullivan's Lime Kiln =

Heritage-listed former lime kiln in Melbourne, Victoria, Australia

- Location of the lime kiln in Greater Metropolitan Melbourne
- Interactive map of the Sullivan's Lime Kiln area

General information
- Status: Completed
- Type: Lime kiln
- Location: 335 Browns Road, Rye, Mornington Peninsula, Melbourne, Victoria, Australia
- Coordinates: 38°23′59″S 144°49′34″E
- Completed: 1855; 171 years ago
- Closed: 1917
- Owner: Charles Duffy

Technical details
- Structural system: Bottle kiln
- Material: Bricks; timber; iron; limestone; mortar; corrugated iron

Victorian Heritage Register
- Official name: Sullivan's Lime Kiln
- Type: Registered place
- Designated: 14 June 2001
- Reference no.: H1930
- Heritage overlay no.: HO34
- Category: Manufacturing and Processing

Register of the National Estate
- Official name: Sullivans Lime Kiln
- Type: Defunct register
- Designated: undated
- Reference no.: 103024

The Sullivan's Lime Kiln is a former lime kiln located at 335 Browns Road, Rye, now the location of The Dunes Golf Links, on the Mornington Peninsula, in the outer south-eastern suburbs of Melbourne, in Victoria, Australia. Built in 1855, the kiln fell into disuse between 1899 and 1904.

Located on the traditional lands of the Bunurong people, the lime kiln was added to the Victorian Heritage Register on 14 June 2001 in recognition of its technological, historical and archaeological significance; and was also added to non-statutory lists by the Victorian branch of the National Trust on 8 November 1992 and the now defunct Register of the National Estate on an unknown date.

== History ==
Limestone on the Mornington Peninsula was used as early as the Collins Settlement of 1803. The remains of limestone chimneys and a powder magazine, built by the Collins party, was still evident in 1835 when John Pascoe Fawkner returned to the area.

Following Colonial settlement of Port Phillip, the first lime burners were reputedly two men by the names of Kenyon and Rowley. They set up bush kilns in the late 1830s. The first recorded permit for lime burning was issued in 1838. In the 1840s lime burning became the main industry on the Mornington Peninsula, ahead of grazing, cropping and fishing. Settlements closely followed the location of the lime kilns. In the 1830s she-oaks, banksias, and swamp gums dominated the landscape. However these trees proved highly suitable as lime burning fuel, as she-oaks in particular were a reliable, high burning fuel. Denudation of these trees was followed by the growth of the characteristic scrubby undergrowth and tea-trees.

The Sullivan family played an important role in the development of the lime burning industry on the Mornington Peninsula. Dennis Sullivan came to Portsea from Melbourne in 1843; and held a grazing licence that covered ten square kilometres (four square miles), from Portsea to Point Nepean. By 1845, Sullivan had built a limestone cottage, that stands in the Quarantine Station area of Point Nepean National Park, and by 1852 he had built a lime kiln in the cliff nearby. Sullivan lost the lease to part of his land in 1852 when the government wanted the land for the new Quarantine Station.

Dennis' son, Patrick, worked at several kilns before establishing this kiln in c. 1855, following the removal of the family from the Quarantine Station area. Patrick Sullivan acquired the freehold to land around the kiln in 1867. His family lived in a house nearby, but moved in 1876 to Cliff House, on the east corner of Napier Street and the Nepean Highway. The family, which owned a number of businesses in Rye, was also an extensive landowner.

Sullivan's kiln was operated for about sixty years in the ownership of the Sullivan family, outlasting many contemporary kiln structures. Patrick's son, James, burned the last load of lime at Sullivan's Kiln in 1917.

Lime produced on the Mornington Peninsula was used in the building trade in Melbourne, especially for the grand Italianate houses, and of sufficient quality to compete with imports. Patterns of settlement closely followed the location of kilns, for example at Portsea, Sorrento, and Rye. The regular trade of lime schooners transporting lime to Melbourne enhanced communications to these relatively remote parts of Victoria.

Sullivan's kiln was probably closed down in 1917, with most of the other kilns closed on the Mornington Peninsula during the 1900s.

== Description ==
The kiln structure is representative of the bottle kiln type of construction, the most common type of the surviving lime kilns in Victoria.

Sullivan's Lime Kiln, located in the grounds of a golf course, is relatively intact and incorporates the general features of a hillside kiln. The cylindrical shaft, approximately seven metres (twenty-three feet) deep, is lined with Hancock brand firebricks. The front and wing walls are constructed of limestone blocks. A series of bush poles corbel out to support the limestone block roof. This gave access to the draw hole, which is now no longer visible, buried beneath the raised ground level surface. The top of the brick shaft stands 0.5 metres (2 ft) above ground level, similar to Duffy's Lime Kiln at Portsea. The pitched roof, which would have spanned the retaining walls, has not survived. This is probably an example of a continuous feed kiln.

== See also ==
- List of manufacturing plants in Melbourne
- List of places on the Victorian Heritage Register in the Shire of Mornington Peninsula
