= Ilyuka Lime Kiln =

Heritage-listed former lime kiln in Melbourne, Victoria, Australia

- Location of Ilyuka in Greater Metropolitan Melbourne
- Interactive map of the Ilyuka Lime Kiln area

General information
- Status: Completed
- Type: Lime kiln and bathing box
- Architectural style: Inter-war Spanish Mission (1929)
- Location: 2–16 Port King Road, Portsea, Mornington Peninsula, Melbourne, Victoria, Australia
- Coordinates: 38°19′29″S 144°44′15″E
- Completed: 1880; 146 years ago
- Renovated: 1928–1929 (as a bathing box)
- Closed: c. 1904 (as a kiln)

Technical details
- Structural system: Bottle kiln
- Material: Bricks; timber; limestone; mortar; corrugated iron

Renovating team
- Architect: Harry Norris (1929)

Victorian Heritage Register
- Official name: Ilyuka Lime Kiln / Bathing Box
- Type: Registered place
- Designated: 23 May 1996
- Reference no.: H1191
- Heritage overlay no.: HO138
- Category: Manufacturing and Processing

Register of the National Estate
- Official name: Ilyuka Lime Kiln
- Type: Defunct register
- Designated: undated
- Reference no.: 103015

The Ilyuka Lime Kiln is a former lime kiln and bathing box, located at 2–16 Port King Road, Portsea, on the Mornington Peninsula, in the outer south-eastern suburbs of Melbourne, in Victoria, Australia. Built from 1880, the kiln fell into disuse between 1890 and 1904 and was repurposed as a bathing box in the late 1920s.

Located on the traditional lands of the Bunurong people, the lime kiln was added to the Victorian Heritage Register on 23 May 1996 in recognition of its historical and architectural significance; and was also added to non-statutory lists by the Victorian branch of the National Trust on 15 April 1992; and now defunct Register of the National Estate on an unknown date.

== History ==
Limestone on the Mornington Peninsula was used as early as the Collins Settlement of 1803. The remains of limestone chimneys and a powder magazine, built by the Collins party, was still evident in 1835 when John Pascoe Fawkner returned to the area.

Following Colonial settlement of Port Phillip, the first lime burners were reputedly two men by the names of Kenyon and Rowley. They set up bush kilns in the late 1830s. The first recorded permit for lime burning was issued in 1838. In the 1840s lime burning became the main industry on the Mornington Peninsula, ahead of grazing, cropping and fishing. Settlements closely followed the location of the lime kilns. In the 1830s she-oaks, banksias, and swamp gums dominated the landscape. However these trees proved highly suitable as lime burning fuel, as she-oaks in particular were a reliable, high burning fuel. Denudation of these trees was followed by the growth of the characteristic scrubby undergrowth and tea-trees.

In 1869, W. A. Blair leased a kiln on his Shelly Beach estate to his son-in-law, Boyd, that is presumably Skelton's kiln. In 1880 Boyd built the kiln at Ilyuka. The kiln is not shown on the 1890 Contour Plan and may not have been operating at this time.

The Ilyuka Lime Kiln was built as a lime kiln in 1880 to a conventional design used for kilns between 1840 and 1900. The structure is built into the cliff face and incorporates typical features and materials such as limestone rubble and brickwork. Between 1928 and 1929, the lime kiln was skilfully converted to a bathing box in a modified Inter-war Spanish Mission or 'Pueblo' style by architect Harry Norris, as an adjunct to the building of Ilyuka, an expansive house, for American Oil Company executive Harry Cornforth.

Lime produced on the Mornington Peninsula was used in the building trade in Melbourne, especially for the grand Italianate houses, and was of sufficient quality to compete with imports. Patterns of settlement closely followed the location of kilns, for example at Portsea, Sorrento and Rye. The regular trade of lime schooners transporting lime to Melbourne enhanced communications to these relatively remote parts of Victoria.

The Ilyuka Lime Kiln was probably closed down in the period 1890 to 1904, when many kilns were closed on the Mornington Peninsula.

The house was sold by Cornforth in c. 1940s to the Matear family, who in turn sold the house in 1995 for A$5 million to David Deague who illegally demolished part of the property, attracting local protests and a record fine. In 1999, Michele O’Halloran purchased Ilyuka for $7.5 million, with an additional price paid for some of the house chattels, and sold off a 742-square-metre (7,990 sq ft) block for $1.6 million. O’Halloran listed the property for sale in 2010 with expectations of $20 million. In 2024, it was reported that John Higgins had purchased Ilyuka for $26 million in 2010, and set a record for the area.

== Description ==
The kiln structure is representative of the bottle kiln type of construction, the most common type of the surviving lime kilns in Victoria.

When modified in the late 1920s, the former kiln was converted into a limestone and timber bathing box with four spaces – an entry courtyard, dressing rooms on either side for males and females, and a lounge open to the courtyard. The courtyard has lost its pergola roof of open Stringybark poles. A description of the bathing box soon after its transformation reveals that the kiln is constructed hard against the cliff, with wing walls extending outwards towards the coast. Additional limestone was quarried on the spot to construct the two dressing rooms, paved forecourt and front wall. The rear wall, containing the kiln shaft, arch, and draw hole, forms one wall of the lounge, two walls are created by the wing walls of the kiln. The draw hole is set into a brick wall and arch, and the shaft is said to be of brick. The associated jetty was built at a higher level, intruding into the view of the bathing box from the beach. Otherwise the building appears remarkably intact.

== See also ==
- List of manufacturing plants in Melbourne
- List of places on the Victorian Heritage Register in the Shire of Mornington Peninsula
