= Jack Mulligan =

Australian rules footballer

Personal information
- Full name: John Patrick Mulligan
- Born: 18 June 1919; South Melbourne, Victoria
- Died: 5 July 2000 (aged 81); Rye, Victoria
- Height: 180 cm (5 ft 11 in)
- Weight: 78 kg (172 lb)

Playing career^{1}
Years	Club	Games (Goals)
1941	South Melbourne	8 (17)
- ^{1} Playing statistics correct to the end of 1941.

John Patrick Mulligan (18 June 1919 – 5 July 2000) was an Australian rules footballer who played with South Melbourne in the Victorian Football League (VFL).

Mulligan also served in both the Australian Army and Royal Australian Air Force in World War II.
