= Fort Franklin =

Fort Franklin may refer to:

== Australia ==
- Fort Franklin, Portsea, a former fort, now camp, in Portsea, on the Mornington Peninsula, Victoria

== Canada ==
- Délı̨nę, Northwest Territories, formerly known as Fort Franklin

== United States ==
- Fort Franklin (Schuylkill County, Pennsylvania), one of a defensive line of forts built during the French and Indian War
- Fort Franklin (New York), built as a British fortification in Huntington during the Revolutionary War
- Fort Franklin Battlespace Laboratory, Hanscom AFB, Massachusetts
- Franklin's Fort, fort in Kansas to garrison pro-slavery forces in Bleeding Kansas
- Franklin, Idaho, built on the site of Mormon Fort Franklin (1860–1863)
- Fort Franklin (Venango County, Pennsylvania), built on the site of the late-18th century French Fort Machault, which was rebuilt in the 1780s as Fort Franklin
- Fort Franklin, a temporary stockade built in the 1740s in Shippensburg, Pennsylvania. Replaced by Fort Morris (Pennsylvania) in 1755.
