= Wilhelmsgymnasium =

Wilhelmsgymnasium may refer to:

- Wilhelmsgymnasium (Königsberg)
- Wilhelmsgymnasium (Munich)
- Wilhelm-Gymnasium, Hamburg

== See also ==
- Friedrich Wilhelm Gymnasium, Berlin
- Wilhelm-Diess-Gymnasium, Pocking, Bavaria
- Wilhelm-Ernst-Gymnasium, Weimar
