= Anmatyerre (disambiguation) =

The Anmatyerre are an Aboriginal people of the Northern Territory of Australia

Anmatyerre (which may also be spelt Anmatjera, Anmatyerr, Anmatjirra, or Amatjere) may also refer to:

- Anmatjere, Northern Territory, a locality in Australia
- Anmatyerre language, the language of the Anmatyerre
- Anmatjere Community, or Anmatyerre Community, a former local government area in the Northern Territory of Australia
