= WDG =

WDG is an acronym that might stand for:

- Wandong railway station, Australia
- Wilhelm-Diess-Gymnasium, a senior high school in Pocking, Bavaria, Germany.
- World Disc Games, a semi regular sports event.
- Windows and Devices Group, a department from Microsoft; see Windows Insider
