= Dominican Roman Catholic Convent =

Dominican Roman Catholic Convent (former)
- Location within New South Wales Location within Australia
- 31°05′30″S 150°56′01″E
- Location: Marius Street (East), Tamworth, Tamworth Regional Council, New South Wales, Australia

History
- Built: 1880–1882
- Built for: Dominican Order

Site notes
- Architectural style: Victorian Free Gothic
- Owner: University of New England

New South Wales Heritage Register
- Official name: Dominican Roman Catholic Convent; St Nicolas' Church
- Type: State heritage (built)
- Designated: 2 April 1999
- Reference no.: 122
- Type: Convent/Nunnery
- Category: Religion

The Dominican Roman Catholic Convent is a heritage-listed former convent located on Marius Street (East) in Tamworth, New South Wales in the state's New England region. It is also known as St Nicolas' Church. It was added to the New South Wales State Heritage Register on 2 April 1999.

The building is owned by the University of New England and is leased by the Tamworth Regional Conservatorium of Music.

== History ==
The convent was established by the Dominican Order and built during 1880 and 1882. Built of exposed variegated brick laid in English Bond, of three stories and in the Victorian Free Gothic style. The roof was originally galvanised iron. The balconies feature cast iron columns between which are long bent timber brackets meeting to form in effect pointed arches which impart a strong ecclesiastical flavour to the building. In the open spandrel to each arch is an infill of a timber ring in four segments. The convent building was originally designed to accommodate nuns on the ground and first floor with a dormitory for boarders on the top floor. Extensions to the original building were made in 1903–04 and the Chapel opened as a memorial to celebrate the golden jubilee of the profession of Mother Mary Regis, who was the first Mother Superior.

Sister Mary Madeleine Thérèse was twice Mother Superior here during the 1920s.

The school grew and comprised the entire site now occupied by the K-Mart complex with the exception of a small parcel of land at the intersection of Peel and White Streets.

In the 1970s the convent was in a deteriorated condition after the closure of the school, the land was sold for the development of a Kmart complex, and the building was marked for demolition. A group of local citizens, recognising the historic significance and potential of the old convent, began strenuous efforts to have the building retained. The National Trust was alerted, and the building was classified, which authenticated the claim of its significance. While classification gave official recognition to the heritage value of the building, this alone could not have prevented its demolition. Representations were made to the Heritage Council of New South Wales and the Council placed a Conservation Order on the Convent, the Chapel, and the fence, describing the complex as “magnificent”. Ownership of the site was transferred to the Minister for Planning and Environment.

In July 1980, the Public Works Department prepared feasibility for possible uses of the building. The Heritage Council selected an option that would provide accommodation for the Tamworth Office of the Public Works Department, the Tamworth Regional Music Centre and the Tamworth Art & Craft Society. The Public Works Department then undertook the construction phase of the project. The restoration involved some skill not commonly used today. These included matching the elaborate timber mouldings, architraves and doors and the painting of stencilled designs on the walls. The external façade of the building was cleaned and all painted surfaces were repaired and painted using the original colours. The total cost of the restoration was $620,000, a modest amount compared with the cost of building such facilities from scratch. In 1993 the Public Works Department vacated the building and ownership of the building was transferred to the University of New England. The Tamworth Regional Conservatorium of Music leased the building for a peppercorn rent, with responsibility for the maintenance of the building.

In 2003–2004, the Conservatorium undertook major repair work on the stained glass windows in the Chapel. The windows were removed and transported to a workshop in the Kangaroo Valley where they were cleaned, broken glass replaced, re-leaded and rebuilt prior to being returned to Tamworth. In 2003 restoration and refurbishment of the Chapel roof was undertaken and part of the exterior of the building was repainted. In 2006 the exterior painting was completed. In 2007 a renovation of the Chapel was undertaken involving the relocation of the stage, upgrading of the lighting, painting, new chairs and the purchase of a new grand piano.

== Heritage listing ==
Dominican Roman Catholic Convent was listed on the New South Wales State Heritage Register on 2 April 1999.

== See also ==
- Australian non-residential architectural styles
