= Fort Franklin, Portsea =

Heritage-listed former fort, now camp, in Melbourne, Victoria, Australia

Fort Franklin
- Location of the former fort, now camp, in Greater Metropolitan Melbourne
- Alternative names: The Portsea Camp

General information
- Status: Completed
- Type: Fort (1885–1945); School camp site (since 1946– )
- Architectural style: Mid-Victorian
- Location: 3704 Point Nepean Road, Portsea, Mornington Peninsula, Melbourne, Victoria, Australia
- Coordinates: 38°19′05″S 144°43′06″E
- Completed: 1870; 156 years ago
- Owner: Colony of Victoria (1885–1901); Commonwealth of Australia (1901–1946); City of Melbourne (1946–1995); The Portsea Camp charity (since 1995)

Technical details
- Material: Limestone; reinforced concrete; timber; corrugated iron; glass
- Grounds: 3 ha (7.4 acres)

Website
- theportseacamp.com.au

Victorian Heritage Register
- Official name: Former Fort Franklin (Portsea Camp)
- Type: Registered place
- Designated: 27 July 1995
- Reference no.: H1090
- Heritage overlay no.: HO198
- Categories: Health Services; Military; Recreation and Entertainment

Register of the National Estate
- Official name: Fort Franklin (former)
- Type: Defunct register
- Designated: undated
- Reference no.: 103006

Fort Franklin is a former fortification, now school camp site, located at 3704 Point Nepean Road in Portsea, on the Mornington Peninsula, in the south eastern suburbs of Melbourne, in Victoria, Australia.

Built from 1870 on the traditional lands of the Bunurong people, the former fort was added to the Victorian Heritage Register on 27 July 1995 in recognition of its architectural, historical, scientific, and social significance; and, on unknown dates, was also added to the Victorian War Heritage Inventory and the now defunct Register of the National Estate, both non-statutory lists.

The school camp site has been in operation since 1946, initially run with the support of the City of Melbourne and, since 1995, as a registered not-for-profit organisation, known as The Portsea Camp.

== History ==
The Watson brothers, two of whom migrated to Australia from Scotland in 1856 and were soon followed by two more brothers, were pioneer settlers and fishermen in the Portsea area. John Watson occupied an area of land which now forms part of the Portsea Camp and built a six-room limestone house there, as well as a hut on the foreshore. The limestone house, now known as the Commandant's house, may date from the Watson period, that is, prior to 1885. In 1885, the Colony of Victoria compulsorily purchased his property, at a cost of £1,500. Henry Watson had a hut on the beach under Point Franklin.

Between 1885 and 1889, concrete fortifications were constructed by the contractors Morris and Beggs as part of the system of fortifications of Port Phillip Bay to protect Melbourne against invasion by Russian raiders. They formed part of Victoria's coastal defence network, preventing enemy ships from using the South Channel and gaining access to Melbourne. The network included South Channel Fort, Swan Island, and Point Nepean. It stretched to Queenscliff and Williamstown. This extensive coastal defence system for Port Phillip Bay reputedly made it the most heavily defended harbour in the Southern Hemisphere for the decades around the turn of the century. The fortifications at Fort Franklin represent part of an integrated coastal defence system dating from the late nineteenth century and demonstrate contemporary developments in military architecture and engineering, particularly to cater for the disappearing gun.

Following Federation, ownership of the site was transferred to the Commonwealth of Australia.

In addition to the fortifications, barracks were constructed to accommodate permanent and volunteer troops; and training sessions were held on site. A small hospital ward was built, probably at the time of the construction of the barracks, and it is believed that five soldiers who had returned from the Boer War died there in August 1902. The hospital building of that period is no longer extant and may have been replaced by the present medical centre.

Later military use during World War II necessitated the construction of underground bunkers and observation posts. The site was used as an ammunition dump by the United States Army during World War II. One of the bunkers is believed to be an underground munitions store. Another partly underground structure to the west of the site was an observation post. The forward searchlight emplacement on the cliff beyond the gun emplacement was also constructed for use during World War II. The camp was also used as a migrant camp for a short time in the immediate post-World War II period, before the then Department of the Interior leased it to the Melbourne City Council, initially on a temporary basis from 1946; and then on a permanent basis during the 1950s.

In 1951-52, the Australian Army proposed to make Fort Franklin an officer cadet school. After objections by the Children's Camp Committee, the Officer Cadet School, Portsea was established at the Quarantine Station site. The Committee subsequently acquired the freehold from the Australian Government. Since 1995, the camps have been run by a registered charity with financial support provided by the Melbourne City Council and the Victorian Government. A Committee was established to oversea governance that includes community representatives and councillors and was chaired by the Lord Mayor of Melbourne. The aim of The Portsea Camp is to enrich the lives of children from country areas by providing seaside holidays.

== Description ==
The Former Fort Franklin (Portsea Camp) consists of a series of gun emplacements, associated barracks and parade ground, commandant's house and timber staff cottage as well as underground bunkers and observation posts dating from c. 1940. The complex occupies approximately three hectares (seven acres) and includes early and mid-Victorian buildings as well as some constructed in the 1950s and 1960s.

The main fortification area comprises three gun emplacements and steps leading down to an observation point. They are constructed from concrete and have suffered some foundation movement which is not surprising given the close proximity of the natural shoreline. A ground well and oval are adjacent to this area. A small timber cottage with a corrugated iron roof is in close proximity to the fortifications. It has some original detailing to the windows and the verandah.

In 1887, the armament at the fort consisted of three 36-kilogram (80 lb) muzzle-loading guns, but it was by then decided to substitute three breech loading guns on the disappearing principle. In 1892, Fort Franklin contained two 13-centimetre (5 in) 2.7-tonne (3-short-ton) guns, one 25-centimetre (10 in) 23-tonne (25-short-ton) gun, one 12.00-centimetre (4.724 in) quick–firing gun for sea defence and one five–barrel Nordenfeldt field gun in case of land attack. Most of the forts had searchlights, observation points, and gun emplacements. They co-ordinated aspects such as firing range, viewing areas and Morse code communications. The task of Fort Franklin was to guard the South Channel, preventing enemy shipping using the South Channel and to provide a site for examination anchorage, where suspicious ships were ordered to drop anchor and be searched while under the surveillance of gunners. Those ships that made any declarations were sent to Point Nepean and the Quarantine Station.

The gun emplacements at Fort Franklin have been altered, for example the tunnels of the gun emplacement have been bricked up for safety reasons. Some of the joinery around the storage recesses and other details remain. Some evidence of original signage remains. The form of the three gun emplacements is intact and the mounds demonstrate the way the guns were mounted. The barracks building was probably constructed c. 1885 – c. 1889. The barracks, house and staff cottage have lost some detailing and require refurbishment, but the essential form of the buildings and much of the internal arrangement and fabric survives. The staff cottage was on its present site by 1887.

Another part of the installation includes a dug-out. This is a flat roofed concrete structure on the edge of the cliff. It retains heavy metal covers for openings which have now been converted to windows. Nearby is a flat roofed concrete structure believed to be a former ammunitions store.

The barracks buildings are particularly evocative of military order. They consist of a quadrangle with central parade grounds flanked by accommodation. The barracks are of limestone construction with gabled roofs of corrugated iron. The skillion verandahs have timber posts and asphalt floors. The building interiors match the exteriors in their austerity and simplicity. There are timber floors and timber boards. The windows are double-hung, each divided into six panes. An additional barracks is sited towards the Bay. It is a simple building with a corrugated iron roof. Horizontal, broad gauge, corrugated iron covers the walls and the windows are double-hung, divided into four panes. The verandah has timber posts and rails.

The Commander's residence stands alone and is the only building in the complex which displays decoration. It is L-shaped, with a projecting bay to the front room and a verandah. The construction material is rock faced limestone, coursed and tuckpointed. Flat arches with soldier courses are above openings. The verandah has a slate edging to the tiles and cast iron lacework within a timber frame to timber posts. The chimneys are rendered and corbelled and a large finial remains to the front gable.

Buildings associated with the later use of the site by the Lord Mayor's Children's Camp from 1946–1947 to 1995 are also on the site. The fort was operated by the Victorian colonial government until Federation when it was taken over by the Commonwealth. From 1946, the site was leased from the army and then the Department of the Interior before being purchased by the Lord Mayor?s Children's Camp Fund in 1964.The children's camp is now known as the Portsea Camp.

The buildings which date from the Lord Mayor's Children's Camp include dormitories, staff quarters, and medical centre. In the 1970s the medical centre was a seven-bed hospital staffed by The Alfred Hospital. The original idea for the camp was to provide seaside holidays to underprivileged children from remote areas. The first groups of children came from the Mallee. Health checks and medical and dental treatment for the children were for many years an integral part of the camp, but this became less necessary in the 1960s when better health care became available. The barrack building in particular demonstrates changing patterns of occupancy from use by the army to use by the Lord Mayor's Children's Camp.

There has been a long association between the community and the children's camp occupation of the site, in particular, involvement by medical and allied professionals, members of the fire, police and surf lifesaving services and other volunteers, who have been involved in the camp since the 1940s. The community holds strong shared memories of experiences and social life, which have created a strong connection to the place.

== See also ==
- Architecture of Melbourne
- List of places on the Victorian Heritage Register in the Shire of Mornington Peninsula
