= Portsea Polo =

Polo event

Portsea Polo is an annual polo event held in Portsea, Victoria. The event was founded in 2002 by David Calvert-Jones, grandson of philanthropist Dame Elisabeth Murdoch. It is held on a Saturday in mid-January at Jarman Oval, near the former Quarantine Station located on Point Nepean.

== History ==
Started as a charity event to raise money for the Murdoch Children's Research Institute, the event only attracted a few hundred spectators in its first year. Across the following few years the event began to grow, drawing in 5000 spectators in its fifth year and selling out for the first time. It has consistently drawn crowds of up to 6000 spectators since, and now raises over $100,000 for the charity annually.

The event, which costs over $1 million to run, is funded through sponsorship from large brands, and has variously had naming partnerships with The Age, Stella Artois, Jeep, Teka, Elica and Alfa Romeo. It regularly attracts many well known names from some of Melbourne's most affluent families.

The 2008 event was cancelled by the Point Nepean Community Trust due to concerns surrounding an outbreak of equine influenza.
