= Kathleen Mary Egan =

Australian Dominican Sister and educationist

- Born: 16 December 1890; The Rock
- Died: 17 June 1977 (aged 86); Newcastle

Kathleen Mary Egan religious name Mary Madeleine Thérèse (1890–1977) was an Australian Dominican Mother Superior and educationist.

== Life ==
Egan was born in 1890 in The Rock near Wagga Wagga. She was educated by the Dominican nuns at Maitland and by 1912 she took her vows and the name Mary Madeleine Thérèse.

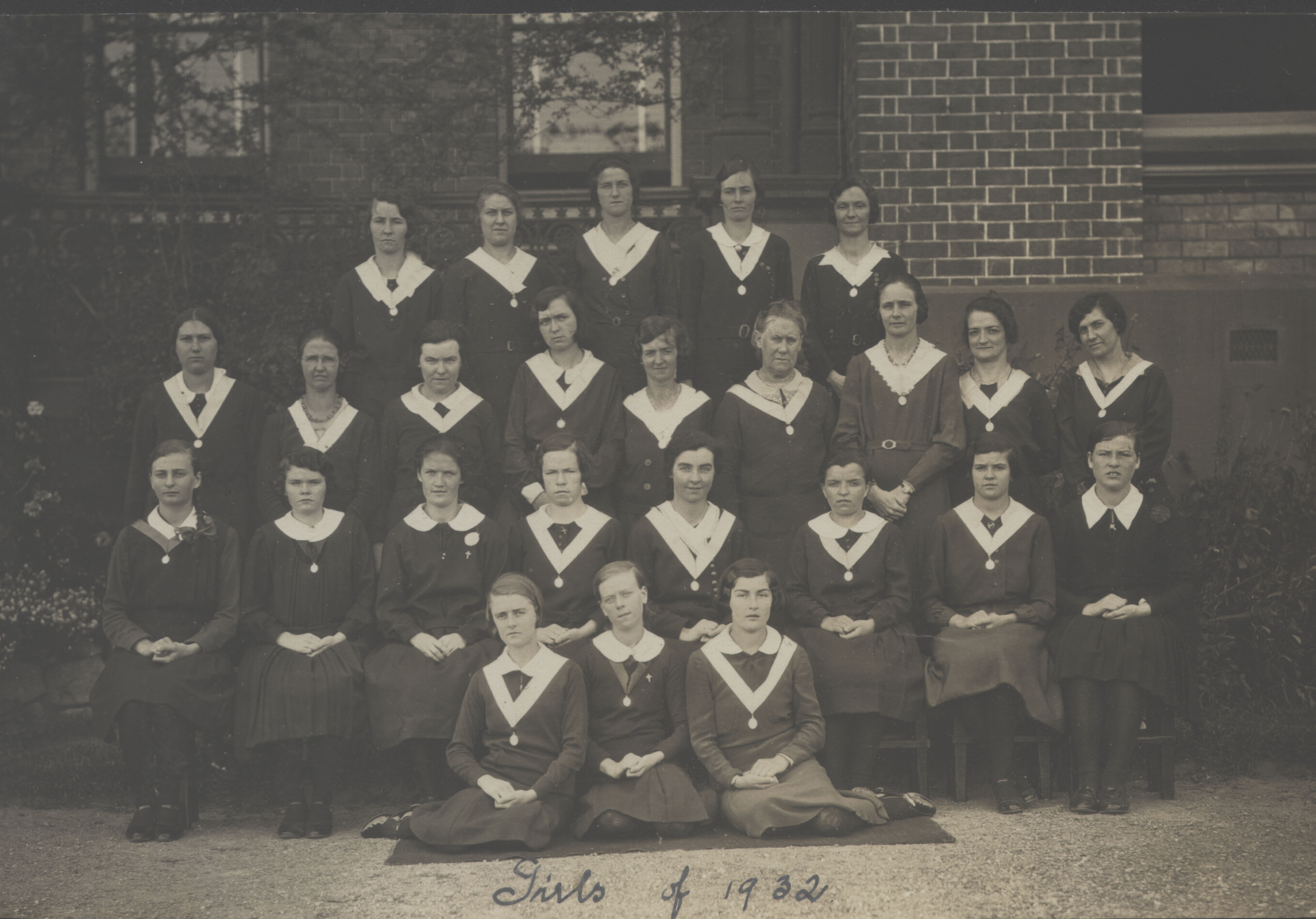
Waratah Deaf and Dumb Institute's girls in 1932

By 1924 she was a Mother Superior at the Dominican Roman Catholic Convent in Tamworth and in 1926 in Mayfield. In 1929 she returned to Tamworth and in 1931 she was asked to lead the Institution for the Deaf and Dumb at Waratah which was run by the Dominican Sisters of Eastern Australia. She had previously taught maths and now as Mother Superior she was able to improve the teaching at the Institution. She decided to use textbooks from the National Curriculum and she made no assumptions about her charges based on their lack of hearing. The children were involved in helping at what they renamed the School for Deaf Girls.

In 1938 she decided that the school should improve its use of sound amplifiers, speech and lip-reading to mitigate their charges lack of hearing. She invited an expert from Canada, Father L Page, to explain the latest ideas to the school's staff. These techniques were known as "oral" and there was some debate about their advantages over sign language. She left the school in 1941.

In January 1948 the new St Mary's School for Deaf Children was opened on the coast at Portsea 60 km from Melbourne. It was an initiative by the Dominican Sisters of Eastern Australia and Egan was appointed as its Mother Superior. She went to New Zealand to observe schools for the deaf there that only used oral techniques. She decided to adopt that approach at St Mary's. It was said to be the first oral school in Victoria and they were teaching 50 students. Egan left the school after nine years, during her time the high standard of the children's speech impressed government inspectors.

Egan retired to the Rosary Convent, Waratah and died in 1977.
