= Tiptree (disambiguation) =

Tiptree is a village and civil parish in Essex, England.

Tiptree may also refer to:

- Tiptree United F.C., a former football club based in Tiptree
- Tiptree railway station, a former railway station in Tiptree
- James Tiptree Jr., pen name of American science fiction and fantasy author Alice Bradley Sheldon (1915–1987)
  - James Tiptree, Jr. Award, annual science fiction award now known as the Otherwise Award
- Tiptree fruit preserves, the primary brand of Wilkin & Sons of Tiptree, Essex
