= Wilhelm-Diess-Gymnasium Pocking =

Senior high school in Pocking, Bavaria, Germany

Coordinates: 48.4013°N 13.3245°E

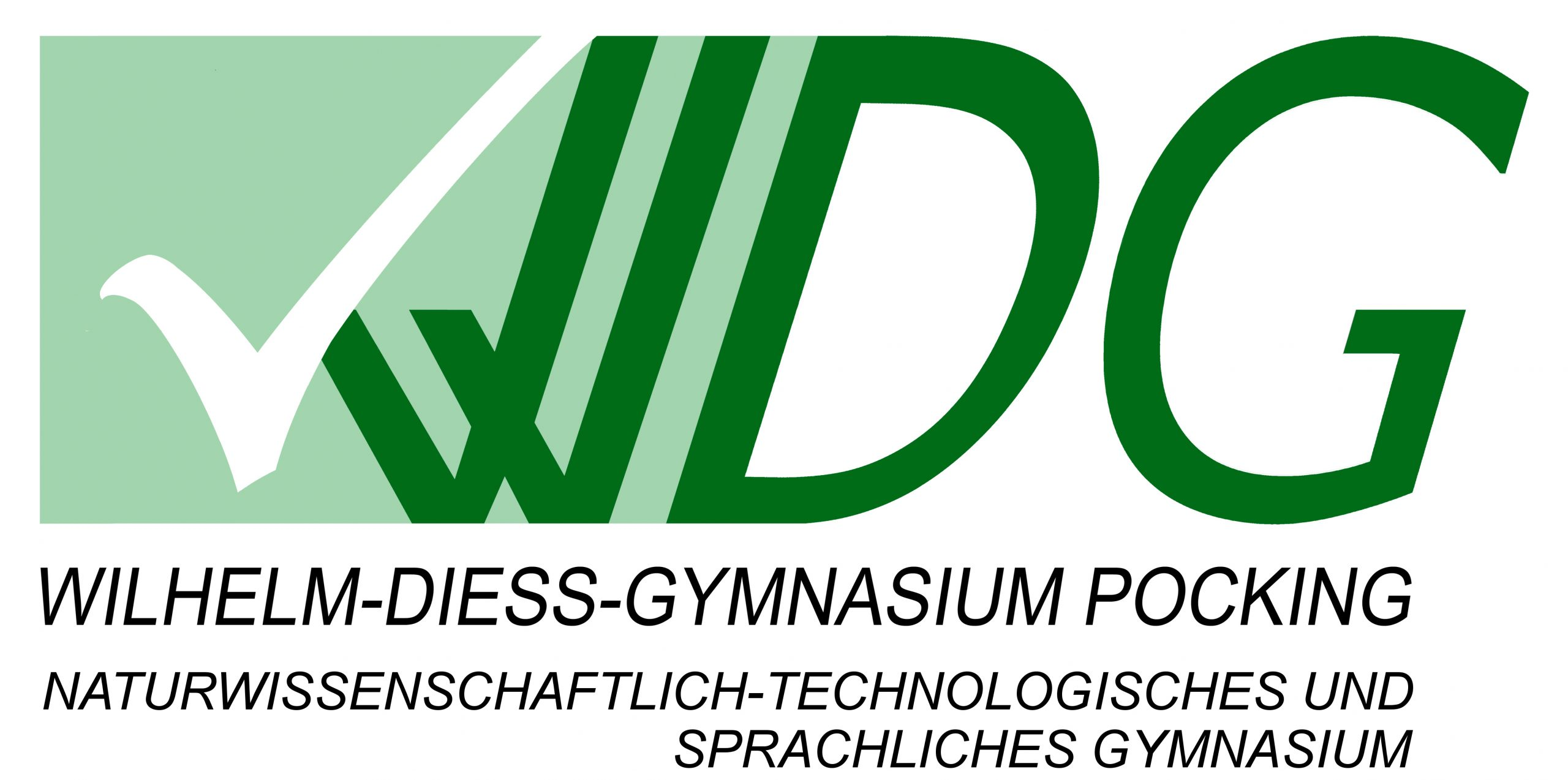

Location
- Dr.-Karl-Weiß-Platz 2; 94060 Pocking

Information
- Type: Gymnasium
- Established: 1948
- Authority: Landkreis Passau
- School number: 0259
- Head teacher: Stefan Stadler
- Staff: 60 (school year 2023/24)
- Enrollment: 773 (school year 2023/24)
- Website: wdg-pocking.de

Wilhelm-Diess-Gymnasium Pocking (short form of the official designation WDG Pocking; unofficially also referred to as simply Wilhelm-Diess-Gymnasium; frequently abbreviated colloquially as WDG) is a German state-recognized Gymnasium, which as educational branches offers the natural science and technological and modern-language training variants. Located in Lower Bavarian Pocking, which lies in the southern part of the district of Passau, the educational institution was founded in summer 1948 by Wilhelm Pliquett and Friedl Poppe originally as a private Oberrealschule (higher secondary school) and has borne the name of the storyteller, poet, jurist and theater director Wilhelm Diess from the region since 1986.

== History ==
The current Wilhelm-Diess-Gymnasium Pocking was founded in summer 1948 by Wilhelm Pliquett and Friedl Poppe initially as a private Oberrealschule. As at the time of founding its own classrooms were lacking, the then Landkreis Griesbach im Rottal erected a temporary building in which during the 1949/50 school year a total of 179 students were taught. In 1957 came the state recognition and in 1958 the nationalization of the educational institution. In 1960 the new school building constructed by the Zweckverband Oberrealschule Pocking in Indlinger Straße in Pocking was occupied. From 1965 to 1967 an extension building was erected and with the introduction of the Kollegstufe (collegiate level) in 1971 an extension building was constructed, which was intended to meet the new spatial requirements of the gymnasiale Oberstufe (upper secondary level). Since 1986 the school has borne the name Wilhelm-Diess-Gymnasium Pocking, named after the storyteller, poet, jurist and theater director Wilhelm Diess who came from the region. On 7 August 1995 the groundbreaking for the new building at Dr.-Karl-Weiß-Platz 2 took place and since 1997 instruction has occurred in the new premises.

== Educational Programs ==
In the fifth grade all pupils learn English as their first foreign language. As second foreign language, which begins in the sixth grade, either Latin or French can be chosen. From the eleventh grade onward the second foreign language can be replaced by the newly commencing foreign language Spanish, whereby in this enrollment form the choice of changing the foreign language must already be made in the tenth grade. When selecting the foreign language Spanish it is mandatory to continue this subject until the 13th grade.

In the language-oriented educational track, as third foreign language French is taught beginning in the eighth grade. In the natural-scientific-technological branch physics, chemistry and computer science form the focus of subject-specific education.

Since 2021 the school also offers an introductory class. This leads pupils with a middle school diploma in three school years to the general university entrance qualification. In this case the selection of Spanish as late-starting foreign language is obligatory, since the corresponding pupils until then at the middle or secondary school have only learned English as foreign language.

== Extracurricular Activities ==
Distributed across nearly all grade levels, school trips for educational purposes are offered. Beginning with the initial journey to a school camp in the fifth class, through which the getting-to-know process is to be specifically promoted, the school-familial relationships among the grammar school pupils are subsequently intensified through the visit to a ski course. In the following grade levels voluntary trips are made available respectively within the framework of a student exchange. From the tenth grade onward primarily the scientific claim of the grammar school track is consolidated, which is also made clear through the increasing focus on the historical events regarding the trips. Thus the primary learning objective of the Saxony trip taking place in the tenth class lies in the recognition of the progress through the German reunification, whereby for example the Stasi Bautzen Memorial is visited. In grade eleven through the Science Week, which concerns itself for example with climate change and the resulting measures that must be taken in this regard, the cooperation with experts from various specialist fields is promoted, in particular the communication of the results stands at the center during the subsequent presentation.

== Additional Offerings ==
At Wilhelm-Diess-Gymnasium Pocking annual competitions such as the Känguru der Mathematik in mathematics take place. Likewise, in consideration of the fact that it is a natural-scientific-technological educational institution, further competitions from the subject area of the STEM fields are organized, in particular the annually occurring student competition Informatik-Biber (Informatics Beaver) is here of great relevance.

The Gymnasium offers a school observatory, on which in the form of teaching modules of the subject astrophysics, some further seminars and elective courses astronomical knowledge is imparted. It is also possible for persons not in direct connection to the school to observe the events in the sky on the observatory. This occurs in the form of public observation evenings that take place for example on Astronomy Day.

Since 9 February 2012 takes place regularly the career fair horizont [sic] at Wilhelm-Diess-Gymnasium Pocking, at which diverse enterprises and state organizations of the district of Passau show the grammar school pupils potential career possibilities.

== Literature ==
- Festschrift des Gymnasiums Pocking zur Namensverleihung, Pocking, 1986.
- Festschrift zum 50-jährigen Jubiläum, Pocking, 1998.
