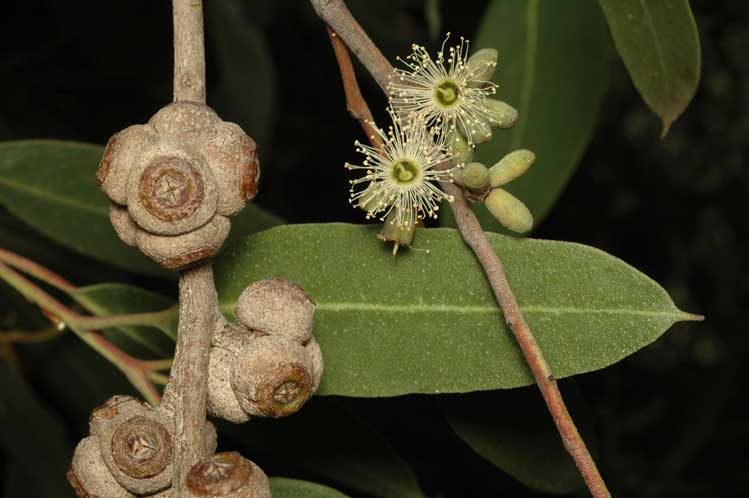
- Eucalyptus bensonii in the ANBG

Conservation status
- Vulnerable (IUCN 3.1)

Scientific classification
- Kingdom: Plantae
- Clade: Tracheophytes
- Clade: Angiosperms
- Clade: Eudicots
- Clade: Rosids
- Order: Myrtales
- Family: Myrtaceae
- Genus: Eucalyptus
- Species: E. bensonii

Binomial name
- Eucalyptus bensonii L.A.S.Johnson & K.D.Hill

= Eucalyptus bensonii =

Benson's stringybark

Species of eucalyptus

Eucalyptus bensonii, commonly known as Benson's stringybark, is a small tree or mallee that is endemic to New South Wales. It has rough grey or brown stringy bark on the trunk and larger branches, smooth bark on the thinnest branches, broadly lance-shaped to egg-shaped adult leaves, flower buds arranged in groups of seven, nine or eleven, white flowers and cup-shaped or hemispherical fruit in clusters.

== Description ==
Eucalyptus bensonii is a mallee or a small tree that typically grows to a height of 8 metres (26 ft) and forms a lignotuber. It has rough, grey or brown stringy bark on part or all of the trunak and larger branches, smooth grey bark above. Leaves on young plants and on coppice regrowth are broadly egg-shaped, 40–70 mm (2–3 in) long, 30–40 mm (1–2 in) wide on a petiole 5–7 mm (0.2–0.3 in) long. The adult leaves are arranged alternately, broadly lance-shaped or curved, 60–120 mm (2–5 in) long, 19–37 mm (0.7–1 in) wide with a petiole 10–20 mm (0.4–0.8 in) long, and the same glossy green on both sides. The flowers are borne in groups of seven or nine, rarely eleven, in leaf axils on an angled or flattened peduncle 4–12 mm (0.2–0.5 in) long, the individual flowers lacking a pedicel. Mature buds are oblong, 5–10 mm (0.2–0.4 in) long and 3–4 mm (0.1–0.2 in) wide with a conical to rounded operculum. Flowering occurs from November to January and the flowers are white. The fruit that follows are woody, hemispherical to shortened spheres 5 to 7 mm (0.20 to 0.28 in) long and 8 to 12 mm (0.31 to 0.47 in) wide in clusters.

== Taxonomy and naming ==
Eucalyptus bensonii was first formally described in 1990 by Lawrie Johnson and Ken Hill near Mount Boonbourwa which is near Kandos. The description was published in the journal Telopea. The specific epithet (bensonii) honours Douglas Howard Benson, an ecologist with the National Herbarium of New South Wales.

== Distribution and habitat ==
Benson's stringybark is only known from isolated occurrences in the Wollemi National Park between Rylstone and Glen Davis where it grows in heath on highland plateau areas.
