= Rye, Victoria =

Rye
- Suburb
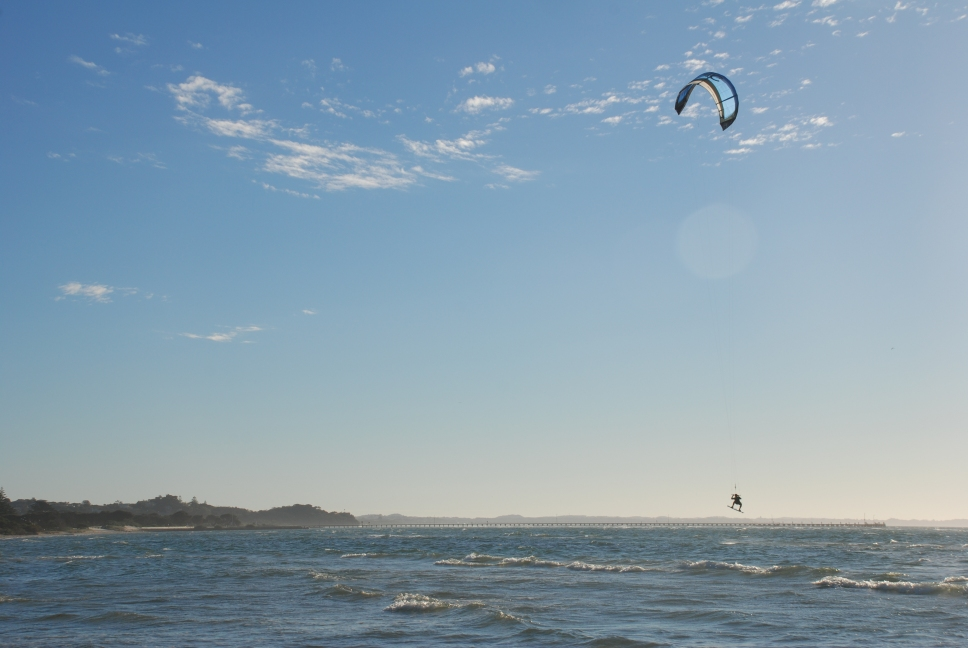
- Kitesurfing at Rye, Rye pier in background

- Interactive map of Rye
- Coordinates: 38.377°S 144.838°E
- Country: Australia
- State: Victoria
- LGA: Shire of Mornington Peninsula
- Location: 94.5 km (58.7 mi) from Melbourne; 10 km (6.2 mi) from Rosebud

Government
  - State electorate: Nepean
  - Federal division: Flinders

Area
  - Total: 14.7 km^{2} (5.7 sq mi)

Population
  - Total: 9,438 (2021 census)
  - Density: 642.0/km^{2} (1,663/sq mi)
- Postcode: 3941
Suburbs around Rye
	Port Phillip
Blairgowrie	Rye	Tootgarook
Bass Strait

Rye is a seaside suburb on the Mornington Peninsula in, Victoria, Australia, approximately 94.5 km (58.7 mi) south of Melbourne's Central Business District, located within the Shire of Mornington Peninsula local government area. Rye recorded a population of 9,438 at the 2021 census.

Rye's beach, on the eastern side of Port Phillip, is popular with swimmers, fishermen, yachtsmen, and kitesurfers. Its ocean beach (which is not patrolled) is also popular with surfers and divers. Rye is in the traditional country of the Boon wurrung (Bunurong) people of the Kulin nation.

== History ==
Rye was proclaimed a town on 26 February 1861 and is partly in the parish of Wannaeue but mainly in the parish of Nepean, which is west of Government Road and Weeroona Street. The township went south to the southern boundary of the cemetery, with its east and west boundaries being Weir Street and Dundas Street. Suburban lots of 8 to 40 hectares (21 to 98 acres) extended west to French Street and south to a point just past the Golf Parade corner. Most of these suburban lots were bought by W. A. Blair, a lime merchant from Melbourne.

Blair also received grants for much land in the parishes of Wannaeue and Nepean. His objective was to establish a monopoly, which was only rivalled by John Cain. Many who had been engaged in the production of lime, such as Nathan Page, Tom Bennett, Edward Russell, Harold Bainbridge and Spunner, were dispossessed of their kilns by Blair in about 1867. Lime could be quarried throughout the area west of Boneo Road. Many contemporary golf courses and the Peninsula Hot Springs are on the sites of lime burners' properties between Browns and Limestone Roads. A reproduction of a lime kiln is displayed on the foreshore just east of White Cliff. They were built into the side of a hill so that firewood and napped limestone could be loaded from above.

The demand for rye lime declined in 1879 with the opening of the Lilydale quarry. However, the Sullivan's Lime Kiln continued production south of Weeroona Road, with operations later managed by Antonio Albress, until c. 1917. Blair's large kiln remained active at the fire station site. Ben Stenniken and James Sullivan became the leaders in a new industry, firewood. Tea tree had spread inland from the foreshore as the she-oaks had almost completely disappeared, having fired the kilns for decades. Cut into 0.76-metre (2 ft 6 in) sections, the tea tree was shipped in former limecraft to heat bakers' ovens in Melbourne.

Jim Brown and the Jennings family moved into farms near Browns Road just before and after 1910, the latter on former Blair land. Brown set about dealing with rampant tea tree and rabbits, while the Jennings family moved into dairy farming. Another feature on land granted to Blair was the McDonalds' Rye Golf Links, enclosed by Dundas Street and Golf Parade.

The post office opened on 18 January 1858 as Tootgarook and was renamed Rye in 1870.

=== Heritage listings ===
The following places in Rye are listed on the Victorian Heritage Register:

- Grimwade House, 28–54 Dundas Street
- Sullivan's Lime Kiln, 335 Browns Road (The Dunes Golf Links)

== Attractions ==
The Rye Historical Society was founded in 2000 and operates from the Old School House on Collingwood Street. In 2010 the Rotary Club merged with the Rosebud Rotary Club. These organisations support the local community.

The town has an Australian rules football team that competes in the Mornington Peninsula Nepean Football League. Golf courses are located at the Moonah Links on Peter Thomson Drive or at The Dunes Golf Links on Browns Road.

The Rye Skatepark, opened in 2004, was the first cradle skate bowl built in the Southern Hemisphere; and is popular with skateboarders. Rye's summer carnival is located beside the pier carpark. The town is popular during vacation periods and has a varied selection of eating establishments. In 2026, a local campaign was started to designate part of the suburb along the Tyrone Foreshore area north of Melbourne Road and west of White Cliffs as the locality of Tyrone Beach.

=== Rye pier ===
The Rye pier is a popular recreational scuba diving shore dive site inside Port Phillip. The pier can house seahorses, stingrays, spider crabs, squid, scallops and octopuses and Australian fur seals. The wreck of the wooden sailing ketch Eivion lies 115 metres (377 ft) to the east; and the shipwreck remains of the wooden schooner Barbara lies 240 metres (790 ft) to the west of Rye pier. The Rye pier is also the location of an annual giant spider crab mass aggregation when, in late May–June, the crabs migrate along through the area.

=== Fire brigade ===
The Rye fire brigade is located in Collingwood Street, just behind the bowling club. The brigade has three appliances, a pumper, used for structure fires, a tanker, used for grass and scrub fires, and a salvage, used as a support for both pumper and tanker. The fire brigade is volunteer-based and responds to calls in the Rye area and surrounding areas. The Rye fire brigade played important roles during Black Saturday sending trucks to Narre Warren, Kinglake, Longwarry, and sending crews to Wilson Promontory.

== Gallery ==
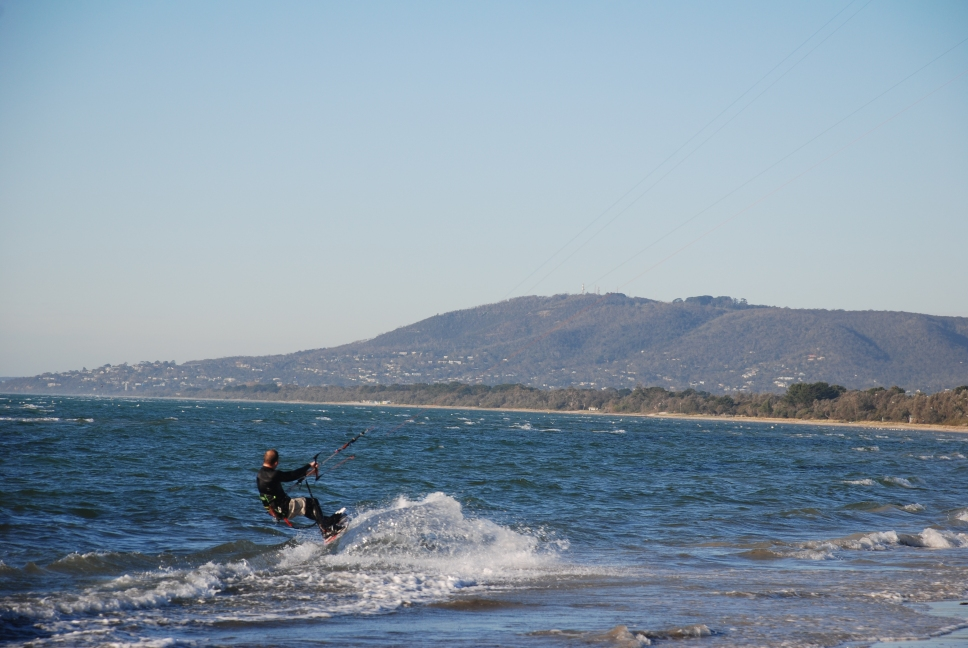
Kitesurfing at Rye. Arthurs Seat is in the background

== See also ==
- Shire of Flinders – Rye was previously within this former local government area.
