= Ti-Tree Airfield =

Airport in Australia

- IATA: YTIT; ICAO: none

Summary
- Airport type: public
- Owner: Northern Territory Government
- Operator: Central Desert Region
- Serves: Ti-Tree, Northern Territory
- Location: Ti-Tree, Northern Territory
- Time zone: ACST (+9:30)
  - Summer (DST): ACST (+9:30)
- Elevation AMSL: 1,600 ft / 488 m
- Coordinates: 22°07′38″S 133°25′21″E

Map
- Location in the Northern Territory

Runways
| Direction | Length | | Surface |
| Direction | ft | m | Surface |
|---|---|---|---|
| 1 | 4,265 | 1,300 | sealed |
- Runway

Ti-Tree Airfield (ICAO:YTIT), also known as Ti Tree aeroplane landing area (ALA) is a landing strip in the Northern Territory of Australia located in the town of Ti-Tree.

== Description ==
The airfield is located on the east side of the town and the Stuart Highway. Its single runway has a length of 4,265 feet (1,300 m), a width of 92 feet (28 m), a sealed surface and an approximate north-south orientation. The airfield is owned by the Northern Territory Government and operated by the local government authority, the Central Desert Region.

== Future developments ==
In 2015, the draft EIS for a proposed mine at Mount Peake which is located about 70 kilometres (43 mi) north-west of Ti-Tree included a proposal to upgrade the airfield to allow its use by aircraft such as the Fokker F100 or BAE146 to fly-in fly-out personnel involved in the mine's establishment and its subsequent operation. The proposed work included the increasing the width of the runway and the provision of a terminal building.

== Accidents and incidents ==
- On 6 July 2012, a Gippsland Aeronautics GA-8 Airvan aircraft on a night training flight from Tennant Creek to Alice Springs experienced an engine failure and carried out an emergency landing on the Stuart Highway about 4 kilometres (2.5 mi) of Ti-Tree after its crew were unable to activate the airfield's runway PAL system.

== See also ==
- List of airports in the Northern Territory
