= Anmatjere Community =

Anmatjere Community Northern Territory
- Coordinates: 22°8′10.65″S 133°25′8.97″E
- Population: 1,159 (2006)
  - Density: 0.31920/km^{2} (0.8267/sq mi)
- Established: 1993
- Abolished: 2008
- Postcode(s): 0872
- Area: 3,631 km^{2} (1,401.9 sq mi)
- Mayor: Tony Scrutton
- Council seat: Ti-Tree, Northern Territory
- Region: Alice Springs Region
- Federal division(s): Lingiari
- Website: Anmatjere Community

The Anmatjere Community, or Anmatyere Council, was a former local government area in the Northern Territory of Australia whose seat was located in the town of Ti-Tree, Northern Territory, located approximately 200 kilometres (120 mi) north of Alice Springs. The Stuart Highway runs through the centre of Ti Tree.

On 1 July 2008, the area covered by the Anmatyere council was merged into the Central Desert Shire, and the Council ceased to exist.

== Facilities ==
- Anmatjere Knowledge Centre and Library
- Redsand Art Gallery - which includes an Aboriginal Art centre and a cafe
- Ti Tree Roadhouse - which includes a bar, motel, camping and backpacker accommodation
- Ti Tree School
- Police Station
- Sports oval
- Health Clinic
- Aged Care Centre

== Areas of governance ==
- Alyuen (on Aileron Station)
- Anyungunba (on Pine Hill Station)
- Engawala (on Alcoota Station)
- Laramba (on Napperby Station)
- Nturiya (the western part of Ti-Tree Station)
- Pmara Jutunta (the central part of Ti-Tree Station)
- Ti-Tree (the Town of Ti-Tree)
- Wilora (on Stirling Station)
- Woolla (Adelaide Bore and the eastern part of Ti-Tree Station)
- Yanginj (on Anningie Station)

== See also ==
- Anmatjere, Northern Territory
