= Portsea, Victoria =

Portsea
- Suburb
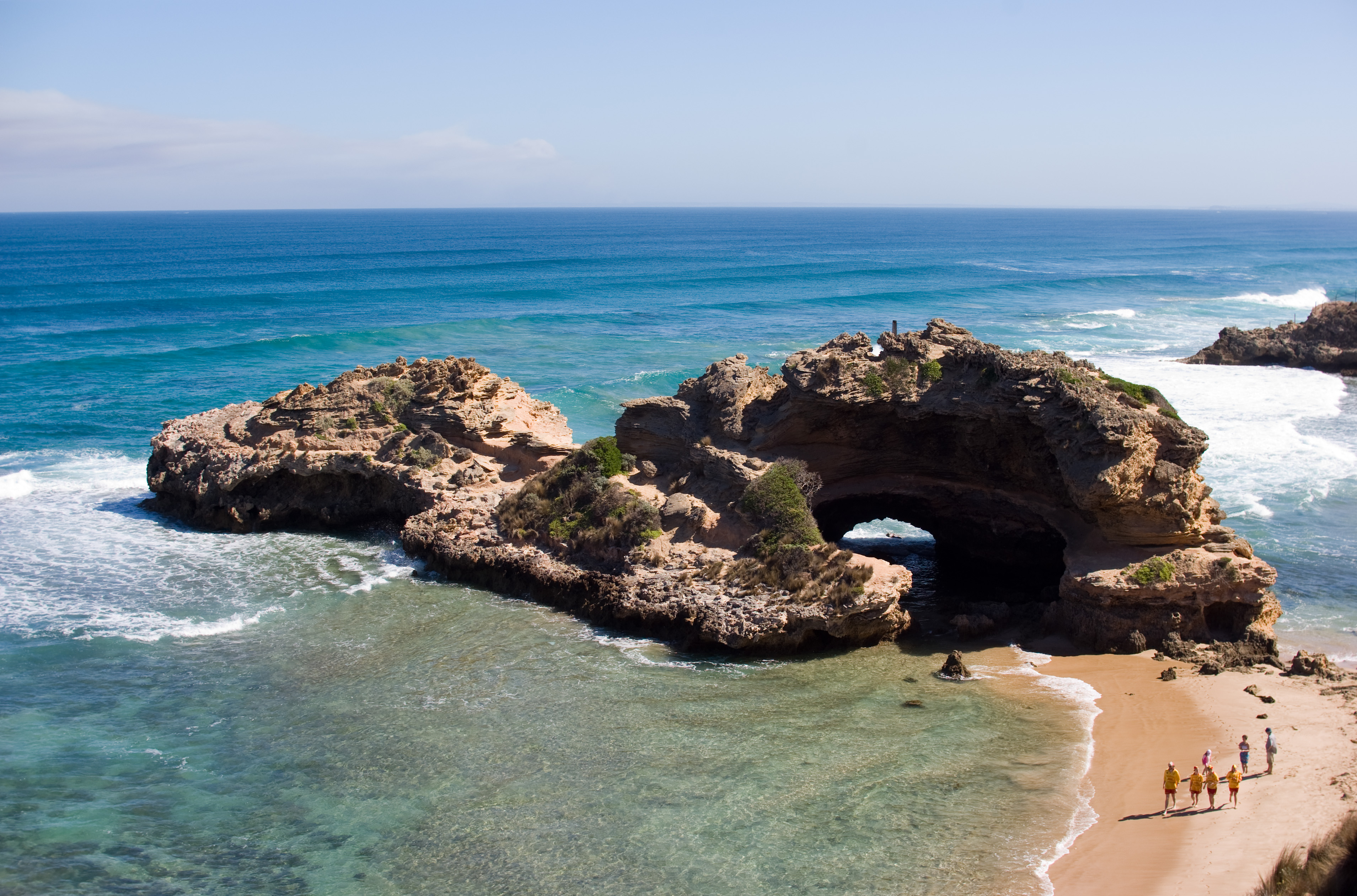
- London Bridge Lookout Portsea

- Interactive map of Portsea
- Coordinates: 38°19′14″S 144°43′02″E
- Country: Australia
- State: Victoria
- City: Melbourne
- LGA: Shire of Mornington Peninsula
- Location: 110 km (68 mi) from Melbourne CBD
- Established: 1850s

Government
  - State electorate: Nepean
  - Federal division: Flinders

Area
  - Total: 4 km^{2} (1.5 sq mi)

Population
  - Total: 787 (2021 census)
  - Density: 197/km^{2} (510/sq mi)
- Postcode: 3944
Suburbs around Portsea
Point Nepean		Port Phillip
	Portsea
Bass Strait		Sorrento

Portsea is a seaside suburb on the Mornington Peninsula in Melbourne, Victoria, Australia, approximately 110 kilometres (68 mi) south-west of Melbourne's city centre, located within the Shire of Mornington Peninsula local government area. Portsea recorded a population of 787 at the 2021 census.

As Australia's richest postcode, Portsea has the highest average income in the country. It is regarded as one of Australia's most prestigious seaside suburbs, with many of Melbourne's wealthiest residents maintaining holiday homes there.

Portsea is located on the opposite side of Port Phillip Bay. The suburb is located on the bay itself, but the locality boundaries stretch as far west as Point Nepean and incorporate a section of Bass Strait coastline. Portsea is the westernmost town on the Mornington Peninsula, and lies adjacent to Sorrento.

== History ==
=== Traditional ownership ===
The formally recognised traditional owners for the area in which Portsea is located are the Bunurong people. The Bunurong people are represented by the Bunurong Land Council Aboriginal Corporation.

=== European settlement ===
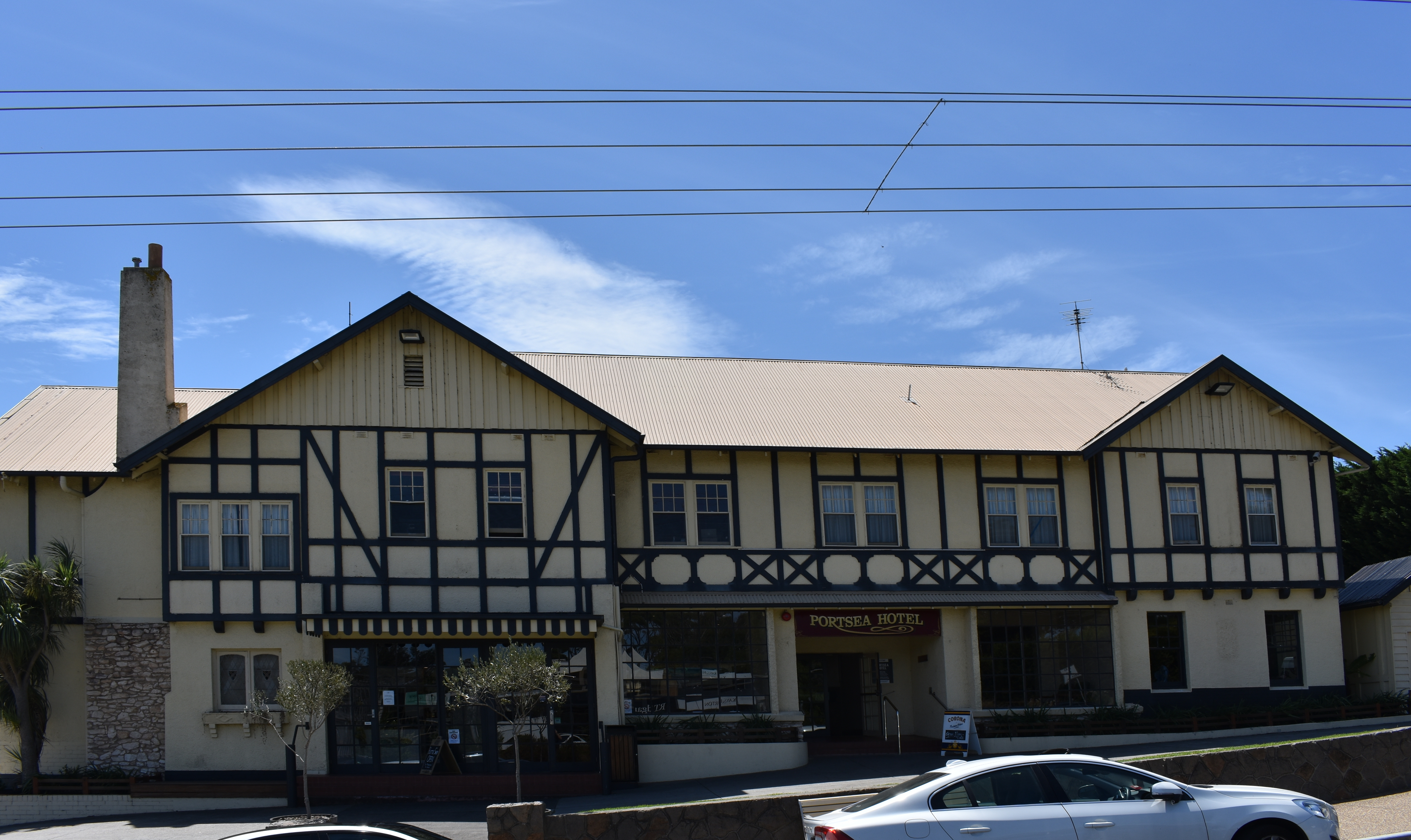
Portsea Hotel

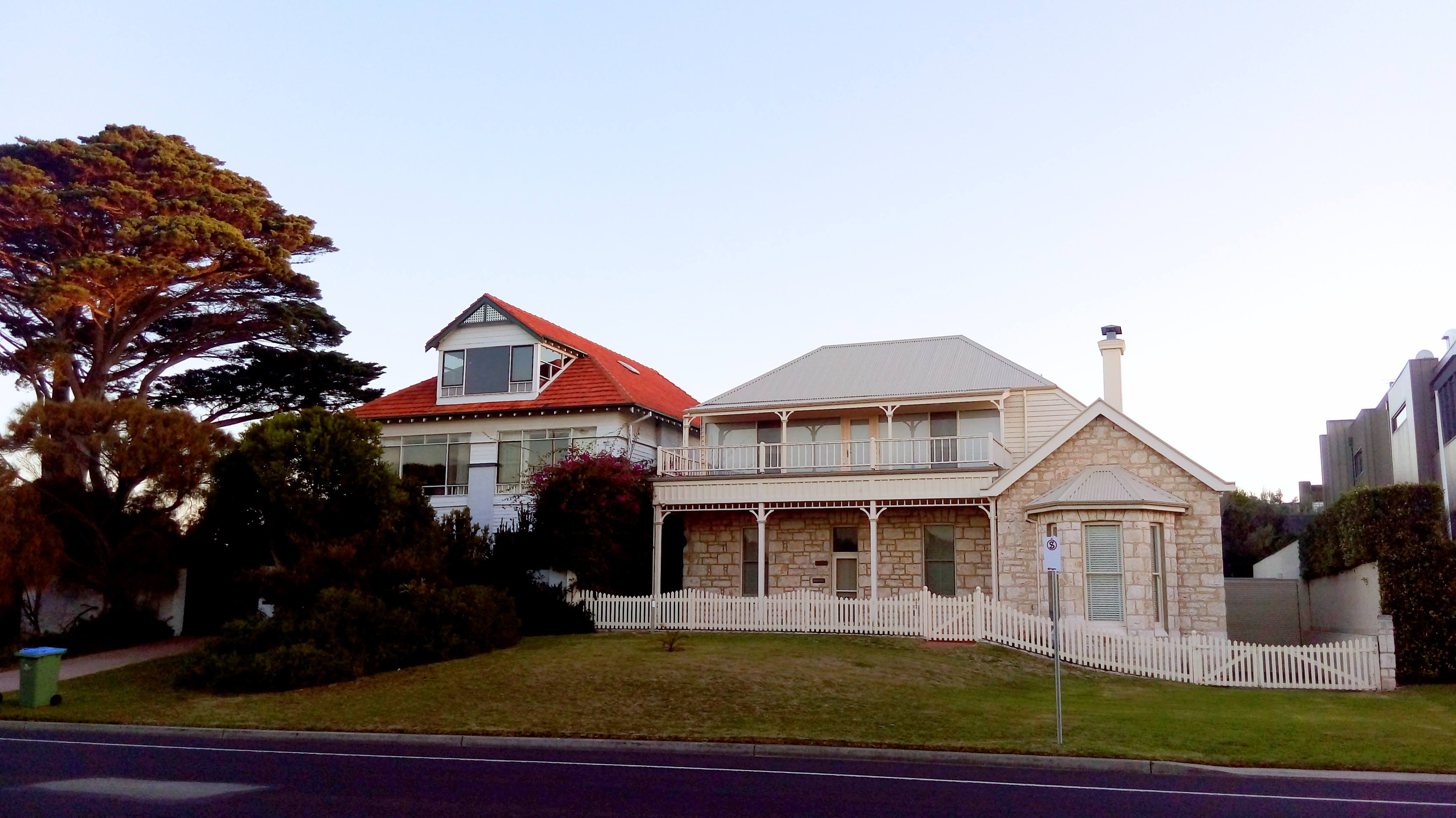
Portsea houses

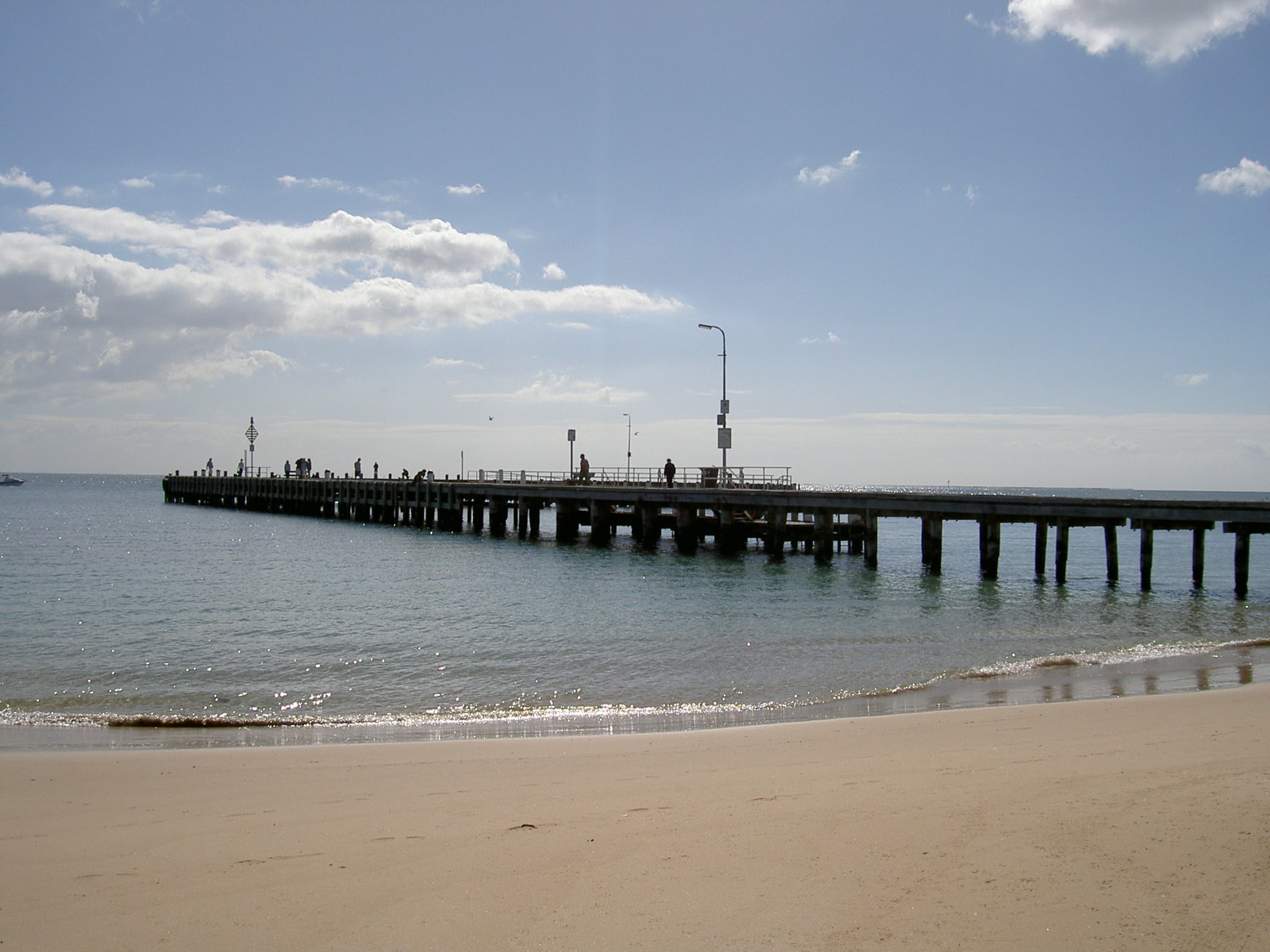
Portsea Pier

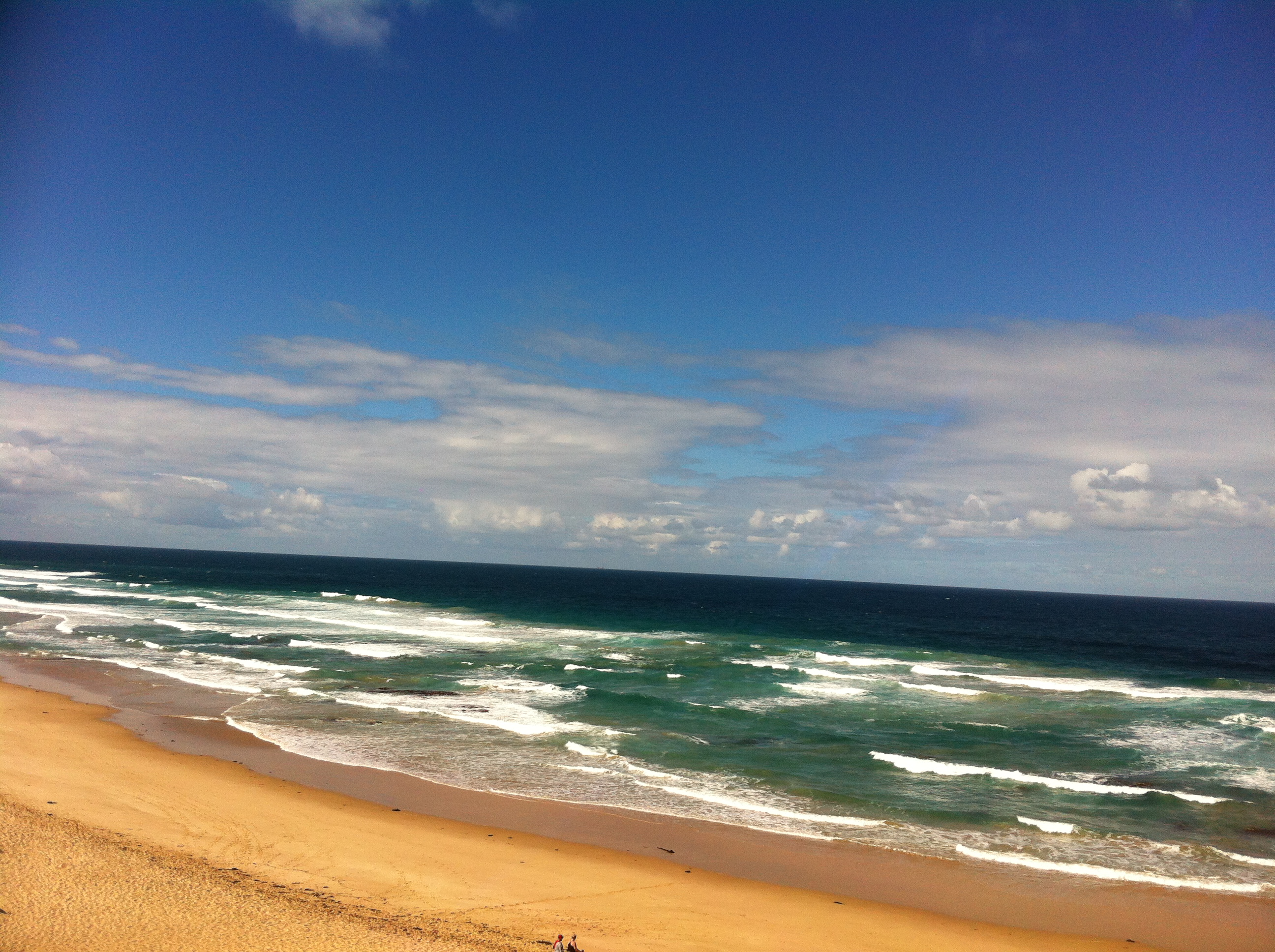
Portsea Backbeach

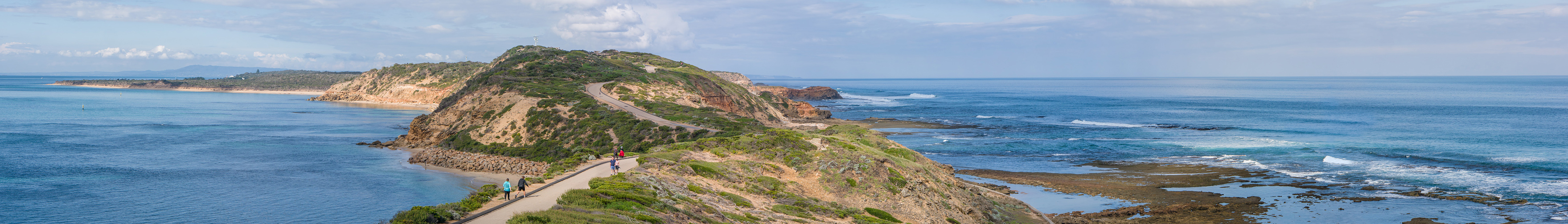
Point Nepean

Portsea is named after Portsea Island which is an island incorporated by Portsmouth, England. Portsmouth is where the first settlers to Australia set sail from.

The Portsea Post Office opened on 10 February 1877 and closed in 1987.

In January 1948 the new St Mary's School for Deaf Children was opened at Delgany, Portsea led by Kathleen Mary Egan. It was an initiative by the Dominican Sisters of Eastern Australia and the first to use oral techniques in Victoria.

OCS Portsea, an army establishment, was located just outside the town. The historic reserve became famous when Prime Minister of Australia Harold Holt disappeared while swimming inside the facility at Cheviot Beach on 17 December 1967 and was officially presumed dead two days later, although a formal inquest into his death did not take place until 2005.

=== Heritage listings ===
The following place in Portsea is listed on the Australian National Heritage List:

- Point Nepean Defence Sites and Quarantine Station Area, Coleman Road, also included on the Victorian Heritage Register

The following places in Portsea are listed on the Victorian Heritage Register:

- Delgany, also known as Delgany Castle and now known as Delgany Portsea, Nepean Highway
- Duffy's Lime Kiln, 7 Merrylands Avenue
- Fort Franklin (former), now known as The Portsea Camp, 3704 Point Nepean Road
- Ilyuka Lime Kiln and Bathing Box, Port King Road

== Present day ==
Portsea was considered by many to be the hub of Melbourne's recreational scuba diving activities. At one time there were as many as four dive shops in the main street of Portsea. Dive charter boats still travel from Portsea Pier to sites both inside Port Phillip and outside Port Phillip Heads, also known as "The Rip".

The Portsea Pier is the home to the spectacular weedy sea dragon, as well as many other fish species, including numerous pufferfish. Boating traffic is frequent, and divers should be careful to avoid main boating routes. After dredging was done to deepen the entrance to the bay for shipping there was increased surge at Portsea Pier and within a year Portsea Beach was gone. Sandbags have been placed on the once picturesque beach to prevent further sand erosion.

Portsea Back Beach is an attraction in Portsea, due to its great surfing conditions and long stretch of sand. Portsea Surf Life Saving Club patrols the popular surf beach, as patrols are always needed during the summer period given the large waves and strong tides that are often present.

Corsair Rock, just at the entrance to Port Philip, is a well-known surf spot to locals and professional surfers. However, it is not advised to surf there unless you are an experienced surfer and, for safety, are accompanied by somebody in a boat nearby. It is considered a very dangerous location. The rip can run out as fast as 8-10 knots.

Golfers play at the revered Portsea Golf Club on Relph Avenue. The annual Portsea Polo event is held at Jarman Oval, near the former quarantine station on Point Nepean.

According to the 2016 Australian Bureau of Statistics Census, Portsea had 510 residents. Prominent residents include trucking magnate Lindsay Fox, Kate Baillieu and Rupert Murdoch's grandson businessman David Calvert Jones, other well known residents are Eddie McGuire and Ron Walker.

== Popular culture ==
The Australian Crawl song "Hoochie Gucci Fiorucci Mama" (from the 1980 album The Boys Light Up) was written about Portsea.

== Climate ==
Climate data for Portsea, Victoria
Month	Jan	Feb	Mar	Apr	May	Jun	Jul	Aug	Sep	Oct	Nov	Dec	Year
Record high °C (°F)	40.4 (104.7)	38.6 (101.5)	35.6 (96.1)	29.4 (84.9)	24.4 (75.9)	18.3 (64.9)	20.0 (68.0)	20.6 (69.1)	23.6 (74.5)	32.5 (90.5)	32.1 (89.8)	36.0 (96.8)	40.4 (104.7)
Mean daily maximum °C (°F)	22.8 (73.0)	22.9 (73.2)	21.5 (70.7)	18.5 (65.3)	15.8 (60.4)	13.4 (56.1)	12.8 (55.0)	13.7 (56.7)	15.3 (59.5)	17.3 (63.1)	19.2 (66.6)	21.2 (70.2)	17.9 (64.2)
Mean daily minimum °C (°F)	13.3 (55.9)	13.9 (57.0)	13.0 (55.4)	11.2 (52.2)	9.5 (49.1)	7.5 (45.5)	6.8 (44.2)	7.1 (44.8)	7.7 (45.9)	9.1 (48.4)	10.3 (50.5)	11.8 (53.2)	10.1 (50.2)
Record low °C (°F)	7.5 (45.5)	7.5 (45.5)	6.0 (42.8)	5.0 (41.0)	3.0 (37.4)	1.5 (34.7)	0.5 (32.9)	0.0 (32.0)	0.3 (32.5)	0.8 (33.4)	3.0 (37.4)	4.7 (40.5)	0.0 (32.0)
Average rainfall mm (inches)	33.1 (1.30)	50.1 (1.97)	52.1 (2.05)	57.1 (2.25)	68.0 (2.68)	60.5 (2.38)	64.0 (2.52)	61.3 (2.41)	63.0 (2.48)	63.5 (2.50)	58.8 (2.31)	50.1 (1.97)	683.1 (26.89)
Average rainy days (≥ 1.0 mm)	3.6	3.8	5.1	7.0	9.3	9.3	9.6	9.7	8.6	8.4	6.9	5.2	86.5
Source: Australian Bureau of Meteorology

== See also ==
- Shire of Flinders – Portsea was previously within this former local government area.
- Portsea Hole – a nearby dive location
