= Ti-Tree, Northern Territory =

Ti-Tree
- Town
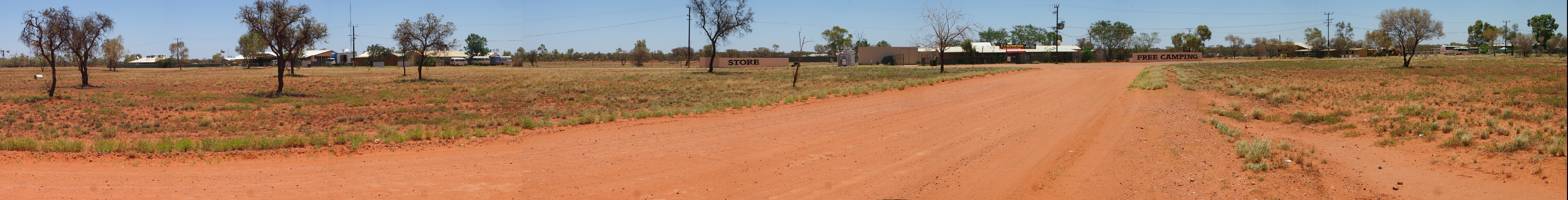

- Coordinates: 22°08′02″S 133°24′50″E
- Country: Australia
- State: Northern Territory
- LGA: Central Desert Region
- Location: 1,109 km (689 mi) S of Darwin; 195 km (121 mi) N of Alice Springs
- Established: 15 May 1981 (town); 4 April 2007 (locality)

Government
  - Territory electorate: Stuart
  - Federal division: Lingiari
- Elevation (airport): 488 m (1,601 ft)

Population
  - Total: 88 (2021 census)
- Time zone: UTC+9:30 (ACST)
- Postcode: 0872
- Mean max temp: 31.0 °C (87.8 °F)
- Mean min temp: 14.4 °C (57.9 °F)
- Annual rainfall: 315.8 mm (12.43 in)
Localities around Ti-Tree
Anmatjere	Anmatjere	Anmatjere
Anmatjere	Ti-Tree	Anmatjere
Anmatjere	Anmatjere	Anmatjere

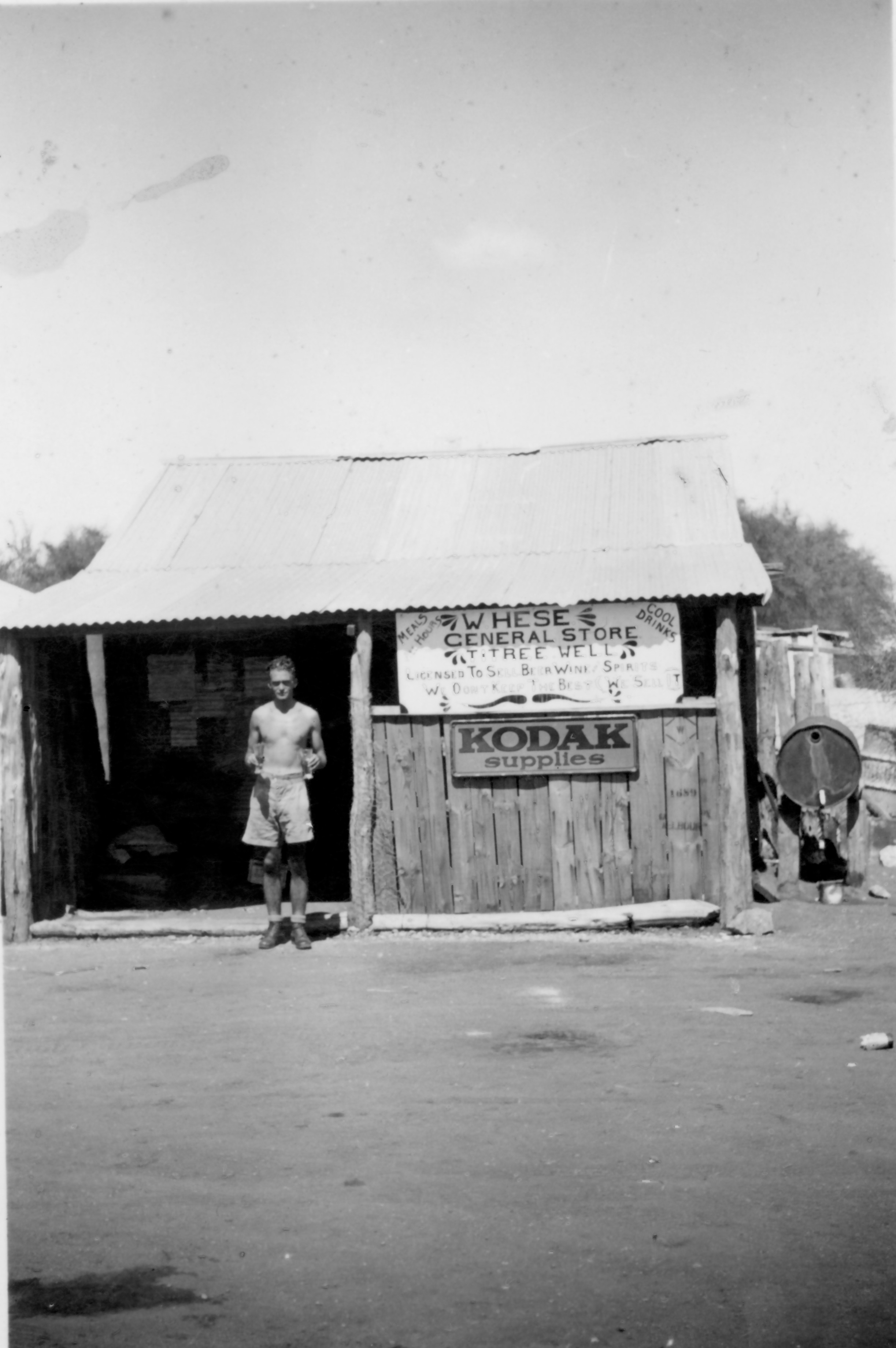
The Ti-Tree General Store in the 1940s

Ti-Tree (formerly Tea Tree and also Ti Tree) is a town and locality in the Northern Territory of Australia located on the Stuart Highway about 1,109 kilometres (689 mi) south of the territory capital of Darwin and about 193 km north of the municipal seat in Alice Springs.

At the 2021 census, Ti-Tree had a population of 88. It is the closest town to Alice Springs. The area around Ti-Tree has a population of 995 people of whom 191 are non-Aboriginal. The population is distributed between the 11 cattle stations, 6 Aboriginal outstations including Utopia, Ti-Tree township, Barrow Creek community and the agricultural produce farms of Ti-Tree Farm, Central Australian Produce Farm and the Territory Grape Farm. The area is an emerging centre for grapes and melons due to its year-round sunshine and abundant underground water supply.

== History ==
The Anmatyerre name for the area close to Ti-Tree township is Aleyaw but no one seems to know how or where the name Ti-Tree or Tea Tree came from. One of the first features in the area to be named was Tea Tree Well No. 3 (still to be seen on the western side of the highway just south of the township) which was developed during the construction of the Overland Telegraph Line.

The remains of Tea Tree Well No. 2 can be found at the southern end of the air strip.

In 1888 an area of about 64 km incorporating the well was formally set aside as the Tea Tree Telegraph Reserve and in 1919 W. J. 'Bill' Heffernan was granted a lease to a parcel of land which he called Tea Tree Station. The current station covers an area of 3584 km^{2}.

Since the construction of the Overland Telegraph Line, Tea Tree Well had become known for its good supply of sweet water but this was not enough to make Heffernan's labours financially rewarding. By 1935 the run was poorly improved with primitive buildings and no horse or bullock paddocks. Heffernan died in Alice Springs in 1969 and the station was carried on by his widow.

In 1975, Ian Dahlenburg took up 2.6 square kilometres (640 acres) of the station and established Dahlenburg Horticultural Enterprise which now grows grapes and watermelons on Ti-Tree Farm.

In 1976, Tea Tree Station was sold to the Aboriginal Land Fund Commission and became a subject of a land claim on behalf of the local Aboriginal people. Much of the area surrounding Ti Tree township is now within the bounds of the Ahakeye Land Trust, an Aboriginal Freehold Lease.

In 1980, the local community petitioned the Northern Territory Legislative Assembly to change the spelling from "Tea Tree" to "Ti-Tree". On 15 May 1981, the area of the town was gazetted and on 22 April 1983, its name was officially changed to "Ti-Tree".

In 1994, the town was incorporated into the Anmatjere Community Government Council.

In 2007, boundaries for the locality of Ti-Tree which match those of the town were gazetted.

== Current ==
Ti-Tree is the first substantial stop heading north from Alice Springs and is the largest community between Alice Springs and Tennant Creek. There is a hotel, a school and a police station along with several other buildings. Petrol and other traveller facilities are available.

Much of the land surrounding Ti-Tree is Aboriginal land, owned by the Anmatyerre people. Their art can be viewed within the town and there are several interesting sites in the area surrounding the township. The town serves as a service town to surrounding Aboriginal Communities.

Ti-Tree is the centre for a vegetable-producing area, producing fresh vegetables and fruit for Territory markets, with an annual table-grape harvest alone reaping $10 million.

== Ti-Tree School ==
Ti-Tree School is located at 26 Palmer Street in Ti-Tree. It is a school operated by the Northern Territory Government. In 2018, the school offered Reception to Year 9, had a total enrolment of 80 students of which 96% were indigenous and had a teaching staff of six who was supported by seven non-teaching personnel.

== Climate ==
Climate data for Ti-Tree (Territory Grape Farm), elevation 566 m (1,857 ft), (1993–2020 normals, extremes 1987–present)
Month	Jan	Feb	Mar	Apr	May	Jun	Jul	Aug	Sep	Oct	Nov	Dec	Year
Record high °C (°F)	46.2 (115.2)	45.6 (114.1)	43.5 (110.3)	39.0 (102.2)	34.9 (94.8)	32.8 (91.0)	33.1 (91.6)	35.9 (96.6)	38.8 (101.8)	41.6 (106.9)	43.6 (110.5)	45.9 (114.6)	46.2 (115.2)
Mean daily maximum °C (°F)	37.4 (99.3)	36.5 (97.7)	34.7 (94.5)	30.9 (87.6)	25.6 (78.1)	22.4 (72.3)	22.8 (73.0)	25.4 (77.7)	30.4 (86.7)	33.4 (92.1)	35.8 (96.4)	36.5 (97.7)	31.0 (87.8)
Mean daily minimum °C (°F)	22.2 (72.0)	21.7 (71.1)	19.7 (67.5)	14.7 (58.5)	9.5 (49.1)	6.1 (43.0)	5.2 (41.4)	6.9 (44.4)	11.9 (53.4)	15.7 (60.3)	19.0 (66.2)	21.3 (70.3)	14.5 (58.1)
Record low °C (°F)	13.5 (56.3)	11.0 (51.8)	9.8 (49.6)	4.9 (40.8)	−1.7 (28.9)	−2.1 (28.2)	−3.0 (26.6)	−4.0 (24.8)	1.1 (34.0)	4.5 (40.1)	7.8 (46.0)	11.2 (52.2)	−4.0 (24.8)
Average rainfall mm (inches)	70.2 (2.76)	63.2 (2.49)	19.5 (0.77)	16.9 (0.67)	19.8 (0.78)	8.5 (0.33)	5.0 (0.20)	3.2 (0.13)	10.8 (0.43)	14.7 (0.58)	26.8 (1.06)	62.0 (2.44)	320.6 (12.64)
Average rainy days (≥ 1.0 mm)	4.8	4.4	2.1	1.4	2.1	1.1	0.7	0.5	1.1	2.6	3.7	5.2	29.7
Source: Australian Bureau of Meteorology

== See also ==
- Ti-Tree Airfield
