= School camp =

Form of field trip

School camp is a form of education (typically implemented within primary schools) involving a field trip with a class' teachers to a place of natural or touristic significance. They carry some names, such as rinkangakkou (林間学校, forest school) in Japan, Schullandheim (school hostel, school camp) in Germany, zielona szkoła (green school) in Poland, and schoolkamp (school camp) in the Netherlands.

== History ==
During the 19th century, taking schoolchildren on outside trips was widely practiced, supposedly improving their health. In Japan, rinkangakkou was developed during the Showa period, influenced by the German Ferienkolonie. In most of Europe and Japan, the tradition is still upheld by many schools.
