= Swamp gum =

Swamp gum is a common name for a number of Eucalyptus species known for inhabiting swamp lands.

These include:

- Eucalyptus bensonii, Mountain swamp gum
- Eucalyptus camphora, Mountain swamp gum
- Eucalyptus ovata, Swamp gum
- Eucalyptus regnans, Swamp gum
- Eucalyptus rudis, Swamp gum
