= Tea tree =

Tea tree or tea-tree may refer to:

== Plants ==
- Camellia sinensis (aka Thea sinensis), from which black, green, oolong and white tea are all obtained
- Melaleuca species in the family Myrtaceae, sources for tea tree oil
- Leptospermum species, also in the family Myrtaceae, source for mānuka honey
- Kunzea ericoides, known as white tea-tree or kānuka, a tree or shrub of New Zealand
- Taxandria parviceps, also in the family Myrtaceae
- species of Lycium, including
  - Lycium europaeum or European teatree
  - Lycium barbarum or Duke of Argyll's tea tree
- Cordyline australis, known as tī kōuka in Māori

== Geography ==
- Tea Tree, the former name of Ti-Tree, Northern Territory, a town and locality in Australia
- Tea Tree Gully, a council in Adelaide, Australia
- Westfield Tea Tree Plaza, a shopping centre in Adelaide, Australia
- Tea Tree, Tasmania, a locality in Southern Tasmania

== See also ==
- Ti-Tree (disambiguation)
