= Lind House =

Heritage-listed house in Melbourne, Victoria, Australia

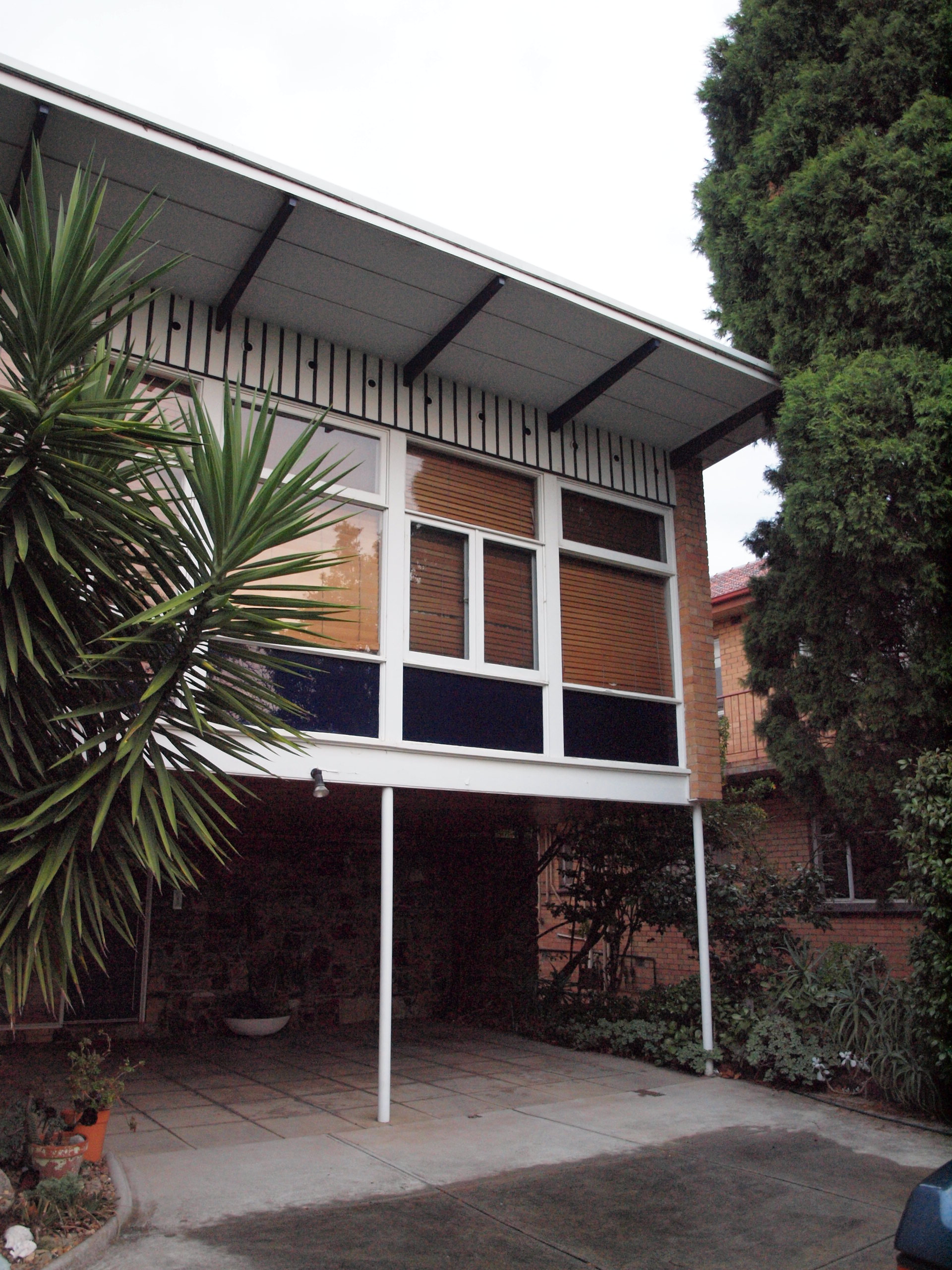
- The street front, with the curtain-walled bedrooms supported above the carport.

- Location of the house in Greater Metropolitan Melbourne

General information
- Status: Completed
- Type: House
- Architectural style: Post-war Modernist
- Location: 450 Dandenong Road, Caulfield North, City of Glen Eira, Melbourne, Victoria, Australia
- Coordinates: 37°51′47″S 145°01′08″E
- Completed: 1956; 70 years ago
- Renovated: c. 2018

Technical details
- Material: Stone; bricks; steel; timber
- Grounds: 843 m^{2} (9,070 sq ft)

Design and construction
- Architect: Anatol Kagan
- Main contractor: Stevens Waters

Website
- lind.house

Victorian Heritage Register
- Official name: Lind House
- Type: Registered place
- Criteria: d., and h.
- Designated: 14 June 2018
- Reference no.: VHR H2387
- Heritage overlay no.: HO155
- Category: Residential buildings (private)

The Lind House is a house located at 450 Dandenong Road in Caulfield North, in the City of Glen Eira, in the inner eastern suburbs of Melbourne, in Victoria, Australia.

Built in 1956 on the traditional lands of the Bunurong people, the house was added to the Victorian Heritage Register on 14 June 2018 in recognition of its historical and architectural significance; and was also added to a non-statutory list by the Victorian branch of the National Trust.

== History ==
Designed by Anatol Kagan in 1956 for Polish-Jewish emigre Leo Lind and his wife Dorothy. Born in Russia on 4 October 1913, Kagan's career as an architect spanned over seven decades until his death on 2 July 2009. He was actively involved in the field of design, as well as a writer, translator, lecturer and political activist. The house is an important work of its period demonstrating the post-war Modernist architectural movement of Melbourne during the mid-20th century. Kagan was also influenced by the works of his local contemporaries, Roy Grounds, Frederick Romberg and Robin Boyd.

In July 2017 an application to demolish the house and construct eight dwellings, between two-to-three storeys, above a basement car park, was rejected by the Glen Eira Council, who then pressed for the house to be added to the Victorian Heritage Register. In the interim, the house was sold in September 2017 for approximately A$2.1–$2.3 million and subsequently extensively renovated, and its Modernist feel retained with contemporary features.

== Description ==
Built by Stevens Waters, the two-storey butterfly-roofed Modernist freestanding five-bedroom house is sited centrally within a trapezoidal block of approximately 843 square metres (9,070 sq ft). The house is composed of protruding bays and timber mullioned window walls, shaded by deep eaves, stone and brick construction with steel supports. The upper level is extensively glazed, flooding the living areas with natural light. The house has a shallow butterfly roof, almost flat at the rear, sloping up to the front. The ground level includes only ancillary spaces and the entry foyer, with the living quarters and four of the bedrooms upstairs. Interiors of most of the upper-storey rooms contain original finishes and joinery, and some light fittings, with extensive bespoke built-in timber joinery and furniture, including upholstered finishes such as the in-built headboard in the master bedroom, and the living room sliding door.

== Key influences ==
Kagan trained in Germany in the early 1930s when Modernism held sway, emigrating to Australia in 1939. The style of glazing is representative of the Modernist movement and follows a staggered rectangle pattern with a blue-coloured fill on the lowest panes. The glazing style is attributed to Kenneth McDonald's house at Vermont. Kagan worked with some of the prominent architectural practices of the 20th century, which included Seabrook and Fildes, Joseph Plotel, and with Walter Gropius. The influence of the designs of these practices is aesthetically evident in Kagan's design for the Lind House. Using materials consistently throughout the design such as brick, stone, and concrete for the main structure, and using the motif of the flat roof were also popular of Australian architecture in the 1950s. The house is designed consistently with the style of Kagan's other projects around that time, however does not include a street-facing balcony, which is an element that many of Kagan's residential projects demonstrate.

== See also ==
- Architecture of Melbourne
- List of places on the Victorian Heritage Register in the City of Glen Eira
