= Combe Martin (disambiguation) =

Combe Martin is a village in North Devon, England.

It may also refer to:

- Manor of Combe Martin, a former medieval manor estate in Combe Martin, Devon, England.
- Combe Martin, Mornington, a heritage-listed house in Melbourne, Victoria, Australia.
