= Brunswick Fire Station and Flats =

Heritage-listed fire station in Melbourne, Victoria, Australia

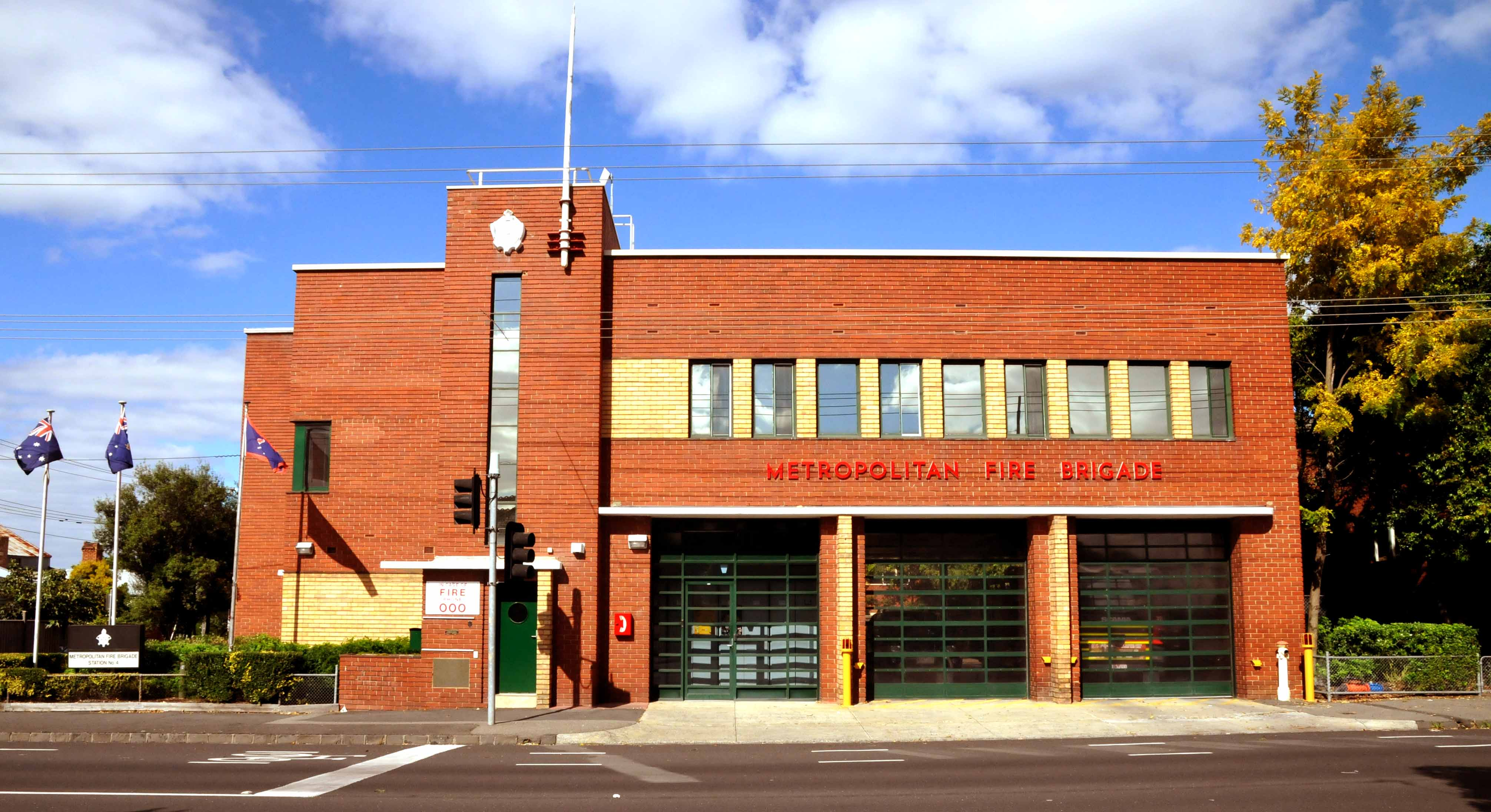
- The fire station, from Blyth Street, 2012

- Location within Melbourne
- Interactive map of the Brunswick Fire Station and Flats area

General information
- Status: Completed
- Type: Fire station and apartments
- Architectural style: Inter-war Functionalist & Moderne
- Location: 24 Blyth Street, Brunswick, Melbourne, Victoria, Australia
- Coordinates: 37°45′57″S 144°57′54″E
- Client: Melbourne Metropolitan Fire Brigade

Technical details
- Material: Red bricks
- Floor count: 2

Design and construction
- Architecture firm: Seabrook and Fildes

Victorian Heritage Register
- Official name: Brunswick Fire Station and Flats
- Type: Registered place
- Designated: 6 May 1992
- Reference no.: H0916
- Heritage overlay no.: HO26
- Categories: Utilities - Fire Control; Residential buildings (private)

The Brunswick Fire Station and Flats is a fire station and staff apartments, located at 24 Blyth Street, Brunswick, an inner-northern suburb of Melbourne in Victoria, Australia. Constructed in 1937–1938 and designed by Seabrook and Fildes in the Inter-war Functionalist & Moderne style, it was the first fire station commissioned by the Melbourne Metropolitan Fire Brigade to embrace a Modernist ideology.

The building was added to the Victorian Heritage Register on 6 May 1992 in recognition of its historical and architectural significance. The site was also added to non-statutory lists by the Victorian branch of the National Trust on 15 April 1992 and by the City of Merri-bek in c. 1990.

== History ==
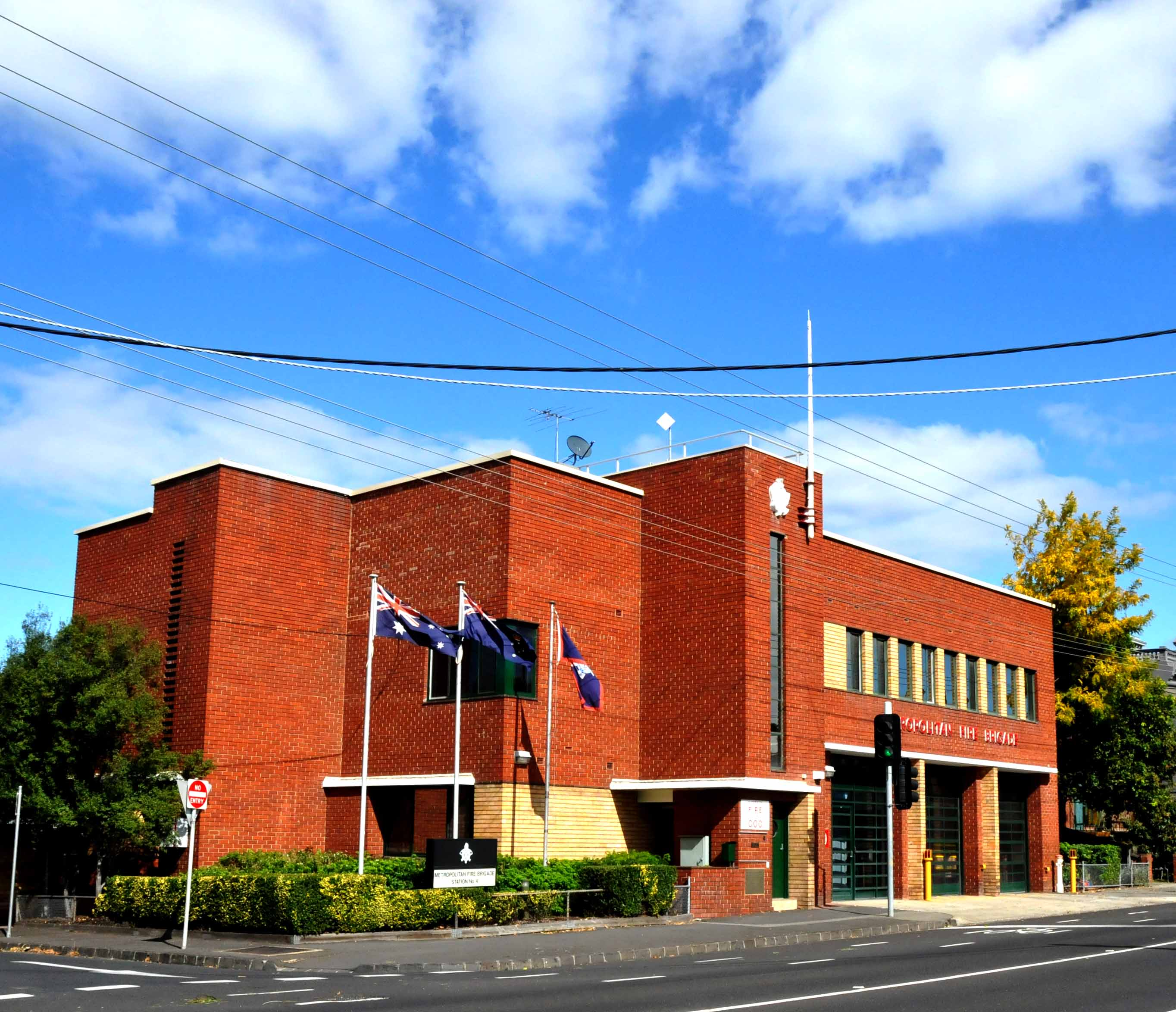
Northeast perspective of the station

The Brunswick fire station and flats were designed by Seabrook and Fildes in 1936 and the builders were 7 Mann Pty Limited. The station opened for use in 1937. Seabrook's father, who was Chairman of the Metropolitan Fire Brigade at the time, was no doubt influential in ensuring his son's practice was awarded the contract, the first of twelve the firm designed which included the stations at Camberwell (1938), Brighton (1939) and Windsor (1941).

The Brunswick fire station and flats is the first fire station complex in Victoria which indicates the change in the architectural policy of the Metropolitan Fire Brigade from conservative period styling to the latest modern architecture from Europe. The Brunswick fire station and flats are a rare and perhaps the only example of a separate fire station building and flat block complex which forms its own residential precinct, indicative of modern urban planning then occurring in Europe in the 1930s. The significance of the complex is enhanced by its continuing use as an operating fire station.

The Brunswick fire station and flats are one of the most significant works of the noted architects Seabrook and Fildes, who are acknowledged as bringing European modern architecture to Victoria in 1934 in the form of the buildings at the MacRobertson Girls' High School.

The buildings are an example of the vocabulary of modern architecture derived from the work of Dutch architect Willem Dudok, whose expertise with brick construction brought a new meaning to the concept of modern architecture and its exportability to countries such as Australia and Great Britain.

== Description ==
The Brunswick Fire Station incorporates two vehicle spaces, for fire trucks, with two large doors (formerly three) facing Blyth Street, a watch room, toilets and offices. At the time of its construction, the station boasted state-of-the-art fire fighting equipment and alarm systems. The fire station was MFB's Northern Zone headquarters for many years and housed two fire appliances, as well as a station wagon for the zone inspector. These zone functions were moved to the new Thomastown fire station by 1989.

The planning reflects a functionalist sensibility, where the station's various activities are organised into zones that are expressed externally in a series of interlocking cubic forms. The building's keynote vertical element, for instance, conceals the main staircase and boldly protrudes beyond the façade, bearing the station's flagpole. Although telephony had long surpassed spotters as the means of detecting blazes, this tower is evocative of pre-Federation days when stations such as Smith and Johnson's Eastern Hill Fire Station in East Melbourne (1891–1893) were invariably positioned on high ground, and denotes the building's important and enduring civic presence.

The accommodation for the firemen and their families was originally located in two separate two-storey residential blocks of flats at the rear of the main building. Sizeable garden courtyards were positioned between the flats and station, providing abundant northern light to the residences. Ground floor planter boxes further enhanced the connection between home and landscape.

With the introduction of shift work, the need for resident fire fighters disappeared. Only the southernmost residential block remains, located on the corner of Burchett and Barningham Streets.

=== Architecture ===
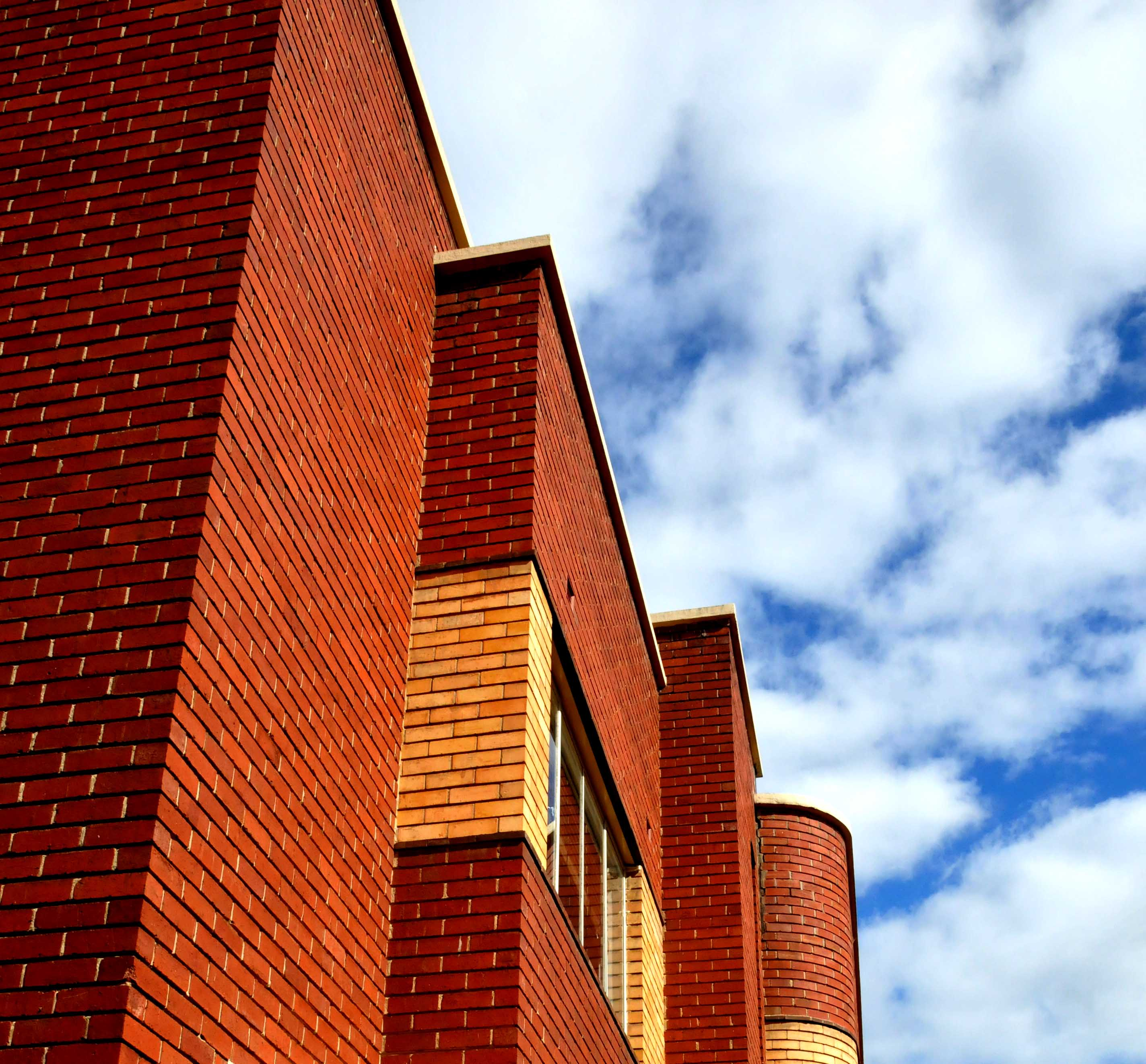
Brick detail

The most noteworthy exponents of the Inter-War Functionalist style in Australia were young architects who in their formative years had made trips to Europe. Norman Seabrook was one such professional, and along with his practice partner Alan Fildes, played an invaluable, but often unstated role in the development of Modernist architecture in Melbourne.

In the decades prior to Seabrook and Fildes' first fire station project, polite Georgian revivalist designs were the norm for the Melbourne Metropolitan Fire Brigade, often resembling overblown houses featuring squat red brick walls and hipped roofs with prominent eaves. The Brunswick design irrevocably broke this mould.

Numerous historians point to Willem Dudok's Hilversum Town Hall as the major influence on Seabrook and Fildes' aesthetic, particularly in the firm's adoption of De-Stijl compositional techniques. This is clearly evident is Brunswick station's use of prismatic forms, horizontal window banding, cantilevered hoods over fenestrations, flat roofs and minimal ornamentation save for the striking sans serif lettering above the garage doors. Cream brickwork is also strongly associated with Dutch Modernism, however here its usage has special significance, as this colour was first introduced to the local market by Brunswick brick maker John Glew in the 1850s.

In the 1930s, eclecticism pervaded apartment designs in Melbourne, with practitioners such as Howard Lawson, Roy Grounds and Taylor, Soilleux and Overend seeking to overcome Australia's long standing prejudice against high-density living by promoting economical but contemporary solutions that adopted variously, and often in the one project, Modernist, Moderne, Georgian revivalist and Californian inspired styles.

Seabrook and Fildes, however, stuck resolutely to their Modernist principles, incorporating the ideas of Frank Lloyd Wright and the International Style into their flat designs with elements such as sizable expanses of glass, built-in furniture and direct engagement with the surrounding landscape. The Brunswick site's two rectilinear apartment blocks were orientated in the zeilenbau style, that is parallel to each other and aligned at right angles to Burchett Street. Dating back to the German municipal estates of the 1920s, the aim of this layout was to provide maximum sunlight, airflow and quietude, with equal access to the grounds for all inhabitants.

The logical simplicity of the Brunswick design influenced numerous contemporaries, as seen at Winbush's fire station in Kew (1941) and Henderson and Cuthbert's fire station in Forrest, Canberra (1939).

== See also ==
- Architecture of Melbourne
- List of fire stations
- List of places on the Victorian Heritage Register in the City of Merri-bek
