= Anatol Kagan =

Russian-Australian architect (1913–2009)

- Born: 4 October 1913; Saint Petersburg, Russia
- Died: 2 July 2009 (aged 95); Hunters Hill, New South Wales, Australia
- Occupation: Architect
- Practice: Anatol Kagan & Associates
- Buildings: Mount Scopus Memorial College
- Projects: Beaufort House

Anatol Kagan (4 October 1913, St. Petersburg, Russian Empire – 2 July 2009, Hunters Hill, Australia) was a Russian-born Australian architect. Over a professional career that spanned more than seven decades, and three continents, Kagan was active not only in the field of architecture and design but also as a writer, translator, lecturer and political activist.

== Early life and training ==
Born in St Petersburg, Kagan was the son of Abraham S Kagan (rus. Абрам Каган; 1889 - 1983) - a university lecturer/publisher and a school teacher. As a young child, Anatol witnessed the atrocities of the Russian Revolution, which aroused a deep concern for social justice that would remain with him for the rest of his life. In 1922, Kagan's father became one of many intellectuals to be exiled from the new Soviet Union aboard the so-called Philosophers' Ships. The family settled in Berlin, where Kagan's father re-established his publishing business and Kagan himself commenced his architectural studies at the Technische Universität Berlin. Completing his Diploma of Architecture in 1937, Kagan found himself unable to obtain work in Berlin, as he was a foreigner. This, coupled with the increasingly unstable political situation in Germany at the time, prompted the family to leave Berlin. Intending to emigrate to Australia, Kagan travelled to Melbourne via London, where he worked for a few months in an architect's office. His parents and younger sister settled in the United States, and Kagan would not see them again until 1962.

== Architectural career ==
After arriving in Melbourne in 1939, Kagan worked in the offices of several prominent architectural firms of the day, including Hugh & Arthur Peck, Seabrook & Fildes, Joseph Plottel, and Geelong-based firm of Buchan, Laird & Buchan. By 1942, he had commenced his own private architectural practice in partnership with a friend and fellow Russian emigre, Yuri Blumin. Their firm, styled as Blumin & Kagan, undertook several projects, including a box factory and an apartment block, that were published in contemporary books and journals. However, the promising partnership ended prematurely when wartime building restrictions brought Australia's construction industry to a virtual standstill.

Kagan then entered the government sector, working for the Department of Works & Housing on the design of military camps. He was subsequently involved in the development of the Beaufort House, a prototypical steel dwelling that was designed by architect (and one-time employee of Walter Gropius) Arthur Baldwinson. After the War, Kagan decided to recommence his private practice with his former government colleague, Albert Young together with his erstwhile pre-war partner, Yuri Blumin, and Blumin's army friend William Millar. The practice specialised in large luxurious residences for wealthy businessmen, many of whom were members of Melbourne's thriving post-war Jewish emigre community. It was such links that led to Kagan being selected as design architect for the new campus of Mount Scopus Memorial College in Burwood.

In 1957, Kagan participated in the competition for the Sydney Opera House, which he prepared during a brief stay in that city. While his entry was unplaced, his drawings were later displayed as part of an exhibition to celebrate the 50th anniversary of the competition in 2007. As the only surviving competitor from the original competition at that time, Kagan spoke briefly at the opening of the exhibition, and recorded an audio guide that explained the philosophy behind his own entry.

By 1960, Kagan had tired of designing luxury houses for moneyed businessmen. Wishing to create buildings that might have a more profound impact on society, he took a position with the Public Works Department in Sydney, where he was involved in the design of high school buildings and, later, mental hospitals. He remained employed there until his retirement in 1973.

== Political activist ==
Kagan's left-wing political leanings were heavily influenced by the circumstances of his early life and upbringing: witnessing the Russian Revolution and its aftermath during the late 1910s, his family's expulsion from Russia in the 1920s, and the discrimination of Nazi regime in Berlin in the 1930s. As a teenager, Kagan read the works of Leon Trotsky and subsequently embraced socialist thinking. After settling in Australia, Kagan became associated with the Sydney-based Balmain Trotskyists, led by Nick Origlass, and would remain a member of the Australian Labor Party for the rest of his life. To honour his contribution and dedication in the party, he was awarded life membership of ALP in 1994 and, after his death, his family received personal message of condolence from three one-time Labour Prime Ministers: Paul Keating, Kevin Rudd and Bob Hawke.

As the longest serving Australian Labor Prime Minister, I pay tribute to Anatol Kagan for his devotion and dedication to our great Party. A member of the Party for the last sixty three years, of which the last fifteen have been as a Life Member, Anatol will be remembered as someone who was totally committed to his ideas and ideals for a peaceful, free and just world. Through this philosophy, he lived a rich and rewarding life, fulfilled in the hope and knowledge that his efforts were directed to fairness and equality of opportunity for all. I thank him for his efforts and send my condolences to his family. Vale a True Believer.

— Bob Hawke

== See also ==
- Lind House
