= Combe Martin, Mornington =

Heritage-listed house in Melbourne, Victoria, Australia

Combe Martin
- Location of the house in Greater Metropolitan Melbourne
- Etymology: Combe Martin, in North Devon

General information
- Status: Completed
- Type: House
- Architectural style: Inter-war Old English
- Location: 819–820 The Esplanade, Mornington, Mornington Peninsula, Melbourne, Victoria, Australia
- Coordinates: 38°12′51″S 145°02′40″E
- Year built: 1939–1940
- Completed: 1940; 86 years ago
- Cost: A£20,000
- Client: Charles and Emily Ruwolt

Technical details
- Material: Clinker brick; shingle tiles; cedar; blackwood; stained glass; copper; marble
- Floor count: 2
- Floor area: 743 m^{2} (8,000 sq ft)
- Grounds: 2,023 m^{2} (21,780 sq ft)

Design and construction
- Architecture firm: Seabrook and Fildes

Victorian Heritage Register
- Official name: Combe Martin
- Type: Registered place
- Designated: 28 September 2000
- Reference no.: H1900
- Heritage overlay no.: HO76
- Category: Residential buildings (private)

Register of the National Estate
- Official name: Combe Martin
- Type: Defunct register

Combe Martin is a house located at 819–820 The Esplanade in Mornington, on the Mornington Peninsula, in the south eastern suburbs of Melbourne, in Victoria, Australia.

Built in 1940 on the traditional lands of the Bunurong people, the house was added to the Victorian Heritage Register on 28 September 2000 in recognition of its architectural and historica significance; and, on unknown dates, was also added to non-statutory lists by the Victorian branch of the National Trust and the now defunct Register of the National Estate.

== History ==
=== Development of Mornington ===
Known as Schnapper Point until 1964, Mornington developed as a fishing village and local agricultural centre. Its road connections to Melbourne were poor. However, once the jetty was built in 1857, a steamer visited twice-weekly. The possibilities of the Mornington Peninsula as a seaside resort were commented on as early as the 1850s A number of hotels that could accommodate summer visitors were built at Mornington in the 1860s and 1870s. As the roads improved, access from Melbourne became easier. The railway line to Mornington was opened in September 1889.

Mornington in the twentieth century continued to flourish as a tourist destination. At the time of the Centenary Celebrations in 1934, the town was described as having "a series of beautiful red bluffs, with lovely, clean beaches, said by many travellers to be the best in the world. The natural beauty of the foreshore is jealously guarded by a local committee." Affluent Melbourne families sought a holiday retreat, close to the city where they could spend school holidays and they could come to relax at weekends. Mornington offered a combination of safe beaches for swimming and sailing and proximity to rural land for hobby farming and horse riding.

=== The house ===
Combe Martin on The Esplanade, opposite Mills Beach, was built for Charles Ruwolt, managing director of Charles Ruwolt Pty Ltd, iron and steel manufacturers, and his wife, Emily.

==== Charles Ruwolt ====
Charles Ernest Ruwolt was born in Mecklenburgh, Germany in 1873 and migrated with his parents in 1878. His family farmed at Mount Gambier, South Australia. Charles Ruwolt was educated in South Australian government high and technical schools and was apprenticed in 1886–90 with James Martin & Co., machinery manufacturers at Gawler; and studied engineering at Gawler Technical School. He worked for various Victorian foundries and engineering manufacturers including James Alston & Co., Warrnambool, the Phoenix Foundry, Ballarat, Australia Otis, South Melbourne, and Thompsons of Castlemaine.

Ruwolt married Emily, née Loch, at Warrnambool in 1898 and they subsequently had three sons. The family's Melbourne residence was in Toorak; with a rural property, 'Yarramundi' (Note: Also spelled as 'Yarramundee'.) located in Mulwala, New South Wales; and Combe Martin as their summer holiday home.

He opened his own foundry at Wangaratta in 1902, and made windmills (see also Altson at Green Gables) and repaired farm machinery initially. However he developed a specialty in mining dredges in the next decade, and exported to the Malay states, Siam, the Philippines, South Africa, and New Zealand. The firm Charles Ruwolt P/L moved to Richmond in 1914 and in six years was a public company.

After 1922, the firm diversified into heavy industrial machinery, including road-making equipment, crushing machinery for mining and hydraulic presses for the car industry. By the late 1930s, when Combe Martin was built, his engineering firm and steel foundry were among the largest in the country, the plant occupied over 8 hectares (20 acres) with approximately 600–700 employees. Its steel foundry was one of the largest and best-equipped in the country. During World War II, the firm was deployed to manufacture field artillery, and employed 2,000 workers, manufactured light artillery and trench mortars. The firm developed the 11-kilogram (25 lb) short-gun howitzer, which could be broken up into its components for easy transport.

Ruwolt held a senior position in the wartime administrator of home-front resources, as a member of an eight-member central control board of the Department of Munitions from June 1940. After his death in November 1946, the firm was purchased by Vickers Limited (UK) in 1948, and continued to trade as Vickers Ruwolt.

==== House history ====
Combe Martin was built by Charles Ruwolt and his wife, Emily, between 1939 and 1940, at a cost of A£20,000. Upon Charles Ruwolt's death, the house was sold in 1947 for A£19,500.

Later owners included, jointly, the Hattam family with Ian Lonie, from the 1960s. The Hattam family included Jean (widow), John (director), David (buyer), and Robert (salesman) Hattam. In the late 1960s, Combe Martin was owned by Ian & Paula McKenzie, oil distributors, formerly of Tanti Avenue; and in the early 1970s, Iris Gray subdivided the rear yard into two lots facing Morell Street.

The five-bedroom, four-bathroom house, with parking for four cars, was sold in 2014 for c.A$3.5 million.

== Description ==
Combe Martin is a two-storey clinker brick and shingle-tiled residence, constructed as a holiday house for the successful iron and steel manufacturer, Charles Ruwolt and his family between 1939 and 1940. The 743-square-metre (8,000 sq ft) house was designed in the Inter-war Old English (Note: Also known as Tudorbethan or Neo-Tudor.) style by Norman Seabrook and Alan L. Fildes, partners in the noted architectural firm of Seabrook and Fildes. The house is elaborately detailed, inside and out; and its size and style were unusual in a seaside setting. Similar houses of the period were more commonly found in the affluent suburbs of Melbourne, such as Toorak or South Yarra. Combe Martin included servants quarters, probably for a permanent staff of a married couple. Land at the rear was subdivided.

The attention to detail shown in the house's fittings was consistent with the owner's interest in engineering design. For example, a closet under the cedar stairs contains a board for 138 keys to all doors and cupboards in the house. The steeply pitched roofs can be inspected readily by means of specially designed walkways. The copper rainwater hoods for Combe Martin were manufactured in the Ruwolt foundry. There is extensive polished blackwood timber paneling throughout.

The stained glass window over the stairs was commissioned to commemorate the original owner and his profession. It was designed by William Wheeldon, manager and stained glass artist at the firm of Brooks Robinson. It features a portrait of Charles Ruwolt with his tools in his role as engineer together with an image of Saint Giles, the patron saint of engineering.

A butler's pantry, and linen room were included in the house, which was probably run by a permanent staff of a married couple carrying out the duties of a cook and butler. A small secondary kitchen was provided for the owners’ wife to bake on Sunday afternoons without interfering with the servants. This room and the servants’ bedroom demonstrate the organisation of a household in the 1930s, before the almost complete disappearance of household servants in Australia during and after World War II.

Seabrook and Fildes designed the MacRobertson Girls’ High School buildings in 1934, and a series of twelve fire stations in Melbourne in the 1930s and 1940s. They are better known for their institutional work, much of which was heavily influenced by the International Modernism movement, and particularly by Dutch architect Willem Dudok.

An important garden, fence and paving, surrounds the house on a 2,023-square-metre (21,780 sq ft) site. Completed in a similar style to Dendron (q.v), Combe Martin has a steeply hipped main roof, with expressed chimneys attached to the front and side elevations, some with coupled upper shafts and all with terracotta pots. Brick patterns and special coursing provide much of the visual interest in this house, extending to the brick fence and garden paving. Gabled projecting room bays of differing sizes and arched porch openings also promote the picturesque combination of forms inherent in the style. Both Dendron and Combe Martin represent another stylistic phase to Mornington's beach houses where large villas typically seen in the metropolitan area were built by the sea as summer houses, in place of the consciously rural Bungalow or chalet designs used late last and early this century for summer house designs on the peninsula.

== Etymology ==
Emily Ruwolt was born in the hamlet of Combe Martin, in North Devon, England.

== See also ==
- Architecture of Melbourne
- List of places on the Victorian Heritage Register in the Shire of Mornington Peninsula
