= Seabrook and Fildes =

Australian architecture firm

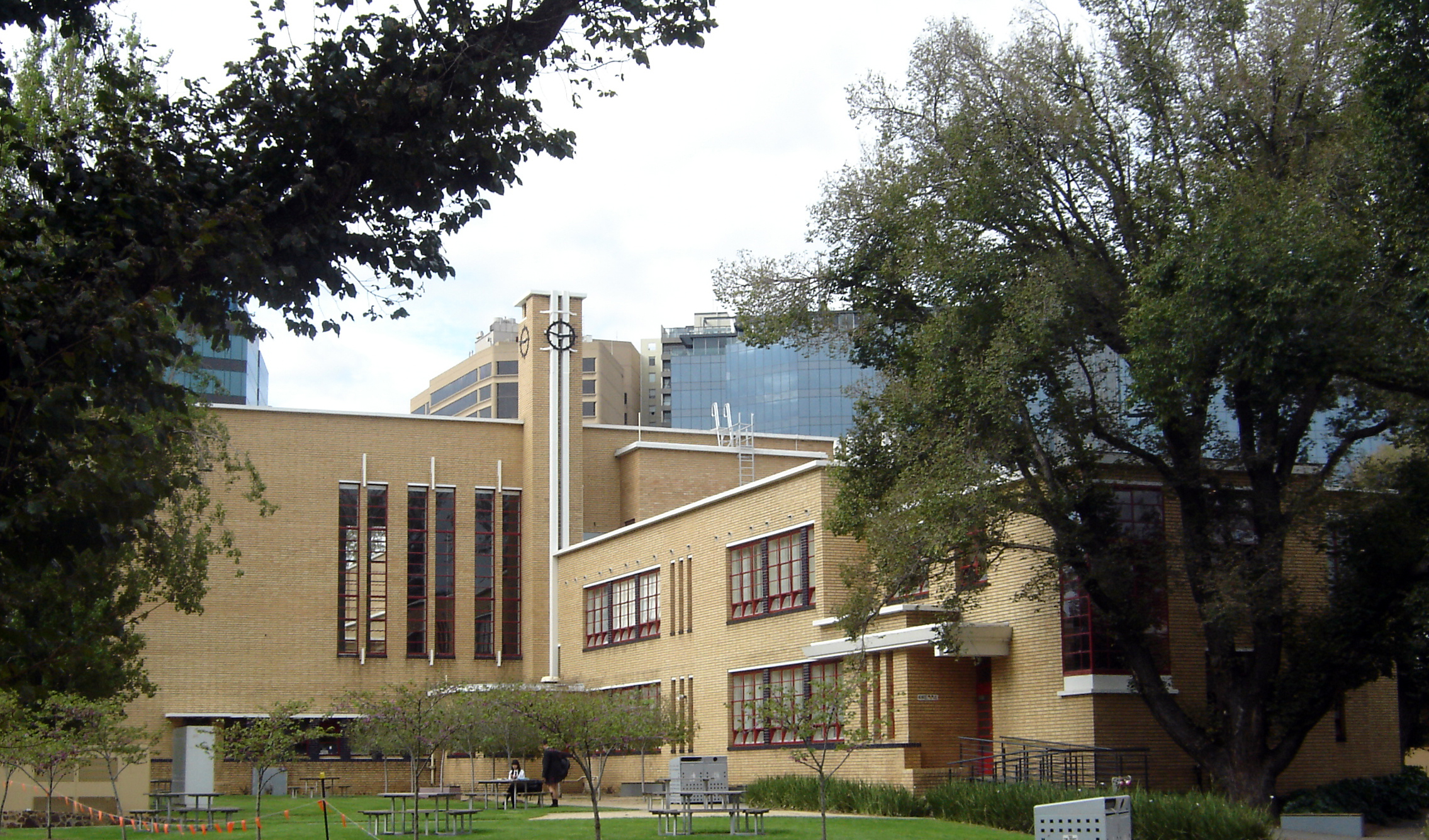
Mac.Robertson Girls' High School, 1934

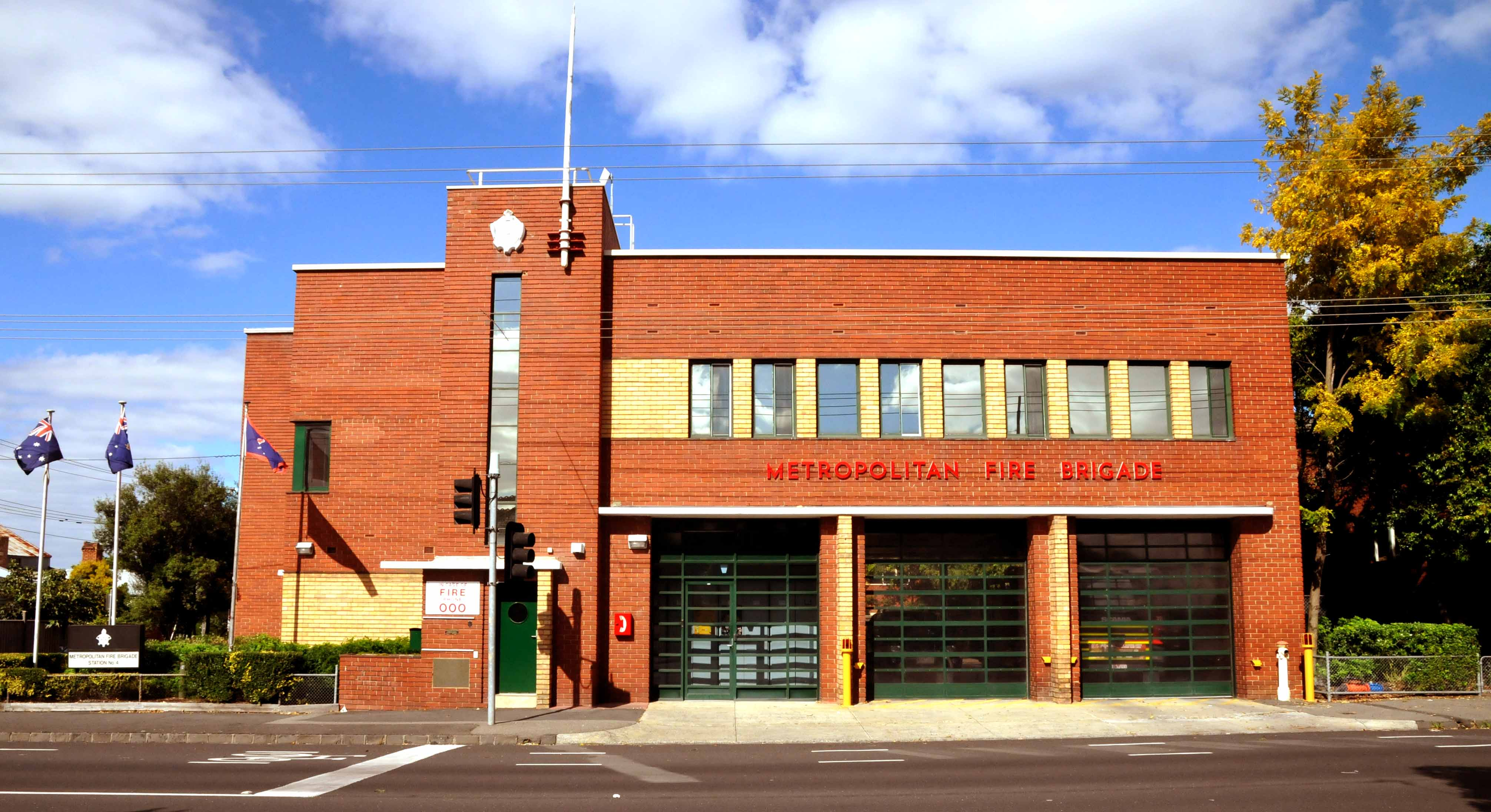
Brunswick Fire Station, 1937

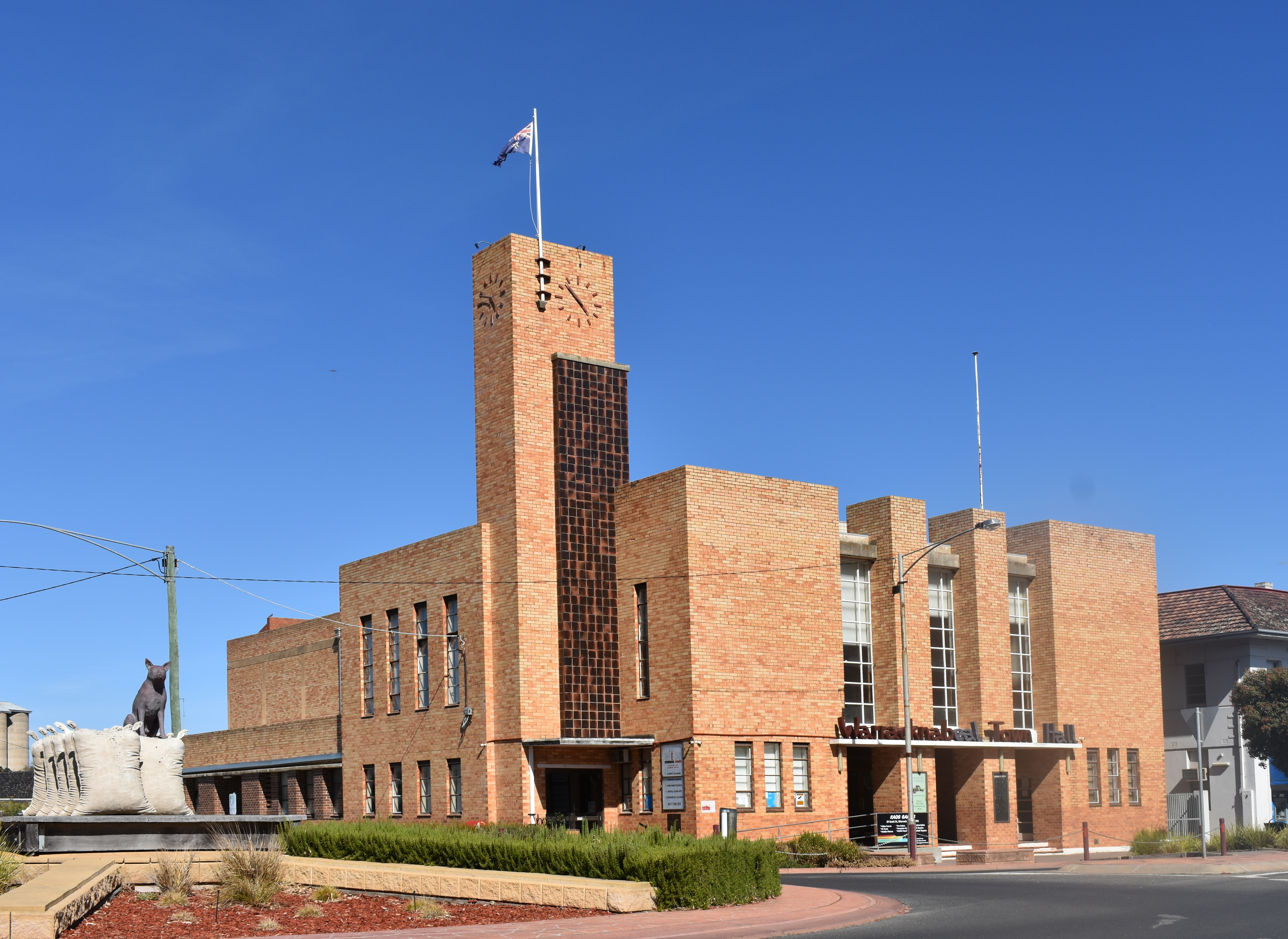
Warracknabeal Town Hall, 1940

Seabrook and Fildes was an Australian architecture practice in Melbourne, Victoria that played a significant role in the introduction of modernist architecture that first occurred in the 1930s. They are most well known for the Dutch modernist inspired Mac.Robertson Girls High School, designed by Norman Seabrook in 1933.

== Architectural Practice ==
As a young architect Norman Seabrook famously won the competition for the Mac.Robertson Girls' High school in 1933 soon after returning from travels through Europe, with a striking Dutch Modernist inspired design later hailed as a seminal element of what architect and critic Robin Boyd called the '1934 Revolution'. Seabrook took on the slightly older and more experienced Alan Fildes to execute the project, which became a formal partnership in 1936. By applying and adapting European modernist design principles to a broad range of civic, industrial, commercial and residential buildings, Seabrook and Fildes played a primary role in the dissemination of modernist architecture in Victoria in their relatively short-lived period of greatest creative output between 1934 and 1940.

Other notable projects included fire stations in Brunswick and Windsor, both also broadly inspired by Dutch Modernism, with rectangular volumes of brick and minimal decorative touches.

Other landmarks included Barnett's in Bourke Street, Melbourne, where the strip windows were separated by panels of blue-painted metal spandrels in imitation of curtain walling, and the Royal Exchange in Pitt Street, Sydney, with its large areas of glass, and rectilinear detailing (though the most distinctive feature of two floors of glass block walls have been replaced). Through a connection of Alan Fildes the firm was engaged on numerous projects that transformed the commercial streets of the Victorian country town of Hamilton, Victoria in the 1930s, with three pubs refurbishments and five new retail buildings, some in their signature rectilinear style, while others are more exuberant Art Deco, with prominent signage, curved corners and glass brick towers. One of their most outstanding projects was a new town hall for the small town of Warracknabeal in a boldy modernist composition of massive cream brick volumes, with integral clock tower and elegant signage.

An 8-storey office block for the Bank of New South Wales for 100 Collins Street, Melbourne was designed but never constructed. Designed in association with the larger firm of Godfrey & Spowers, it was a design with a rectilinear chequerboard effect, but also a vertical emphasis typical of Art Deco, on a traditionally solid base.

Though known as committed modernists, they were also capable of designing in other modes, and their villa 'Combe Martin' for industrialist Charles Ruwolt in Mornington is a fine example of the Old English revival style.

The practice operated as Seabrook, Fildes and Hunt briefly from 1955 until Fildes' death in 1956, then as Seabrook, Hunt and Dale until Norman Seabrook's retirement in 1976, but after WW2 the firm had lost their position as leading avant-garde designers.

== Personal life ==
Norman Hugh Seabrook was born in the Melbourne suburb of Northcote in 1906. He received his education at Brighton College, Wesley, and Hassets Commercial College Prahran, and gained his Architectural articles working for A.R. Barnes in 1924–26. He continued his studies at the University of Melbourne Architecture Atelier from 1927 to 1931, before working for 18 months in Britain and travelling in Europe, possibly gaining first-hand experiences of the Dutch Functionalists and working on projects influenced by them in Britain. On his return to Melbourne in 1933 he won the competition to design the new Mac.Robertson Girls' High school, which he completed with the assistance of Alan Fildes, with whom he entered into partnership in 1936. The partnership ended in 1956 with the death of Fildes. Seabrook taught briefly at the University of Melbourne in the 1950s, and continued practicing as Seabrook Hunt and Dale until his retirement in 1976. He died two years later in 1978.

Alan Fildes was born in the Melbourne suburb of Richmond in 1909. He studied modelling, architecture, construction and carpentry at Brighton Technical College. He received his certificate of architectural registration while working for Oakley and Parkes in 1933. By 1936 he had entered into practice with Norman Seabrook, Seabrook as the main designer, Fildes managing the projects and running the office. Alan Fildes died in 1956 at the age of 47.

Amongst the office staff of Seabrook & Fildes was Russian-born architect Anatol Kagan (1913-2009), who worked there in the late 1930s and later became a prominent practitioner in his own right.

== Notable projects ==
=== MacRobertson Girls' High school, 1934 ===
MacRobertson Girls' High school was constructed in 1933–34 to Norman Seabrook's competition-winning design. It remains one of the first and best examples of Modernist architecture in Melbourne and was said by Robin Boyd to have signalled ‘the 1934 revolution’ of Victorian architecture. Influenced by Dutch Architect Willem Marinus Dudok’s Hilversum City Hall, the school was arranged in a functionalist manner, breaking the program down into series of intersecting cream-brick volumes according to De Stijl principles, interrupted by large strips of red-framed windows and blue-glazed window sills. The building was a radical departure from school buildings of the time, even including a rooftop classroom, and was the first Willem Marinus Dudok inspired building designed by Seabrook, the principles of which would be repeated and adapted through much of the practices later work.

=== Stokes and Sons, 1936 ===
The factory for the silverware and medallion manufactures Stokes and Sons was constructed in Albert Street, Brunswick in 1936. It was a significant building for architects Seabrook and Fildes, as it saw them expand their Modernist design principles to successfully execute an industrial building type. Constructed in their signature cream-brick it broke down the traditional large factory into a series of volumes, each scaled according to its function, the largest for the manufacturing part of the complex and a lower volume for the office spaces. It also featured the bright colors used at MacRob, with window frames in bright vermillion, the soffits of the long ledges above in bright blue, with a bright yellow front door and lettering of the signage. The building is demolished.

=== Brunswick Fire Station, 1937 ===
Brunswick Fire Station was designed for the Metropolitan Fire Brigade in 1937, and remains in operation today. It is significant for its radical shift from the Georgian revival style common to fire stations of the time, replacing historical reference with a stripped-back modern functionalism. The red brick cubic composition of the Station was set apart from the domestic components, which were contained in two small blocks behind the main building, forming their own residential precinct and reflecting recent advances in European urban design.

=== Windsor Fire Station, 1940 ===
Windsor Fire Station was a departure from the intersecting forms of the practices earlier works, reducing the massing to a simple cream brick box form with a central symmetrical panel of strip windows and projecting balconies, cut short by a blade wall on one side. The design of Kew Fire Station in 1941 by Harry Winbush may have been influenced by the Seabrook & Fildes stations, since it has the two-tone brickwork of Brunswick, and the central panel form of Windsor. The building was demolished in 1994 to make way for a new fire station.

=== Warracknabeal Town Hall, 1940 ===
The largest civic building designed by Seabrook and Fildes was a town hall for the rural Victorian town of Warracknabeal.

The building is significant for its application of European modernist design principles to the town-hall building type, which until then had been dominated by classical references

The building is constructed from the practice's signature cream-brick and features an asymmetric composition of two large volumes with a large corner clock tower signalling the main entry. The front of the building is broken up by three vertical strips of deeply recessed windows, creating an interplay between solid and void and combined with the deep shadow over the entry suggest an adaptation of modernist design principles to an Australian climate. When built, it originally included an operational cinema to provide a social focus for the town and a means of paying for the building's construction.

== List of works ==
- MacRobertson Girls' High School buildings, 1934
- Seabrook House, 55 The Boulevard, Hawthorn, 1935
- Stokes and Sons, Albert Street, Brunswick, 1936 (demolished)
- Gair Manufacturing Co., 461 King Street, West Melbourne, 1936
- Bank of New South Wales, 856 Sydney Road, Moreland, 1936
- High Royd flats, 36 Robe Street, St Kilda
- Brunswick Fire Station and Flats, 24 Blyth Street, Brunswick, 1937
- Ansett Aircraft Hangar, Essendon Airport, 1937
- Royal Exchange Assurance, Pitt Street, Sydney, 1937
- Shops and flats, 923 High Street, Armadale
- Miller & Co. Store, 121 Gray Street, Hamilton, 1937
- Shop, 196 Gray Street, Hamilton, c1938
- The George Hotel (extensive alterations; later an Edwardian verandah was added, demolished c2016), 205-221 Gray St Hamilton, 1938
- Grand Central Hotel (remodelling of former Caledonian),141-3 Gray St, Hamilton, 1938
- Victoria Hotel, 91-95 Thompson Street, c1938 (attribution on stylistic grounds)
- Laidlaw's, 119-123 Gray Street, Hamilton, c1939
- Uren's Pharmacy, 90 Gray Street, Hamilton, 1940
- Williams Building, 91-95 Gray St Hamilton, 1940
- Park Court Flats, 473 St Kilda Street, Elwood, 1938
- House, Duncombe Avenue, Brighton, 1936 (demolished)
- Barnett's Building, 164 Bourke Street, Melbourne, 1938
- Flat roofed house, Beaumaris, 1939 (demolished)
- Windsor Fire Station, 166 Albert Street, Windsor, 1940 (demolished)
- Warracknabeal Town Hall, 39 Scott Street, Warracknabeal, 1940
- Camberwell Fire Station, 575 Camberwell Road, Camberwell, c1940
- House, 6 Peterleigh Grove, Essendon, 1940
- Combe Martin, 819-820 Esplanade, Mornington, 1940
- Seabrook House, Croydon, 1941 (demolished)
- House, 355 Gray Street, Hamilton, 1941
- House, 13 Carmichael Street Hamilton, 1950

== Gallery ==
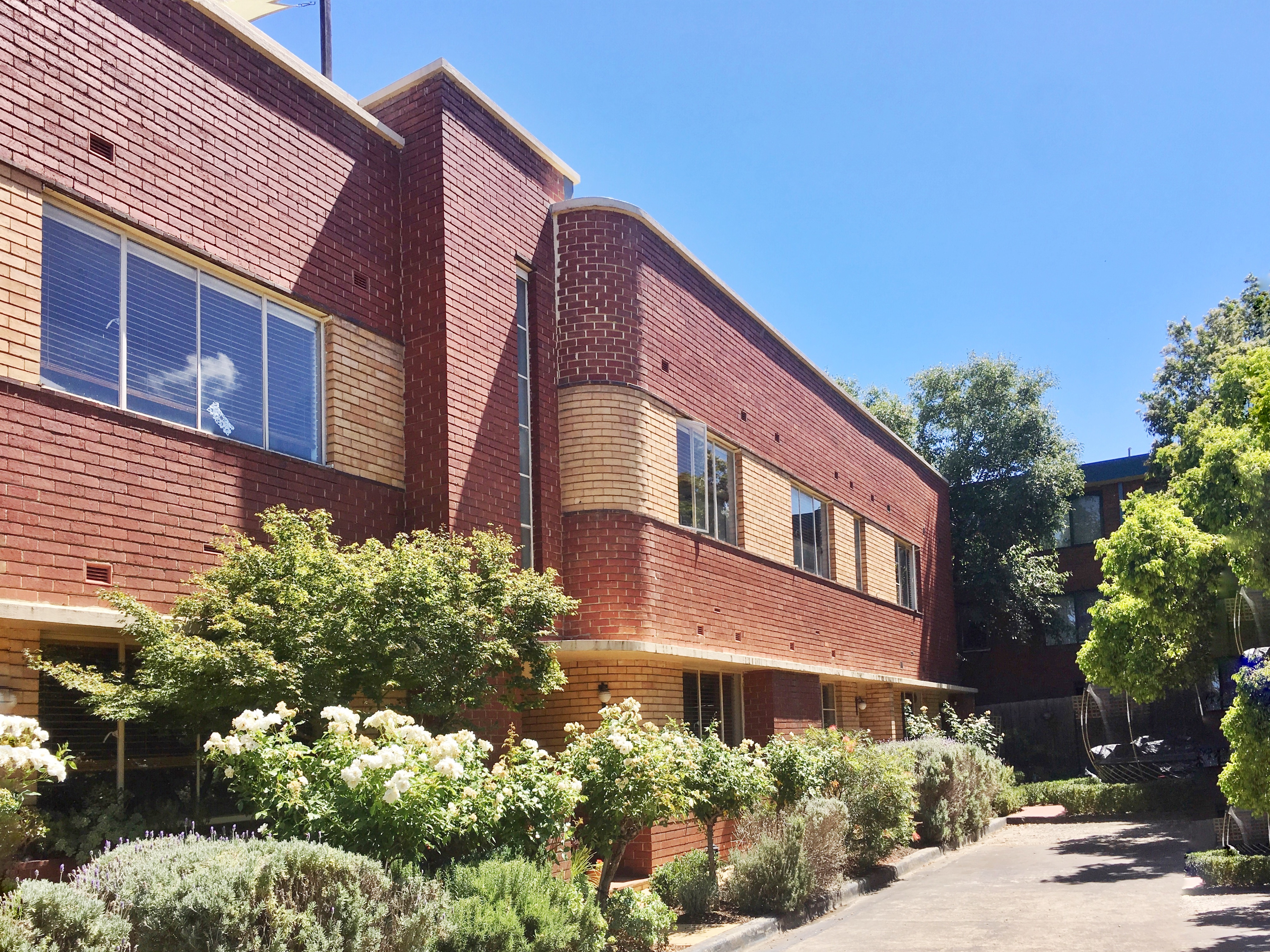
Brunswick Fire Station Flats 1937

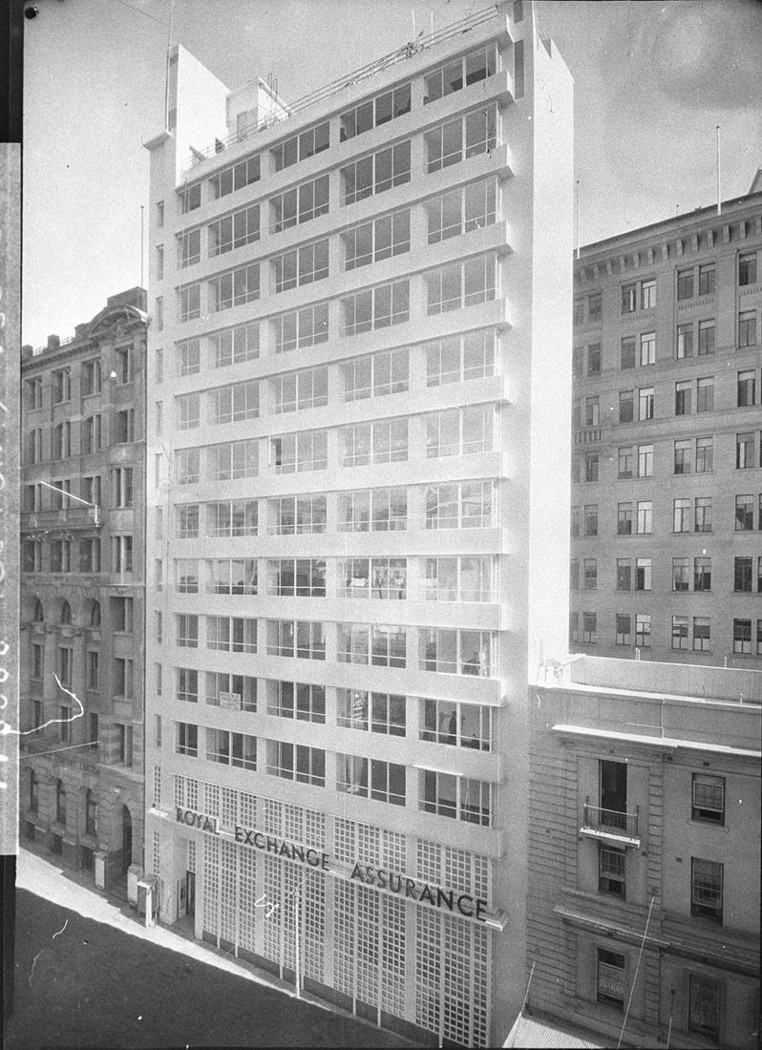
Royal Exchange Assurance building, Sydney, 1937

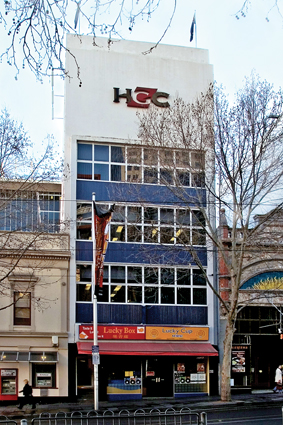
Barnett's, Bourke Street, 1938

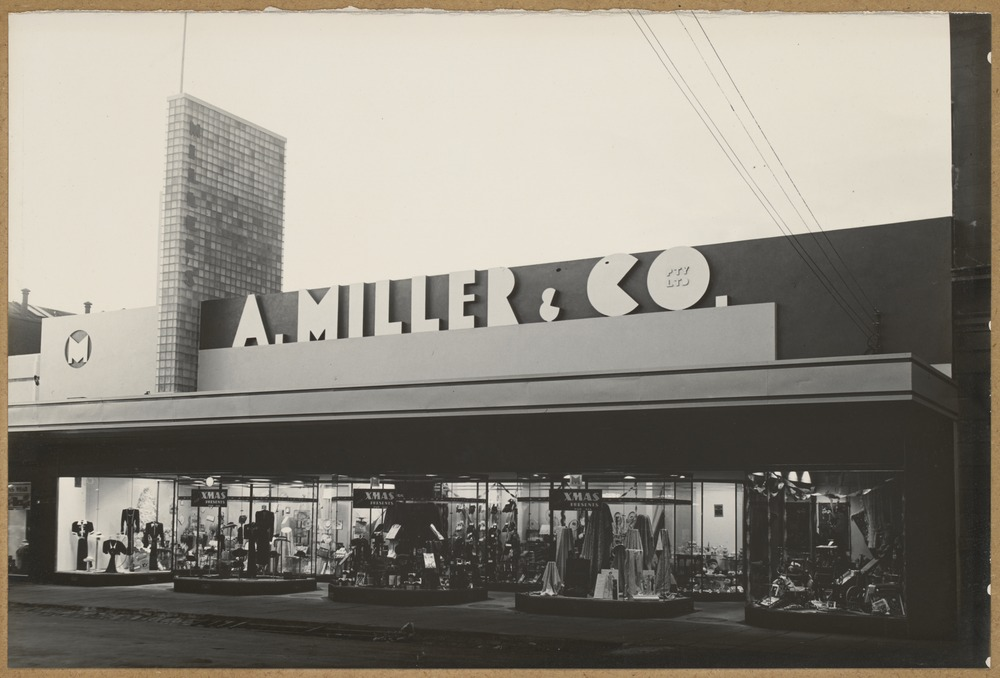
Miller & Co, Hamilton, c1937
