= MacRobertson Girls' High School buildings =

MacRobertson Girls’ High School buildings
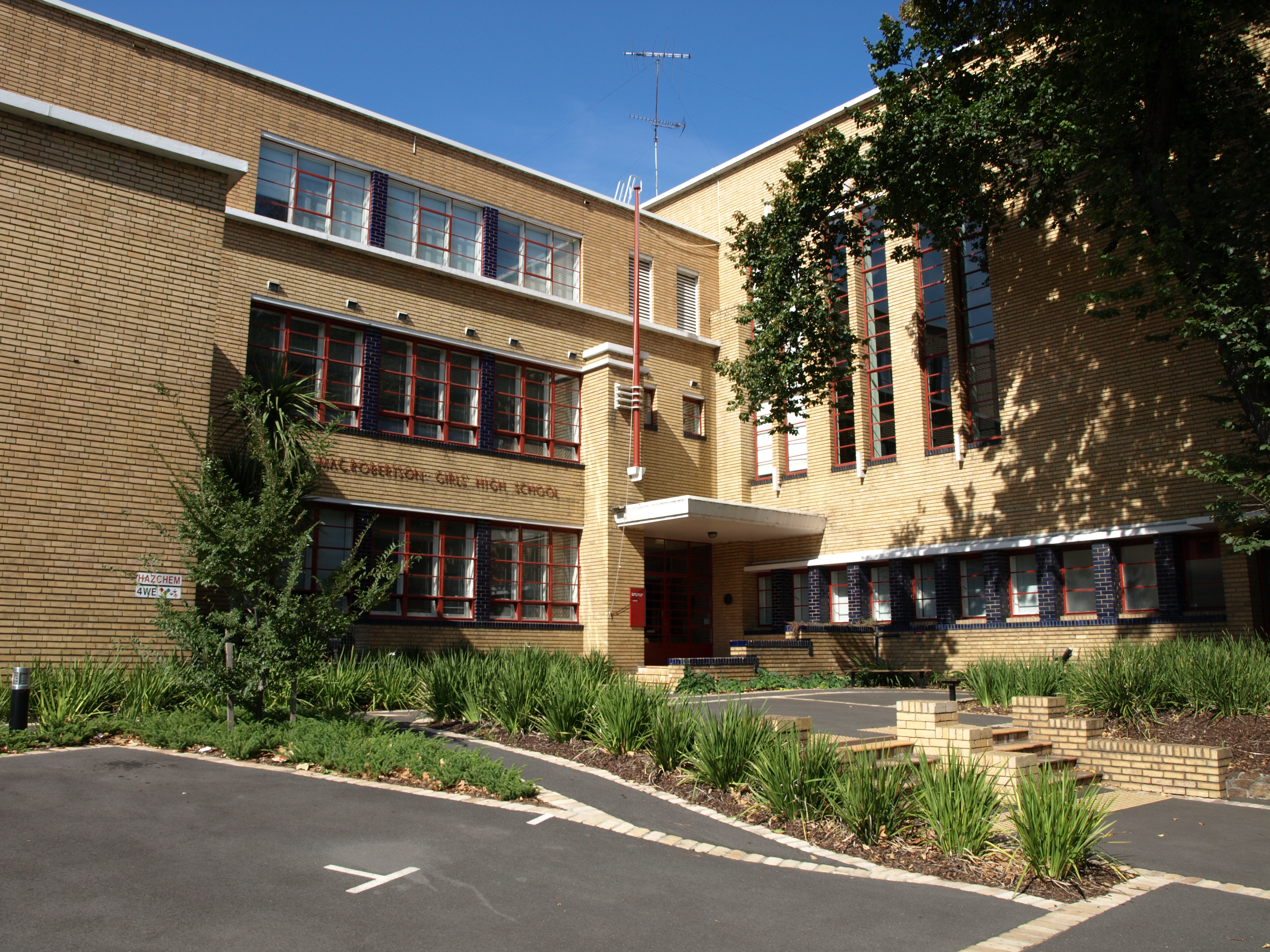
- MacRobertson Girls' High School main entry

- Location in greater metropolitan Melbourne
- Interactive map of MacRobertson Girls’ High School buildings
- 37°50′10″S 144°58′20″E
- Type: State secondary school campus
- Etymology: Sir Michael Macpherson Robertson
- Location: 350–370 Kings Way, Albert Park, South Melbourne, Victoria, Australia

History
- Founder: Sir Michael Macpherson Robertson
- Built: 1934; 92 years ago

Site notes
- Architect: Norman Seabrook of Seabrook and Fildes
- Architectural style: Inter-war Functionalist & Moderne
- Owner: Victorian Department of Education
- Website: www.macrob.vic.edu.au

Victorian Heritage Register
- Official name: MacRobertson Girls' High School
- Type: Built
- Criteria: Architectural, historic and social significance
- Designated: 23 May 1998
- Reference no.: 2961

The MacRobertson Girls’ High School buildings are a series of heritage-listed buildings constructed on the site of the Mac.Robertson Girls' High School, located on the Kings Way, in Albert Park, South Melbourne, Victoria, Australia. The girls' school and the campus is named in honour of Sir Michael Macpherson Robertson after MacRobertson donated $100,000 to the State of Victoria, $40,000 of which was spent to construct the school. Norman Seabrook of Seabrook and Fildes architecture practice, designed the building after winning the state-wide design competition with his functional and modern design entry in the Inter-war Functionalist & Moderne style. Constructed in 1934 during centenary celebrations of Victoria, MacRobertson was vital to the progress of modernist architecture in Australia and essential in the strong re-emergence of the state after the economic downturn of the depression.

The building was listed on the Victorian Heritage Register on 23 May 1998 due to the buildings' architectural, historic and social significance to the State of Victoria.

== Description ==
The school was zoned in a functional manner with four wings for different disciplines including classrooms, science rooms, art rooms, and cookery rooms. This allowed for smooth movement between disciplines and also created distinct external courtyard areas around the building.

The facade of the building comprises "interlocking cubic forms of differing heights" which is offset by the vertical clock tower with white rendered vertical strips. The material Seabrook used were functional while at the same time embracing the typical palette of De Stijl movement by using striking colours of cream brick, red steel framed hopper windows and dark blue glazed brick piers between windows. Internally softer shades of red, blue, yellow, green and black were used. With the use of practical floor finish material such as linoleum for classrooms, terracotta tiles for corridors and granolithic materials for the stairs and services rooms.

=== Key influences ===
It is believed that the main influence of Seabrook's design for MacRobertson Girls’ High School was William Dudok Hilversum’s town hall (1923–31). Both these buildings have similar brickwork, rectilinear interlocking facades, functional planning, open air classrooms, flat roof, industrial aesthetic and a modern interior fitout.

The brickwork used in both consists of two stretchers followed by a header in a Flemish bond with an extra wide and deeply raked horizontal joint which emphasises horizontality, while the cream brickwork emphasised shadows. Seabrook selected local Glen Iris Cream bricks at a time when they were only being used sparingly in buildings such as in polychromatic brickwork. Using the cream brick for the entirety of the building was seen as a modernist approach and set a trend for many future buildings in Victoria.

=== Design approach ===
Seabrook had a strong functional design approach to the design of MacRobertson Girls’ High School. He believed that a "building must look like what it is, be it a town hall or a destructor plan…" . This frame of mind helped in creating the unique and functional design of the building which has had a great impact on Australian architecture. It was the first modernist school constructed in Victoria, at a time when other contemporary schools tended to adopt a variety of Gothic collegiate to Georgian revival style in the design. Robin Boyd described the building as an "evolution of modern architecture" in Australia.

The differing masses of MacRobertson impart proportion and scale to the building, while the De Stijl colour of the articulated red steel hopper windows contrast to the blue glazed brick piers and cream brickwork, helping to break up the facade. Steel windows were not common in schools at this time and are seen as a modernist and functional approach.

Seabrook also considered the site in his design, using native plants to embrace the dry, flat scrubland of South Melbourne. The flagpole and clock tower are also significant in his design and can be seen in many of Seabrook's later work.

== Gallery ==
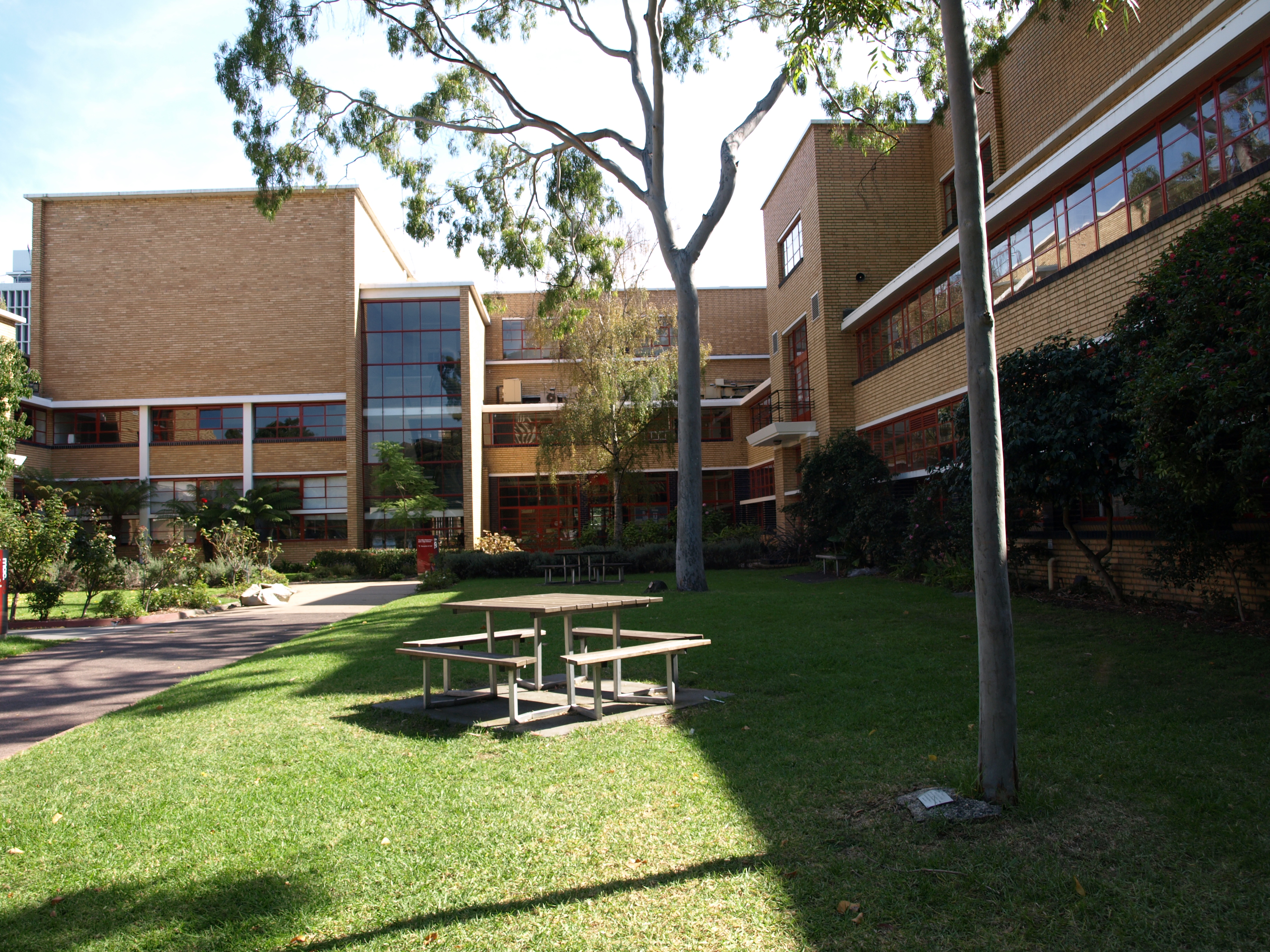
MacRobertson Girls' High School's courtyard

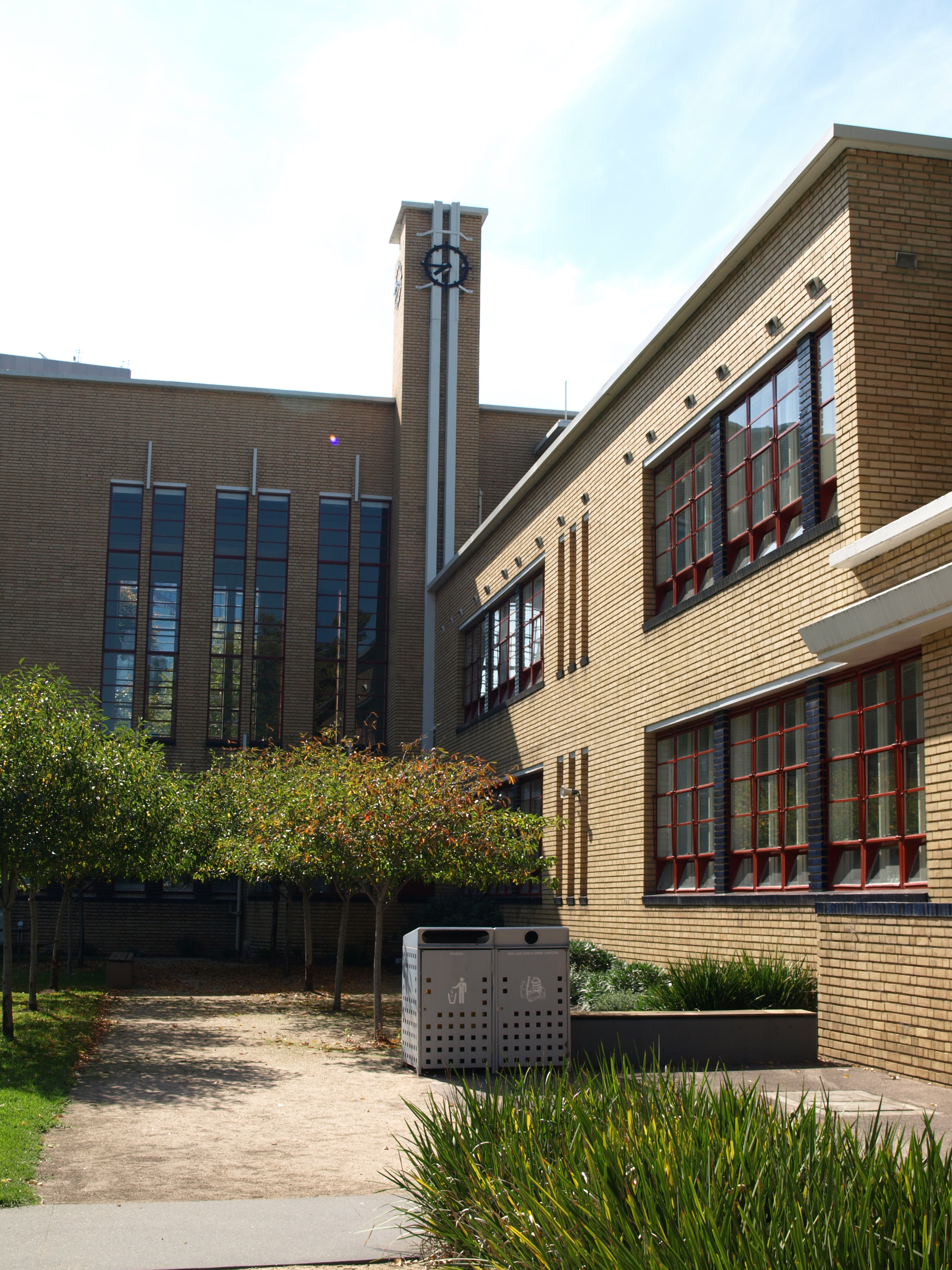
The School's characteristic clock tower with two white rendered vertical strips

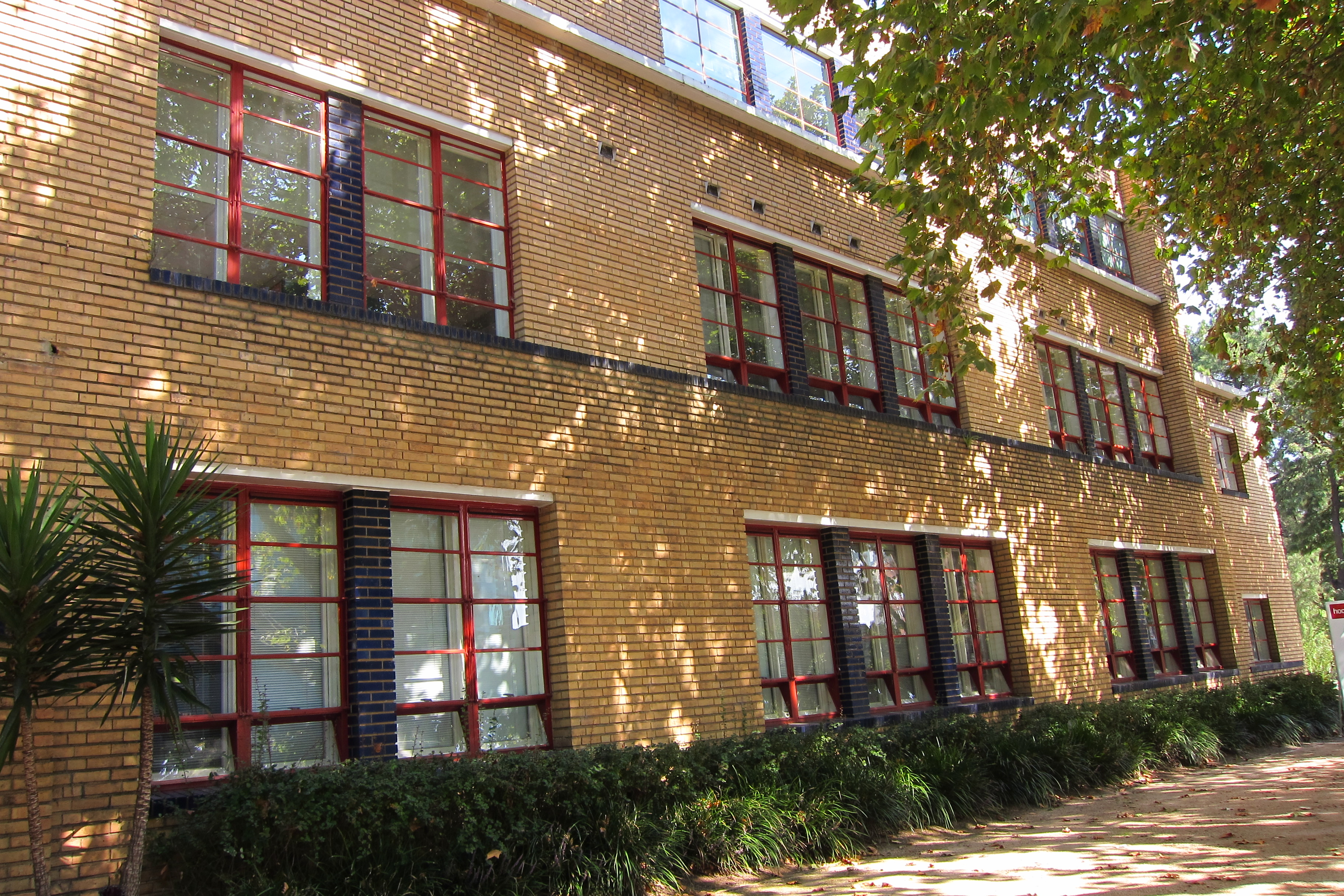
Red hopper windows with blue tiled piers in between

== See also ==
- Architecture of Melbourne
- Mac.Robertson Girls' High School
- Australian non-residential architectural styles
