= Wyuna =

Australian ship

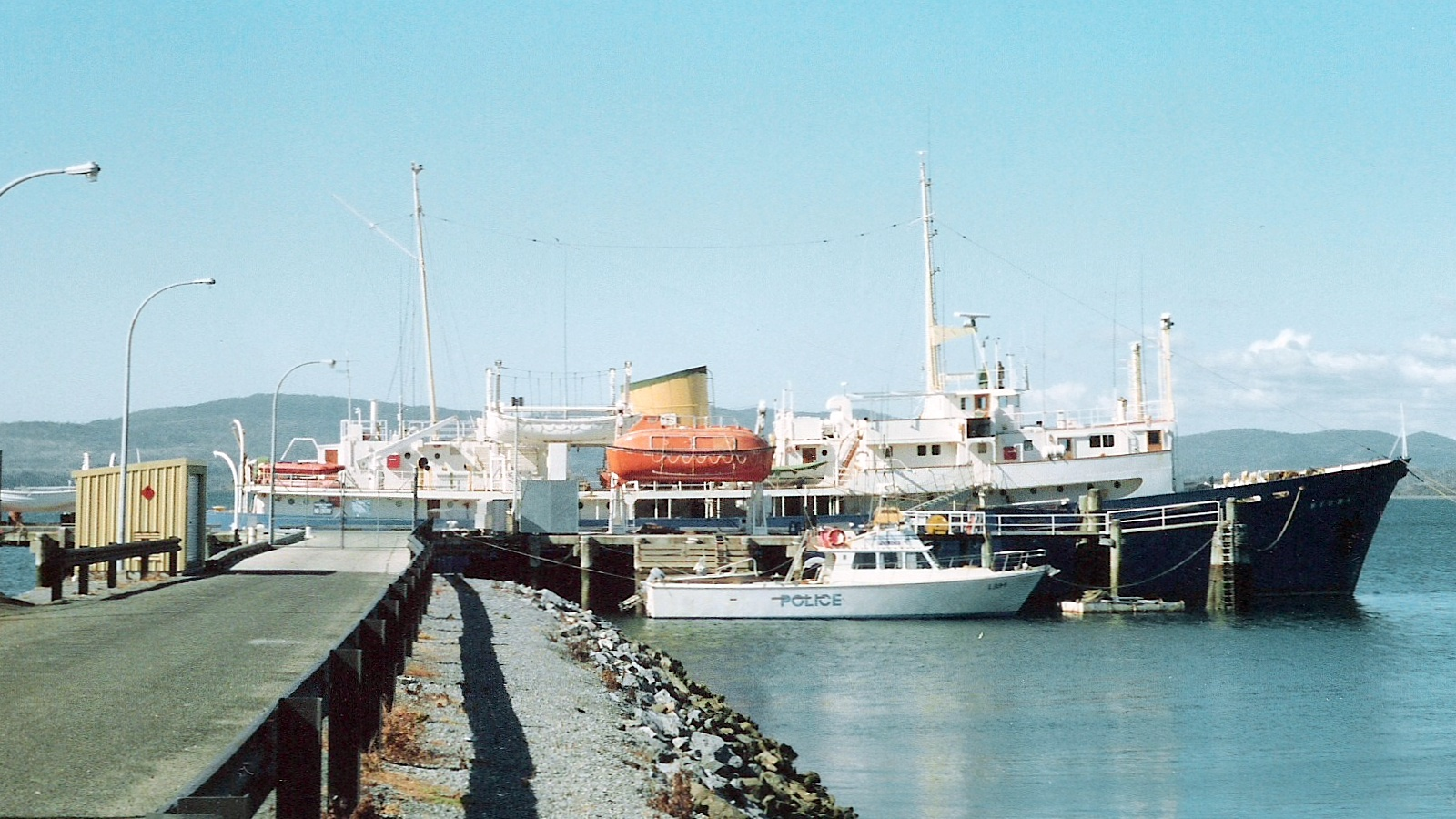
- Wyuna at Beauty Point, Tasmania

History

Australia
- Name: Wyuna
- Owner: Port Philip Sea Pilots (1953–1979); Australian Maritime College (1979–2004); Mineralogy Pty Ltd of Brisbane (2004); Classic Wyuna Ltd (2006); (2013–Present); Western Port Oberon Association Inc
- Port of registry: Melbourne
- Builder: Ferguson Shipbuilders, Glasgow, Scotland
- Launched: 16 April 1953
- Identification: IMO number: 5393907
- Status: Museum ship
- Notes: Architect: Charles Stewart Mackinnon

General characteristics
- Type: Pilot Tender
- Tonnage: 1304 GRT
- Length: 63.58m
- Beam: 11.91m
- Draught: 4.57m
- Propulsion: 3 × English Electric 380 kW diesel generators; 400 Vdc connected to 2 electric motors each 700shp

Wyuna is a former Port Phillip Pilot tender and Australian Maritime College training vessel.

== History ==
The ship was built in 1953 by Ferguson Shipbuilders of Port Glasgow, Scotland for the Port Phillip Sea Pilots organisation as a pilot cutter. She is propelled by a diesel-electric power plant consisting of diesel generators powering electric motors coupled to the propeller shafts. Consequently, she may use the ship prefix "de" and be referred to as de Wyuna. Her role as a pilot cutter was to sail with pilots on board to meet ships entering Port Phillip Bay. Pilots would be transferred by the Wyuna's workboat to the vessel requiring pilotage while it was stopped dead in the water, with shelter provided by the vessel itself. In the early 1970s the pilot service started using fast launches to allow pilots to board while ships were still underway, and in 1979 the Wyuna was sold to the Australian Maritime College in Launceston, Tasmania as a training vessel. She continued in that role until 2004 when sold to Mineralogy Pty Ltd as an accommodation vessel. In September 2013 she was donated to the Western Port Oberon Association for the Victorian Maritime Centre currently at Crib Point.

For a time she was docked at Beauty Point, Tasmania, and after being refurbished for 18 months she was to be moved to Docklands in Melbourne, Victoria. After this berth became unavailable the vessel was docked at Inspection Head Wharf in Beauty Point. After a period there it was towed into Bell Bay where she lays at anchor as of January 2016.

When funding becomes available the Western Port Oberon Association has plans to display the vessel in a wet berth alongside the former Royal Australian Navy Oberon-class submarine HMAS Otama.
