= Somers, Victoria =

Somers
- Town
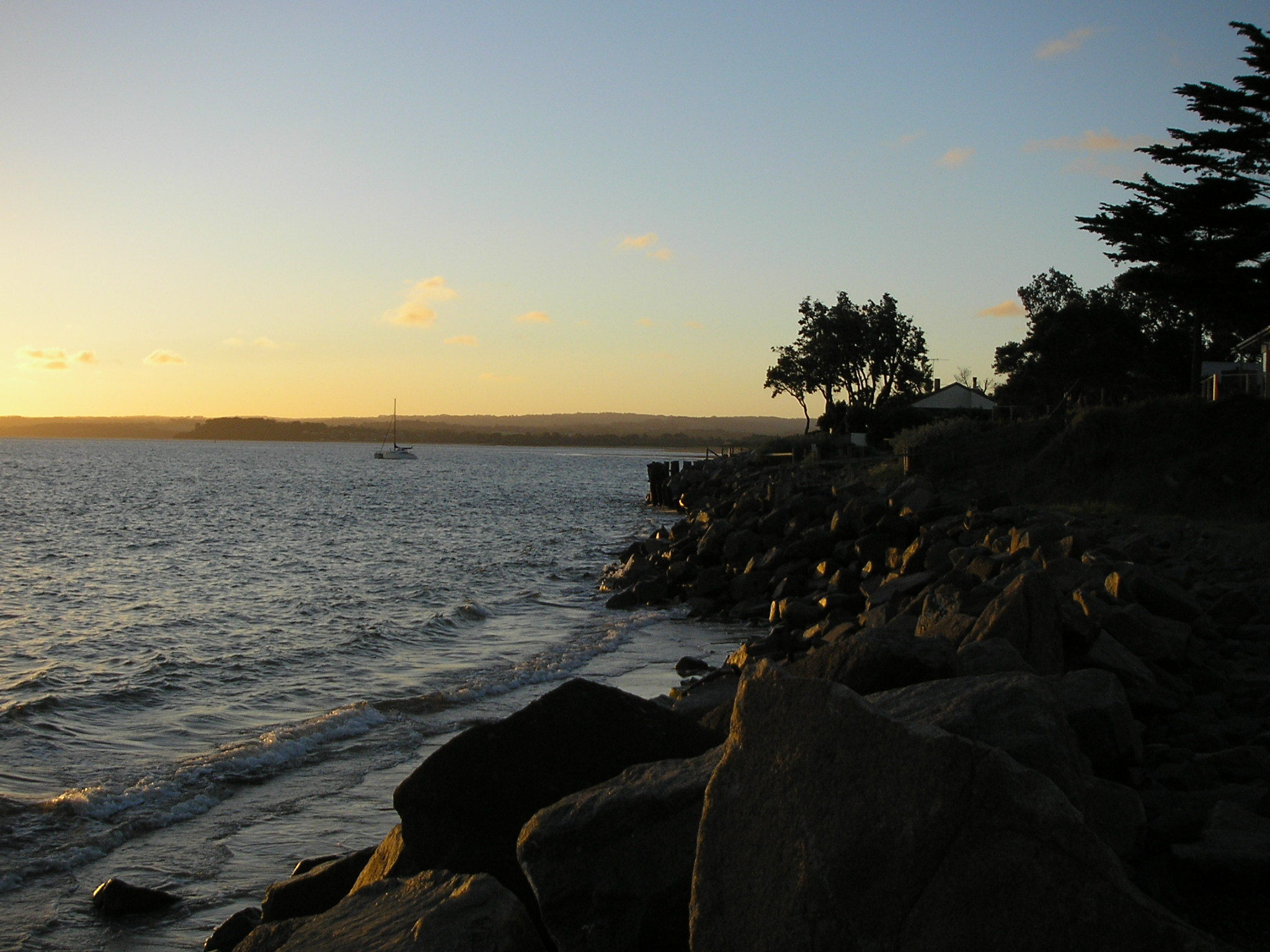
- Sunset at Somers

- Interactive map of Somers
- Coordinates: 38.393°S 145.163°E
- Country: Australia
- State: Victoria
- LGA: Shire of Mornington Peninsula
- Location: 90 km (56 mi) from Melbourne; 12 km (7.5 mi) from Hastings
- Established: 1925

Government
  - State electorate: Nepean
  - Federal division: Flinders

Area
  - Total: 6 km^{2} (2.3 sq mi)

Population
  - Total: 1,857 (2021 census)
  - Density: 310/km^{2} (800/sq mi)
- Postcode: 3927
Localities around Somers
Balnarring	Bittern	HMAS Cerberus
Balnarring Beach	Somers	HMAS Cerberus
Western Port	Western Port	Western Port

Somers is a town on the Mornington Peninsula in Melbourne, Victoria, Australia, 67 km (42 mi) south-east of Melbourne's Central Business District, located within the Shire of Mornington Peninsula local government area. Somers recorded a population of 1,857 at the 2021 census.

Somers is located in the south-eastern corner of the Mornington Peninsula, on the shores of Western Port.

== History ==
Originally known as Balnarring East, the town was renamed in 1930, in honour of The 6th Baron Somers, the Governor of Victoria, who founded the local Lord Somers Camp. The subdivision of Somers began in 1925, whilst the Boulevard Cafe & Post Office commenced business in 1927, the address then still being Balnarring East. After much correspondence with the Education Dept. the Palm Beach School No. 4458 opened 1929. Despite a few very small land subdivisions for housing, Somers has not seen any major development since the 1920s and has retained much of its remnant bush land on the foreshore. Initially as the land had been used for grazing, the estates were bare until local residents led by local store-keeper Ron Stone planted many trees throughout the area.

=== Heritage listings ===
The following places in Somers are listed on the Victorian Heritage Register:

- Coolart estate, 36–40 Lord Somers Road
- Lord Somers Camp, 150 Lord Somers Road

== Geography ==
Somers lies on an area of land on the south-eastern point of the Mornington Peninsula, where to the south, it borders Western Port. The town of Cowes on Phillip Island can be seen from any beach in Somers in most weather conditions. There are two large sandbars between Somers and Phillip Island, and between them is a deep shipping channel. At low tide both sandbars are often visible. To the north, inland, lies extensively cleared lands used for agriculture. Further north lie the towns of Bittern and Hastings which host many commercial services used by Somers residents. To the east is the suburb and military base, HMAS Cerberus. Its compound bordering Somers is entirely bushland and used for training exercises. Where the base meets Somers at its coastline, beaches are closed and the land consists mainly of bushy coastal forests. To the west, separated from the Lord Somers Camp and the Coolart Wetlands, lies the locality of Balnarring. Somers' geography slopes gently down towards the water's edge, interrupting line of sight to Mt. Dandenong and as a result, television reception can be difficult when using a small antenna. Local knowledge is advisable for good reception.

== Recreation ==
Somers is perhaps best known for its yacht club and sailing facilities. The waters offshore from Somers, neighbouring Balnarring and Merricks Beaches, Flinders and Shoreham, and the body of water between the Mornington Peninsula and Philip Island are some of the most ideal and safest regions for sailing of all types in Australia. On most days many sailboats, mainly catamarans, can be seen in the waters of Western Port Bay participating in several races that are held during good sailing conditions, usually on weekends. The tidal inlet of Merricks Creek at low tide is one of the best places around Melbourne and the Mornington Peninsula for skiffle boarding, while the South Beach (actually to the east of the main beach) is tucked away behind the belt of foreshore bushland that is Somers Foreshore Reserve, and is enjoyed mainly by local residents, while the main beach, Somers Beach, is home to one of the major yacht clubs in Western Port, Somers Yacht Club. Walking is also popular in Somers as good quality sealed and unsealed pathways exist along roadsides and in parklands, where walkers enjoy native bush land, wildlife and views of Western Port.

=== Beaches ===
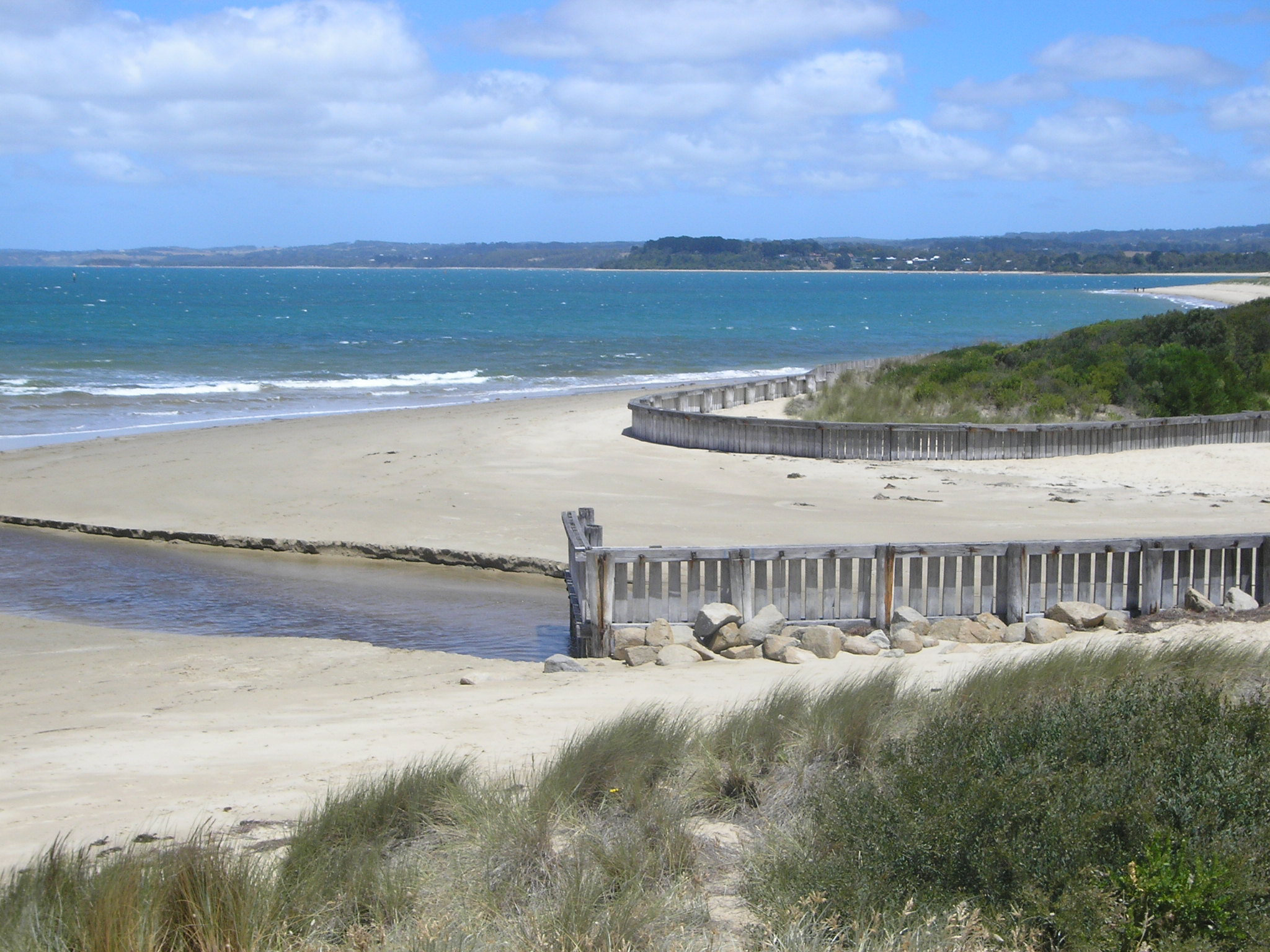
Tidal Flats of Merricks Creek Inlet

The coastline of Somers has three distinguishable beaches, South Beach, Somers Beach and the tidal flats of Merricks Creek Inlet.

At certain times of the year these beaches can be covered with dried seaweed from the extensive marine vegetation under the waters of Western Port, however when the seaweed is not in season, all of Somers beaches boast clean sand. The South Beach has an intricate system of rock pools, this is both of great interest to beachcombers, and something of a curse, as the beach is a difficult place to swim. The Merricks Creek Inlet is a tidal creek that flows with the tides of Western Port. About 50 cm below the surface of the sandbed of the creek lies a darker sand that gives off a hydrogen sulphide smell when disturbed. Sand all these beaches is generally fine grain mixed with crushed sea shells. Small reefs exist in a few places and can be seen at low tide, but these are only rocky reefs incapable of supporting coral. At low tide these reefs can make navigation near the beach difficult for watercraft and are clearly marked with buoys. A succession of big storm tides came in on 24 March, 25 March, 22 April, 23 April and 15 June 2011, severely eroding the sand dunes east the Merricks Creek. In 2012, the wooden wall that had fixed that path of the Merricks Creek since 1974, was taken down, as it was deemed unsafe and not adequately performing its job anymore. Starting in July 2012 and finishing in September 2012, a new rock wall was built, to fix the creek on a path straight into Westernport. For the three and a half years the wall has been in place, a noticeable buildup of sand has occurred east of the wall, while considerable erosion has occurred west of the wall. In November 2015, the entrance to the Merricks Creek was filled in with a sand groyne, as a short-term solution to the constant hydrogen sulphide odour caused by the breakdown of sea grasses within the creek. As of June 2016, the sand groyne is still in place, and as such the surrounding beaches have benefitted with the buildup of sand.

=== Erosion ===
Somers has an interesting history revolving around its Main Beach. Erosion of the beaches around Somers, particularly around the Yacht Club has been a major concern for foreshore communities and residents of Parklands Avenue and The Promenade over the last few decades. Several decades ago, Somers Yacht Club was situated next to the beach with a depression (where once the Merricks Creek flowed separating it from the sands of the beach of Westernport Bay. Yachts and sailboats were wheeled and carried over many sand dunes to reach the sandy beaches to launch them to sail.

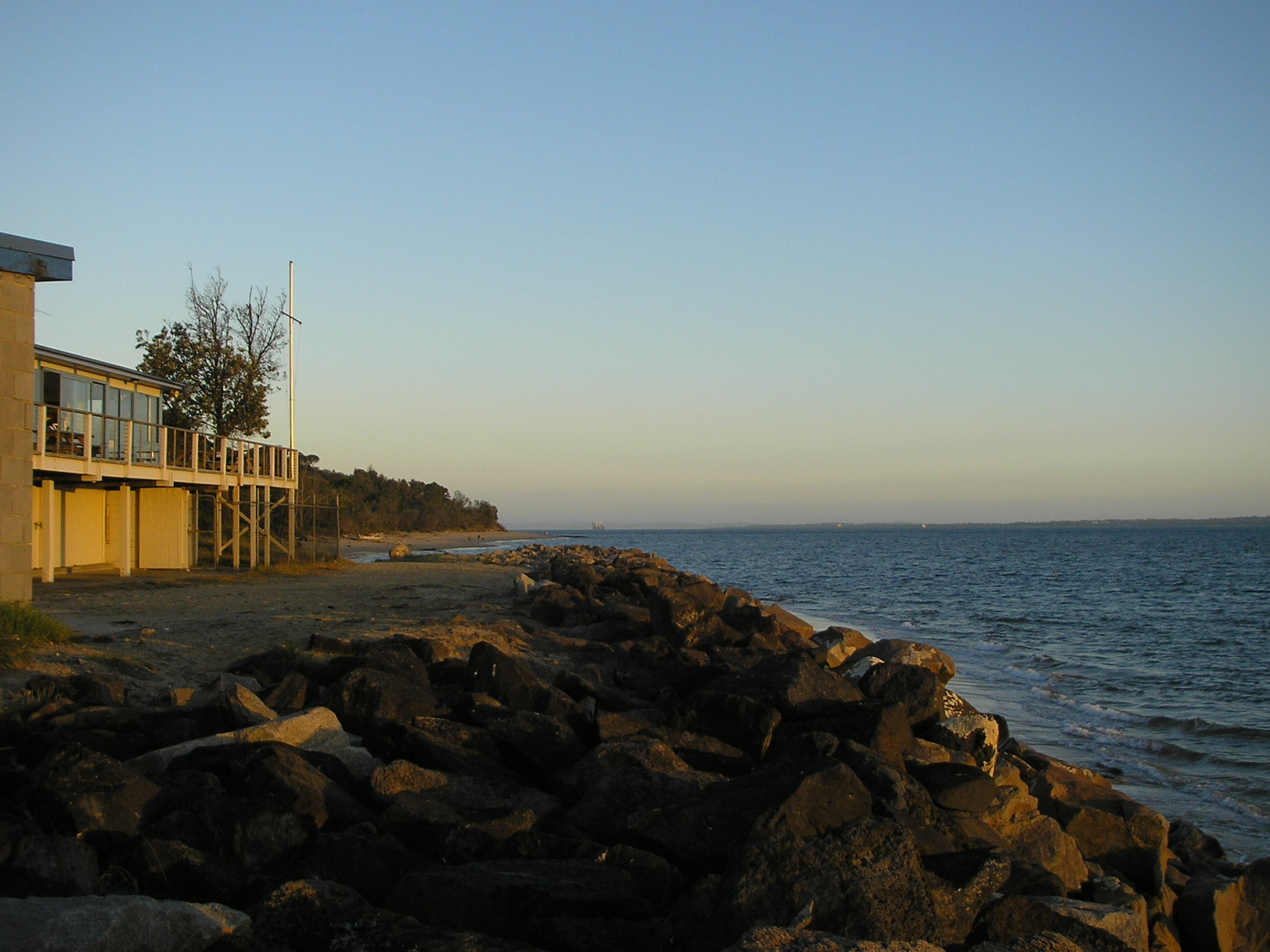
Rock Seawall protecting Somers Yacht Club on Somers Beach.

Yet today, the Yacht Club boasts Seaside views and in 2001 had its roof blown off and severely damaged in a large storm after decades of erosion drew a new coastline almost to the doorstep of the Yacht Club. Seawalls constructed of natural rocks have been strategically placed around the coastline of Somers Beach complemented by wooden seawalls and many small wave-breaks that have all slowly succumbed to the waves of the sea. Experts such as marine geomorphologists have assessed the erosion situation, however no definitive explanation can be found as to why the erosion occurs. The most popular theory is that of Longshore Drift, where successive "waves" of sand pass Somers, with sand build up when such a wave passes, and erosion at other times. A commonly held view is that the man-made channelisation of Merricks Creek has upset the delicate equilibrium of the coastline. In recent years the erosion has slowed and almost stopped, and experts predict it could be due to a major decrease in easterly winds, tending to slow the effects of longshore drift, thus the erosion. An alternative view is that the decrease in rainfall has limited the period when Merricks Creek is flowing into the sea, thus allowing sand build up at the mouth of the creek, which then allows the sand build up to propagate along the beach. Between 2011 and 2015, the beaches of Somers have lost a considerable amount of dunage and sand, seen most evidently west of the Wits End Creek and west of Merricks Creek. These areas have lost up to as much as six to eight metres of dunes in a five-year period. As recently as May 2015, the beach west of Merricks Creek lost three metres of dunes in as little as three days, caused by gale-force winds, large swell and king tides.

== Community ==
Somers has a Primary School, a Kindergarten,a caravan park, a General Store ("The Somers General"),a CFA (Country Fire Authority) Fire Station, tennis courts, a cricket ground, The Coolart Wetlands, Lord Somers Camp, the Education Department School Camp (originally built for the RAAF, then used to accommodate immigrants) and various parks, gardens and reserves. There are no shopping strips or centres and no supermarkets. The newly refurbished General Store and cafe has become very popular with both local residents and visitors as a pleasant meeting /social venue for a meal or coffee. It also carries sufficient groceries etc. so that it is almost possible not to have to travel to nearby Balnarring or Hastings for food. However, if other forms of commercial service are required, Balnarring and Hastings are usually the main places to go.

Somers is also home to The Somers Yacht Club which houses a Sea Rescue Facility, who contribute greatly to the safety of Western Port Bay through the use of rescue boats sent out to help capsized skippers and crew, or those in other forms of trouble, whilst the Yacht Club is open.

== Environment ==
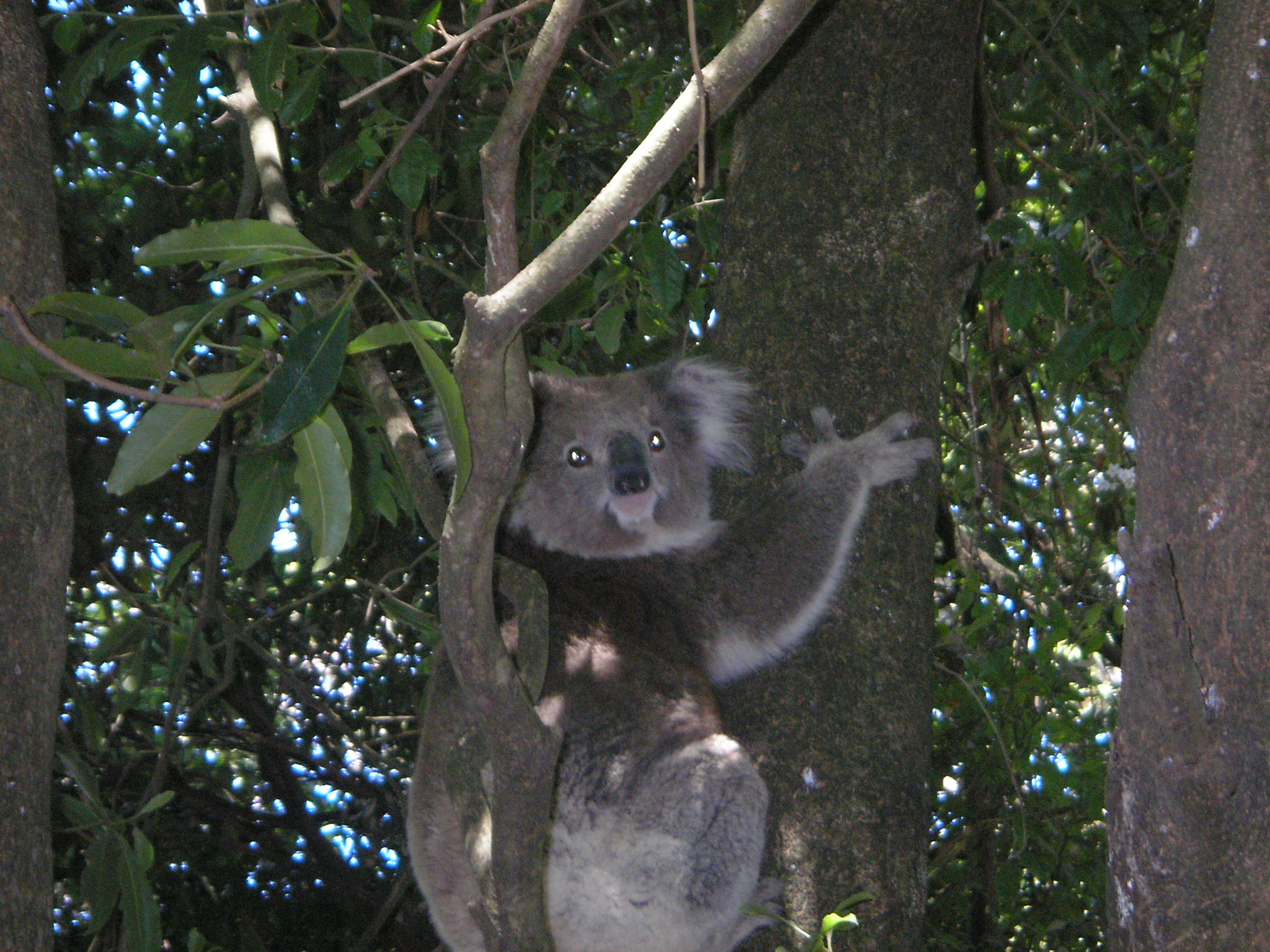
Koala in the Somers Caravan Park.

It is not unusual in Somers to see some (introduced) koalas and the suburb is well known for its Koala Walk. The distinctive growl of Koalas can often be heard in the town. Travellers are advised to take care, as koalas frequently cross local roads, and show little road sense. Occasionally echidnas have been seen in the area around The Promenade. Bushy-tail and ring- tail Possums are commonplace, and can often be seen soon after nightfall, scurrying along powerlines and thus silhouetted against the night sky.

Parks, Gardens and Reserves in Somers:

- Coolart Wetlands and Homestead
- Merricks Creek Foreshore Reserve
- Lord Somers Camp Playing Field
- Koala Reserve
- R.W. Stone Reserve
- Somers Foreshore Reserve
- Garden and Banksia Squares

== See also ==
- Shire of Hastings – Somers was previously within this former local government area.
- List of Melbourne suburbs
- Mornington Peninsula
- Phillip Island
- Western Port
- Longshore Drift
