= Bittern, Victoria =

Bittern
- Town
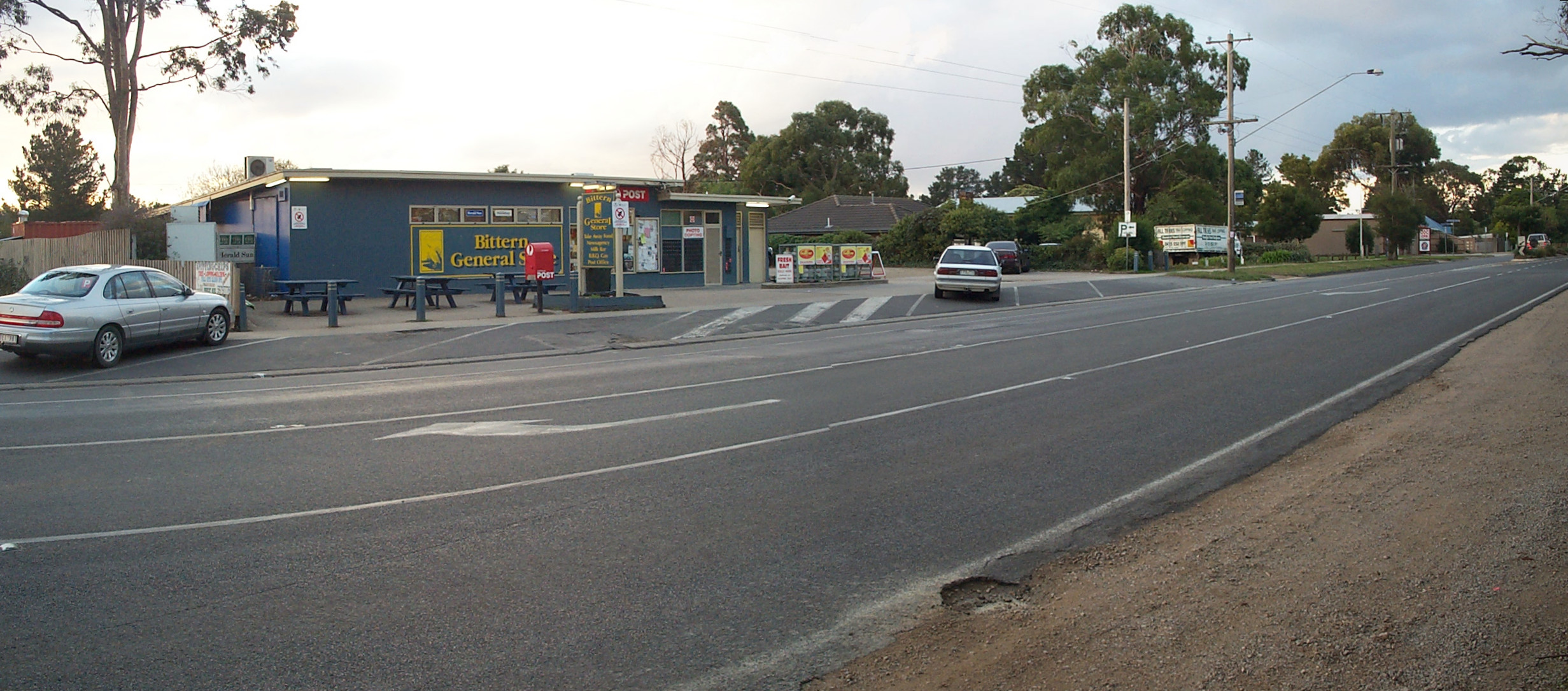
- Bittern General Store

- Interactive map of Bittern
- Coordinates: 38.33858260041506°S 145.17630236521327°E
- Country: Australia
- State: Victoria
- LGA: Shire of Mornington Peninsula
- Location: 82 km (51 mi) from Melbourne; 5 km (3.1 mi) from Hastings

Government
  - State electorate: Hastings
  - Federal division: Flinders

Area
  - Total: 35.6 km^{2} (13.7 sq mi)

Population
  - Total: 4,276 (2021 census)
  - Density: 120.11/km^{2} (311.1/sq mi)
- Postcode: 3918
Localities around Bittern
Tuerong	Hastings	Western Port
Balnarring	Bittern	Western Port
Somers	HMAS Cerberus	Crib Point

Bittern is a town on the Mornington Peninsula in Melbourne, Victoria, Australia, 61 km (38 mi) south-east of Melbourne's Central Business District, located within the Shire of Mornington Peninsula local government area. Bittern recorded a population of 4,276 at the 2021 census.

Bittern is part of an urban enclave on Western Port comprising Bittern, Hastings, Crib Point, Somerville, and Tyabb.

Bittern is named after the shy wetland bird, the Australasian bittern, which reflects the town's location amongst significant areas of native bushland and dense coastal vegetation.

== History ==
The town was part of the Coolart pastoral run of the 1860s. Bittern Post Office opened on 5 January 1891. The railway opened for Bittern in 1889 and small scale commercial development began during the early 1900s.

== Notable buildings ==
The town has a primary school, Bittern Primary School, and a small basketball and netball stadium known as Graham Myers Sports Stadium or Bittern Memorial Stadium, which features an indoor court used for basketball, netball or floorball and four outside courts used for netball. There is also a small oval located outside the stadium.

== Transport ==
Bittern is served by Bittern railway station on the Stony Point line and by the 782 bus route operated by Ventura Bus Lines between Frankston and Flinders.

== See also ==
- Shire of Hastings – Bittern was previously within this former local government area.
