= HMAS Otama =

Former RAN Oberon-class submarine

Coordinates: 38.341776°S 145.224100°E

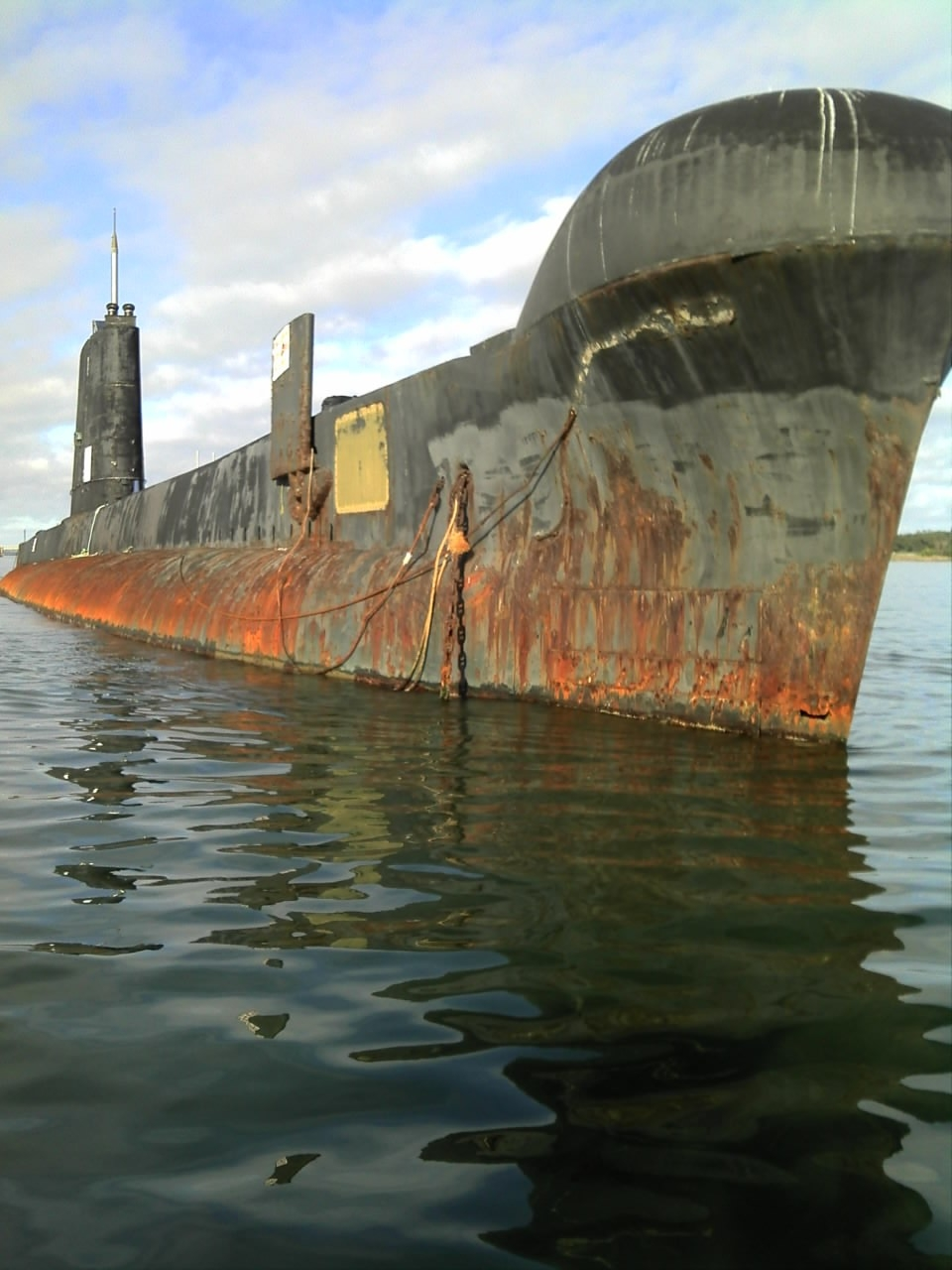
- Otama in Western Port in June 2011

History

Australia
- Builder: Scotts Shipbuilding & Engineering Company
- Laid down: 25 May 1973
- Launched: 3 December 1975
- Commissioned: 27 April 1978
- Decommissioned: 15 December 2000
- Motto: "Unseen We Seek"
- Nickname(s): One of the "Mystery Boats"; The "Gucci Boat"
- Status: Scrapped 2022

General characteristics
- Class & type: Oberon-class submarine
- Displacement: 1,610 tons standard; 2,030 tons surfaced; 2,410 tons submerged
- Length: 295.2 ft (90.0 m)
- Beam: 26.5 ft (8.1 m)
- Draught: 18 ft (5.5 m)
- Propulsion: 2 × Admiralty Standard Range supercharged V16 diesel generators; 2 × English Electric motors; 3,500 bhp, 4,500 shp; 2 shafts
- Speed: 12 knots (22 km/h; 14 mph) surfaced; 17 knots (31 km/h; 20 mph) submerged; 11 knots (20 km/h; 13 mph) at snorkel depth
- Range: 9,000 nautical miles (17,000 km; 10,000 mi) at 12 knots (22 km/h; 14 mph)
- Test depth: 200 metres (660 ft)
- Complement: As launched: 8 officers, 56 sailors; At decommissioning: 8 officers, 60 sailors
- Sensors & processing systems: Sonar: Atlas Elektronik Type CSU3-41 bow array; BAC Type 2007 flank array; Sperry BQG-4 Micropuffs rangefinding array; Sonartech PIPRS intercept processor; Radar: Kelvin Hughes Type 1006
- Armament: Torpedo tubes: 6 × 21-inch (53 cm) bow tubes; 2 × short-length 21-inch (53 cm) stern tubes (later removed); 1996 payload: Mix of 20: Mark 48 Mod 4 torpedoes; UGM-84 Sub Harpoon missiles

HMAS Otama (SS 62/SSG 62) was an Oberon-class submarine, formerly of the Royal Australian Navy (RAN). Built in Scotland, the submarine was the last of the class to enter service when commissioned into the RAN in 1978. Otama was a specialist, one of two "mystery boats", fitted with additional surveillance and intelligence-gathering equipment. Otama was routinely deployed on classified operations to obtain intelligence on Soviet Pacific Fleet vessels and Chinese Navy vessels, and conducted associated coastal surveillance throughout Asia.

The submarine was part of the RAN's largest flag-showing cruise in the Indian Ocean during 1980. From 1983 to 1985, she underwent an extensive upgrade. In August 1987, two submariners died when Otama submerged while they were still working in the fin. Otama remained in service until late 2000, a delay from her original planned decommissioning date to help attenuate the problems with the replacement Collins-class submarines.

Otama was sold to the Western Port Oberon Association in 2001, which planned to preserve her as a museum vessel as part of the proposed Victorian Maritime Centre. Submissions to build the maritime museum at various locations on the Mornington Peninsula were repeatedly rebuffed. In late 2008, the submarine was listed for sale on eBay, but despite several expressions of interest, Otama was not sold. In-principle approval to build the Victorian Maritime Centre on reclaimed land adjacent to the Western Port Marina at Hastings was granted in 2013 but planning permits were not issued.

In September 2022, Otama arrived in Western Australia for scrapping after all attempts to keep her as a museum failed.

== Design and construction ==
The Oberon class was based heavily on the preceding Porpoise class of submarines, with changes made to improve the vessels' hull integrity, sensor systems, and stealth capabilities. Eight submarines were ordered by the RAN, in two batches of four. The first batch was approved in 1963, and the second batch (including Otama) was approved during the late 1960s, although two of these were cancelled before construction started in 1969, with the funding redirected to the Fleet Air Arm. This was the fourth time the RAN had attempted to establish a submarine branch.

The submarine was 295.2 feet (90.0 m) long, with a beam of 26.5 feet (8.1 m), and a draught of 18 feet (5.5 m) when surfaced. At full load displacement, she displaced 2,030 tons when surfaced, and 2,410 tons when submerged. The two propeller shafts were each driven by an English Electric motor providing 3,500 brake horsepower (2,610 kW) and 4,500 shaft horsepower (3,356 kW); the electricity for these was generated by two Admiralty Standard Range supercharged V16 diesel generators. The submarine could travel at up to 12 knots (22 km/h; 14 mph) on the surface, and up to 17 knots (31 km/h; 20 mph) when submerged, had a maximum range of 9,000 nautical miles (16,668 km; 10,357 mi) at 12 knots (22 km/h; 14 mph), and a test depth of 200 metres (656 ft) below sea level. When launched, the boat had a company of eight officers and 56 sailors, but by the time she decommissioned, the number of sailors had increased to 60. In addition, up to 16 trainees could be carried.

The main armament of the Oberons consisted of six 21-inch (533 mm) torpedo tubes. The British Mark 8 torpedo was initially carried by the submarine; this was later replaced by the wire-guided Mark 23. After a multi-year refit was completed in 1985 by Cockatoo Docks & Engineering Company, Otama was upgraded to carry United States Navy Mark 48 torpedoes and UGM-84 Sub Harpoon anti-ship missiles; the last Australian Oberon to undergo the Submarine Weapon Update Program. As of 1996, the standard payload of an Australian Oberon was a mix of 20 Mark 48 Mod 4 torpedoes and Sub Harpoon missiles. Some or all of the torpedo payload could be replaced by Mark 5 Stonefish sea mines, which were deployed through the torpedo tubes. On entering service, two stern-mounted, short-length 21-inch (53 cm) torpedo tubes for Mark 20 anti-submarine torpedoes. However, the development of steerable wire-guided torpedoes made the less-capable aft-firing torpedoes redundant; they were closed off, and later removed during a refit.

Otama was laid down by Scotts Shipbuilding & Engineering Company at Greenock, Scotland on 25 May 1973, launched on 3 December 1975, and commissioned into the RAN on 27 April 1978. The submarine was due to enter service in 1976, but faulty high-power electrical cabling had been installed in Otama and sister boat Orion; stripping out and replacing the cabling delayed each submarine's construction by two years. The delay meant that the two boats could be fitted with Micropuffs rangefinding sonar during construction that the earlier built boats were due to receive as an upgrade.

Otama was the sixth and final Oberon-class submarine to enter service with the RAN. The boat's name comes from a North Queensland Aboriginal word meaning dolphin; this was a break in RAN tradition, which had used the names of explorers and pioneers for previous submarines. Otama was assigned the pennant number 62. The high standard of internal fittings compared to the rest of the class led to the "Gucci Boat" nickname.

Otama received a special electronic surveillance fit after Orion had been fitted with this during construction.

== Operational history ==
After a delivery voyage via ports in Denmark, Florida, and Mexico, Otama arrived at HMAS Platypus in Sydney on 15 December 1978.

During the Cold War, Otama and Orion regularly deployed on surveillance and spying operations using their specialist intelligence-gathering equipment, earning them the nickname "Mystery Boats". These activities starting in 1978 were part of the broader Western nations' intelligence-gathering apparatus, and included surveillance off the coasts of Vietnam, China, India and Indonesia. Obtaining intelligence on Soviet and Chinese made vessels in operations in the Indian Ocean and South China Sea. Observation off the Soviet base at Vladivostok. These activities continued until 1992 after an incident with Orion, and most of Otama's activities and deployments during this period remain classified.

In April 1980, Otama and the destroyer Hobart were sent to Fiji as part of Australia's response to Tropical Cyclone Wally. On 8 September 1980, Otama joined five other RAN vessels to form the Australia Squadron. The Squadron, which included HMA Ships Melbourne, Perth, Derwent, Stalwart, and Supply spent two months in the Indian Ocean as part of a flag-showing cruise; the largest RAN deployment since World War II.

In July 1983, Otama was docked for modernisation by the Cockatoo Docks & Engineering Company. The Submarine Weapon Update Program refit lasted until 1985.

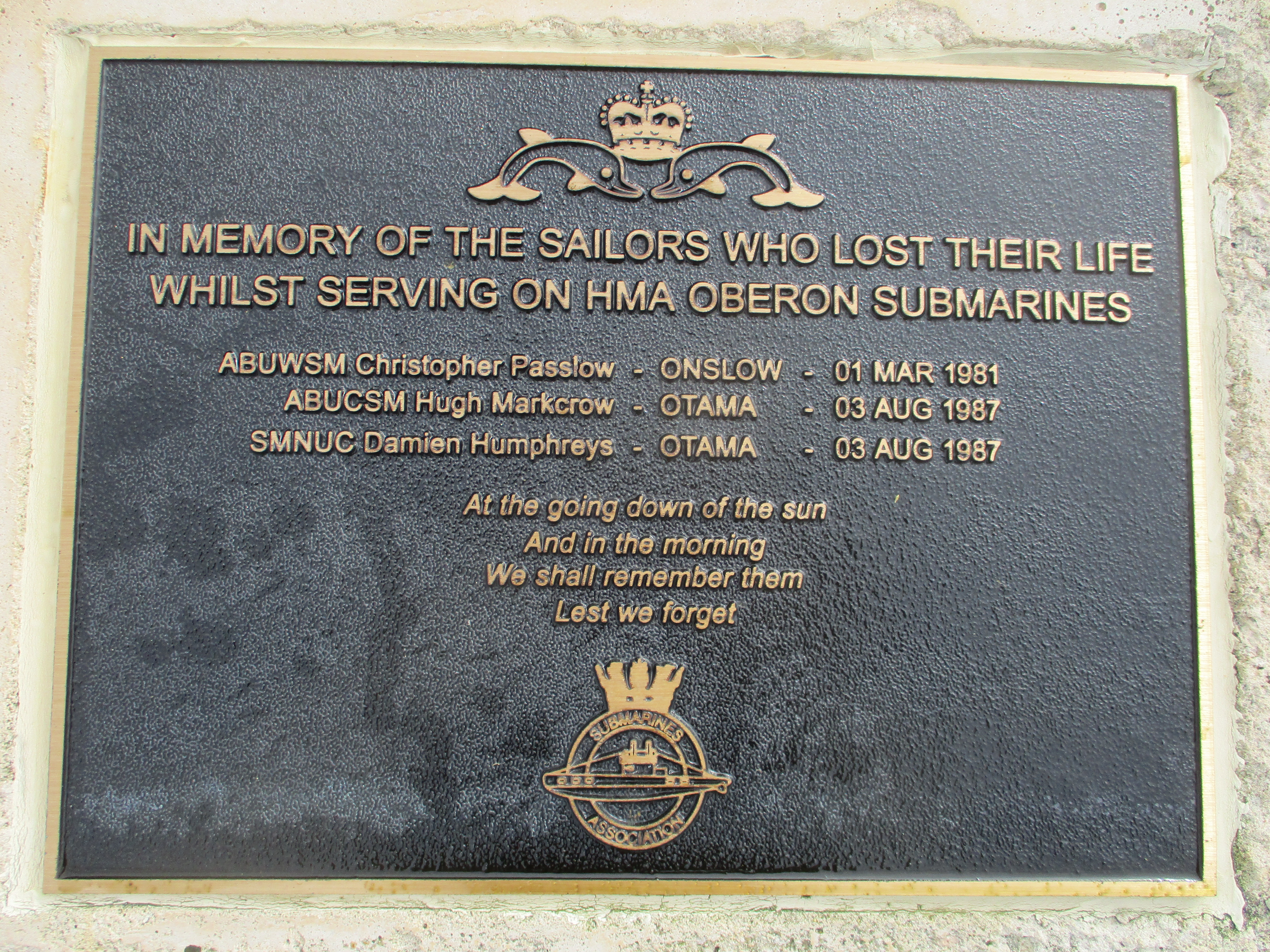
Commemorative plaque at Rockingham Naval Memorial Park for the three sailors killed on board of Australian Oberons

On 3 August 1987, two sailors were killed aboard Otama. At 09:00, the submarine left HMAS Platypus to test a new towed hydrophone array. Extreme weather forced the cancellation of the test, and two sailors were sent into the fin at around 10:20 to retrieve and stow the array. At 10:35, the submarine was prepared for diving, and she submerged four minutes later, with the two men still in the fin. The submariners, on noticing their vessel diving underneath them, climbed up the fin to the bridge and opened the voicepipe in an unsuccessful attempt to contact the control room before being washed overboard. Their absence was not noticed until around 11:00, despite post-dive checks and a rotation of duty stations in the interim, and was not confirmed for at least another half-hour. A search for the submariners was conducted, and one of the bodies was spotted, but could not be recovered. Estimated survival time in the prevailing conditions was only five minutes, and the submariners were not required to wear lifebelts. A naval board of inquiry recommended that action be taken against two officers, although the Navy Office did not take action, as there were multiple factors leading into the incident, and court martialing the two officers could find one or both held solely responsible for the deaths. In addition to the rejection of the board's findings, several officers involved in the incident (including the two singled out by the inquiry), were promoted. A coronial inquiry followed (one of the first heard by the new office of the State Coroner of New South Wales), to which there was some opposition by the RAN, including advising personnel not to cooperate with the task force gathering evidence for the inquiry, and attempting to fend off a request by the coroner for a trip on the submarine replicating the events of the day. Following two separate weeks of hearings in October and November 1988, the state coroner concluded that the incident was the sum of multiple moderate-to-minor breaches of operating procedure and careless negligence (including that notices indicating personnel were outside the submarine were not posted, and key personnel were not informed) aboard a submarine operating in non-standard conditions (such as the testing of new equipment, along with observers and trainees aboard, and a high rotation of personnel between stations in a short period of time). The coroner singled out Otama's commanding officer for allowing so many rules and procedures to be ignored under his command, but did not find sufficient cause to recommend charges against any individual. Several changes were made to casing operational procedures at sea, including making lifebelts compulsory and requiring the senior petty officer on duty to sign out and sign back in personnel working outside. The fatalities aboard Otama were two of the only three deaths aboard Australian Oberons.

From 1996, Otama was given approval to conduct coastal surveillance operations using its specialist intelligence-gathering equipment on Indonesia in particular to obtain information on East Timor.

At the end of March 1999, Otama was reassigned to HMAS Stirling in Western Australia, where the Collins-class submarines were operating. Within days of leaving Sydney, sister boat Onslow was paid off, leaving Otama the only one of her class in service, and the submarine base at HMAS Platypus was cleared for closure.

== Decommissioning and fate ==
Otama paid off on 15 December 2000; problems with the introduction of the Collins-class submarines kept Otama and sister boat HMAS Onslow in service for several years beyond their planned decommissioning date. In the year leading up to her paying off, the pending decommissioning combined with the findings of the McIntosh-Prescott Report to cause the "Fast Track" program, A$1 billion of modifications to make Dechaineux and Sheean fit for service by the end of the year. Otama was the last Australian Oberon to leave service.

The submarine was sold in 2001 to the Western Port Oberon Association, a community group intending to preserve her as a museum vessel and building the Victorian Maritime Centre in Hastings, Victoria. The association beat 32 other tenders for the disposal of Otama, and received a $500,000 "Centenary of Federation" grant from the federal government to fund the purchase and relocation. The grant included the $50,000 purchase price of the submarine, plus $300,000 to tow Otama from Fremantle to Western Port Bay, with the balance to be used in bringing the boat ashore once a suitable venue was built. Otama arrived in Western Port in 2002, where she was moored while waiting for the approval and development of the museum.

By late 2008, plans for three separate locations for the Victorian Maritime Centre – Hastings, Crib Point, and Stony Point – had all been rejected by the Department of Sustainability and Environment. As the Western Port Oberon Association could no longer afford to maintain the submarine while waiting for a favourable decision, Otama was listed on eBay for sale in November 2008. Although no bids were placed by the time the online auction closed in late December, the association received several expressions of interest: including from the St Kilda Marina, Frankston City Council, and one purporting to be a tourism operator but believed by the Western Port Oberon Association to be wanting to restore the submarine for drug smuggling (which was referred to the Australian Federal Police and the Australian Security Intelligence Organisation). No sale was made, and the submarine remained in the possession of the association.

In early 2010, Otama's interior was used to represent a Russian submarine for the short film Deeper Than Yesterday. The 20-minute film won awards at the 2010 Australian Film Institute Awards, the 2010 Leeds International Film Festival, and the 2011 Sundance Film Festival.

In-principle approval to build the Victorian Maritime Centre was given by Victorian environmental minister Ryan Smith in March 2013. The association submitted plans in June for a 2.5-hectare (6.2-acre) site on the seawall of the Western Port Marina at Hastings, to be built on reclaimed land. The proposed site was on the outer edge of the existing seawall, with Otama enclosed in a semi-recessed concrete pit designed to support the main internal deck at ground level, located between the seawall and the planned site of the maritime centre. As of February 2015, design work had been completed, but the association was awaiting the approval of a planning permit.

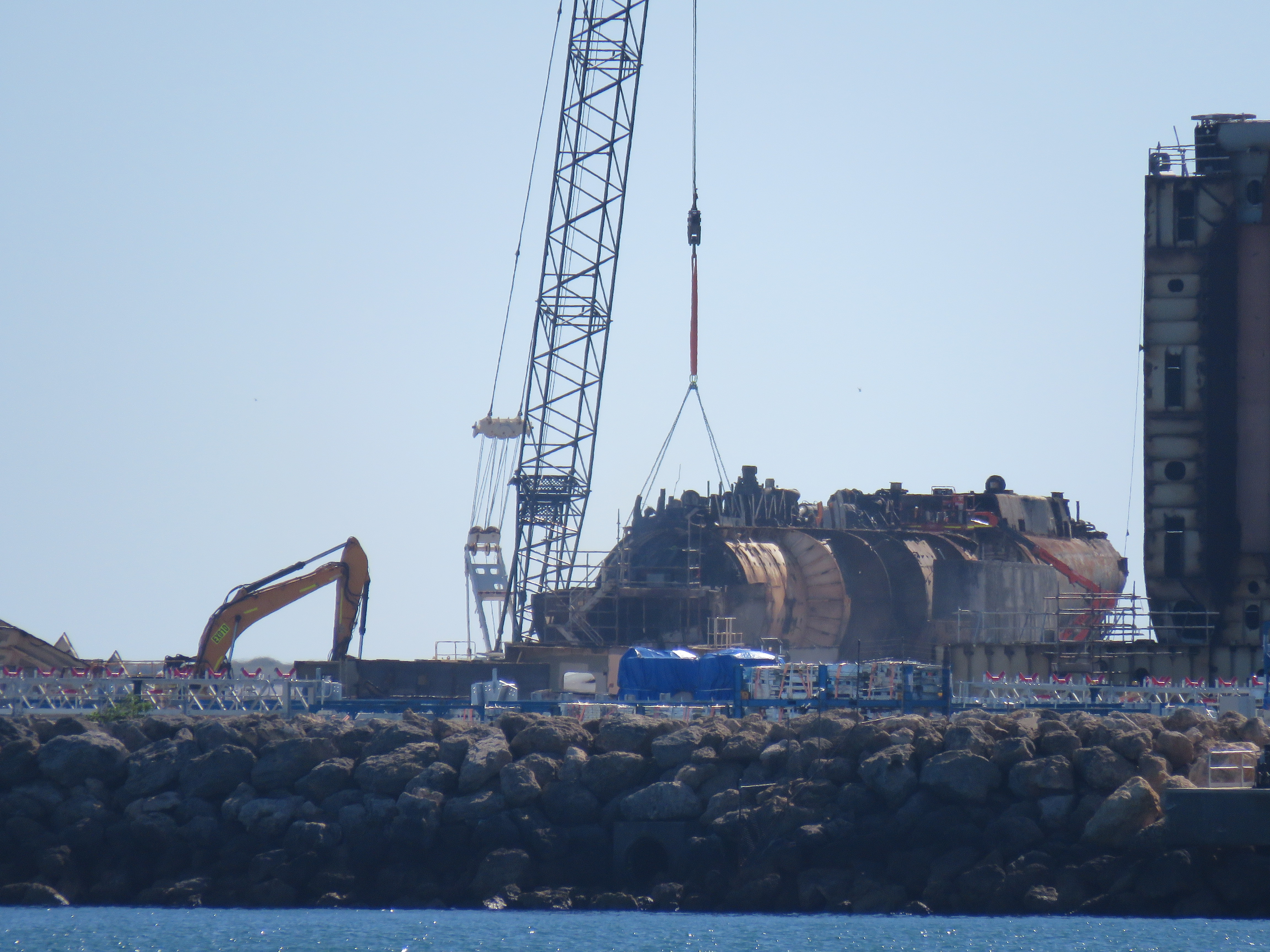
HMAS Otama in the advanced state of dismantling at the Australian Marine Complex in Henderson, Western Australia, in August 2023

In January 2016, it was announced that new mooring cables worth $50,000 were needed if the vessel was to withstand winter storms. By May 2016 difficulties in raising the funds led to the Western Port Oberon Association looking into selling the submarine for scrap if necessary. Pledges of more than $10,000 were received by the end of May. The following month the moorings were repaired by Patrick Ports Hastings after being contracted by Parks Victoria. In June 2021, the ship listed and was in danger of capsizing.

In September 2022, the decision was made to scrap the Otama, with Parks Victoria moving to remove the vessel and scrap it, despite the previous efforts to preserve the vessel, and its heritage value.

On 13 September 2022, the semi-submersible vessel, Rolldock Sun, hired by the Department of Defence arrived in Western Port Bay to uplift Otama for transfer to Henderson, WA and breaking up. Passage to Western Australia commenced on 19 September 2022. After arriving at the scrapping yard later in 2022, HMAS Otama was scrapped.
