= Victorian Maritime Centre =

Maritime museum in Melbourne, Australia

- Location of the maritime museum in Greater Metropolitan Melbourne
- Established: c. 2000s
- Location: 220 The Esplanade, Crib Point, Victoria, Australia
- Coordinates: 38°20′55″S 145°12′55″E
- Type: Maritime museum; Naval museum
- Visitors: Open weekends only
- Owner: Western Port Oberon Association
- Employees: Nil; volunteers
- Website: maritimecentre.com.au

BP Refinery Administration Building (former)

General information
- Status: Completed
- Type: Administration building
- Completed: 1965; 61 years ago
- Closed: 1985 (BP vacated)
- Cost: A$490,000
- Client: BP Australia

Technical details
- Structural system: Steel truss
- Material: Bricks; glass; aluminium; steel; slate; timber; bronze; blackbean panelling; vinyl
- Size: 35 by 25 m (115 by 82 ft)
- Floor count: 2

Design and construction
- Architect: Don Hendry Fulton
- Structural engineer: Norman Mussen
- Services engineer: Cyril Jewel and Associates
- Quantity surveyor: P.O. Forster & Associate
- Main contractor: Van Driel Pty Ltd
- Awards: Victorian Architecture Medal (1966)

Victorian Heritage Register
- Official name: BP Refinery Administration Building (former)
- Type: Registered place
- Designated: 5 May 1994
- Reference no.: H1016
- Heritage overlay no.: HO240
- Categories: Residential buildings (private); Education

Register of the National Estate
- Official name: BP Administration Building (former)
- Type: Defunct register
- Designated: undated
- Reference no.: 103692

The Victorian Martine Centre is a maritime and naval museum, located at 220 The Esplanade in Crib Point, Victoria, Australia. The museum is located within the former BP Refinery Administration Building.

Built in 1965 on the traditional lands of the Bunurong people, the BP Refinery Administration Building was added to the Victorian Heritage Register on 5 May 1994 in recognition of its historical and architectural significance; and was also added to non-statutory lists by the Victorian branch of the National Trust on 11 April 1994 and the now defunct Register of the National Estate on an unknown date.

== History ==
=== BP Administration history ===
In 1920, an agreement was signed by the Australian Government and the Anglo-Persian Oil Company (later to become BP) to form the Commonwealth Oil Refineries (COR). In 1924, COR constructed Australia's first oil refinery at Laverton near Melbourne. This refinery had the capacity to refine 100,000 tonnes (110,000 short tons) of crude oil per annum; and in that same year, depots were established in all other Australian states. In country areas of Queensland, New South Wales, and South Australia, Dalgety and Co. acted as COR's agent in the marketing of lubricating oils and petroleum products which were sold through a network of COR service stations. The red, white, and blue shield of COR soon became a familiar sight all over Australia.

COR continued to expand during the 1930s and after a brief respite in production during World War II, when all companies operated collectively under the name of Pool Petroleum Pty. Limited. COR began trading again in 1947. In 1952, BP acquired the Australian Government's shares of COR. BP began construction of the large Kwinana Oil Refinery in Western Australia which, in 1955, was the largest engineering project undertaken in Australia. When the Kwinana refinery began operating later that year, the Laverton refinery was closed. In November 1957 the company's name was officially changed from Commonwealth Oil Refineries to BP Australia Limited. The COR symbol was phased out and replaced with the green and gold BP shield. The company broadened the distribution of its petroleum products throughout Australia and consolidated BP's position as a major brand in the marketing of petroleum in this country.

In 1966, a second refinery commenced operations in Victoria. This was the first refinery constructed under the name of BP Australia Limited and was built at Crib Point in Western Port Bay. The location of Western Port was crucial as the deep waters of the bay could accommodate the largest ocean going oil tankers unlike the dangerous passage through the heads of Port Phillip Bay.

In July 1984, BP Australia acquired the Bulwer Island Refinery in Queensland, previously owned by the Australian subsidiary of the US-company, Amoco, and had been in operation since 1965. By March 1985 the Western Port refinery had become uneconomical and ceased production. In 1985 the Kwinana and Bulwer Island refineries became the major refining centres for BP Australia's on-shore operations. The Administration Building at Crib Point has been vacant since 1985.

=== Museum history ===
The Western Port Oberon Association was formed during 1998 to acquire HMAS Otama, an Oberon-class submarine operated by the Royal Australian Navy from 1978 to 2000. The decommissioned Otama arrived into Western Port Bay on 30 April 2002. After many years of trying to get her ashore, which was unsuccessful, she was subsequently sent to Western Australia for scrapping.

There were plans to establish a larger maritime centre in Hastings with the new site featuring the Otama. The ship Wyuna is also planned to be displayed at the centre. For a time she was docked at Beauty Point, Tasmania, and after being refurbished for 18 months she was to be moved to Melbourne Docklands. After this berth became unavailable, the vessel was docked at Inspection Head Wharf in Beauty Point. After a period there, she was towed into Bell Bay where she lays at anchor as of January 2016.

The planned display of the vessels would have the Otama displayed out of the water, with the Wyuna in a wet berth alongside it.

== Description ==
=== BP Administration description ===
The former BP Refinery Administration Building at Crib Point was built for BP Australia, to a design by architect Don Hendry Fulton. Fulton was commissioned by Richard Seddon, a Director of BP Australia, and his mission was to provide BP Australia with a high profile building that would reflect the firm's position at the forefront of industry in Australia. As part of that task, Fulton commissioned well-known sculptor Norma Redpath to design a bronze sculpture for the entry foyer. Redpath, who at that time was working in Milan, corresponded with the architect over the design sending sketches of her initial proposals and their developed stages back to Australia. The final design which measured 3 by 1.2 metres (9.8 by 3.9 ft) was cast in Milan then shipped to Australia, and was based on themes of industry and the role of petroleum products in that process.

The building itself was designed in 1964 and was completed by 1965 before its opening in 1966. The builders were Van Driel Pty Ltd, the structural engineer was Norman Mussen, and the mechanical engineers were Cyril Jewel and Associates, and the quantity surveyors were P.O. Forster & Associates. The total cost of the building including a car-park and landscaping was A$490,000.

The building is prominently sited and faces seaward to a jetty and the shores of Western Port Bay where the largest ocean-going oil tankers once serviced the Crib Point Refinery. The building is set back from the road. To its east and north sides, it is surrounded by a series of mature lemon scented gums, to the south by beds of agapanthus, and to the west by scrubby bush, before the expanse of the former refinery behind.

The former administration building is a two-storey structure that measures approximately 35 by 20 metres (115 by 66 ft). The building features a brick ground floor mounted on a low plinth, a cantilevered glass curtain wall on the first floor overhung by cornice-like eaves and an enclosing colonnade. All office functions for the building are located on the perimeter of the top floor along aluminium framed glass walls and grouped about a central services core, central records and open office area, the latter of which sits beneath an illuminated ceiling. On the ground level is a staff dining room and associated kitchen, a lecture room, medical suite and plant room. Opening off the north-facing dining room is a paved terrace.

Externally, a series of steel columns encased in concrete with a Vinstone finish (smooth white with quartz chips) surrounds the building forming a peripteral colonnade. These columns support a giant steel truss roof which has an extremely generous overhang and a tapered soffit giving the building its distinctive Oriental appearance. Erected at an early stage, these columns were wrapped in polythene during construction to protect them against staining. Each column splays outward at its base and at the top of the column is completed with an elegantly designed exposed steel pin joint. The clarity of construction is depicted at all times and the classical nature of the composition is accentuated by the entire building appearing to sit on a low podium.

The ground floor walls are of tan brick and glass with the transition to first floor being achieved by a cantilevering and curved concrete soffit. This detail has the effect of making the first floor appear to float above a brick base and hang from the all-encompassing roof above. The entry facade is formal and symmetrical with all window and brick panel divisions rigorously aligned with the surrounding giant order colonnade. The glazing to the first floor offices is full height and to assist in the ventilation of these spaces, inward folding panels integral with the floating blackbean chair-rail panels were designed to hinge back to reveal flyscreen louvred panels and catch cool breezes off the sea. Each of these special panels is centred on a perimeter column.

Internally, an open stair-well with a deep timber handrail typical of bold 1960s detailing links the carpeted entrance foyer with the upper floor. In addition to the Redpath sculpture, other interior finishes and fittings include the slate tiles at the entry doors, a deep timber handrail to the stair, an extensive use of blackbean panelling for walls, chair-rails and joinery, vinyl tiles in the service areas and staff dining hall, grey terrazzo panels in the bathroom areas and mosaic tiles to the internal ground floor columns. The colours for the interior are made from a palette of ivory, grey, beige and olive complemented by the strong dark finish of black bean timber.

Immediately to the south of the administration building, connected by a canopy, is a single-storey, flat-roofed banking and gatekeeper's office featuring slim roof lines and expansive areas of glass.

The former administration building was awarded the Victorian Architecture Medal in 1966 by the Victorian branch of the Royal Australian Institute of Architects.

The building, combines classical composition with a distinctive temple-like roof form, shifting away from the tenets of the International Style. Austere, rational and elegant, the building is an example of Don Hendry Fulton's designs which also included buildings for remote company towns, laboratories and prefabricated buildings for the scientific bases in Antarctica.

The building has functional design space and is noteworthy for its use of a repetitive rhythm of columns, its curved cantilevered first floor, its alternative ventilation system for the first floor windows and the reliance on carefully considered proportions and detailing.

Commissioned by BP Australia Ltd as the flagship for its second refinery in Australia, the building has a strong association with BP, a major petroleum company, first established in Australia in 1920. It demonstrates the desire of the company to create a high quality corporate image against the backdrop of an industrial plant.

Redpath's sculpture was removed by BP Australia in 1985 and was repositioned externally at BP's headquarters building, BP House in St Kilda Road, Melbourne.

=== Museum description ===
The Victorian Maritime Centre is run by a group of volunteers who are members of the Western Port Oberon Association (WPOA), and operates as a not-for-profit organisation. The museum provides an overview of both the Royal Australian Navy and the merchant navy. The MacKinnon Library at the centre is a premier research destination and houses over 2,000 books, rare newspapers, journals, naval magazines, and historical photographs.

== See also ==
- Architecture of Melbourne
- List of museums in Melbourne
- List of places on the Victorian Heritage Register in the Shire of Mornington Peninsula
- Westernport Refinery
