= Coolart Wetlands and Homestead Reserve =

Historic estate and reserve in Melbourne, Victoria, Australia

- Coolart
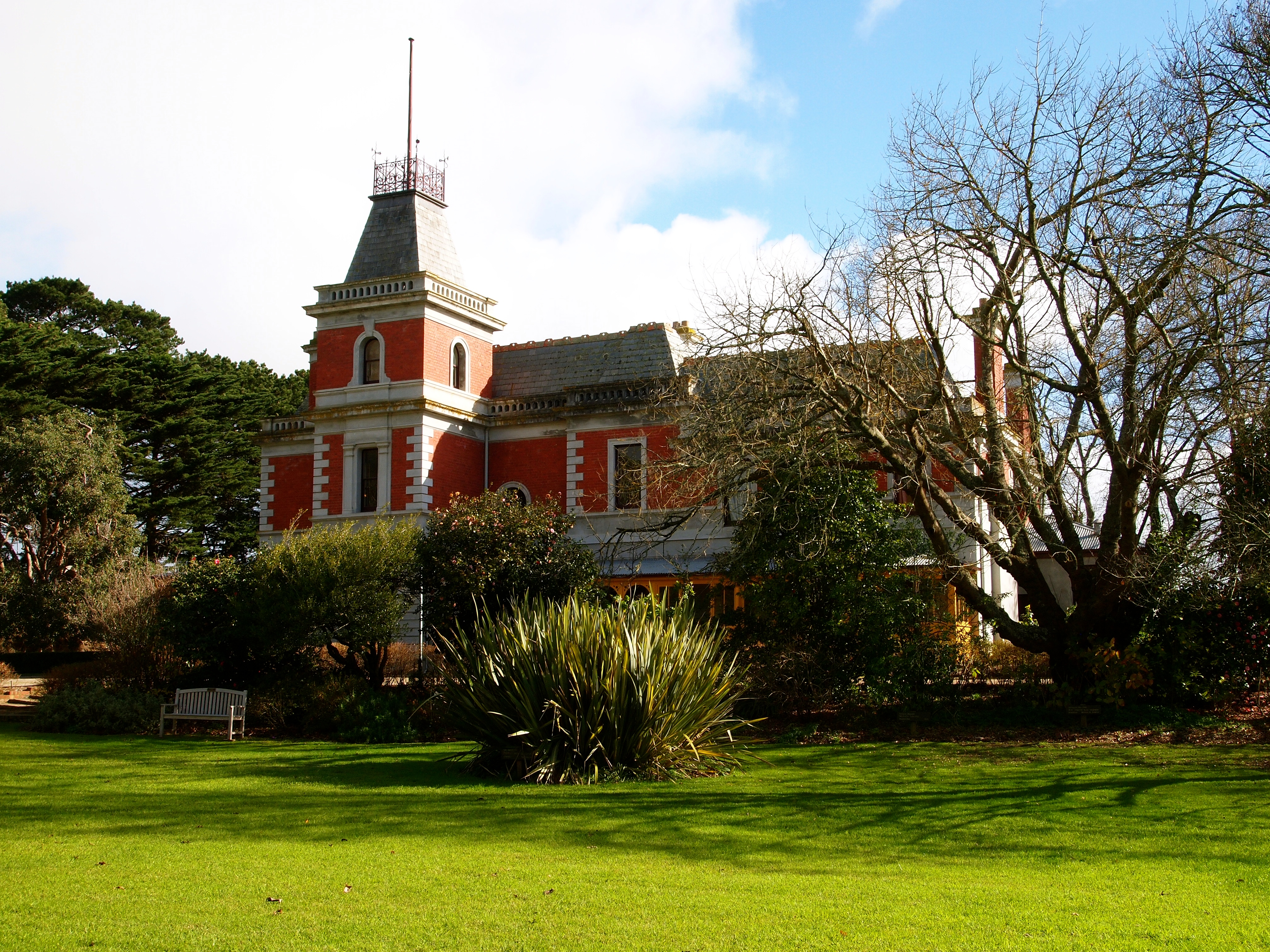
- Coolart homestead in winter, 2014
- Interactive map of Coolart Wetlands and Homestead Reserve
- Location: 36–40 Lord Somers Road, Somers, Mornington Peninsula, Melbourne, Australia
- Coordinates: 38°23′13″S 145°08′23″E
- Area: 87.5 ha (216 acres)
- Created: c. 1840 (as a pastoral run)
- Operator: Parks Victoria (since 1996)
- Owner: Victorian Government (since 1977)
- Website: parks.vic.gov.au
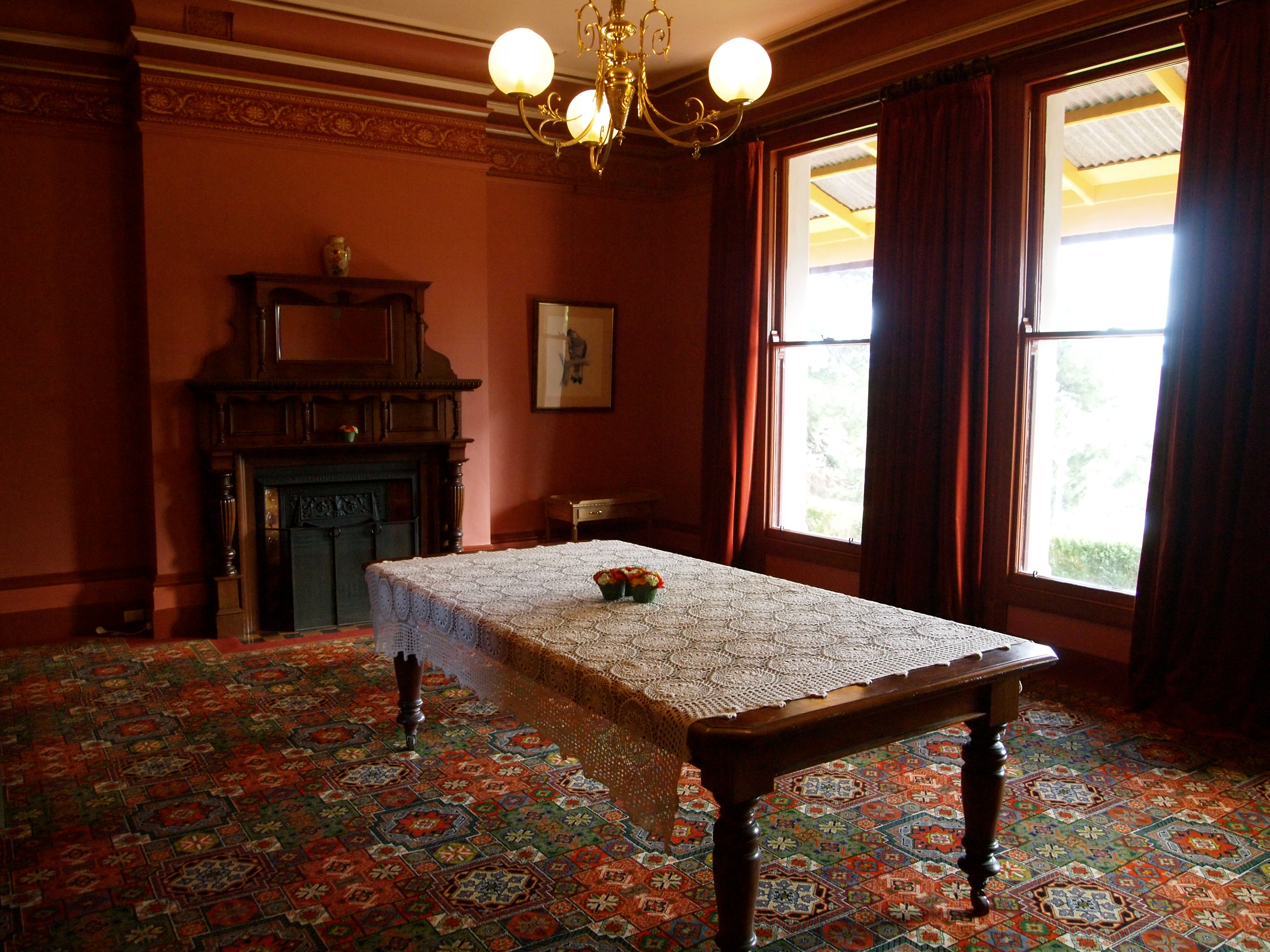
- Interior of the homestead, 2014

- Location in Victoria
- Type: Homestead / Mansion
- Etymology: Bunurong: kulluk (sandy)

History
- Built: 1896–1897
- Built for: Frederick Sheppard Grimwade

Site notes
- Material: Bricks; wrought iron; timber; leadlight; shingles
- Architect: Reed, Smart and Tappin
- Architectural style: Victorian Second Empire
- Owner: Frederick Sheppard Grimwade (1855–1907); Thomas J. Luxton (1937–1968); Victorian Government (since 1977)
- Public access: Wednesday, Saturday & Sunday; 11am – 3pm AEST/ADST

Victorian Heritage Register
- Official name: Coolart
- Type: Registered place
- Designated: 20 December 1989
- Reference no.: H0759
- Heritage overlay no.: HO118
- Categories: Farming and Grazing; Parks, Gardens and Trees; Residential buildings (private)

Register of the National Estate
- Official name: Coolart
- Type: Defunct register
- Designated: undated
- Reference no.: 5829

The Coolart Wetlands and Homestead Reserve, more commonly known as Coolart, is an 87.5-hectare (216-acre) (Note: In 1910, it was reported that the pastoral run was 809 hectares (2,000 acres). By the time the property was sold in 1937, it was 337 hectares (832 acres).) homestead, wetlands, nature reserve, and historic house museum. Located in Somers, approximately 70 kilometres (43 mi) southeast of central Melbourne, the reserve comprises a late 19th-century mansion-like homestead with adjacent formal gardens, wetlands and coastal woodlands with walking tracks.

Coolart homestead was built between 1896 and 1897 and is the remnant of one of the oldest grazing properties on the Mornington Peninsula. The property was added to the Victorian Heritage Register on 20 December 1989; and was also added to non-statutory lists by the Victorian branch of the National Trust on 21 August 1980 and the now defunct Register of the National Estate on an unknown date.

Owned by the Victorian Government and managed by Parks Victoria, the homestead and grounds are open to the public. The adjacent grounds are a popular venue for picnics, nature walks and birdwatching. The homestead features an exhibition of historic photographs, with changing art exhibitions.

== History ==
Coolart is located on the traditional lands of the Bunurong people, with the word coolart deriving from colourt, coolourt or kulluk, the Bunurong name meaning sandy area, referring to the nearby Sandy Point.

With European settlement of the area, Coolart was taken up as a pastoral lease in 1839 by brothers Alfred and Henry Meyrick; (Note: Merrick Creek and the settlement of Merricks were named in honour of the Meyrick brothers.) who developed a vast extent of land, and, in c. 1846, moved to Gippsland. The Coolart lease changed hands a number of times. Most of its owners, many of them prominent figures, left their mark on the property; and included William and John Payne (1846–53), Harry Drew (1853–54), Joseph Hann (1853–62), and John Benn and Theodutus John Sumner (1862–75); the latter were partners in the Melbourne business of Grice, Sumner and Co.

It is believed that the original barracks accommodation building and brick outbuildings were erected in the 1860s; and may be regarded as one of the most important historic buildings on the Mornington Peninsula.

The Coolart estate was purchased as a farming property in 1895 by Frederick Sheppard Grimwade, a Melbourne businessman and parliamentarian, with the two-storey brick homestead built between 1896 and 1897 as his family's country retreat. In 1907 Grimwade sold the Coolart estate to Thomas Shaw Armstrong, a grazier, who carried approximately 2,000 head of sheep in 1908.

Subsequent owners were Capt JAS Balmain, Stewart Robertson, John Feehan and, from 1937, the noted Melbourne businessman Thomas J. Luxton whose family owned with the McEwans Hardware chain of stores. Luxton had a significant involvement with the property, most notably in the creation of the modern homestead garden and the creation of wetlands and a private wildlife reserve. Luxton persuaded the Victorian government to declare the property a wildlife sanctuary and began a program of habitat development that included the construction of an artificial lake and other wetlands for waterbirds.

During Feehan's ownership, part of the estate was gifted in c. 1930 to enable the establishment of the Lord Somers Camp.

Luxton died in 1968, and, in 1977, Coolart was purchased by the Victorian government for conservation and education purposes. Parks Victoria took over the management of the property in 1996, advised by the Coolart Wetlands and Homestead Trust.

== Description ==
=== Built structures ===
The Coolart Homestead was designed by the architectural firm Reed, Smart and Tappin, as a substantial two-storey brick house, with a third-storey tower and several outbuildings, in the Victorian Second Empire style.

The homestead is surrounded by a verandah with wrought iron lacework and tessellated tiles. The wide main entry leads into a grand reception foyer, with a formal reception area including a morning room, a large sitting room and grand dining room, each with fireplace. At one end of the ground floor are the original servants' quarters and service areas of the house, that now serve as a large kitchen, sitting room and meeting room. There are tow staircases, from the foyer, a generous timber staircase winds upstairs past an ornate leadlight window; and form the service quarters, a narrow small staircase. Upstairs, off a wide landing, are the main bedrooms and an original bathroom. The house also has a three-storey tower with a mansard roof, one of its most prominent features.

The homestead, former meat house, buttery, shearing shed, and various outbuildings are open to the public. In the homestead is a photographic history of the Coolart estate, from its time as a pastoral lease-holding for farming and grazing, to its 20th century existence as a coastal retreat and racehorse stud.

=== Adjacent grounds ===
Coolart is bordered by Merricks Creek on the south, Somers School Camp on the east, Balnarring Beach road on the west and privately owned farmland on the north. As well as a well-maintained garden there are several wetlands with a bird hide, a wetland observatory with educational facilities, and areas of woodland and farmland. The wetlands are home to a breeding colony of over 1000 Australian white ibises, while koalas, swamp wallabies, and echidnas inhabit the woodlands.

A plaque in the grounds commemorates Graham Pizzey, an Australian author, photographer, and ornithologist, who was the first warden at Coolart, serving from 1980 to 1984.

== Gallery ==
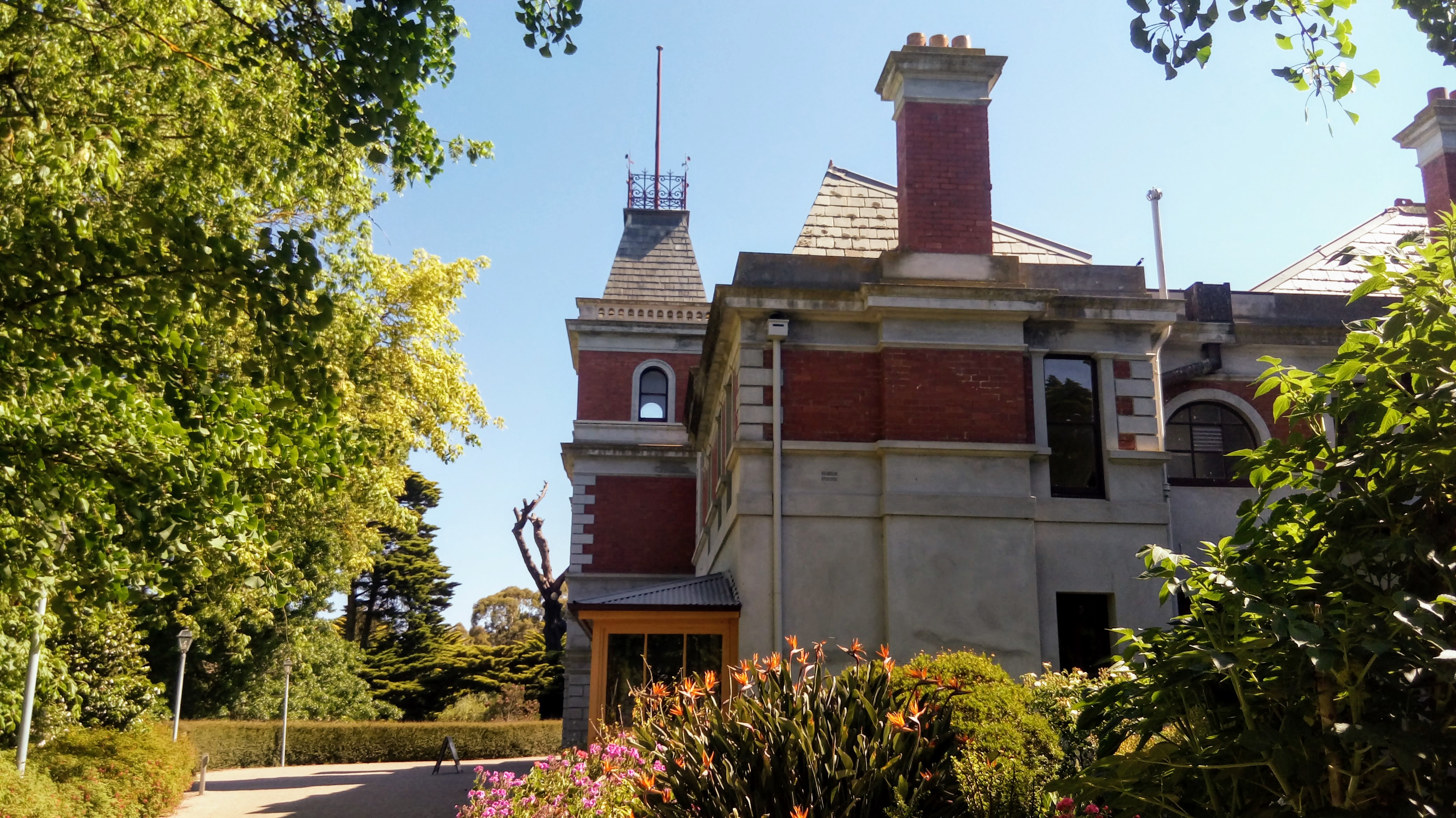
A side-view of the homestead, 2017

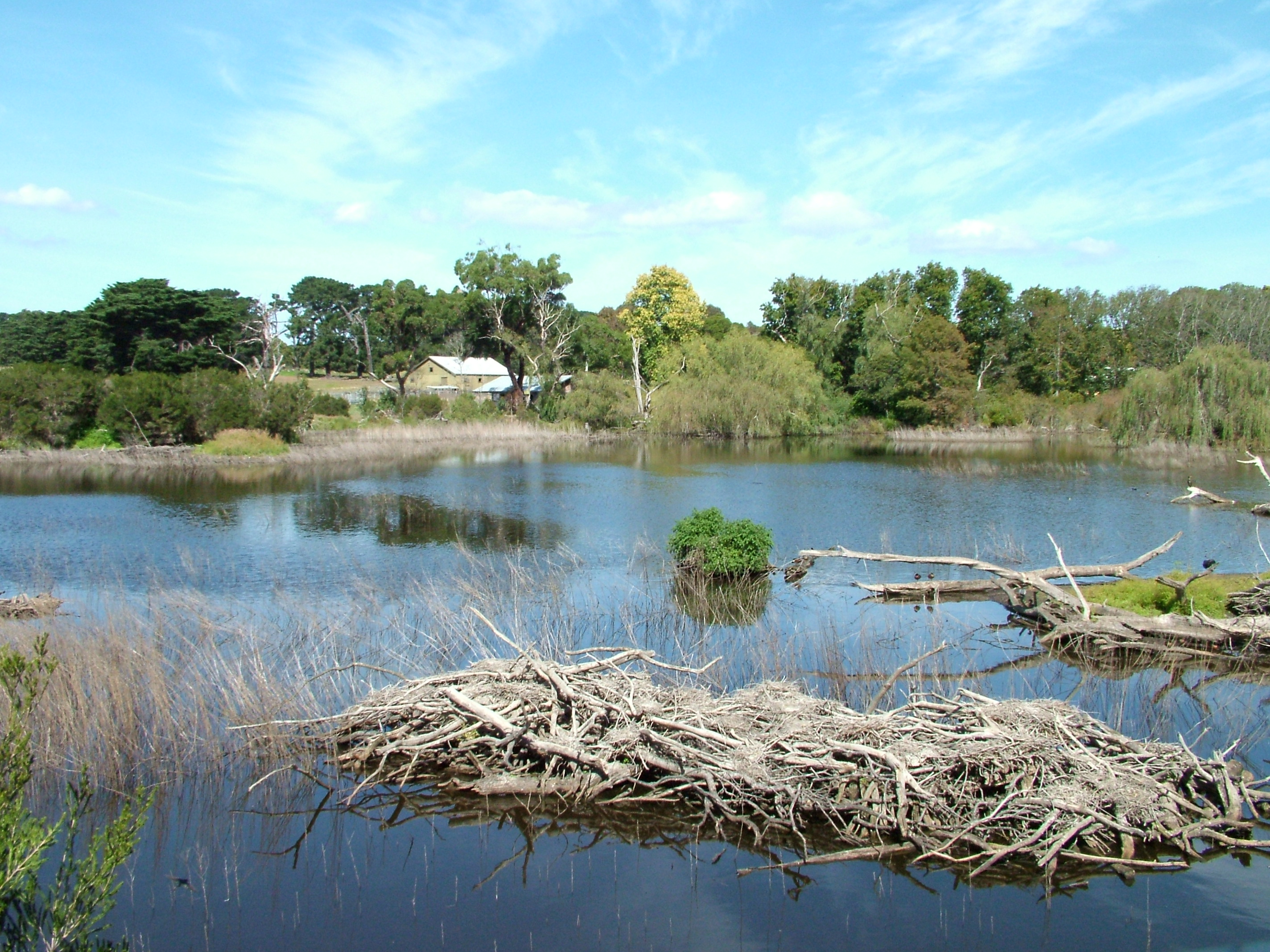
View across the wetlands towards farm buildings, 2005

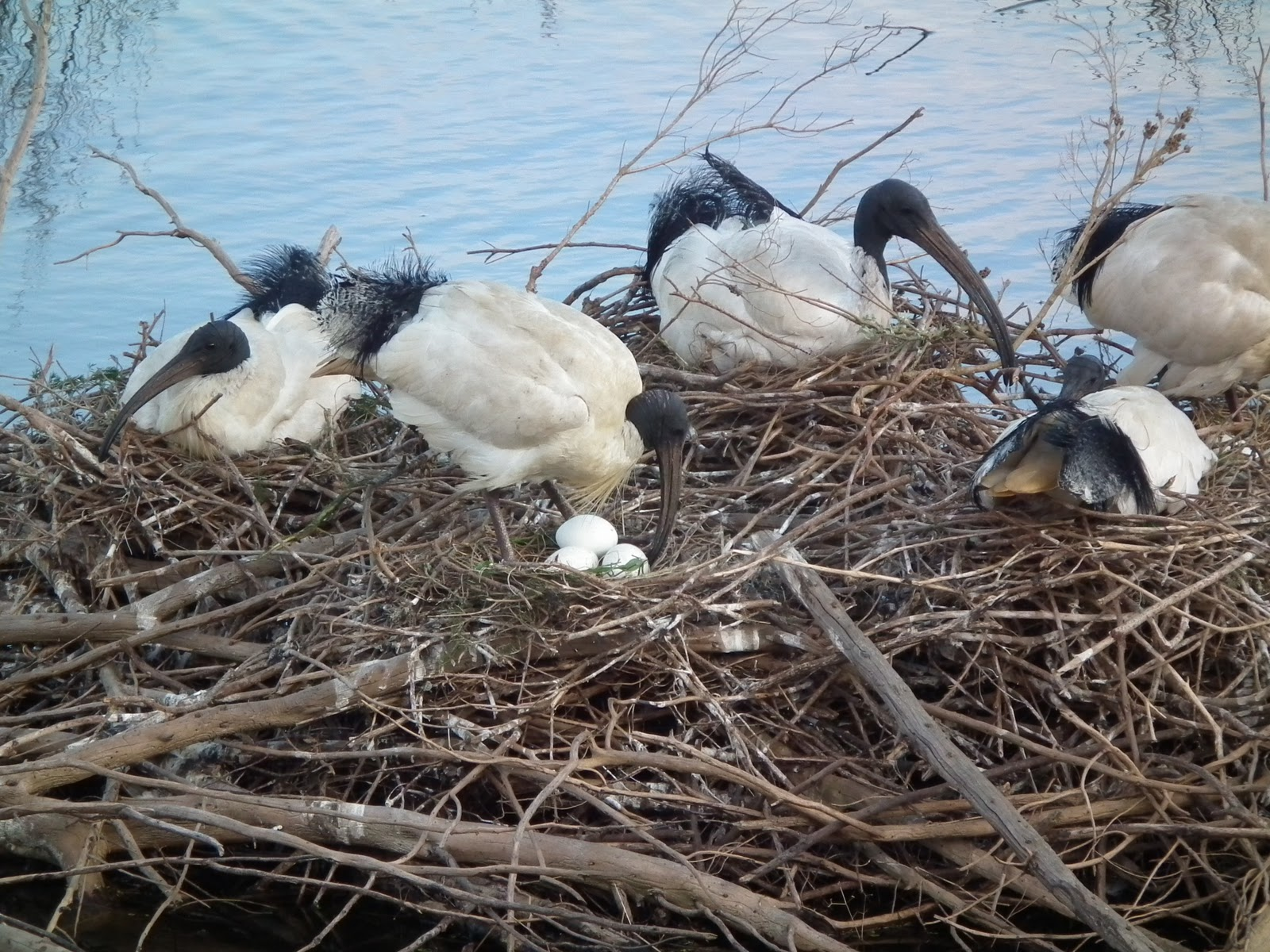
Australian white ibises (Threskiornis molucca) on their nests at the Coolart breeding colony

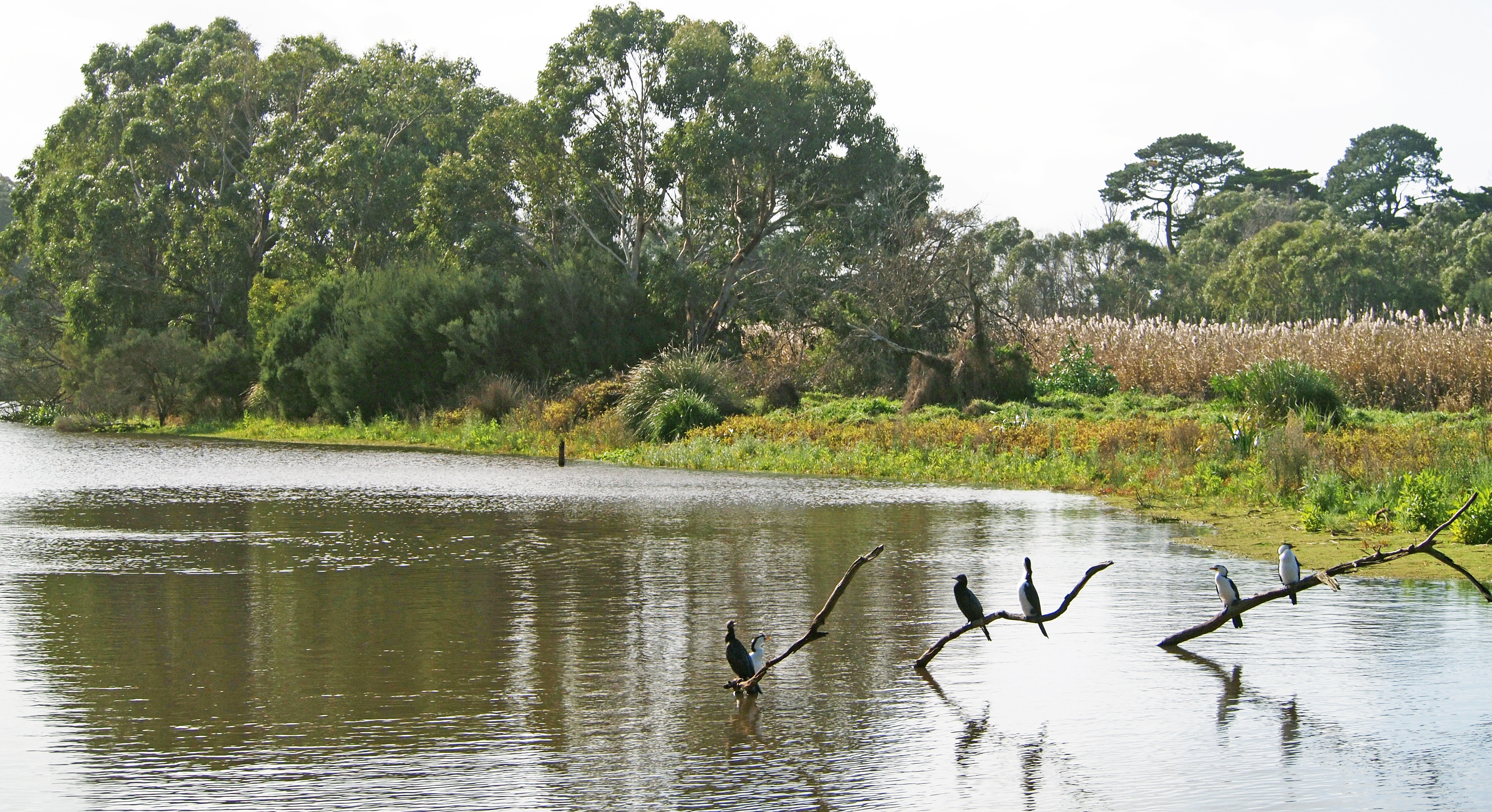
Little pied coromorants (Microcarbo melanoleucos) on the wetlands

== See also ==
- Architecture of Melbourne
- List of places on the Victorian Heritage Register in the Shire of Mornington Peninsula
