= Somers camps =

Annual summer camp program in Victoria, Australia

- Location of the camps in Victoria
- Alternative names: Lord Somers Camp (LSC); Somers School Camp (SSC)
- Etymology: The 6th Baron Somers

General information
- Status: Completed
- Type: School camp sites
- Architectural style: Rustic dormitories; modern hut-style student accommodation
- Location: Somers, Mornington Peninsula, Melbourne, Victoria, Australia
- Coordinates: 38°23′29″S 145°08′45″E
- Completed: 1931; 95 years ago (LSC structures); from c. 1976 (SSC structures)
- Opened: January 1931 (LSC); 27 November 1959 (SSC)
- Renovated: 1980s (LSC)
- Owner: Lord Somers Camp and Power House (LSC); Department of Education (Victoria) (SSC)

Design and construction
- Architecture firm: Stephenson and Meldrum

Victorian Heritage Register
- Official name: Lord Somers Camp
- Type: Registered place
- Designated: 8 September 2011
- Reference no.: H2292
- Heritage overlay no.: HO302
- Category: Recreation and Entertainment

The Somers camps comprise two separate and independent school camps called, respectively, the Lord Somers Camp and the Somers School Camp, both located on Lord Somers Road, in the town of Somers, on the Mornington Peninsula, in Victoria, Australia.

The Lord Somers Camp was founded in 1929 by The 6th Baron Somers, at the time, the Governor of Victoria. Established temporarily in Anglesea, the camp was moved in 1931 to a purpose-built site in Somers in 1931. Used by the Australian Government during World War II as a training school for the airforce personnel and subsequently as a migrant accommodation centre, in 1959 part of the entire site was sold to the Victorian Government Department of Education for the creation of the Somers School Camp, co-located adjacent to the Lord Somers Camp.

The Lord Somers Camp, a private not-for-profit operator, tailors residential programs for primary and secondary school students in a co-educational setting, located on a three-hectare (seven-acre) site, at 150 Lord Somers Road, and can accommodate up to 160 guests. The Somers School Camp is classified as a public co-educational primary school that provides a nine-day residential program for Year 5 and Year 6 students who attend a Victorian primary school. Organised on a regional basis, up to 160 students can be accommodated at the site, located at 124 Lord Somers Road.

In various forms, camps have been running continuously on the site since 1931, excluding during the World War II years of c. 1940-1946 when the site was occupied by the Royal Australian Air Force (RAAF); immediately thereafter the war, when the site was used as a migrant accommodation camp as part of Australia's post-war immigration program, from 1949 to 1957; and, in 2021, during the COVID-19 pandemic.

The Lord Somers Camp site was added to the Victorian Heritage Register on 8 September 2011 in recognition of its historical significance; and was also added to the non-statutory Victorian War Heritage Inventory on an unknown date.

== Program activities ==
Both programs caters for boys and girls, with the Lord Somers Camp catering for teenagers, typically aged between 15 and 17 years, and the Somers School Camp catering for students aged between 10 and 12 years. Activities vary across both sites, and may be age- and/or weather-dependent, and may include abseiling, adventure races, archery, art, barista education, beach games, bike education, boating, bush cooking, bush dancing, bushcraft, challenge swing, diary writing, disco night, drama, drumming, environmental studies — including wetland visitation, flying fox, Indigenous cultural education, individual and team competitions, initiative games, kayaking, marine discovery, orienteering, overnight hiking, pizza-making, raft building, rock climbing, screen printing, singing, snorkelling, stand-up paddle-boarding, surfing, trivia, walks, water safety education, yoga, and others.

== Site description ==
The two Somers Camps sites are co-located, adjacent to each other, in a bush setting, with frontage to Merricks Creek, and near the beach at Somers. The student accommodation at both camp sites consists of single-storey bunk-bed style dormitories with communal buildings. Both camp sites have access to various recreational facilities.

=== Lord Somers Camp ===
The original dining hall at the Lord Somers Camp features exposed timber beams, timber wall panelling, fold-down trestle tables, a large stone fireplace, and a war memorial plaque. It has a small mezzanine level from which films were projected to the outdoor cinema screen. Though most of the original buildings have been replaced, new buildings have been constructed in a sympathetic manner, retaining the simple, rustic appearance of the initial design, to blend with the landscape and to encourage a close-knit community. The one remaining original dormitory building contains small bedrooms and bathrooms opening off a narrow hallway with a timber dado. The central quadrangle and parade ground with flagpoles remains, and the larger dormitory buildings and an office building which surround it were constructed in the 1980s. Two of the original buildings are extant, including the Executive Hut (staff quarters) and the Mess Hut (dining hall).

=== Somers School Camp ===
The Somers School Camp was initially purchased as 22 huts for the provision of schoolrooms and living quarters, external shower buildings and toilet blocks and supporting buildings, was reconfigured progressively since 1976. The camp now comprises contemporary facilities with eight gender-specific huts and each hut can accommodate either twenty female or twenty male students, with separate gender-specific ablution areas, a gender-specific common area, and a room for a teacher/supervisor. The dining room, cinema/assembly hall, library, and administrative block provide central focus areas for co-education. There are extensive indoor and outdoor recreational facilities that include a playground, a high ropes course, and climbing gym, etc.

== Site histories ==
The two camps have a shared and separate history, reflecting their co-location and divergent paths.

=== Lord Somers Camp ===
The Lord Somers Camp was established as a recreation camp for teenage boys only by the Governor of Victoria, Lord Somers, in 1929. Somers aimed to duplicate the success of the hugely popular Duke of York Camps which were held in the United Kingdom, from 1921. Both George VI, as the seventh Duke of York, and Lord Somers were concerned about class differences and wanted to find ways to break down prejudices and build understanding between young people of different backgrounds. They believed that by bringing the teenage boys to live together for a week, they would take this new-found understanding of all members of society with them into adulthood.

The first camp was held in January 1929 at Anglesea, with forty teenage boys from public high schools and forty teenage boys from working-class backgrounds. The camp was run with the assistance of Anglesea Scouts. The camp had only one rule, to 'play the game', and after competitions the winners would applaud the losers.

Such was the success of the first two camps that it was decided that a permanent site should be found, which was close to the beach, secluded but within easy reach of Melbourne, and with flat land for sports fields. The site at Balnarring East was on land donated from the Coolart estate. A purpose-built site at Somers was designed by Arthur Stephenson of Stephenson and Meldrum and completed in advance of January 1931. Initially called East Balnarring, the town was renamed in c. 1930 as Somers, in honour of Governor Somers.

The camps encouraged respect for the monarchy and patriotism, and there were regular services held at the bush chapel. The first "Big Camp" at this site was held in 1931, and was the first with co-founder Dr 'Doc' McAdams as Camp Chief, a position he held until 1954. The camps were managed and operated by volunteers and were a week-long camp, during either the second or third weeks of January annually.

Lord Somers returned to England in 1932 and kept close contact with the camp and its participants. In order to provide a meeting and social outlet for the camp's participants upon their return to Melbourne, a clubhouse located at Albert Park Lake was built in 1932. Called "Power House", the activities expanded into sporting clubs, including rowing, rugby, athletics, hockey, and Australian rules football. Whilst the clubs were originally set up solely for the use of Lord Somers Camp members, gradually the Power House clubs forged their own identity. Now part of the Lord Somer Camp and Power House charity, the Power House program is supported by volunteers and, in 2019 received a A$5 million Australian government grant to redevelop facilities for youth at risk. In 2026, camp management responded to allegations concerning historical child safety issues, and put a temporary stop on volunteers that support programs at both Power House and the Lord Somers Camp.

By 1953, the Lord Somers Camp was back in operation on the site, and commenced providing separate camps for girls in c. 1963. This was formalised in 1986 as the Lady Somers Camp, and it typically followed the boys' camp in January each year, while still staying separate from the boy's program, with different leaders and decisions. Other programs followed, including a camp for intellectuality and physically challenged teenagers, Very Special Kids, and, more recently, orphaned and adopted children supported by the Mirabel Foundation.

=== Australian government use ===
During World War II, the site was requisitioned in c. 1940 (Note: Gregory states that the site was requisitioned in 1941. However, the Australian War Memorial has an image in its collection, dated in 1940, of the camp in use by the RAAF.) by the Department of Defence Co-ordination, and formed the camp in April 1940 for the No. 1 Initial Training School RAAF (No.1 ITS) as part of the Empire Air Training Scheme.

Early in 1940, 92 acres of land were acquired under the National Security Act to enable an initial training school to expand to a planned strength of 600 aircrew trainees. On 12 April 1940 preparations began fo the first students, who arrived on 29 Apr 1940. The camp facilities wee less than ideal with no local water supply and the cold and windy weather made the buildang of suitable accommodation at the new camp a necessity.

Trainees were tutored in subjects which included maths, navigation, law and administration, signals, medical, physical training, science, armament, gas defence and hygiene. Link trainer familiarisation commenced during June 1940, and the training was extended when the first Women's Australian Auxiliary Air Force (WAAAF) recruits commenced trainmg on 8 Jul 1942. The final WAAAF recruit course graduated in February 1943. Additional WAAAF Training commenced wath the first stewardess course in August 1942.

By September 1941, the strength of the unit stood at 35 officers and 266 airmen, with 914 trainees. Aircrew training ceased during June 1945, and there was a general exodus of personnel. By the end of July 1945 a large percentage of the equipment had been returned to store, and personnel numbers had reduce, such that on 6 Aug 1945 No. 1 Initial Training School ceased to function. The formal disbandment of No. 1 Initial Training School was scheduled for 13 Oct 1945.

At the end of the war, the camp was surplus to the needs of the RAAF and the Australian government sold the camp in 1947 for use as a private holiday resort. However, in 1949, the Australian Department of the Interior reacquired the site for use by the Department of Immigration as a migrant accommodation camp as part of Australia's post-war immigration program, and housed between 1,000 and 2,000 immigrants. During that time, a public school was established adjacent to the migrant camp, called the Somers Migrant Centre State School (School No. 4653), from 1949 to 1957 with nine children in attendance. In 1952, a fire in the camp hospital resulted in the death of five children, with calls for review of the migrant facility. The Somers camp, along with several other migrant camps across Australia, was closed from the early-to-late 1950s.

By 1953, the Australian government permitted to Lord Somers Camp to operate the site as a school camp; and, in 1958, the former Somers Migrant Centre State School site was purchased by the Victorian Education Department.

=== Somers School Camp ===
In February 1947, the Department of Education opened the Children’s School Health and Recreation Camp at Crow’s Nest, Queenscliff, and entered into a five-year lease with the Australian Army, who co-shared the facility during annual camps held in January. The Crow's Nest camp operated as a physical education training facility for up to 100 public school children, who were supported over a ten-day residential block, with teacher supervision. Between 1947 and 1952, 6,670 students attended over camp or physical education recreational facility for students in the public school system.

Part of the Lord Somers Camp that was used as a migrant centre and school was purchased by the Victorian Education Department and altered by the Public Works Department to meet the requirements of a school camp. The first group of 100 boys from the St Kilda Inspectorate attended the first camp in September 1959; and the camp was officially opened on 27 November 1959, initially called the Health and Recreation Camp and then the Children's School Camp, and, since 2000, the Somers School Camp. The camp is administered by a school principal, together with a satellite camp called Woorabinda School Camp, on the shores of Lake Narracan, that takes a younger cohort, Years 3 to 5, for shorter, three- and five-day programs.

== See also ==
- List of government schools in Victoria, Australia
- List of places on the Victorian Heritage Register in the Shire of Mornington Peninsula
