= Hastings, Victoria =

Hastings
- Town
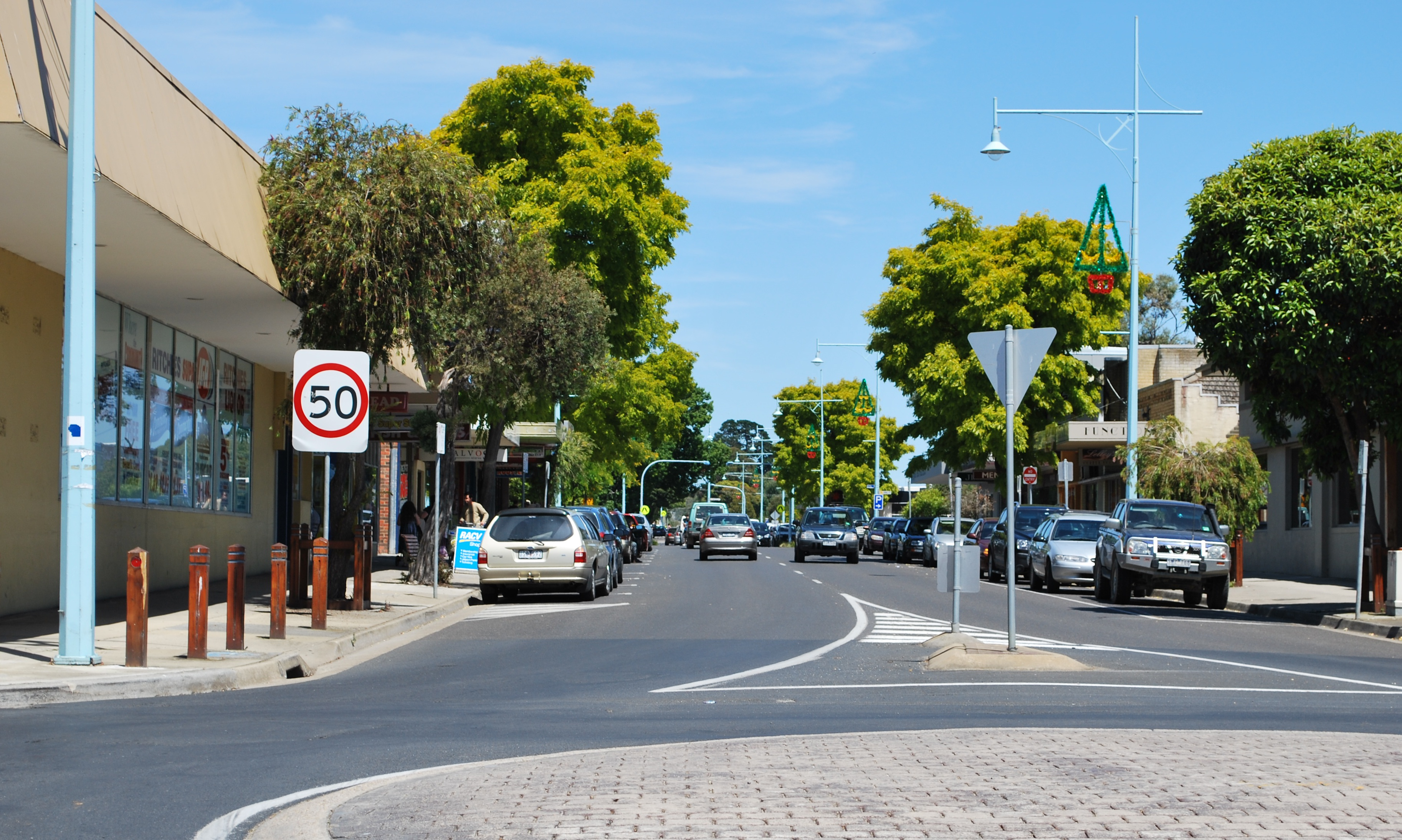
- Main street of Hastings

- Interactive map of Hastings
- Coordinates: 38.306°S 145.189°E
- Country: Australia
- State: Victoria
- LGA: Shire of Mornington Peninsula
- Location: 77 km (48 mi) from Melbourne; 20 km (12 mi) from Frankston

Government
  - State electorate: Hastings
  - Federal division: Flinders

Area
  - Total: 41.6 km^{2} (16.1 sq mi)

Population
  - Total: 10,369 (2021 census)
  - Density: 249.25/km^{2} (645.6/sq mi)
- Postcode: 3915
Localities around Hastings
Moorooduc	Tyabb	Western Port
Tuerong	Hastings	Western Port
Balnarring	Bittern	Western Port

Hastings (Parre Eurruc-Eurruc in Boonwurrung) is a town on the Mornington Peninsula in Melbourne, Victoria, Australia, 58 km (36 mi) south-east of Melbourne's Central Business District, located within the Shire of Mornington Peninsula local government area. Hastings recorded a population of 10,369 at the 2021 census.

Hastings is part of an urban enclave on Western Port comprising Hastings, Bittern, Crib Point, Tyabb, and Somerville. It is served by Hastings railway station on the Stony Point greater-metropolitan line.

Hastings is situated on an inlet on Western Port, a major port and important environmental area. Hastings has multiple marinas and is home to many recreational boating activities.

== History ==
Hastings is thought to be named after a fishing town in England or the British imperial administrator Warren Hastings. Previously known as King's Creek and Star Point, its post office opened on 4 February 1863.

Settlement of the area dates from the 1840s, with fishing being the main industry. Growth took place from the 1850s into the 1870s as the township developed. Expansion continued in the late 1880s and 1890s, aided by the construction of the railway line and the establishment of many orchards. Significant residential development occurred during the 1960s and 1970s, spurred by industrial growth and public housing construction. Growth began to slow from the 1980s. The population has increased since the early 1990s, a result of new dwellings being added to the area.

== Local culture ==
Hastings is one of the 'gateways' to the lower Mornington Peninsula, and is located on the coast of Western Port. The town is surrounded by farmland.

In 2004 Hastings was the overall winner of the Victorian Tidy Town Awards held by the Keep Australia Beautiful Network.

In 2021, Hastings had a population of 10,369 and several major franchises have commenced operations. The opening of Kmart on 19 October 2006 was the first large department store in the town.

Hastings was the seat of the Hastings Shire before this was merged into the Mornington Peninsula Shire, and still has many buildings associated with federal, state and local governments. It has the headquarters of the regional traffic police. There is a modern library in the centre of town, outside of which is a statue of former resident and footballer, John Coleman. Other facilities include a public hall, and a modern aquatic centre.

Hastings has two public primary schools – Hastings Primary and Wallaroo Primary. Hastings Primary School celebrated 150 years in 2022, having been established in 1872, the same year as the Education Act was established in Australia. There is also a private Catholic school named St Marys Primary School, as well as Western Port Secondary College, a state high school (formerly known as Hastings High School).

In October 2003 the town was host to The Princess Royal.

== Population ==
According to the 2021 census, the population of Hastings is 10,369.

- Aboriginal and Torres Strait Islander people made up 2.4% of the population.
- 76.0% of people were born in Australia. The next most common countries of birth were England 6.4%, New Zealand 1.7% and the Philippines 1.1%.
- 88.0% of people spoke only English at home.
- The most common responses for religion were No Religion 49.9%, Catholic 16.4% and Anglican 12.3%.

== Industry ==
Western Port has several industrial complexes, including a BlueScope steel processing works and the major Royal Australian Navy training base, HMAS Cerberus. The Westernport Oil Refinery was operated by BP at Crib Point from 1966 to 1985.

The Port of Hastings Corporation, is the responsible public entity for operating in the Port of Hastings, including maintaining the associated port infrastructure. Port assets include the Stony Point Jetty and Depot, Crib Point Jetty, Long Island Point Jetty and the BlueScope Wharves (Owned by BlueScope), as well as future proposals such as the Victorian Renewable Energy Terminal.

== Military ==
The naval base HMAS Cerberus is located 6 kilometres (3.7 mi) south of Hastings in the suburb of Crib Point, housing many of its personnel on base. However some live in Hastings or other nearby towns. The local Naval Cadet unit, TS Tingira, is also located out of HMAS Cerberus.

== Recreation and tourism ==
Hastings has one small beach, most of the coastline being mudflats. The town also features several large coastline reserves, some of which allow pet dogs to roam leash-free.

Hastings is located on a crescent-shaped bay opening onto Western Port. It is probably the safest small boat harbour on Western Port, as it is easily accessible, and protected from prevailing winds. Therefore, much of the recreation centres around boating or fishing at the local marina and yacht club.

The mudflats support significant mangrove forests, these being the most southerly species of mangrove in the world. Jacks Beach Walk takes hikers through and over the mangroves via a series of boardwalks. The mangrove forests are natural fish hatcheries, important for the maintenance of good fish populations in the bay. A significant area of Western Port north of Hastings has been declared a Marine National Park.

The area around the pier is popular with sightseers, there being a waterfront cafe, and many yachts moored nearby. Pelicans can normally be seen in this area, and the pelicans are fed daily by local fishermen.

Other nearby attractions include the Tyabb antiques centre and Moonlit Sanctuary Wildlife Conservation Park.

The town has an Australian Rules football team competing in the Mornington Peninsula Nepean Football League.

== See also ==
- Shire of Hastings – Hastings was previously within this former local government area.
- Port of Hastings - Port operations in Hastings, managed by the Port of Hastings Corporation.
