= Westernport Refinery =

Former oil refinery in Victoria, Australia

- Location of the refinery in Greater Metropolitan Melbourne
- Interactive map of Westernport Refinery
- Location: Crib Point, Mornington Peninsula, Victoria, Australia; 38°20′56″S 145°12′47″E

Refinery details
- Owner: BP Australia Limited
- Opened: 1966
- Closed: 1 April 1985

Westernport Refinery was an oil refinery operated by BP Australia Limited at Crib Point adjacent to Westernport Bay, in Victoria, Australia. It was constructed from 1963 and started operations in 1966. Its last day of operation was 1 April 1985.

Construction of the refinery began in December 1963. It was designed with an initial throughput of 1,400,000 tonnes (1,500,000 short tons) of crude oil per annum, and able to be expanded to 2,000,000 tonnes (2,200,000 short tons) per annum. It was served by a jetty with two berths for import of crude oil and export of refined products in bulk.

In 1965, BP built the BP Refinery Administration Building, adjacent to the refinery, that remained in use until 1985. The former administration building was added to the Victorian Heritage Register on 5 May 1994 in recognition of its historical and architectural significance; and was repurposed as the Victorian Maritime Centre, a maritime and naval museum.

== Legal dispute ==
Westernport Refinery was the centre of a significant legal dispute which went to appeal to the Privy Council of the United Kingdom as the highest available appellate court at the time. The dispute arose at the beginning of 1970 and after many court cases and appeals, was finally determined by the Privy Council in July 1977. The focus of the dispute was payment of rates under various agreements with both local and state governments, after BP restructured its corporate arrangements.

== See also ==
- List of oil refineries in Australia
