= Crib Point =

- Town
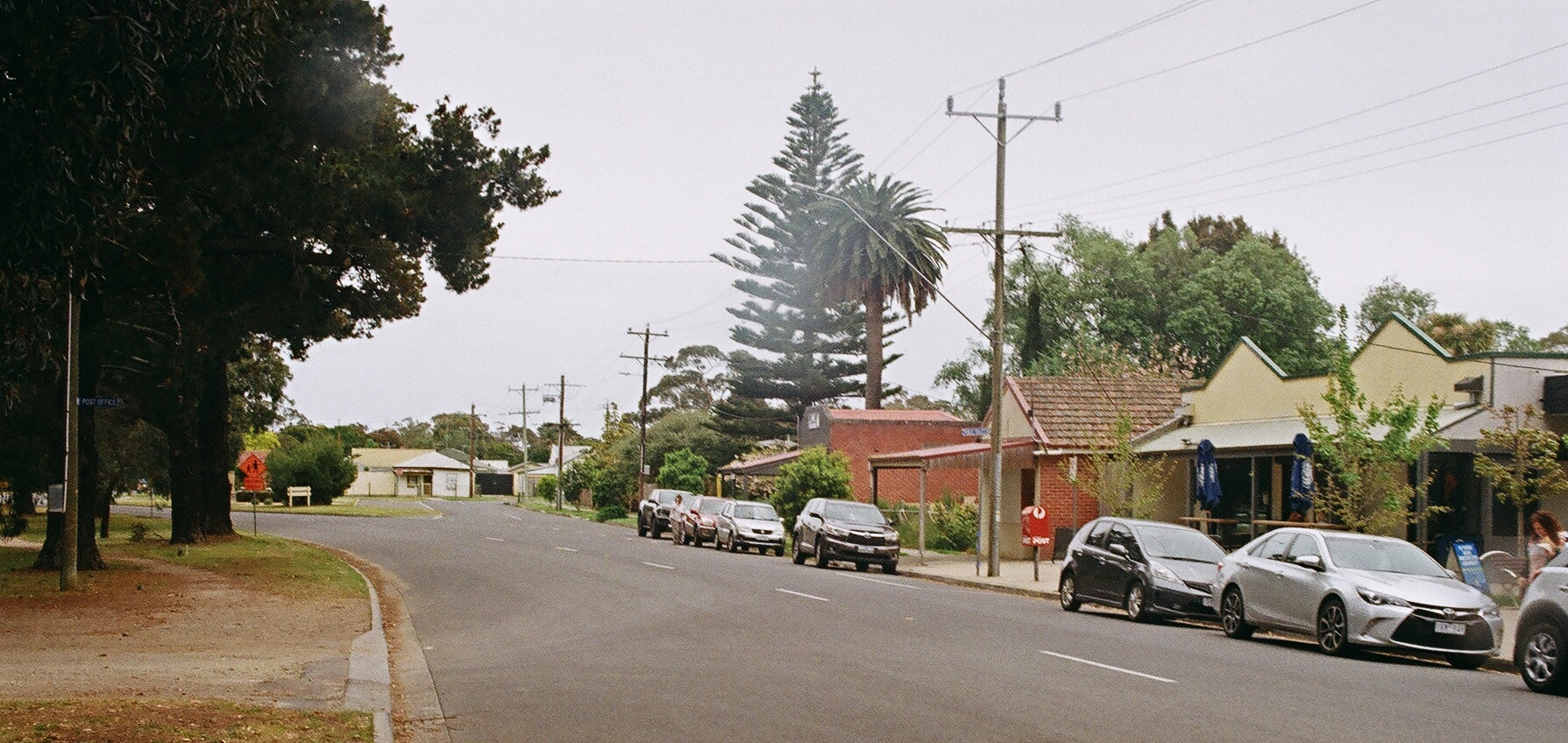
- Crib Point

- Interactive map of Crib Point
- Coordinates: 38°21′47″S 145°12′07″E
- Country: Australia
- State: Victoria
- LGA: Shire of Mornington Peninsula
- Location: 87 km (54 mi) from Melbourne; 7 km (4.3 mi) from Hastings

Government
  - State electorate: Hastings
  - Federal division: Flinders

Area
  - Total: 6.3 km^{2} (2.4 sq mi)

Population
  - Total: 3,343 (2021 census)
  - Density: 531/km^{2} (1,374/sq mi)
- Postcode: 3919
Localities around Crib Point
Bittern	Bittern	Western Port
Bittern	Crib Point	Western Port
HMAS Cerberus	HMAS Cerberus	Western Port

Crib Point is a town on the Mornington Peninsula in the south-eastern suburbs of Melbourne, Victoria, Australia, 64 km (40 mi) south-east of Melbourne's city centre, located within the Shire of Mornington Peninsula local government area. Crib Point recorded a population of 3,343 at the 2021 census.

The town is part of an urban enclave on Western Port comprising Bittern, Crib Point, Hastings, Tyabb, and Somerville. It is opposite a park that has a long stretch of mangroves.

Crib Point is served by three railway stations: Morradoo, Crib Point and Stony Point, the latter of which is the terminus of the greater-metropolitan Stony Point line.

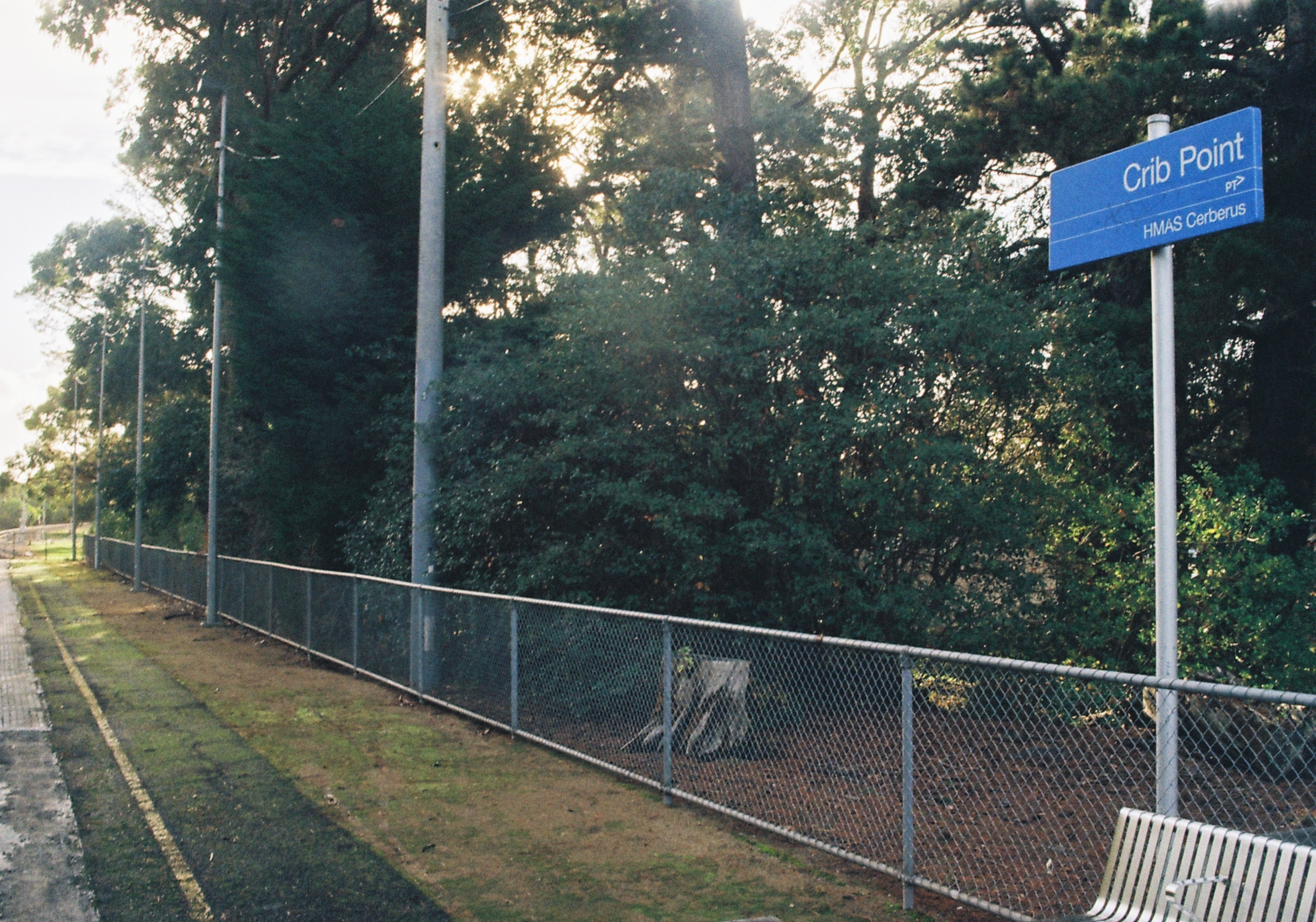
Crib Point station, in 2025

Crib Point Post Office opened on 18 July 1890.

The town has an Australian Rules football team competing in the Mornington Peninsula Nepean Football League.

It is situated near the HMAS Cerberus naval base.

The BP Refinery Administration Building, located at 220 The Esplanade, completed in 1965, and listed on the Victorian Heritage Register, was vacated in 1985 when the Westernport Refinery closed. The building was subsequently repurposed and has provided a temporarily location for the Victorian Maritime Centre, a maritime and naval museum. The museum has a future permanent site announced at Hastings. The museum houses many artefacts of both the Royal Australian Navy and the Merchant Navy.

== Internationally Significant Ramsar Listed Wetland and UNESCO Biosphere Reserve ==
Crib Point is one of the coastal villages of the Mornington Peninsula. This coastline is part of the internationally significant Ramsar-listed wetland which covers most of Westernport Bay - an area of 59,297 hectares (146,530 acres). It is also contained within the Western Port Biosphere Reserve, a UNESCO Biosphere Reserve. Despite these two significant and critical attributes which mean it is fundamental to birdlife, fish breeding and many unique species, there has been unrelenting pressure to exploit this natural asset since the 1960s. The remnants of industry remain at Crib Point.

The communities of Westernport have successfully fought off attempts to reindustrialise the area, including:

- 1965 to 1985 – BP Westernport Refinery at Crib Point jetty (closed in 1985)
- 1987 - Proposed Western Mining ammonia-urea plant (stopped)
- 1992 - Proposed Shell-Mobil "super-tanker" project (stopped)
- 2007 - Proposed Boral Bitumen plant (stopped)
- 2011 - Port of Hastings Container Port strategy (stopped)

== Climate ==
Crib Point has an oceanic climate with relative small thermal differences between seasons, but is still prone to temperature extremes upon northerly winds both in summer and winter.

Climate data for HMAS Cerberus (1991-2017 normals)
Month	Jan	Feb	Mar	Apr	May	Jun	Jul	Aug	Sep	Oct	Nov	Dec	Year
Record high °C (°F)	44.1 (111.4)	45.8 (114.4)	39.7 (103.5)	34.1 (93.4)	25.6 (78.1)	21.7 (71.1)	21.9 (71.4)	25.1 (77.2)	28.9 (84.0)	34.7 (94.5)	36.8 (98.2)	42.4 (108.3)	45.8 (114.4)
Mean daily maximum °C (°F)	24.5 (76.1)	25.0 (77.0)	23.1 (73.6)	19.8 (67.6)	16.6 (61.9)	14.2 (57.6)	13.6 (56.5)	14.6 (58.3)	16.5 (61.7)	18.6 (65.5)	20.6 (69.1)	22.4 (72.3)	19.1 (66.4)
Mean daily minimum °C (°F)	13.9 (57.0)	14.3 (57.7)	12.6 (54.7)	10.0 (50.0)	8.4 (47.1)	6.8 (44.2)	6.3 (43.3)	6.6 (43.9)	7.6 (45.7)	8.8 (47.8)	10.7 (51.3)	11.9 (53.4)	9.8 (49.7)
Record low °C (°F)	5.2 (41.4)	5.0 (41.0)	2.2 (36.0)	−1.7 (28.9)	−1.1 (30.0)	−1.8 (28.8)	−3.0 (26.6)	−2.4 (27.7)	−0.3 (31.5)	−0.9 (30.4)	1.6 (34.9)	3.3 (37.9)	−3.0 (26.6)
Average precipitation mm (inches)	38.4 (1.51)	39.4 (1.55)	45.6 (1.80)	62.4 (2.46)	68.7 (2.70)	72.3 (2.85)	72.7 (2.86)	75.2 (2.96)	67.5 (2.66)	66.8 (2.63)	54.0 (2.13)	53.6 (2.11)	716.6 (28.22)

== See also ==
- Shire of Hastings – Crib Point was previously within this former local government area.
