= HMAS Cerberus (naval base) =

Australian naval base

- HMAS Cerberus, Mornington Peninsula, Victoria in Australia
- Ship's badge of HMAS Cerberus

Site information
- Type: Naval base; Officer and Sailor Training
- Owner: Department of Defence
- Operator: Royal Australian Navy
- Website: navy.gov.au/establishments/hmas-cerberus

Location
- Coordinates: 38°22′01″S 145°11′13″E
- Area: 1,517 hectares (3,750 acres)

Site history
- In use: Flinders Naval Depot (1911–1921); HMAS Cerberus (1 April 1921 – present)

Garrison information
- Current commander: Captain Ben Favelle, CSC RAN

HMAS Cerberus
- Suburb
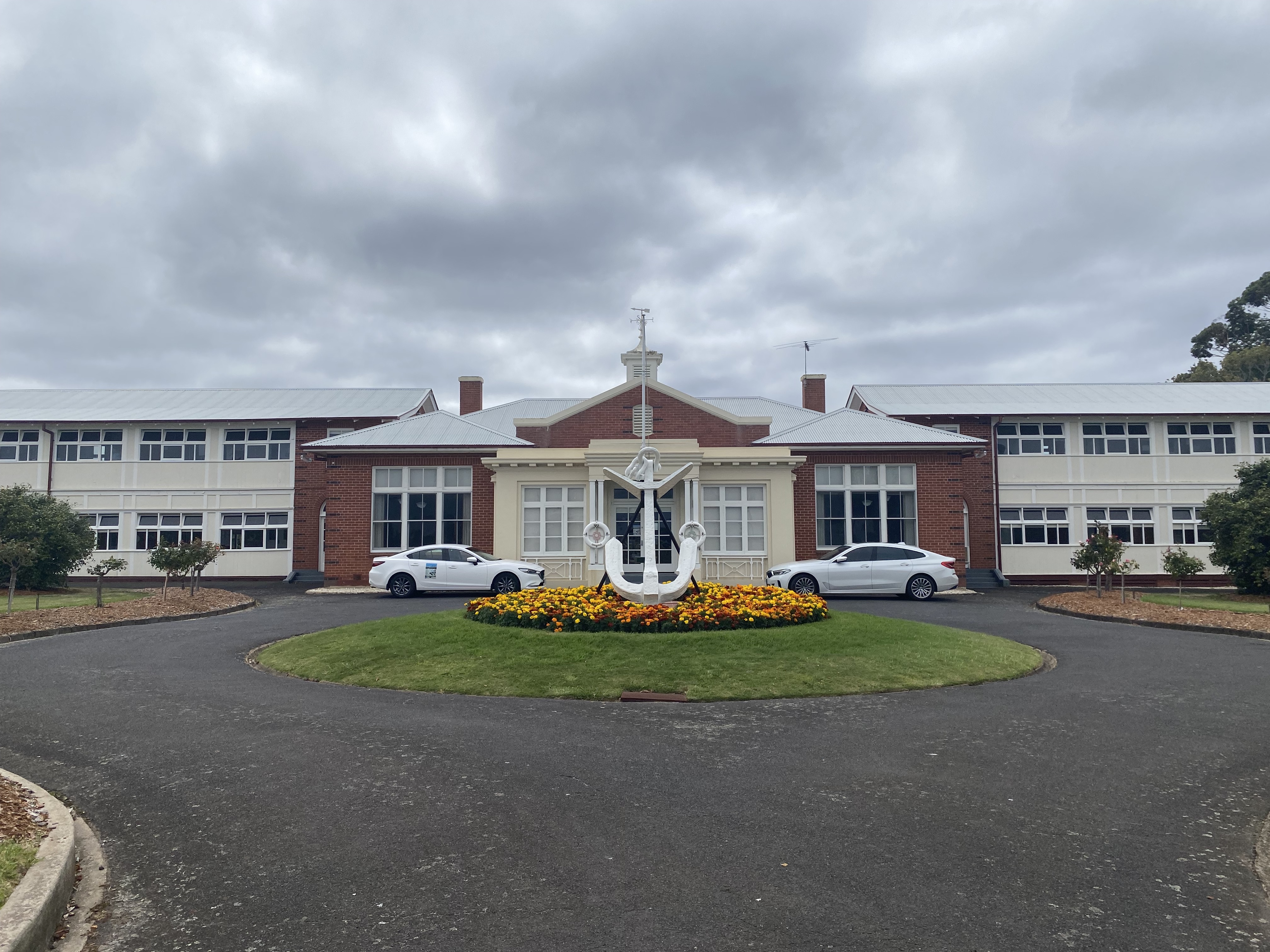

- Interactive map of HMAS Cerberus
- Coordinates: 38°22′01″S 145°11′13″E
- Country: Australia
- State: Victoria
- City: Melbourne
- LGA: Shire of Mornington Peninsula

Government
  - State electorate: Hastings
  - Federal division: Flinders
- Elevation: 13 m (43 ft)

Population
  - Total: 1,124 (2021 census)
- Postcode: 3920
- Mean max temp: 19.2 °C (66.6 °F)
- Mean min temp: 9.9 °C (49.8 °F)
- Annual rainfall: 710.8 mm (27.98 in)

HMAS Cerberus is a Royal Australian Navy (RAN) base that serves as the primary training establishment for RAN personnel. The base is located adjacent to Crib Point on the Mornington Peninsula, south of the Melbourne City Centre, Victoria, Australia. The base is also an official bounded locality of the Shire of Mornington Peninsula and is the only naval base to have a specific listing in the Australian census. HMAS Cerberus recorded a population of 1,124 at the 2021 census. A section of the base centred around the Parade Ground was added to the Australian Commonwealth Heritage List on 22 June 2004, known as the HMAS Cerberus Central Area Group.

== History ==
The site for the Cerberus naval base on Hanns Inlet, between Sandy Point and Stony Point on Western Port Bay was purchased in 1911. The 15 square kilometres (5.8 sq mi) base was opened in September 1920 and became known as Flinders Naval Depot in 1921. The Post Office opened on 2 December 1912 as Flinders Naval Base, was renamed Flinders Naval Depot in 1925 and HMAS Cerberus, Westernport in 1963. Cerberus now occupies most of Stony Point to the north and all of Sandy Point in the south.

From 1930 until 1958, Cerberus was the home of the Royal Australian Naval College, until it was clear that the base was becoming overcrowded and the College was moved back to HMAS Creswell. With the outbreak of World War II, many temporary buildings were erected to facilitate the training of wartime recruits. Many of these buildings were later demolished or replaced.

== Climate ==
HMAS Cerberus possesses an oceanic climate (Köppen: Cfb), with tepid, relatively dry summers and mild, wetter winters. Average maxima vary from 24.9 °C (76.8 °F) in February to 13.7 °C (56.7 °F) in July, while average minima fluctuate between 14.2 °C (57.6 °F) in February and 6.3 °C (43.3 °F) in July. Mean precipitation is moderately low, averaging 710.8 mm (27.98 in) per annum, but rainfall is frequent, as HMAS Cerberus receives 169.1 precipitation days annually (with a maximum frequency of rain in winter). Extreme temperatures have ranged from 45.8 °C (114.4 °F) on 7 February 2009 to −3.0 °C (26.6 °F) on 3 July 2017.

Climate data for HMAS Cerberus (38.36°S 145.18°E, 13 m AMSL) (1986-2024 normals & extremes)
Month	Jan	Feb	Mar	Apr	May	Jun	Jul	Aug	Sep	Oct	Nov	Dec	Year
Record high °C (°F)	44.1 (111.4)	45.8 (114.4)	39.9 (103.8)	34.1 (93.4)	25.6 (78.1)	21.7 (71.1)	21.9 (71.4)	25.1 (77.2)	28.9 (84.0)	34.7 (94.5)	38.8 (101.8)	42.4 (108.3)	45.8 (114.4)
Mean daily maximum °C (°F)	24.6 (76.3)	24.9 (76.8)	23.2 (73.8)	19.9 (67.8)	16.7 (62.1)	14.2 (57.6)	13.7 (56.7)	14.7 (58.5)	16.6 (61.9)	18.6 (65.5)	20.6 (69.1)	22.5 (72.5)	19.2 (66.6)
Mean daily minimum °C (°F)	14.1 (57.4)	14.2 (57.6)	12.7 (54.9)	10.0 (50.0)	8.4 (47.1)	6.8 (44.2)	6.3 (43.3)	6.7 (44.1)	7.6 (45.7)	8.9 (48.0)	10.7 (51.3)	12.0 (53.6)	9.9 (49.8)
Record low °C (°F)	5.2 (41.4)	5.0 (41.0)	2.2 (36.0)	−1.7 (28.9)	−1.1 (30.0)	−1.8 (28.8)	−3.0 (26.6)	−2.5 (27.5)	−0.3 (31.5)	−0.9 (30.4)	1.8 (35.2)	3.3 (37.9)	−3.0 (26.6)
Average precipitation mm (inches)	41.3 (1.63)	34.8 (1.37)	43.3 (1.70)	62.6 (2.46)	68.6 (2.70)	73.3 (2.89)	69.7 (2.74)	73.1 (2.88)	66.5 (2.62)	68.2 (2.69)	56.7 (2.23)	53.2 (2.09)	710.8 (27.98)
Average precipitation days (≥ 0.2 mm)	8.2	7.2	10.8	14.5	17.2	18.4	19.2	19.2	16.1	15.4	12.1	10.8	169.1
Average afternoon relative humidity (%)	58	56	57	60	68	72	69	64	63	61	62	59	62
Average dew point °C (°F)	12.5 (54.5)	12.9 (55.2)	11.5 (52.7)	9.8 (49.6)	9.1 (48.4)	7.9 (46.2)	6.8 (44.2)	6.4 (43.5)	7.3 (45.1)	8.3 (46.9)	10.3 (50.5)	11.1 (52.0)	9.5 (49.1)
Source: Bureau of Meteorology (1986-2024 normals & extremes)

== Facilities and operational units ==
The primary role of HMAS Cerberus has always been the training of RAN personnel. With the establishment of four tri-service schools over the last 13 years, this role has been extended to training Army and Air Force personnel. Specific courses offered include: the School of Survivability and Ship Safety which specialises in fire fighting, damage control and nuclear/biological/chemical defence; and seamanship and weapons training.

The base is also the home of the Recruit School – for all sailors their first contact with life in the RAN. HMAS Cerberus comprises numerous training and recreation facilities, two chapels and a small marina. Training is provided for about 6,000 personnel annually, averaging 800 trainees at any one time.

=== Training facilities ===
HMAS Cerberus currently host to the following naval training schools

- RAN Recruit School
- SSSS (School of Ship Safety and Survivability)
- Boatswains Faculty
- Defence Force School of Signals – Maritime Communications and Information Systems Wing
- Engineering Faculty
- Medical Training School
- Supply School
- Gunnery School
- Small Arms Training School
- WTSS Range
- ADF School of Physical Fitness
- ADF School of Catering
- ADF Dental School

=== Crib Point Satellite Earth Station ===
HMAS Cerberus hosts the only dedicated weather-related Satellite Earth station in Australia, founded in 1991 and operated by the Bureau of Meteorology (BoM) to service China's first Turn Around Ranging Station (C-TARS) and servicing geostationary meteorological satellites, servicing Japan's Himawari or GMS-4 and GMS-5. In August [2016], the BoM installed through a contractor Av-Comm, the first Australian ground station for the Himawari 8 weather satellite service.

=== Recruit School ===
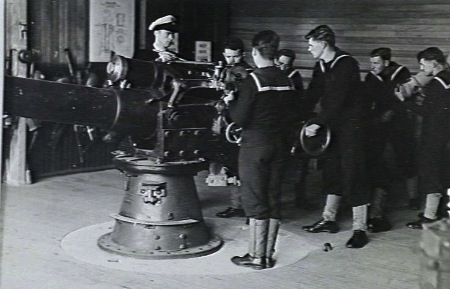
Recruits train at HMS Cerberus during World War II

The RAN recruit school is where all full-time and reserve general entry sailors complete their training. The full-time recruit course is eleven weeks in duration, and gives sailors the skills and knowledge required to conduct basic duties in the RAN, and prepare them for their specialised roles. Recruits join the RAN in monthly intakes, and these recruits are placed into one of four divisions. The recruits stay with their division for the entire eleven-week course. Some of the training and education conducted in the recruit course are:

- Teamwork exercises
- Uniform wearing and maintenance
- Drill and discipline
- First aid
- Survival at sea
- Basic ship maintenance and corrosion control
- Operation and proficiency on the service firearm, the F88 Austeyr
- Ship and sea combat survivability
- Physical training and fitness
- Basic seamanship

Part of the course includes a two-and-a-half-day sea familiarisation course.

=== Engineering Faculty ===
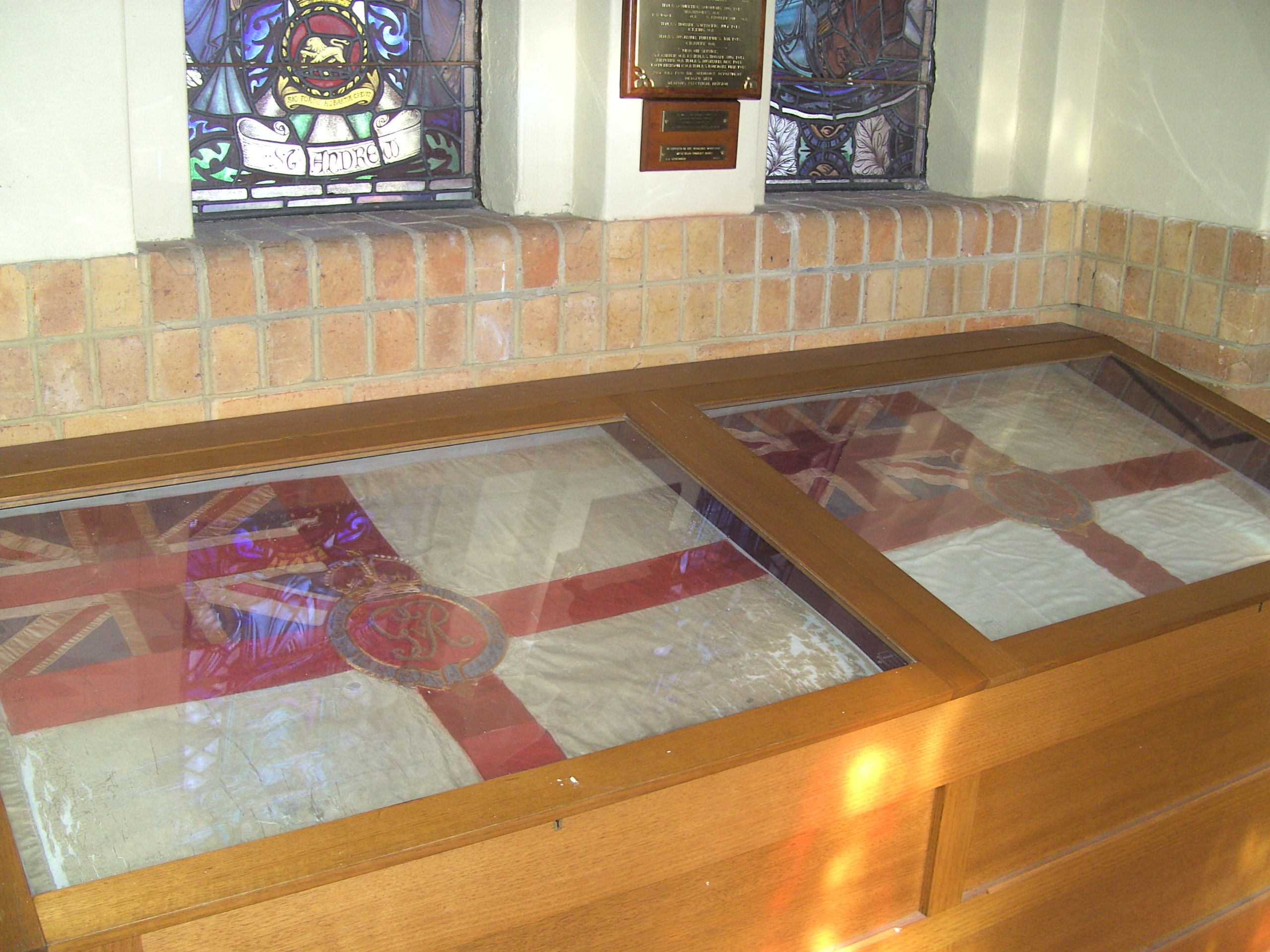
Retired colours of George V and VI.

The engineering faculty is where Marine Technicians, Electronics Technicians, Marine Engineer Officers and Electronics Engineer Officers complete their employment training.

== Sport ==
The base has an Australian Rules football team competing in the Southern Football League, as well as a hockey club competing in the Hockey Victoria competition. Golfers play at the Cerberus (HMAS Cerberus) Golf Club on Stony Point Road.

== Memorials and colours ==
Numerous memorials are at the base with many including stained glass windows in the two chapels: Our Lady of the Sea (Catholic), and St Mark's (Anglican/interdenominational). St Mark's chapel also houses retired King's/Queen's colour flags of George V, George VI, and Elizabeth II.

== See also ==
- List of Royal Australian Navy bases
