= Genome evolution in seadragons =

Leafy seadragons are widely recognized for their strikingly derived characters, including leaf-like appendages, extreme spinal curvature, elongated craniofacial bones, and large body size. These make them phenotypic outliers in the teleost fish clade (family Syngnathidae). Up until recently, the genome of leafy seadragons was unknown; but in 2022, their genome was fully annotated, along with weedy seadragons. Several significant features have been found in the leafy seadragon and weedy seadragon genomes, including divergent noncoding regions near a developmental gene responsible for integumentary growth; high genome wide repetitive DNA density; and recent transposable element expansions. Genetic diversity in leafy seadragons and weedy seadragons is relatively low as they have low-dispersal life history. Most recently, another species of seadragon was discovered and genetically sequenced: the ruby seadragon, which differs genetically and phenotypically from the two other seadragon species.

== Comparing leafy and weedy seadragon life histories ==
Seadragons are known for their remarkable derived traits, including leaf-like appendages; extreme spinal curvature (kyphosis and lordosis); elongated craniofacial bones; large body size and unique body plan; and elaborate skin coloration, presumably adapted for crypsis. They also have a toothless tubular mouth, bony armour covering the body, and an absence of pelvic fins and scales. Seadragons belong to the family Syngnathidae, a lineage of teleost fishes renowned for having evolved male pregnancy. All syngnathid fishes have evolved complex, pouch like structures that maintain homeostasis during pregnancy. Syngnathidae are found in temperate and tropical oceans, and include 321 species of seahorses, pipefishes, and seadragons. Three known species comprise the seadragon clade, including Phycodurus eques (leafy seadragon), Phyllopteryx taeniolatus (weedy, or common seadragon), and the most recently discovered, Phyllopteryx dewysea (ruby seadragon).

The southern Australian coastline changed significantly during the Last Glacial Maximum (around 20,000 years ago). Sea levels lowered 100 meters, which resulted in new continental shelves and displacement of subtidal organisms in affected areas. A land bridge, called the historical Bassian Isthmus, connected mainland Australia to Tasmania; and this caused extensive habitat changes. The seaway opened once again ca. 14,000 years ago, and is now called the Bass Strait. However, evidence of historical isolation is still present in seadragons. Populations of weedy seadragons west of the Bassian Isthmus are more diverse, while populations east of the Bassian Isthmus have low genetic diversity. During interglacial periods, postglacial flooding resulted in rising sea levels, which produced variable differences in colonizing leafy seadragon populations. In the West, populations exhibit shallow genetic structure, weak expansion signals, and a westward cline in genetic diversity, most likely because shallow seabeds did not survive the Last Glacial Maximum. This indicates that leafy seadragons recolonized the western regions following a sea level rise. In the East, shallow seabeds persisted during the Last Glacial Maximum, and increased after postglacial flooding. This resulted in strong demographic expansions, deeper genetic structure, and higher genetic diversity.

Weedy seadragons span the entire southern coast of Australia, from Western Australia to New South Wales and Tasmania; whereas leafy seadragons span a more restricted region from Western Australia to South Australia. Leafy seadragon have more elaborate appendages than the weedy seadragons. Both species exhibit low genetic diversity. Weedy seadragons are weak swimmers, so young seadragons stay close to home, hiding themselves in kelp and seaweed with crypsis. Four genetically distinct populations are recognized in weedy seadragons, in central New South Wales, southern New South Wales, Victoria, and Tasmania. Similarly, leafy seadragons have a low dispersal life history. Males brood eggs on the underside of their tails, which prohibits a dispersive egg or larval phase. Additionally, adult leafy seadragons are slow swimmers; therefore, they tend to stick close to home. They occur in two genetically distinct populations, one in the Western part of their range and the other on the Southern part of their range.

== Comparing leafy and weedy seadragon genomes ==
Both weedy and leafy seadragons exhibit genomic features that help explain their unusual phenotypic traits, including highly repetitive DNA sequences for their size. Transposable elements accumulate nucleotide substitutions over evolutionary time, and are prone to genetic rearrangements. Often, transposable elements have significant mutational effects on their hosts, some even contributing to organismic evolution. Transposable element density is enriched near expanded gene families, and low near contracted gene families. For example, BovB and Tc1 transposable elements are enriched near a copy number expansion of Copb2, a coatamer complex gene that forms part of a protein complex involved in retrograde vesicle budding from the Golgi apparatus. It is also important for secretion of macromolecule cargo, like collagen, which is important for bone and connective tissue development. Weedy and leafy seadragons have elaborated bony exoskeletons, stiff bodies, connective tissue dense leafy-like appendages, and kinked axial skeletons, likely as a result of Copb2 proliferation.

Another gene family influenced by transposable elements is the fgf family. Fgf3 and Fgf4 are lost in weedy and leafy seadragons, which is shocking considering their importance in pharyngeal arches, teeth, brain, cranial placodes, epidermal appendages, limbs, and segmental axis development. Specifically in weedy seadragons, the secretory calcium-binding phosphoprotein 5 is missing, which is essential for oral and pharyngeal teeth. Evolutionary loss of these genes could have led to their strange craniofacial features.

Specifically in weedy seadragons, 433 genes are highly expressed in the leaf-like appendages. Though they look like fins, they lack fin rays and are mostly bone matrix and connective tissue. Of these genes, 20 of them include genes that likely provide strength and elasticity (like collagens, osteocalcin, and keratins), in additions to genes related to immune response (like lectins, B2-macroglobulin, and apolipoprotein E). It's thought that these genes were evolved to help protect their accident-prone leaf-like appendages. Several inflammation and injury repair genes, like tnfrsfs, chemokines, chemokine receptors, and protocadherins, are highly expressed in the appendages, suggesting that these genes could help the leaf-like appendages heal and regenerate after predator attacks. Another gene expansion is MHC I, which is highly expressed in the leaf-like appendages, skin, and gills. It is suggested that MHC I might provide additional immune protection.

In both weedy and leafy seadragons, GTPase of the immunity-associated protein genes is another contracted gene family. It is thought that contraction of this family could promote immunologic tolerance in embryos, before they develop their own adaptive immune system.

== Ruby seadragon genome ==
The most recently discovered species is the ruby seadragon, whose morphological features distinguish it from the other two species. It is red in color, with pink vertical bars that extend halfway it its body. This uniform color differs from weedy and leafy seadragons, which are multicolored and blotchy. It is thought that in low light depths, cryptic red coloration is an efficient camouflage strategy. Its body shape is reminiscent of the weedy seadragon, but not of the leafy seadragon. It has an enlarge pectoral area, even larger than weedy seadragons; and has 18 trunk vertebrae instead of 17-18 in leafy seadragons and 17 in weedy seadragons. Additionally, the new species has a forward pointing pair of dorsal spines in contrast to the backwards facing pair in leafy and weedy seadragons.

Ruby seadragons possess enlarged bony spines to which leafy appendages would attach in weedy and leafy seadragons, but the appendages themselves are absent. It is thought that appendages would serve very little camouflaging purpose and would ultimately cause drag or fluid resistance. Ruby seadragon also have prehensile tails, while leafy seadragons and weedy seadragons lack these tails. One explanation is that this absence in the leafy weedy seadragons evolved in each species independently, and that the prehensile tail in the ruby seadragon was maintained from a common ancestor of Syngnathidae. Another explanation could be that the common ancestor of all seadragons lost their prehensile tail, and the ruby seadragon re-acquired a prehensile tail. Ultimately, these phenotypic differences could be due to genetic divergences in mitochondrial and nuclear sequences between this newly discovered species and the other two species.
