= Flinders, Victoria =

Flinders
- Town
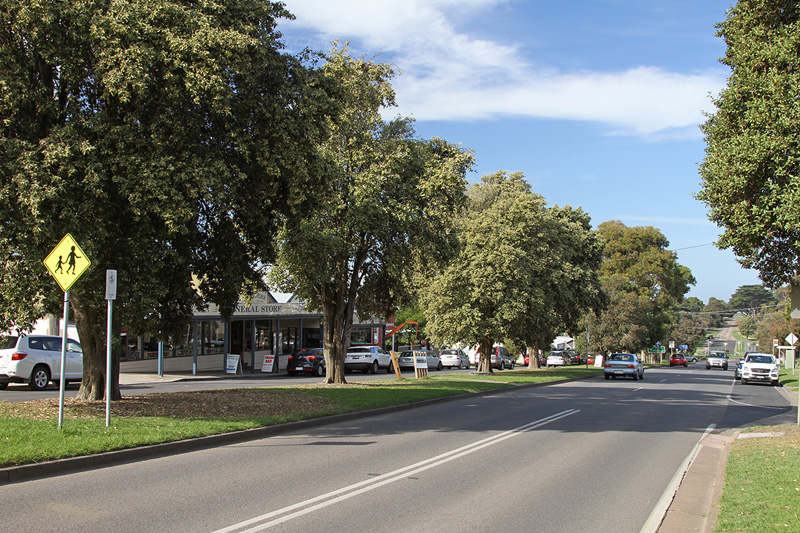
- Cook Street, the main street

- Interactive map of Flinders
- Coordinates: 38.474°S 145.022°E
- Country: Australia
- State: Victoria
- LGA: Shire of Mornington Peninsula
- Location: 104 km (65 mi) from Melbourne; 23 km (14 mi) from Rosebud
- Established: 1854

Government
  - State electorate: Nepean
  - Federal division: Flinders

Population
  - Total: 1,130 (2021 census)
- Postcode: 3929
Localities around Flinders
Boneo	Main Ridge	Red Hill
Boneo	Flinders	Shoreham
Western Port	Western Port	Western Port

Flinders is a seaside town on the Mornington Peninsula in Melbourne, Victoria, Australia, 73 km (45 mi) south of Melbourne's Central Business District, located within the Shire of Mornington Peninsula local government area. Flinders recorded a population of 1,130 at the 2021 census.

Flinders is located at the point where Western Port meets Bass Strait.

== History ==
The town was named by George Bass after his friend, the explorer and British naval officer Matthew Flinders. Settlement commenced in 1854 and many pioneers and settlers are buried at the Flinders cemetery. Flinders Post Office opened on 7 March 1863 as the population grew.

Flinders was once believed to have previously been known as Mendi-Moke, but this was subsequently been denied.

=== Heritage listing ===
The following place in Flinders is listed on the Victorian Heritage Register:

- Flinders Pier, incorporating the Telegraph Cable Complex and former Jetty Cargo Shed, at The Esplanade and on the Foreshore

== Present day ==
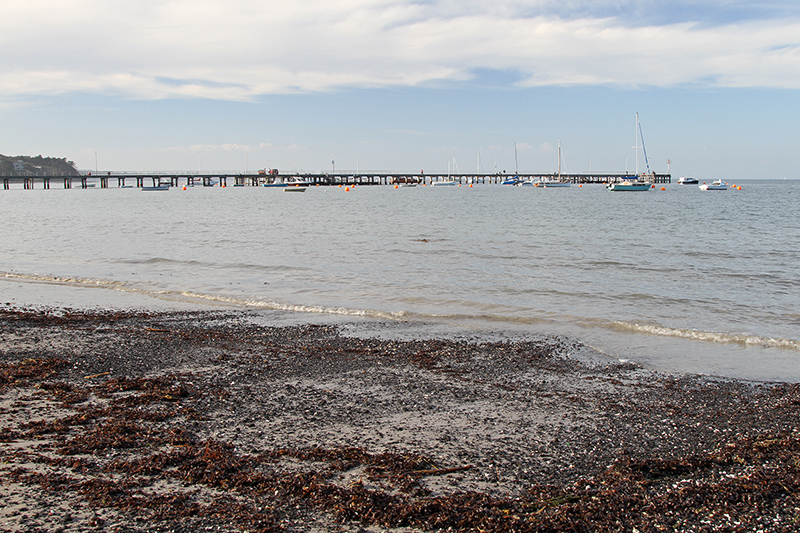
The sheltered beach and 250 m-long (820 ft) pier

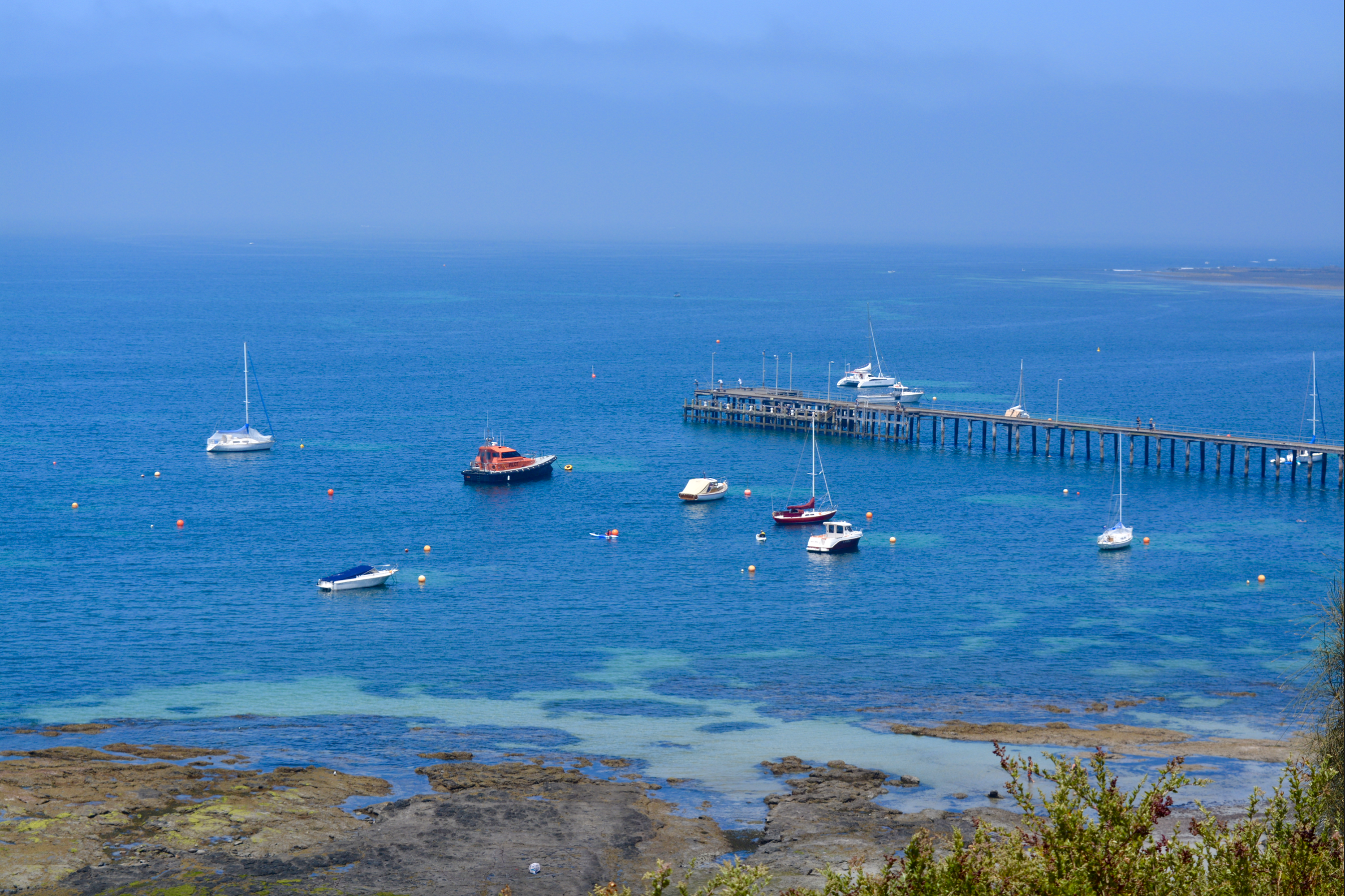
Boats moored off Flinders

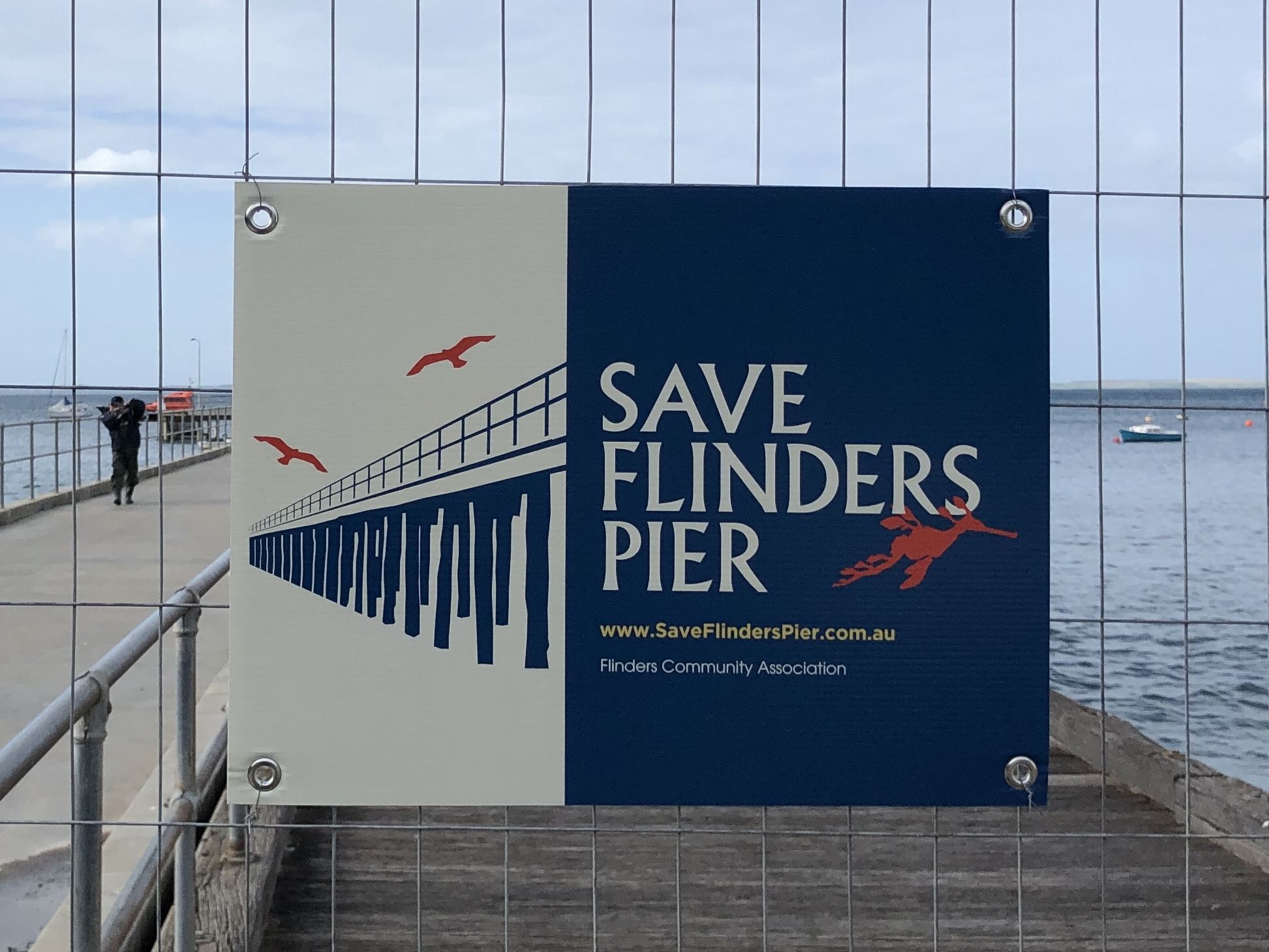
Save Flinders Pier signage

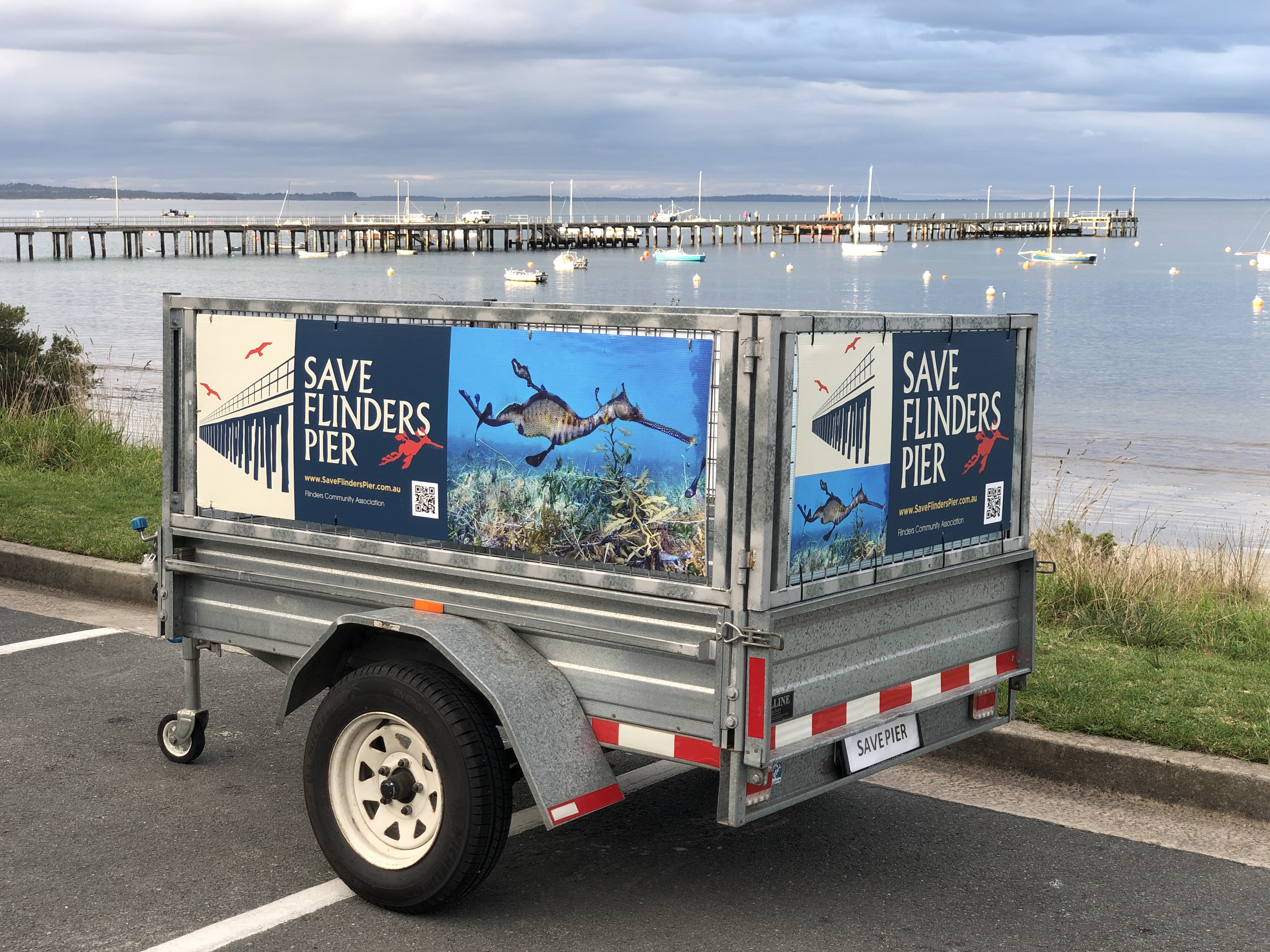
'Weedy Trailer' at Flinders Pier

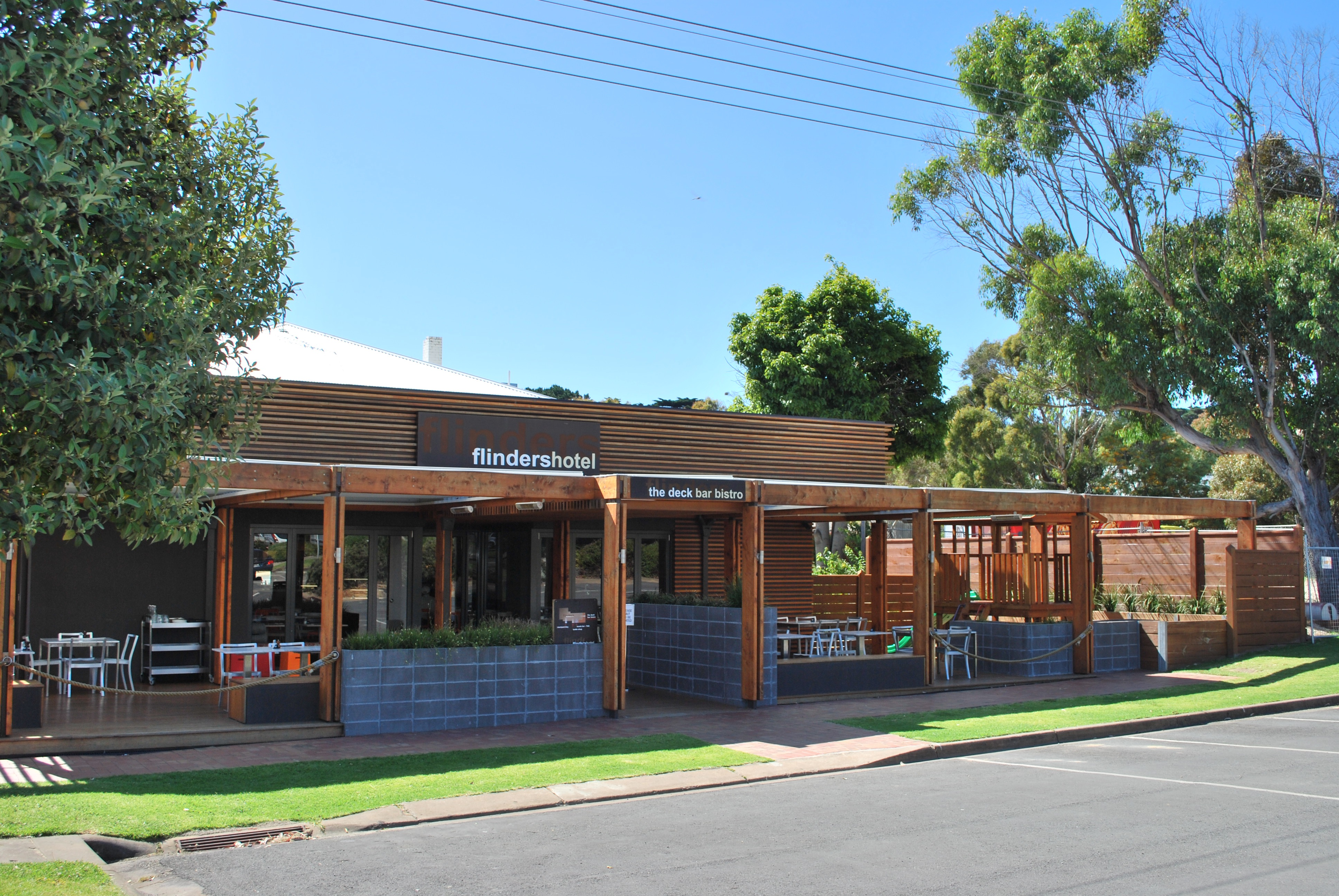
Flinders Hotel

Features of the town include the Flinders Golf Club, a picturesque golf course built on a cliff top, a recreation reserve, a small yacht club, and a 250 metres (820 ft) long pier out from the protected beach, sheltered from the waters of Bass Strait by West Head. This area is popular for sailing, fishing, and other watersports.

On the southern side of West Head, the ocean breaks over the basalt rocks of Mushroom Reef Marine Sanctuary at Flinders ocean beach. Mushroom Reef hosts one of Victoria's best intertidal and subtidal rock platform reefs, popular for beachcombing, recreational diving, snorkelling, and surfing. Several accommodation options exist, including B&Bs and hotel-motel style accommodation. Shopping and a mobile library are also available to tourists and residents.

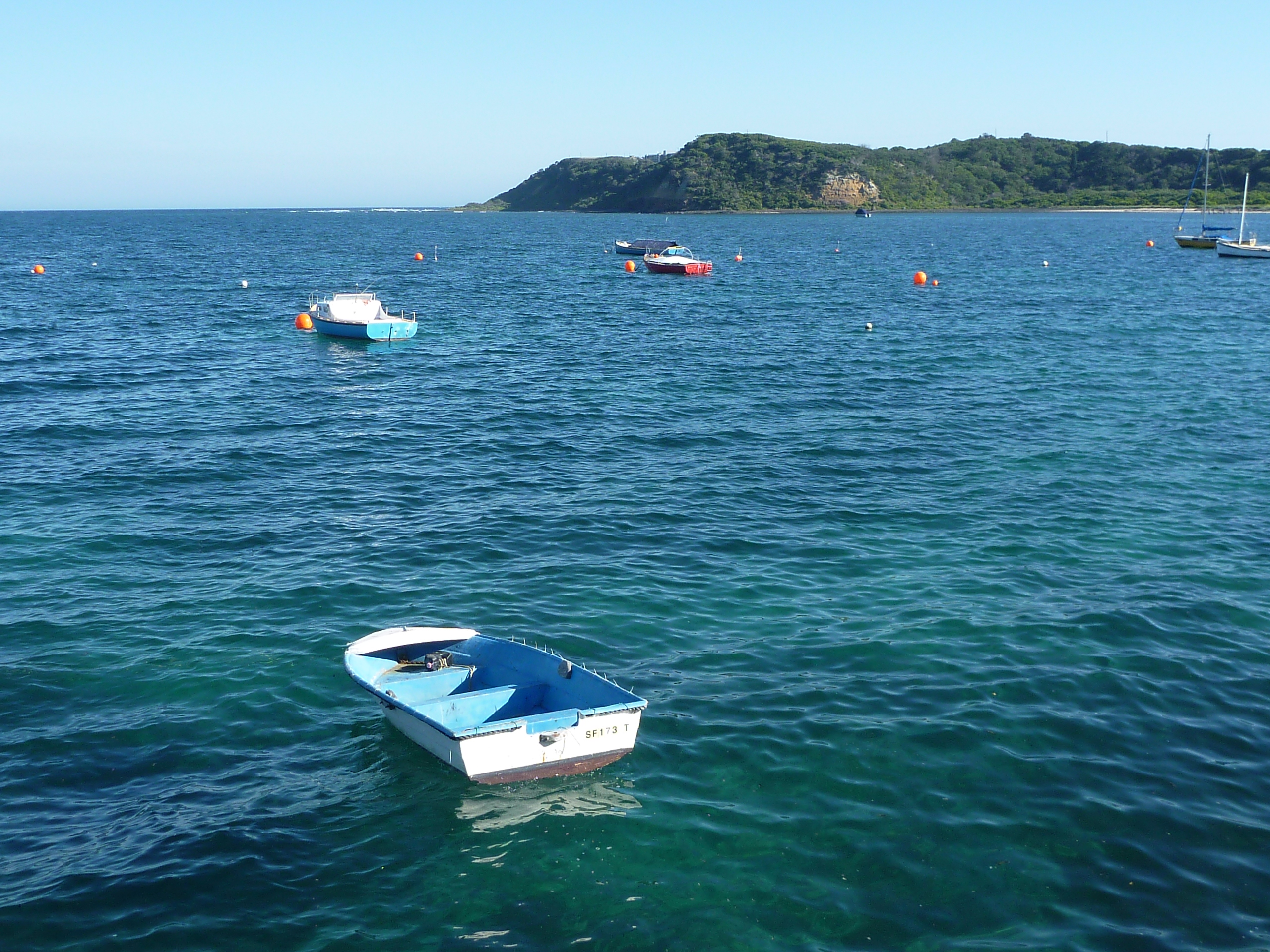
Flinders Boats

Flinders was the original home of Flinders Bread, available throughout Melbourne and the Mornington Peninsula. The company's operations are now based in Dandenong, but the bread is still available locally.

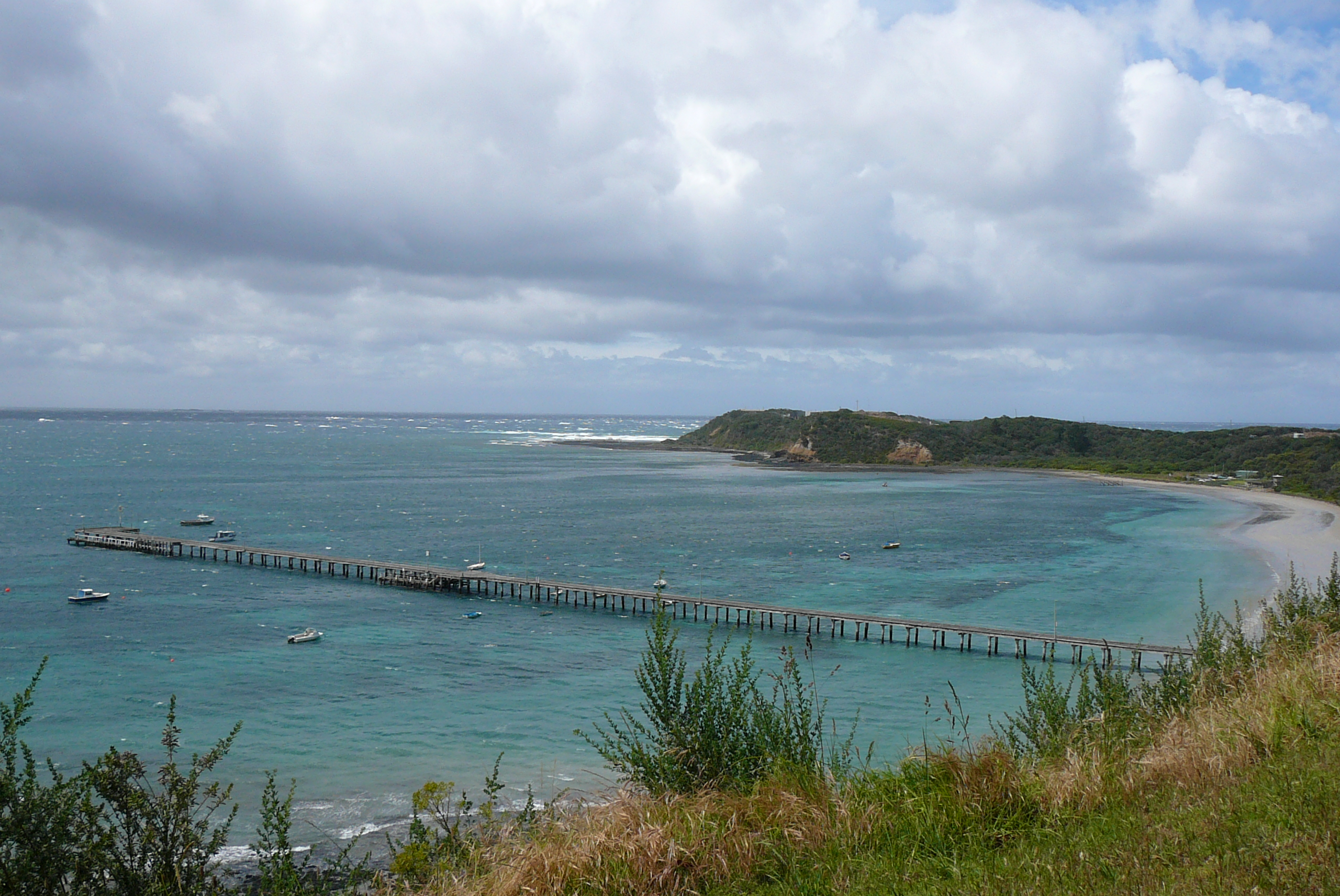
Flinders Pier

The Royal Australian Navy operate a weapons training facility and gunnery on West Head, with public access to this area being restricted.

Flinders is served by bus route 782 from Frankston, operated by Ventura Bus Lines.

Flinders Pier is popular for recreational scuba diving activities. It is home to the spectacular weedy sea dragon, as well as many other marine species including cuttlefish, large smooth rays and eagle rays, crabs and many other species.

== Flinders Pier ==
The Flinders Pier is a 327-metre-long (1,073 ft) timber-piled pier and an adjacent 180-metre-long (591 ft) steel pier, located on the foreshore at the eastern terminus of The Esplanade, in Kennon Cove, Flinders. The pier was erected from c. 1864 and supported the development of the fishing industry and enabled the provision of supplies to the Mornington Peninsula, prior to the reliable development of the motor vehicle and road transport. The timber pier and its associated telecommunications infrastructure were added to the Victorian Heritage Register on 25 March 1992 in recognition of their historical, archaeological, scientific, and social significance.

Initially maintained by the various local government authorities, Parks Victoria became the responsible administration authority and determined, in the early 2000s that the pier was unsafe, due to damage to the timber piles. Between 2011 and 2013, a concrete jetty was built by Parks Victoria on steel piles, alongside the north-side of the wooden pier, to allow heavy vehicles to provide fuel to commercial boats. In April 2020, a 180-metre-long (591 ft) section of the timber pier was closed due to safety concerns about the timber structure, with 54 supporting timber piles in need of replacement. These actions were taken in advance of the listing of the pier on the Victorian Heritage Register in 2022.

On 21 July 2020, during the peak of COVID-19 lockdowns in Victoria, the Victorian Government Minister for Ports and Freight, Melissa Horne, announced the planned demolition of the inner section of the timber pier. The announcement went unreported at the time. The community was alerted on 17 March 2021 in an email from Mornington Shire local Councillor David Gill, who outlined the threat to the pier, leading to the discovery of the Minister's unreported media announcement. A study into the proposed plans for the pier removal was published in May 2021.

However, it was claimed that the removal of the wooden pylons would take away a food source for the iconic weedy sea dragon and other fish. A community-driven campaign to restore the damaged timber attracted the support of Sir David Attenborough. Estimated to cost between A$3 to 5.5 million to repair, by March 2025, the Victorian Government had committed to provide $1.53 million towards the restoration work; and the pier was included in another announcement by Horne in November 2025, that $18 million would be invested to restore some of the state’s most historic piers. As of June 2026, the restoration project had stalled due to the high cost, with calls on the Government to confirm funding for completion of the restoration project.

== Population ==
In the 2016 Census, there were 905 people in Flinders. 82.1% of people were born in Australia and 91.4% of people spoke only English at home. The most common responses for religion were No Religion 41.0%, Anglican 23.5% and Catholic 12.6%.

== See also ==
- Shire of Flinders – Flinders was previously within this former local government area.
