= Flinders Pier =

Heritage-listed pier in Melbourne, Victoria, Australia

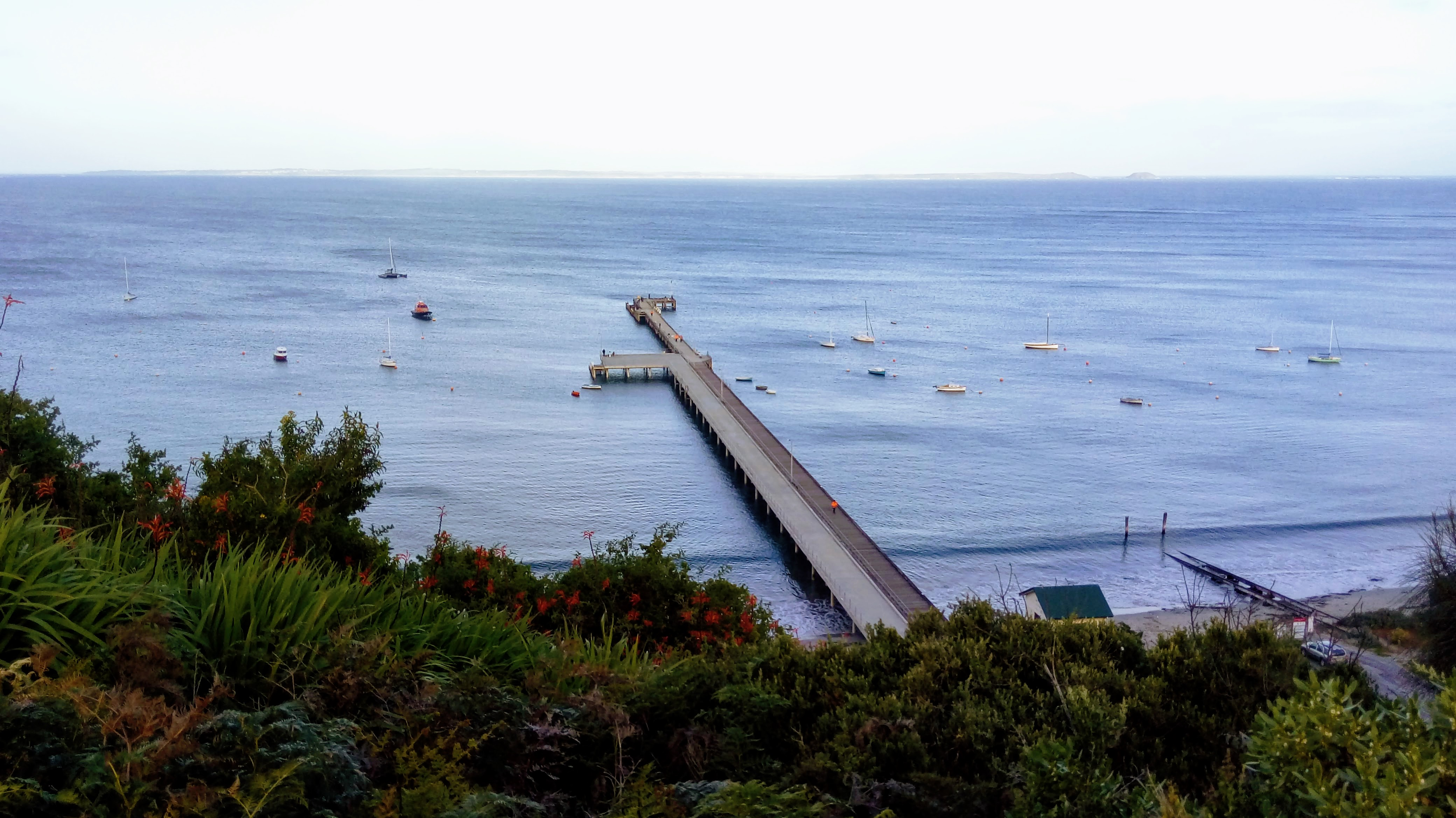
- The pier, viewed from the clifftop, in 2017. Associated infrastructure, including the cargo shed, can be seen in the foreground.

- Location of the pier in Greater Metropolitan Melbourne
- Interactive map of the Flinders Pier area
- Alternative names: Flinders Jetty; Flinders Telegraph Cable Complex; Flinders Jetty Cargo Shed

General information
- Status: Completed; Sections closed; Partial restoration commenced
- Type: Pier and associated telegraph cable infrastructure
- Location: The Esplanade, Flinders, Mornington Peninsula, Melbourne, Victoria, Australia
- Coordinates: 38°28′31″S 145°01′31″E
- Completed: 1864; 162 years ago
- Operator: Parks Victoria (maintenance)

Dimensions
- Other dimensions: 327 m (1,073 ft) (length)

Technical details
- Structural system: Timber pilings
- Material: timber; corrugated iron; steel and concrete (2013 pier)

Website
- parks.vic.gov.au

Victorian Heritage Register
- Official name: Flinders Telegraph Cable Complex and Pier
- Type: Registered place
- Criteria: A, D, G
- Delisted: 20 October 2022
- Reference no.: H2413
- Categories: Exploration, Survey and Events; Postal and Telecommunications; Monuments and Memorials; Transport - Water; Landscape - Natural; Science

Victorian Heritage Register
- Official name: Jetty Cargo Shed (former)
- Type: Registered place
- Designated: 25 March 1992
- Reference no.: H0906
- Heritage overlay no.: HO81
- Category: Transport - Water

Register of the National Estate
- Official name: Flinders Pier, Foreshore & Cable Station Precinct
- Type: Defunct register
- Designated: undated
- Reference no.: 102932

Register of the National Estate
- Official name: Flinders Jetty and Shed
- Type: Defunct register
- Designated: undated
- Reference no.: 102972

The Flinders Pier, also known as the Flinders Jetty, is a 327-metre-long (1,073 ft) timber-piled pier, an adjacent 180-metre-long (591 ft) steel and concrete pier, and associated telegraph cable and storage infrastructure, located at the eastern terminus of The Esplanade, on the foreshore, in Flinders, on the Mornington Peninsula, in the south eastern suburbs of Melbourne, in Victoria, Australia.

Built from 1864, on the traditional lands of the Bunurong people, the timber pier and its associated telecommunications and storage infrastructure were added to the Victorian Heritage Register, in two separate listings, on 25 March 1992 and 20 October 2022 in recognition of their historical, archaeological, scientific, and social significance; and, on unknown dates, were also added to non-statutory lists by the Victorian branch of the National Trust and the now defunct Register of the National Estate.

An adjacent pier comprising steel piles and a concrete deck was added parallel to the inner length of the pier in c. 2013 due to the deterioration of the timber pier, parts of which were closed to public access since April 2020, due to damaged timber piles. A community-driven campaign led to the heritage listing of the timber pier, and the announcement of government grants to restore the pier, with works commenced in 2025, yet stalled a year later.

== History ==
The first telegraph cable in Victoria was installed in c. 1854, revolutionising communication. People no longer had to wait months for letters sent by ship.

The land along the Flinders foreshore between the pier and West Head which was first used for market gardening, and parts were leased by fishing families where they built their homes. The first market gardeners were said to be the Chinese who probably came from the goldfields in the 1860s. Fishing was important in the early development of Flinders. Fishing families such as Lucas and Dunne built houses here around 1880; the Finnerty and Chidgey families followed, and a fourth house was built here by Jack Mannix around 1920. The site was ideal for those engaged in fishing, with easy access to their fishing boats and control over their stock of crayfish kept in floating crates. The two sheds at the pier have been used for fishing purposes and selling of the catch. The fishing families' houses were demolished in 1940.

Laying of the cable commenced in April 1869 and on 1 May 1869, the first submarine telegraph cable between Tasmania and Victoria was completed, officially commemorated by the Governor of Victoria, Sir Henry Manners-Sutton, exchanging greetings with the Governor of Tasmania, Charles Du Cane, sent in Morse code. It was the second attempt to lay an undersea cable across Bass Strait, after the first attempt in 1859 failed after two years. This successful attempt, by the Victorian and Tasmanian Submarine Cable Company, became the location of an important communication link connecting Tasmania, Victoria and other parts of the colony to London.

Operating the telegraph was an important local activity, requiring the building of a government telegraph office, a substantial stone and brick building (c. 1869) and a staff house, known as Happy Valley (c. 1869) half way up the cliff. The Morse code messages were received in a small receiving hut on the beach and decoded by hand, the message being carried to the Staff & Operations house, and then on to the government telegraph office. As the technology advanced, different buildings were developed and functions changed. Most buildings found other uses, often for some years, but virtually all have now been demolished. A postcard of 1905 shows the pier and shed, the foreshore buildings associated with the cable station, and in the distance towards West Head, houses set amongst the tea tree. While many of these buildings have been removed, the visual qualities and character remains.

The first pier was built in 1870 by Williams, who also built the Hastings jetty. The pier enabled supplies to be more easily delivered to the town, and provided local farmers with better access to the Melbourne market than did road transport. A variety of goods were shipped out from Flinders Pier (including onions, sleepers from Shoreham, bacon and dairy produce). A shed was built at the same time as the pier to store goods.

== Description ==
The site comprises two timber storage sheds - the original jetty cargo shed and a later shed - and the timber pier. The jetty cargo shed was relocated from the position now occupied by the later shed.

The pier is located in Kennon Cove, at Flinders, chosen because of its calm and sandy conditions. The cable buildings included huts on the beach and a cable station on the headland. Only the underground archaeology remains. Road access to Flinders was difficult during the early years of the township; a pier made the shipping of goods in and out of the township practicable. The availability of the pier enabled shipping of local produce - onions, sleepers, bacon and dairy products - to the Melbourne markets. The pier is of timber pile construction, with a timber deck. It was originally built in 1870, and was apparently substantially reconstructed in the 1960s. A short section of sea wall along the foreshore next to the pier is faced with Dromana granite set in 'crazy paving' pattern.

Evidence of the telegraph complex survives in the pier and exotic plantings and in archaeological remains from between 1869 and the 1940s, including the first of three cable station buildings at Flinders, staff residences, and workshops; three cable test houses and one repeater station, as well as buried telegraph cables and cable trenches under the land and the seabed surrounding the pier and associated archaeological deposits. Flinders Pier was constructed in timber from 1864, and the complex includes the submerged remains of a demolished breakwater, the fishing shed (which may be a relocated goods shed/kiosk), and the cargo shed.

The Flinders Pier is socially significant to the community that has grown around the scientific study and popular observation of the Victorian Common or Weedy Seadragon, Phyllopteryx taeniolatus. The pier has been a focus of accelerating levels of activity related to the study and observation of seadragons since at least the 1970s. There is a resonance to this attachment, both because of the high profile and popular appeal of the seadragon and because of the widespread attachment of the community who are drawn to this location.

The former Jetty Cargo Shed (built c. 1871; it is likely that Williams was also the contractor) is a small number bow roof structure which were commonly utilised for port structures. The shed was relocated one chain west of its original location and it remains relatively intact and is in an appropriate foreshore location. The shed, in conjunction with the nearby pier, is a strong visual reminder of the former dominance of sea transport for moving heavy cargoes to isolated coastal settlements. Provides an example of the use of corrugated iron for roofing purposes which utilises the properties of the material to provide a durable, strong roof, with minimal roof openings, was easily transportable, and required minimum support when curved.

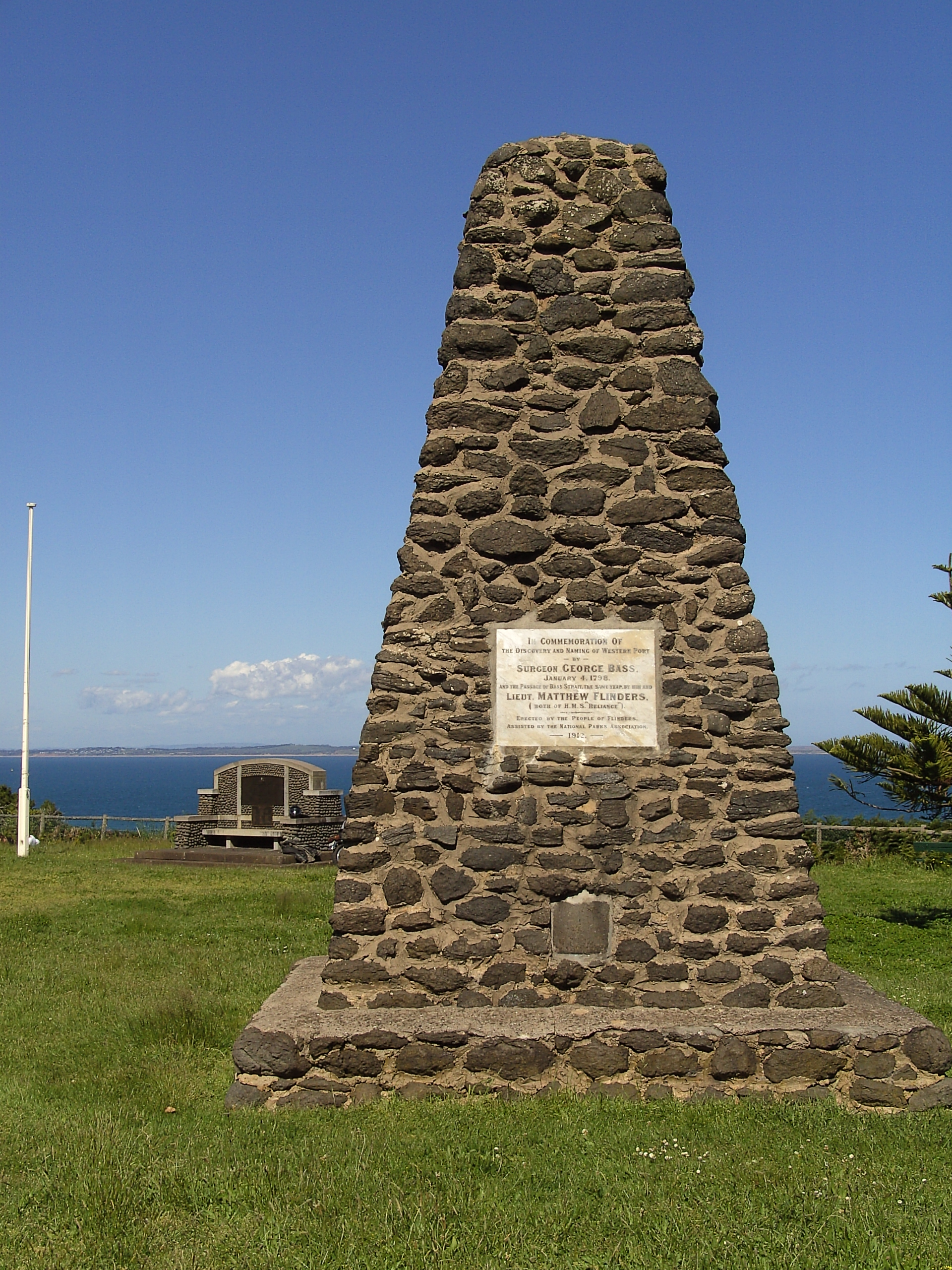
The Bass–Flinders memorial cairn, 2010

The precinct consists of two sections - the cliff-top cable station site and the foreshore. The cable came ashore in the vicinity of the Flinders pier and a telegraph station was located at the end of Cook Street overlooking the jetty. A small section of land line connected the cable to the existing telegraph line at Cape Schanck. The cable station site, marked by several large trees and other garden plantings, is a key element in the view east from the town centre to the coast. A monument was dedicated on 1 May 1993 to commemorate the laying of the submarine telegraph cable across Bass Strait in 1869. The footings of the cable station are clearly visible. The cliff-top area also contains a memorial to George Bass and Matthew Flinders, a large stone cairn built in c. 1912 in commemoration, sponsored by the Education Department. There is also a war memorial, appropriately built in the form of a seat, facing away from the sea and towards the town.

On the foreshore, a park has been created where the houses of local fishing families once stood. The pier and sheds are key elements. The view from the pier towards the cable station site clearly reveals the line of the track up to the site of Happy Valley, a variety of exotic plants, with the dark foliage of the cypresses along the eastern end of Cook Street forming a backdrop. Evidence of this path remains.

Cargoes were off-loaded from trading vessels on to substantial trolleys running on rails to the shore end of the jetty. A door into the original cargo shed enabled direct access from the pier, and another door access to the roadway for loading or unloading to horse-drawn vehicles. Two other sheds were built to serve as additional storage sheds on the pier. One has since been demolished, and the other (apparently dating from the 1920s) remains. The pier and sheds also served the fishing industry over the years, with one shed (probably the one since demolished) used by a fisherman's wife to sell crayfish. The sheds, pier and foreshore at Flinders contains evidence of the fishing industry and the development of the telegraph station. This place is within the Flinders Pier, Foreshore and Cable Station Precinct.

The original drawing for the jetty cargo shed shows a curved roof shed, clad in weather-boards, with gable vents and a double roller gate at one end. A postcard dating from 1905 shows the building in its original position with a double door on the pier side in the position of the present door, and a door on the roadside (on the end of the building). The end entry has been boarded over, but otherwise the external form of the building remains largely intact. Internally the building had a timber decking floor and a timber pile substructure which has now been replaced with a concrete floor.

The later shed, believed to date from the 1920s, is also of timber-frame construction with a gable roof. It rests on a base of dressed Dromana granite which forms part of a small section of 'sea wall' next to the pier.

=== Proposed restoration ===
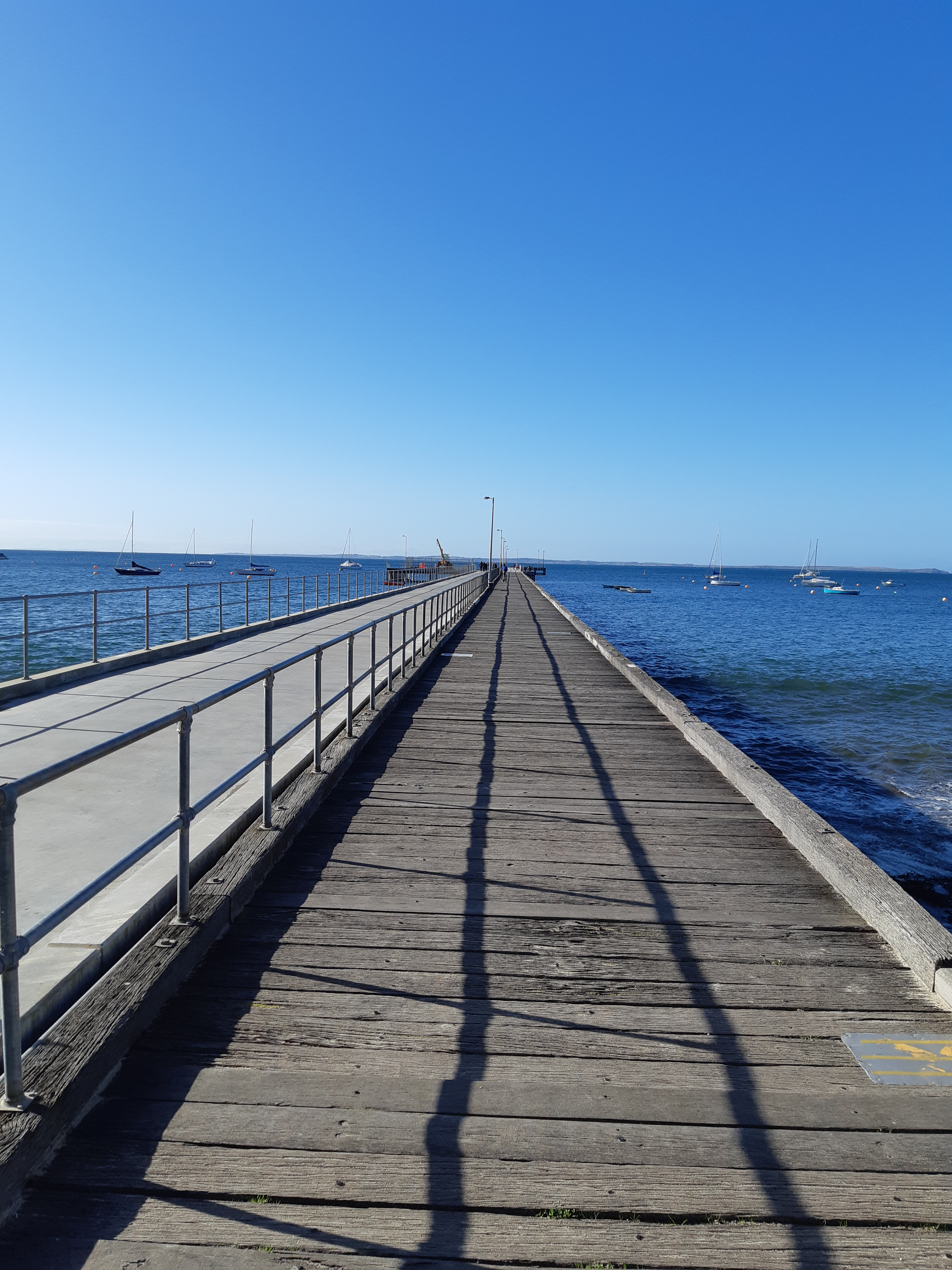
Detail of the timber pier, 2019

Between 2011 and 2013, a concrete jetty, built on steel piles, was built alongside the north-side of the wooden pier, to allow heavy vehicles to provide fuel to commercial boats. A 180-metre-long (591 ft) section of the timber pier has remained closed since April 2020, due to safety concerns about the timber structure, with 54 supporting timber piles in need of replacement. These actions were taken in advance of the listing of the pier on the Victorian Heritage Register in 2022.

On 21 July 2020, during the peak of COVID-19 lockdowns in Victoria, the Victorian Government Minister for Ports and Freight, Melissa Horne, announced the planned demolition of the inner section of the timber pier. The announcement went unreported at the time. The community was alerted on 17 March 2021 in an email from Mornington Shire local Councillor David Gill, who outlined the threat to the pier, leading to the discovery of the Minister's unreported media announcement. A study into the proposed plans for the removal of 180 metres (590 ft) of the timber pier was published in May 2021.

On 8 May 2021, the Flinders Community Association held a public meeting attended by 300 people and the Save Flinders Pier campaign was formed. Concern was raised that the partial removal of the timber pier would eventually lead to the full removal, given the age of the whole structure; the possible impact on the habitat of the Weedy Sea Dragon; and the potential loss of an historic maritime artefact. An online petition attached 42,000 signatories and approximately $40,000 was raised in donations; while a petition in village shops recorded a further 2,800 signatories. The community-driven campaign to restore the damaged timber pier attracted the support of Sir David Attenborough, who supported claims that the removal of the wooden pylons would take away a food source for the iconic weedy sea dragon and other fish.

Local campaigns mobilised and the Flinders District Historical Society nominated the pier precinct to be added to the Victorian Heritage Register; followed with a letter from the campaign chair to all members of the Victorian Parliament, requesting action be taken to stop the planned demolition; and the Shire Council voting in support of saving the pier, observing that "the Flinders Pier holds significant historical, social, aesthetic, and environmental values and attracts beneficial tourism to the Western Port region." A report prepared by the Flinders Community Association claimed that despite various reports on the condition of the pier, that Parks Victoria failed to maintain the timber pier in a fit and proper manner.

Heritage Victoria completed an assessment of the pier and its associated telecommunications infrastructure and recommended to the Heritage Council of Victoria that the timber pier and precinct be added to the Victorian Heritage Register; that was approved by the Council on 20 October 2022; announcing its determination a few days earlier. The Heritage Council decision provided formal protection of the pier, ensuring that demolition was now highly unlikely.

Cathrine Burnett-Wake, a member of the Victorian Legislative Council for the Eastern Victoria Region, representing the Victorian branch of the Liberal Party requested funding be directed to the repair and restoration of the timber pier. Minister Horne replied, "The intent was never to retain a parallel inner structure (of Flinders Pier) beyond the end of its economic life."

In the Victorian Government budget for 2022–2023, it was announced that "…funding is provided to undertake critical works on.... the Old Flinders Jetty." Labor's Chris Brayne MP, the member for Nepean, said that the Government would commit A$1.5 million for planning and restoration works. Brayne's opponent, Sam Groth, made an election pledge in September 2022 of $3.5 million to restore the pier. On 22 December 2022, Parks Victoria issued an update on the project with information that it commenced the initial planning, design options and permit stages for repairing the pier. The Flinders Foreshore Precinct Conservation Management Plan was approved by the Shire Council in September 2023.

Estimated to cost between $3–5.5 million to repair, by March 2025, the Victorian Government had committed to provide $1.53 million towards the restoration work; and the pier was included in a November 2025 announcement by Minister Horne that $18 million would be invested to restore some of the state's most historic piers. As of June 2026, the restoration project had stalled due to the high cost, with calls on the Government to confirm funding for completion of the restoration project.

== See also ==
- Architecture of Melbourne
- List of domestic submarine communications cables
- List of places on the Victorian Heritage Register in the Shire of Mornington Peninsula
