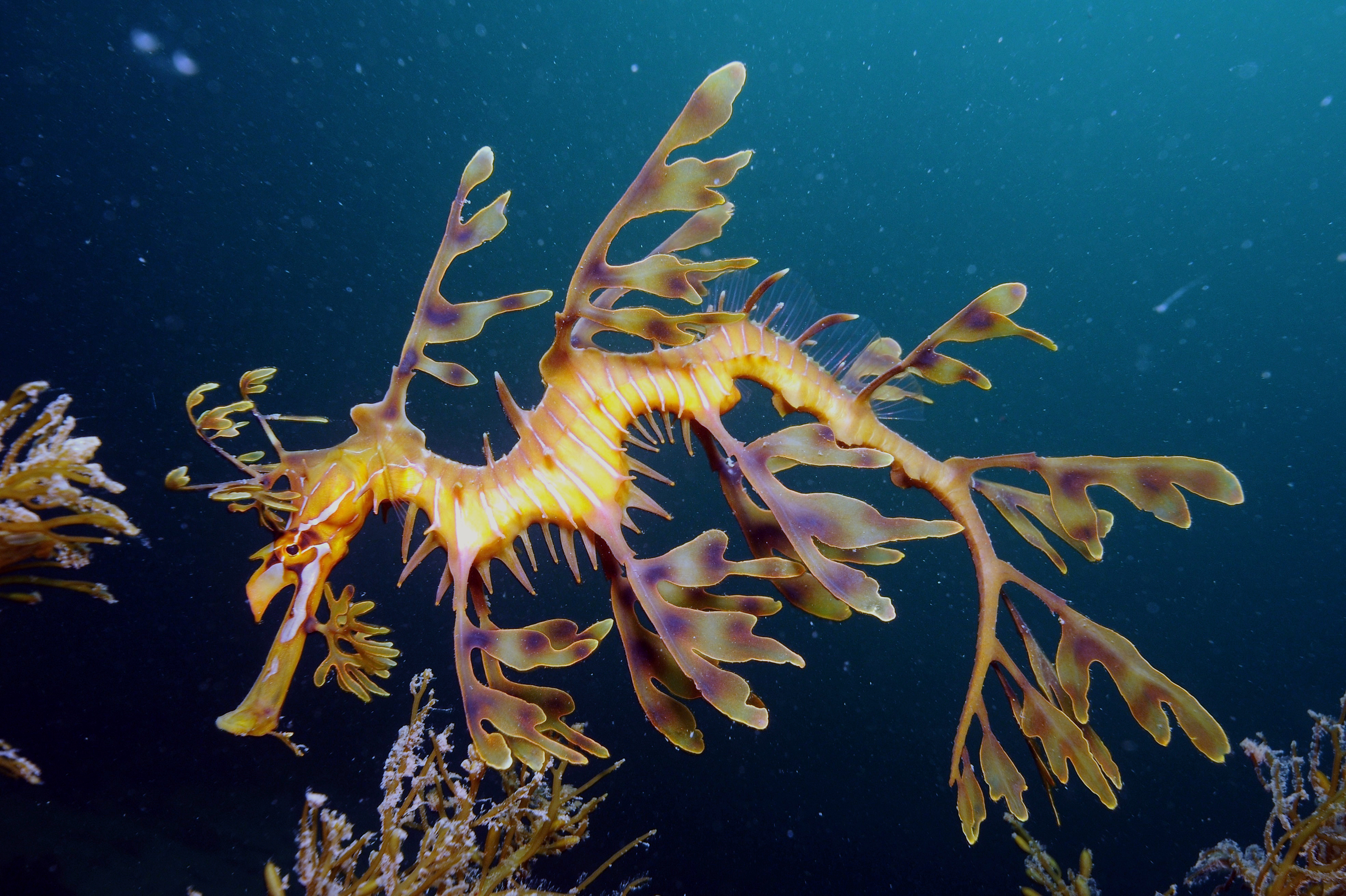
- Off Kangaroo Island, Australia

Conservation status
- Least Concern (IUCN 3.1)

Scientific classification
- Kingdom: Animalia
- Phylum: Chordata
- Class: Actinopterygii
- Division: Teleostei
- Order: Syngnathiformes
- Family: Syngnathidae
- Subfamily: Syngnathinae
- Genus: Phycodurus; T. N. Gill, 1896
- Species: P. eques

Binomial name
- Phycodurus eques (Günther, 1865)
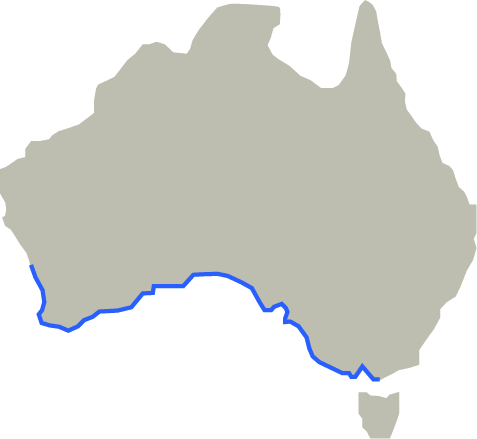
- Phycodurus eques range

Synonyms
- Phycodurus glauerti Whitley, 1939; Phyllopteryx eques Günther, 1865

= Leafy seadragon =

Species of fish

The leafy seadragon (Phycodurus eques) or Glauert's seadragon, is a marine fish. It is the only member of the genus Phycodurus in the family Syngnathidae, which includes seadragons, pipefish, and seahorses.

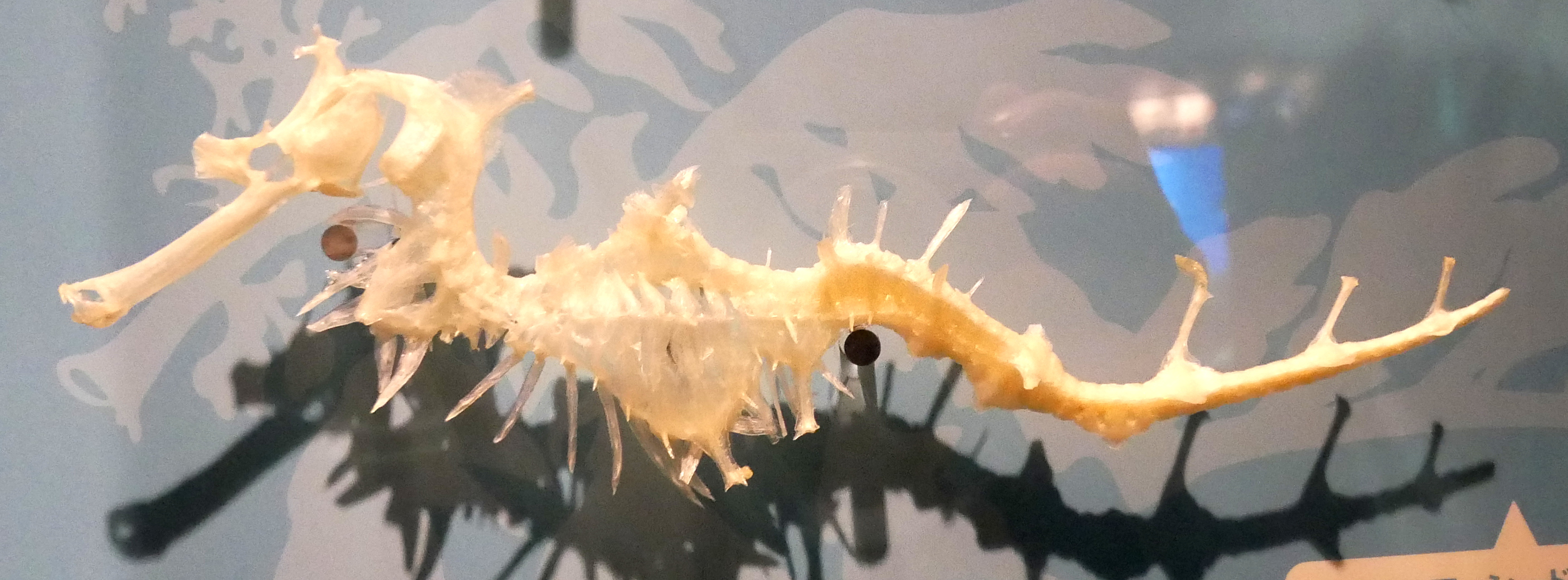
Leafy seadragon skeleton

It is found along the southern and western coasts of Australia. The name is derived from their appearance, with long leaf-like protrusions coming from all over the body. These protrusions are not used for propulsion; they serve only as camouflage. The leafy seadragon propels itself utilising a pair of pectoral fins on the sides of its neck and a dorsal fin on its back closer to the tail end. These small fins are almost completely transparent and difficult to see as they undulate minutely to move the creature sedately through the water, completing the illusion of floating seaweed.

Popularly known as "leafies", they are the marine emblem of the state of South Australia and a focus for local marine conservation.

== Taxonomy ==
The generic name is derived from the Ancient Greek words φῦκος (phûkos) "seaweed", and δέρμα (dérma] "skin". The word eques is derived from the Latin equus, meaning horse.

== Description ==
Much like the seahorse, the leafy seadragon's name is derived from its resemblance to another creature (in this case, the mythical dragon). They are slightly larger than most seahorses, growing to about 20–24 cm (8–9.5 in). They feed on plankton and small crustaceans.

The lobes of skin that grow on the leafy seadragon provide camouflage, giving it the appearance of seaweed. It is able to maintain the illusion when swimming, appearing to move through the water like a piece of floating seaweed. It can also change colour to blend in, but this ability depends on the seadragon's diet, age, location, and stress level.

The leafy seadragon is related to the pipefish and belongs to the family Syngnathidae, along with the seahorse. It differs from the seahorse in appearance, form of locomotion, and its inability to coil or grasp things with its tail. A related species is the weedy seadragon, which is multicoloured and grows weed-like fins, but is smaller than the leafy seadragon. Another unique feature is the small, circular gill openings covering tufted gills, very unlike the crescent-shaped gill openings and ridged gills of most fish species.

== Habitat and distribution ==
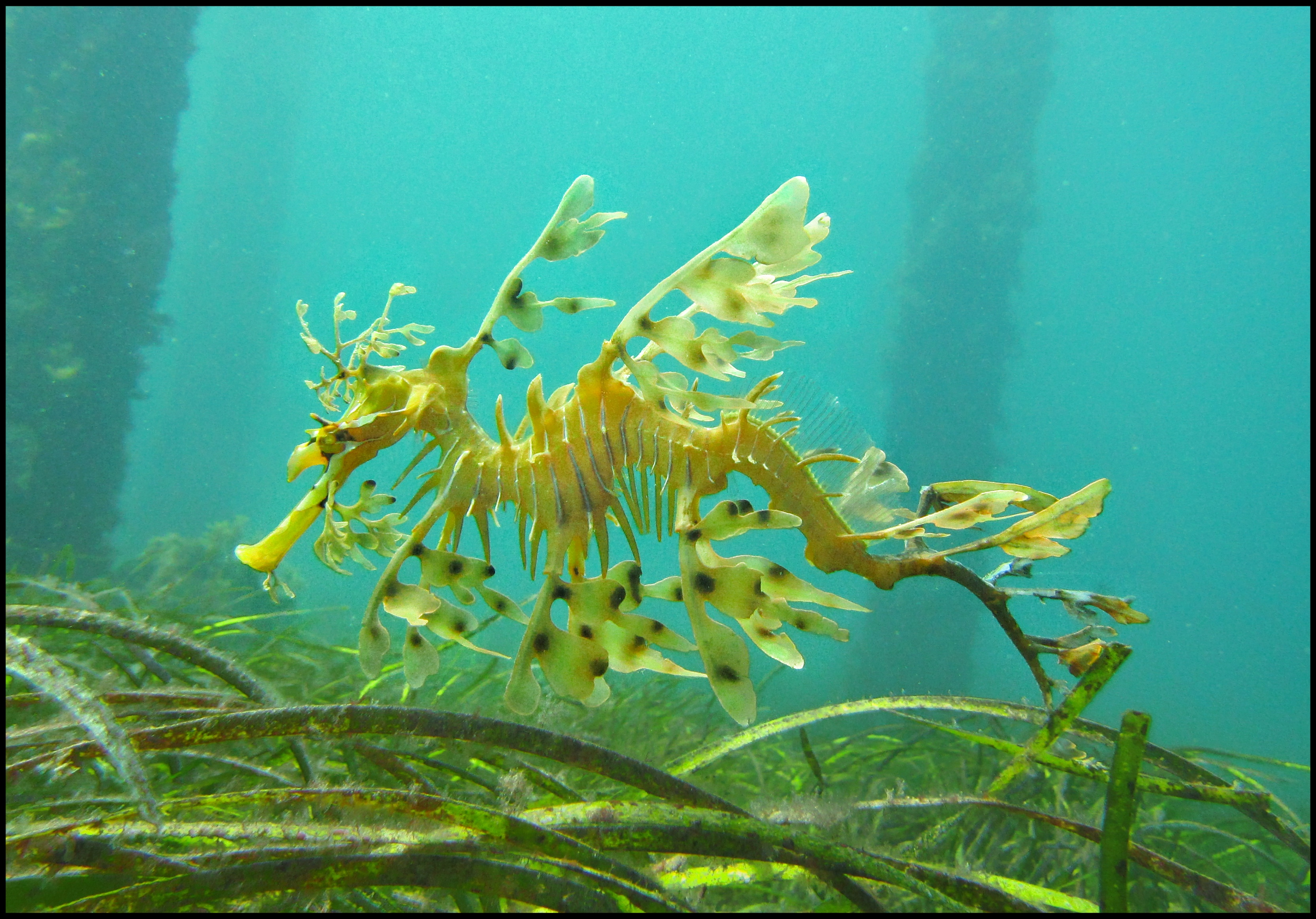
At Rapid Bay jetty

The leafy seadragon is found only in southern Australian waters, from Wilson's Promontory in Victoria at the eastern end of its range, westward to Jurien Bay, 220 km (140 mi) north of Perth in Western Australia. Individuals were once thought to have very restricted ranges; but further research has discovered that seadragons actually travel several hundred metres from their habitual locations, returning to the same spot using a strong sense of direction. They are mostly found over sand patches in waters up to 50 m (160 ft) deep, around kelp-covered rocks and clumps of seagrass. They are commonly sighted by scuba divers near Adelaide in South Australia, especially at Rapid Bay, Edithburgh, and Victor Harbor.

== Ecology ==
Leafy seadragons usually live a solitary lifestyle. When the time comes, males court the females, they then pair up to breed. From the moment they hatch, leafy seadragons are completely independent. By the age of two years, they are typically full grown and ready to breed.

The species feeds by sucking up small crustaceans, such as amphipods and mysid shrimp, plankton, and larval fish through its long, pipe-like snout.

=== Reproduction ===
As with seahorses, the male leafy seadragon cares for the eggs. The female produces up to 250 bright pink eggs, then deposits them onto the male's tail with her ovipositor, a long tube. The eggs then attach themselves to a brood patch, which supplies them with oxygen. After 9 weeks, the eggs begin to hatch, depending on water conditions. The eggs turn a ripe purple or orange over this period, after which the male pumps his tail until the young emerge, a process which takes place over 24–48 hours. The male aids the hatching of the eggs by shaking his tail, and rubbing it against seaweed and rocks. Once born, the young seadragon is completely independent, eating small zooplankton until large enough to hunt mysids. Only about 5% of the eggs survive. Each newborn fry begins life with a small, externally-attached yolk-sac. This sac provides them sustenance for their first few days of life. Despite this initial nutrition source, the majority of fry will instinctively learn to hunt and catch prey upon hatching, and will become self-reliant before the sac is gone.

=== Movement ===
The leafy seadragon uses the fins along the side of its head to allow it to steer and turn. However, its outer skin is fairly rigid, limiting mobility. Individual leafy seadragons have been observed remaining in one location for extended periods of time (up to 68 hours), but will sometimes move for lengthy periods. The tracking of one individual indicated it moved at up to 150 m (490 ft) per hour.

== Conservation ==
Leafy seadragons are subject to many threats, both natural and man-made. They are caught by collectors, but unlike other syngnathid fish, are not used in alternative medicine. They are vulnerable when first born, and are slow swimmers, reducing their chance of escaping from a predator. Seadragons are sometimes washed ashore after storms.

The species has become endangered through pollution and industrial runoff, as well as collection for the aquarium trade. In response to these dangers, the species has been totally protected in South Australia since 1987, Victoria since at least 1995, and Western Australia since 1991. Additionally, the species' listing in the Australian government's Environment Protection and Biodiversity Conservation Act 1999 means that the welfare of the species has to be considered as a part of any developmental project.

== In captivity ==
Due to being protected by law, obtaining seadragons is often an expensive and difficult process as they must be from captive bred stock, and exporters must prove their broodstock were caught before collecting restrictions went into effect, or that they had a license to collect seadragons. Seadragons have a specific level of protection under federal fisheries legislation as well as in most Australian states where they occur. Seadragons are difficult to maintain in aquaria. Success in keeping them has been largely confined to the public aquarium sector, due to funding and knowledge that would not be available to the average enthusiast. Attempts to breed the leafy seadragon in captivity have so far been unsuccessful.

=== Australia ===
Australian aquaria featuring leafy seadragons include the Sydney Aquarium, the Melbourne Aquarium, and the Aquarium of Western Australia.

=== Canada ===
Ripley's Aquarium of Canada in Toronto displays both leafy and weedy seadragons.

Leafy seadragon at the South East Asia Aquarium. Video clip

=== South East Asia ===
S.E.A. Aquarium, located in the Marine Life Park of Singapore, displays both leafy and weedy seadragons.

=== United States ===
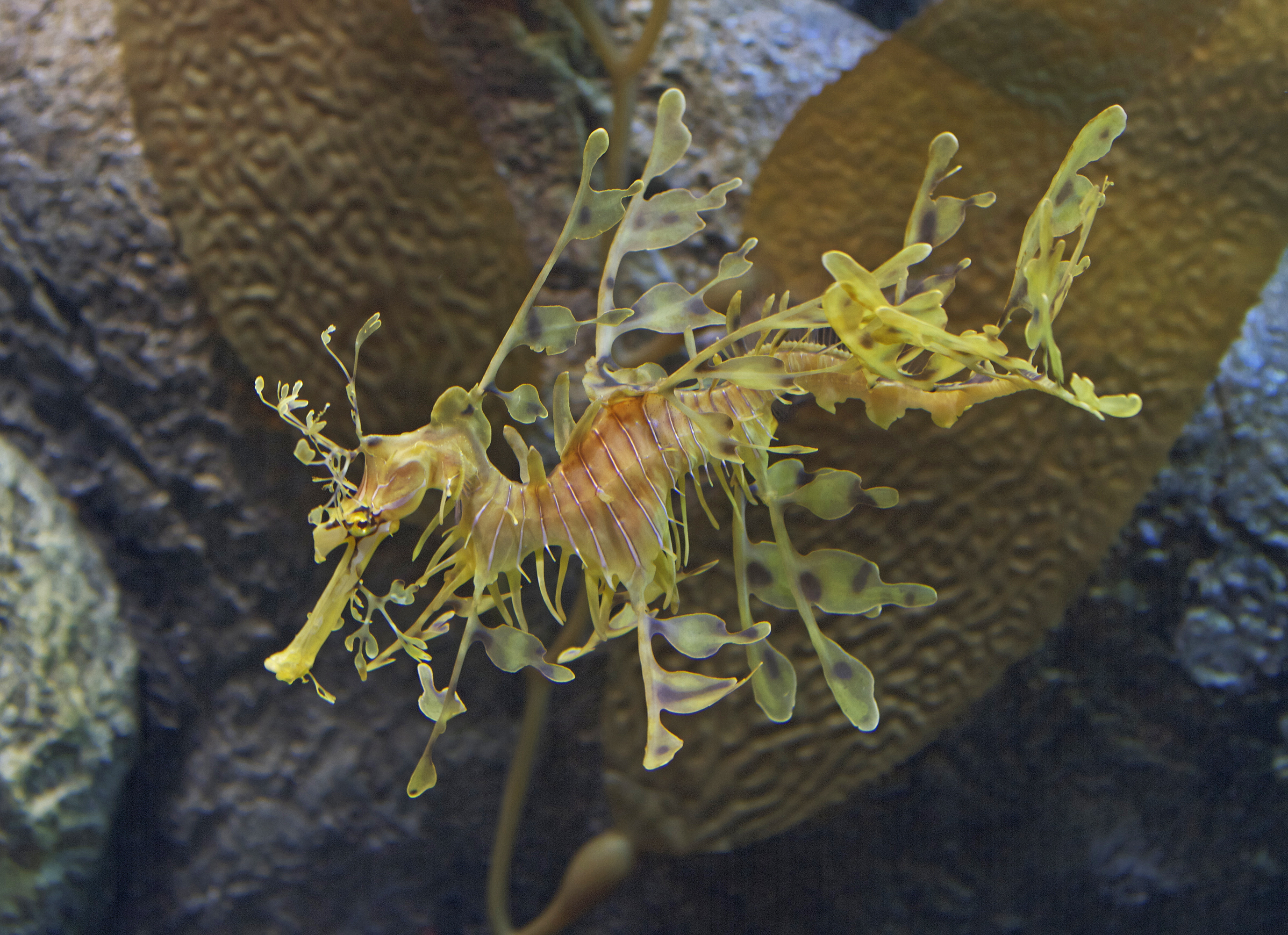
Leafy seadragon at the Monterey Bay Aquarium

A number of aquaria in the United States have leafy seadragon research programs or displays. Among these are the Adventure Aquarium in Camden, New Jersey; Aquarium of the Pacific at Long Beach; Birch Aquarium in San Diego; the Minnesota Zoo; Monterey Bay Aquarium; the Dallas World Aquarium & the Dallas Children's Aquarium, Dallas; the New England Aquarium, Boston; the Point Defiance Zoo & Aquarium in Tacoma, Washington; the Newport Aquarium in Kentucky, the Shedd Aquarium, Chicago; the California Academy of Sciences; the Tennessee Aquarium; Sea World Orlando, Florida; the Pittsburgh Zoo & PPG Aquarium; Ripley's Aquarium of the Smokies, Gatlinburg, Tennessee; the Florida Aquarium in Tampa, Florida; the Mote Aquarium in Sarasota, Florida; and Ripley's Aquarium Broadway at Myrtle Beach, South Carolina.

=== Europe ===
The Lisbon Aquarium (Lisboa Oceanarium) has both leafy sea dragons and weedy sea dragons.

== Cultural references ==
The leafy seadragon is the official marine emblem of the state of South Australia. It is also featured in the logos of the Adelaide University Scuba Club Inc. and the Marine Life Society of South Australia Inc., two South Australian associations.

A biennial Leafy Sea Dragon Festival is held within the boundaries of the District Council of Yankalilla in South Australia. It is a festival of the environment, arts and culture of the Fleurieu Peninsula, with the theme of celebrating the leafy seadragon. The inaugural festival in 2005 attracted over 7,000 participants including 4000 visitors.

In 2006, an animated short film, The Amazing Adventures of Gavin, a Leafy Seadragon, was made on behalf of several South Australian organisations involved in conserving the marine environment, including the Coast Protection Board, the Department of Environment and Heritage and the Marine Discovery Centre. Made through a collaboration of The People's Republic of Animation, Waterline Productions and the SA Film Corporation, the film is an introductory guide to marine conservation and the marine bioregions of South Australia suitable for 8–12 year olds, and copies were distributed on DVD to all primary schools in the State. An educator's resource kit to accompany the film was released in 2008.

The Pokémon species Dragalge, introduced in the series' 6th generation and the Pokémon X & Y games, appears to be based on a leafy seadragon.

== See also ==
- Weedy seadragon (Common seadragon)
- Ruby seadragon
- Genome evolution in seadragons
- Seahorse
- Pipefish
- Sargassum fish
