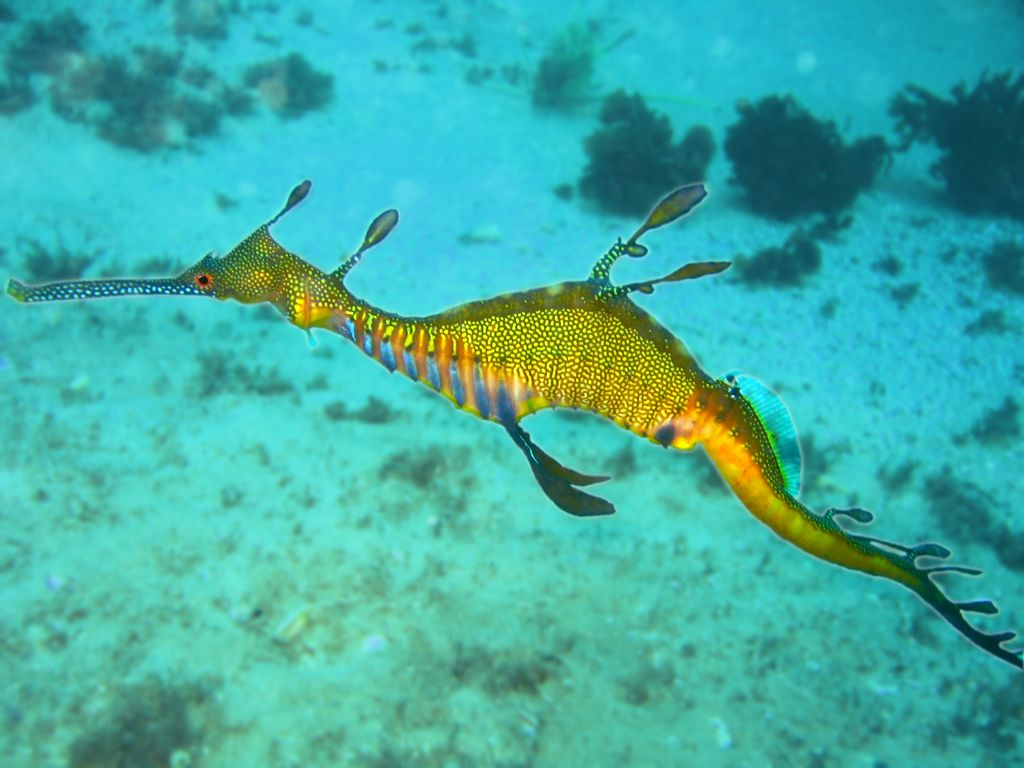

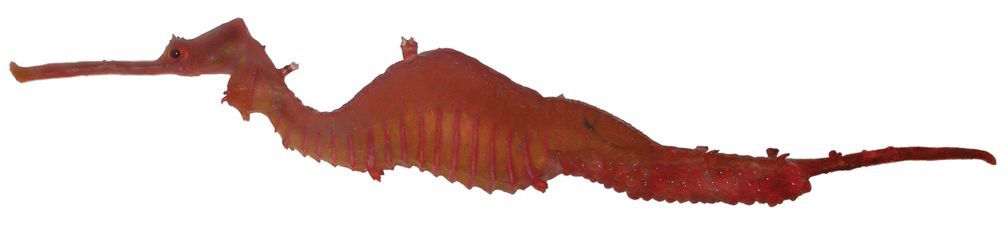
- Phyllopteryx taeniolatus above, Phyllopteryx dewysea below

Scientific classification
- Kingdom: Animalia
- Phylum: Chordata
- Class: Actinopterygii
- Division: Teleostei
- Order: Syngnathiformes
- Family: Syngnathidae
- Subfamily: Syngnathinae
- Genus: Phyllopteryx; Swainson, 1839

Type species
- Syngnathus foliatus Shaw, 1804

= Phyllopteryx =

Genus of fishes

Phyllopteryx is a genus of small fishes, commonly called seadragons, in the family Syngnathidae that are found along the western and southern coasts of Australia. Since the 19th century, the weedy or common seadragon was the only known species, until the description of the ruby seadragon in 2015. They are closely related to other members of the Syngnathidae such as the leafy seadragon, pipefish and seahorses, which all exhibit male pregnancy.

== Species ==
Two species are recognised:

- Common seadragon or weedy seadragon (Phyllopteryx taeniolatus) (Lacépède, 1804)
- Ruby seadragon (Phyllopteryx dewysea) Stiller, Wilson, & Rouse, 2015
