= Marine Life Society of South Australia =

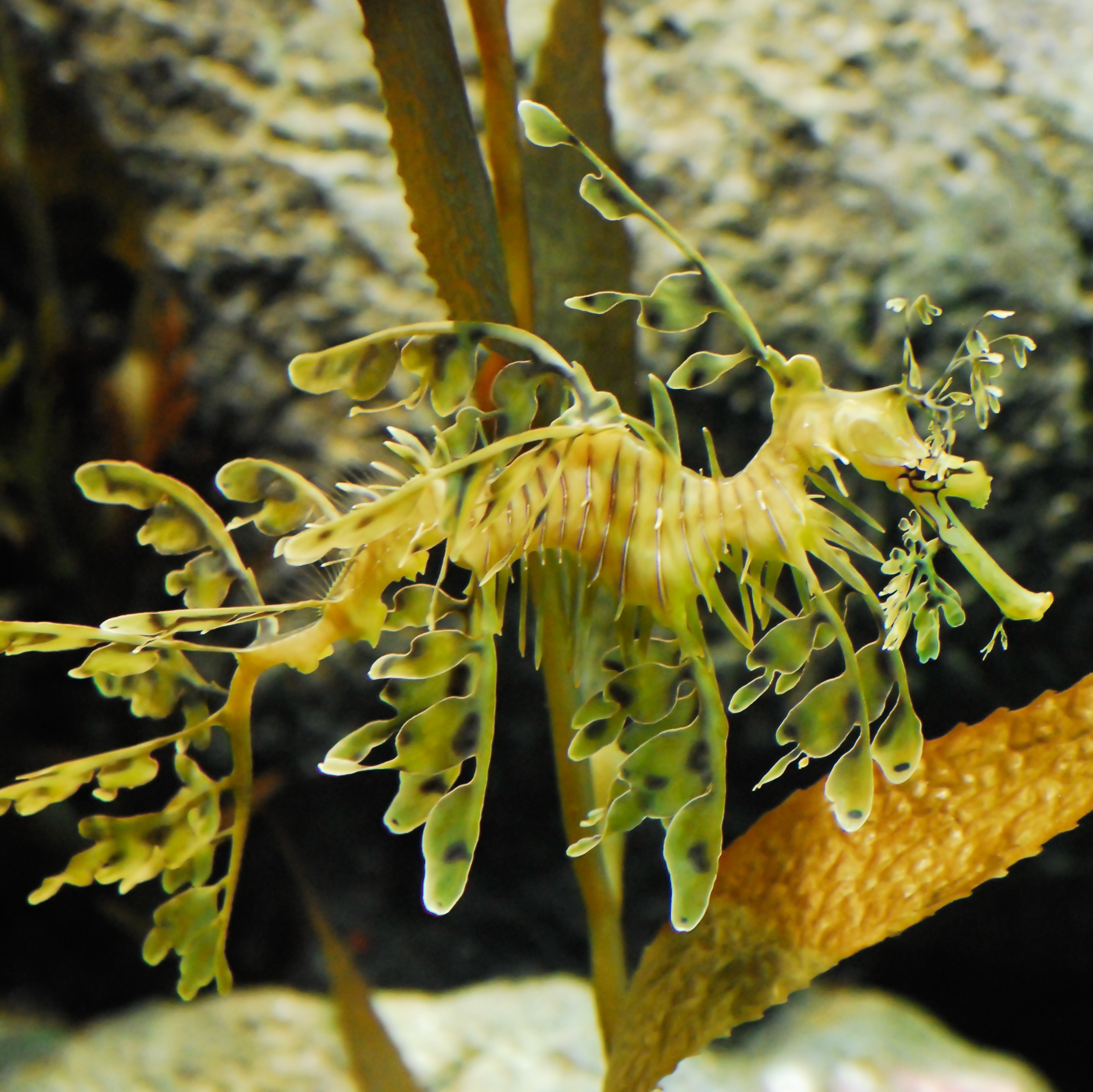
The leafy sea dragon features in MLSSA's logo.

Established in 1976, the Marine Life Society of South Australia is a long-standing incorporated association which aims to foster the study and appreciation of marine life and encourage marine conservation engagement in South Australia. The society's most notable recent achievement was the statewide protection of all Syngnathidae (including the leafy sea dragon, weedy sea dragon, pipefish and seahorses) under the State's Fisheries Management Act. This was driven by concerns that the animals could become targeted by aquarium keepers and poachers looking to exploit the species for the aquarium trade.

== Aims & objectives ==
1. To foster the study of marine life
2. To promote education and public awareness of all life in the sea
3. To encourage the conservation and protection of the marine environment

== Achievements ==
In February 2006, Minister for Fisheries Rory McEwen announced the protection of all Syngnathidae in South Australian waters under the Fisheries Management Act. The decision was the result of club president Philip Hall's direct representation to the State Premier, Mike Rann during a Community Cabinet meeting.

In 2014 the society took a more outward facing approach than in previous years, presenting the inaugural Whyalla Underwater Shootout photography competition and an art exhibition at Port Noarlunga. The society also responded to a variety of marine conservation issues including the potential impact of shipping noise on the Australian giant cuttlefish aggregation of Upper Spencer Gulf and a mass stranding of sperm whales at Ardrossan, Yorke Peninsula in December. The Marine Life Society was also represented at Adelaide rallies and events held in opposition to the Western Australian shark cull.

== Current projects ==
The society's current projects include the preparation of a Beach Wash Guide, designed to help beach-combers identify and learn about organisms sighted or collected from South Australian beaches. As of 2013, the guide has been under development for 14 years.

For many years, the society produced an annual calendar featuring photographs of South Australian marine life taken by its members. The calendars were sold as a fundraising and outreach exercise. The society also hosted an online photo index of species native to South Australian waters on its website, though this was retired with the development of the Atlas of Living Australia and iNaturalist.org's databases.

In December 2013, a once-off grant to the Marine Discovery Centre at the Star of the Sea School was approved by the society's committee to sponsor the design, production and establishment of three outdoor interpretive signs. The project is intended to provide information on the need for 'catchment to coast' care. At the time, it was the largest grant ever made by the Society.

In 2019, the society received a grant from the City of Port Adelaide Enfield to develop the first edition of the Port Adelaide Anchor Trail. The project was completed in 2020.

== Species of conservation concern ==
Since 2006, the society's priority species of conservation concern have become the western blue groper (Achoerodus gouldii) and the harlequin fish (Othox dentex). As of 2014, the society is developing a number of position statements on a variety of marine conservation matters.

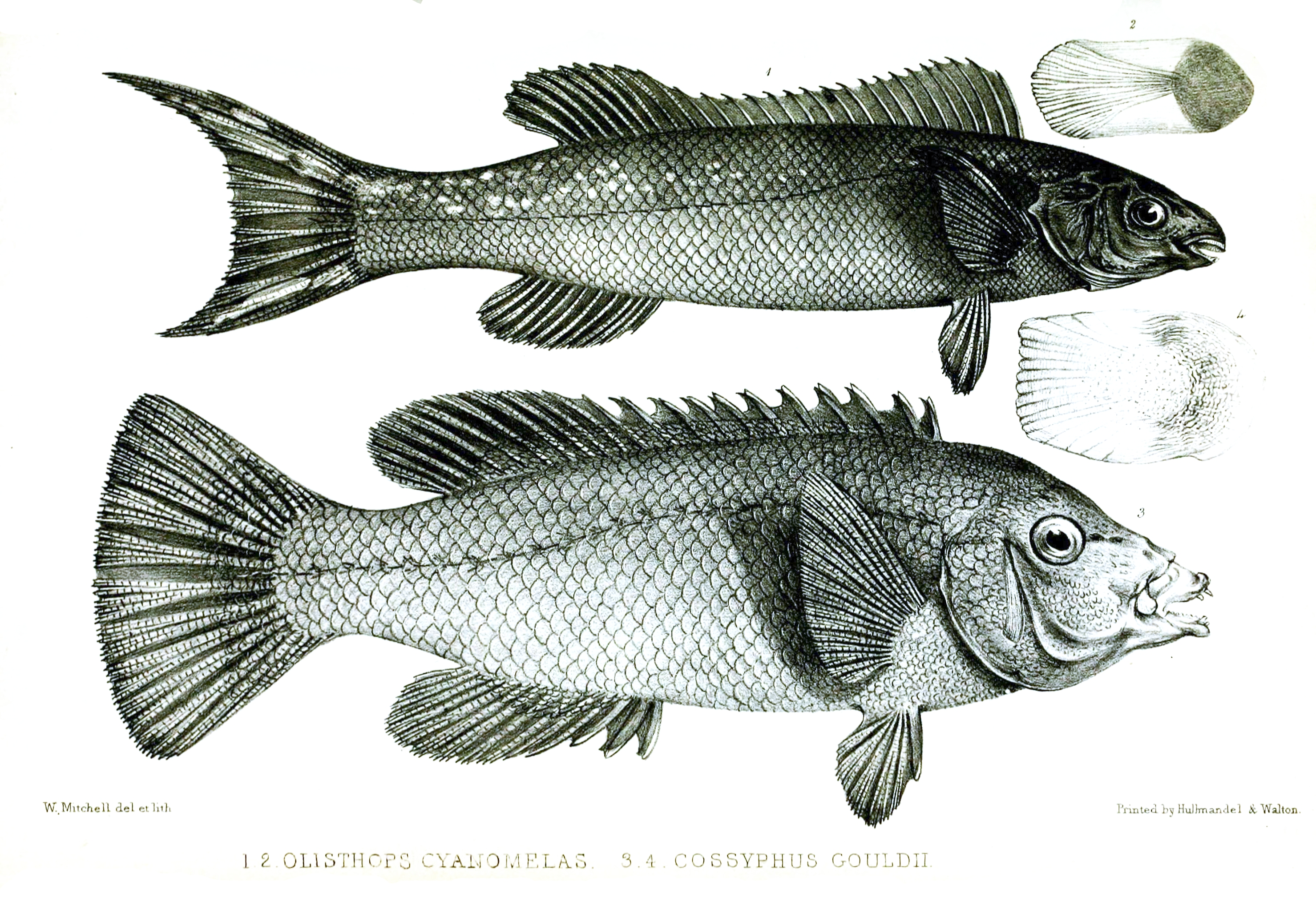
Western blue groper (Achoerodus gouldii)

== Resources ==
The society published a monthly newsletter and an annual journal until 2014. An archive of past issues is available at the society's website, dating back to the 1990s. In 2014, the newsletter was discontinued in favour of posting articles online.

The society has an extensive library of publications relevant to South Australian marine life which are available to members and to visitors to the Port Environment Centre where the collection is housed.

== Sponsorships & Patronage ==
The society is both a sponsor of and a recipient of sponsorship from other organisations. The society's current patron is Dr Wolfgang Zeidler. Former patrons of the society include published author and marine scientist, Scoresby Shepherd AO.
