= Leafy Sea Dragon Festival =

Australian environment, arts and culture festival

Coordinates: 35°27′18″S 138°20′08″E

The biennial Leafy Sea Dragon Festival is held within the jurisdiction of the District Council of Yankalilla in South Australia. It is a festival of the environment, arts, and culture of the Fleurieu Peninsula, with a theme of celebrating the leafy sea dragon. The inaugural festival in 2005 attracted over 7,000 participants and visitors. The 2013 festival was held between 12 and 21 April with over 70 events scheduled.

== Leafy Sea Dragons ==
The leafy sea dragon is the official marine emblem of the state of South Australia. There is a stable population of leafy sea dragons under the pair of jetties at Rapid Bay within the District Council of Yankalilla.

== See also ==
- List of festivals in Australia
