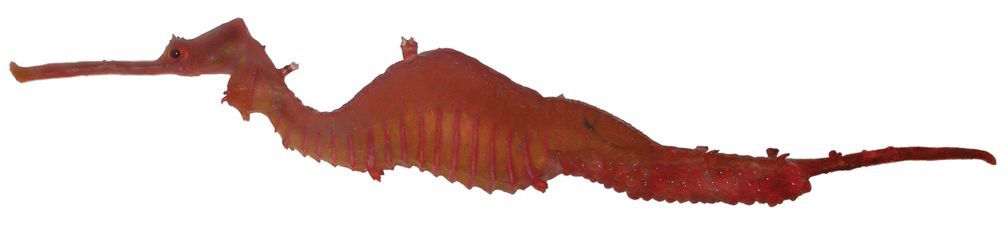

Conservation status
- Data Deficient (IUCN 3.1)

Scientific classification
- Kingdom: Animalia
- Phylum: Chordata
- Class: Actinopterygii
- Division: Teleostei
- Order: Syngnathiformes
- Family: Syngnathidae
- Genus: Phyllopteryx
- Species: P. dewysea

Binomial name
- Phyllopteryx dewysea Stiller, Wilson, & Rouse, 2015

= Ruby seadragon =

Species of marine fish

The ruby seadragon (Phyllopteryx dewysea) is a marine fish in the family Syngnathidae, which includes seadragons, seahorses, and pipefishes. This is the third known species of seadragon, described in 2015, and the first to be discovered in 150 years. It has been sighted on the coast of Western Australia. As of 2025, there are significant knowledge gaps on this species, and only a few individuals have been observed in the wild.

The ruby seadragon is named to honor Mary 'Dewy' Lowe, a supporter of seadragon conservation and research.

== Description ==
The ruby seadragon is characterized by a ruby red body with pink vertical bars that extend halfway up, meeting lateral trunk ridges. They have a slender, elongated body, like the common seadragon. Their body has 18 trunk segments with an enlarged pectoral area and spines. In contrast to the other two seadragon species, the ruby seadragon has a curved prehensile tail with a yellow tip. It also lacks dermal appendages (the leaf-like structures on other seadragon species) despite possessing the bony spines that these would attach to.

It is possible that ruby seadragons exhibit sexual dimorphism. Of the two live ruby seadragon observations, one was potentially a female. This female had a deeper, circular body shape, with darker red coloration and obvious vertical bars.

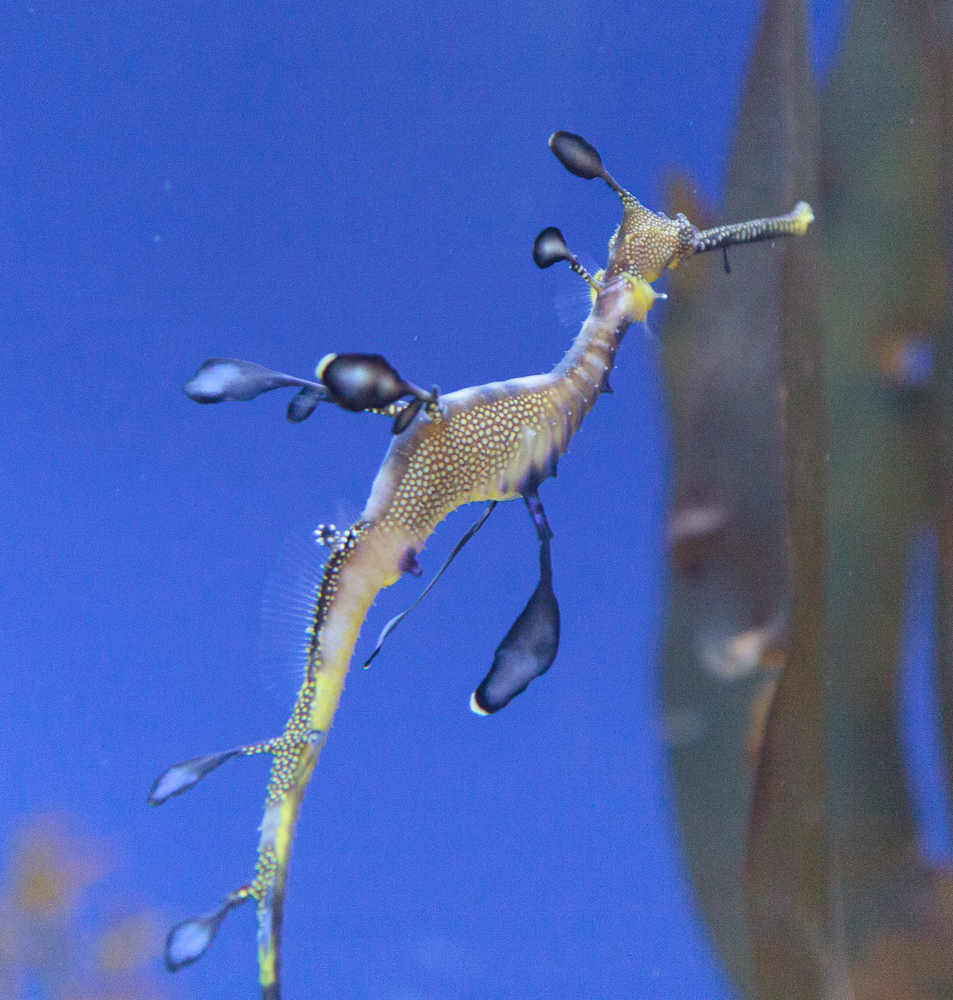
This common seadragon has dermal appendages (leaf-like structures) where the ruby seadragon has none.

The holotype (a single individual used to formally describe the species) of the ruby seadragon was a male carrying its brood. In addition to the above description, it had light snout markings; when preserved, its uniform coloration faded to brown. Five paratypes (additional specimen representing species variation) were identified following the discovery of the holotype. The holotype specimen is kept in the Western Australian Museum in Perth (Code WAM P33223.002).

There is no difference in quantitative measurements between the three seadragon species, but the ruby seadragon can be distinguished through visual observation. The common seadragon has a spotted appearance that remains after preservation and the leafy seadragon has white and purple vertical bars that extend past the body. Furthermore, the common and leafy seadragons have paired backwards-facing spines and a head spine. These differences are in addition to the aforementioned.

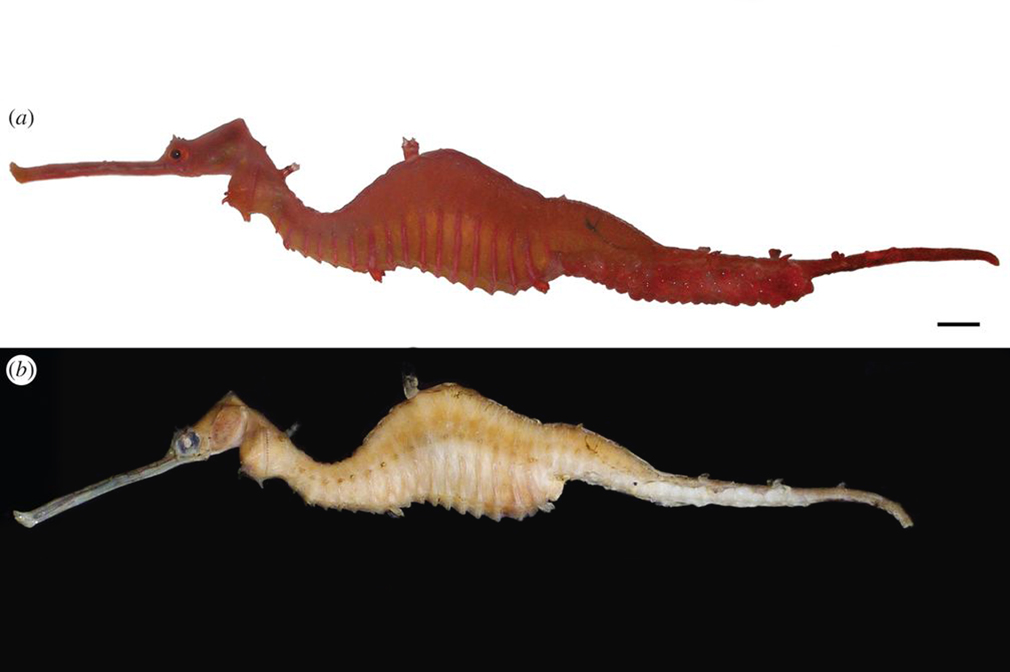
Color comparison of the ruby seadragon holotype after preservation.

== Distribution & habitat ==
As of 2025, there are no estimates of ruby seadragon population sizes.

As of 2017, all of the 6 ruby seadragon specimens were collected in Western Australia. Three of the specimens were near Perth, one was in the Recherche Archipelago, one at Culver Cliffs, and the last near Esperance. It is likely that the ruby seadragon evaded prior identification because of their deep-water range, outside of the recreational scuba depth. The holotype was trawled in the Recherche Archipelago at a depth of 51–72 meters, indicating that ruby seadragon species may prefer deeper waters. This theory was confirmed in April 2016 during a survey of the Recherche Archipelago (at 50+ meters), resulting in the first live records of the ruby seadragon; these two sightings, in addition to the previous male with brood (2007), suggest a viable population in the Recherche Archipelago. Prior specimen locations may indicate a wider range in Western Australia, but this claim requires further evidence.

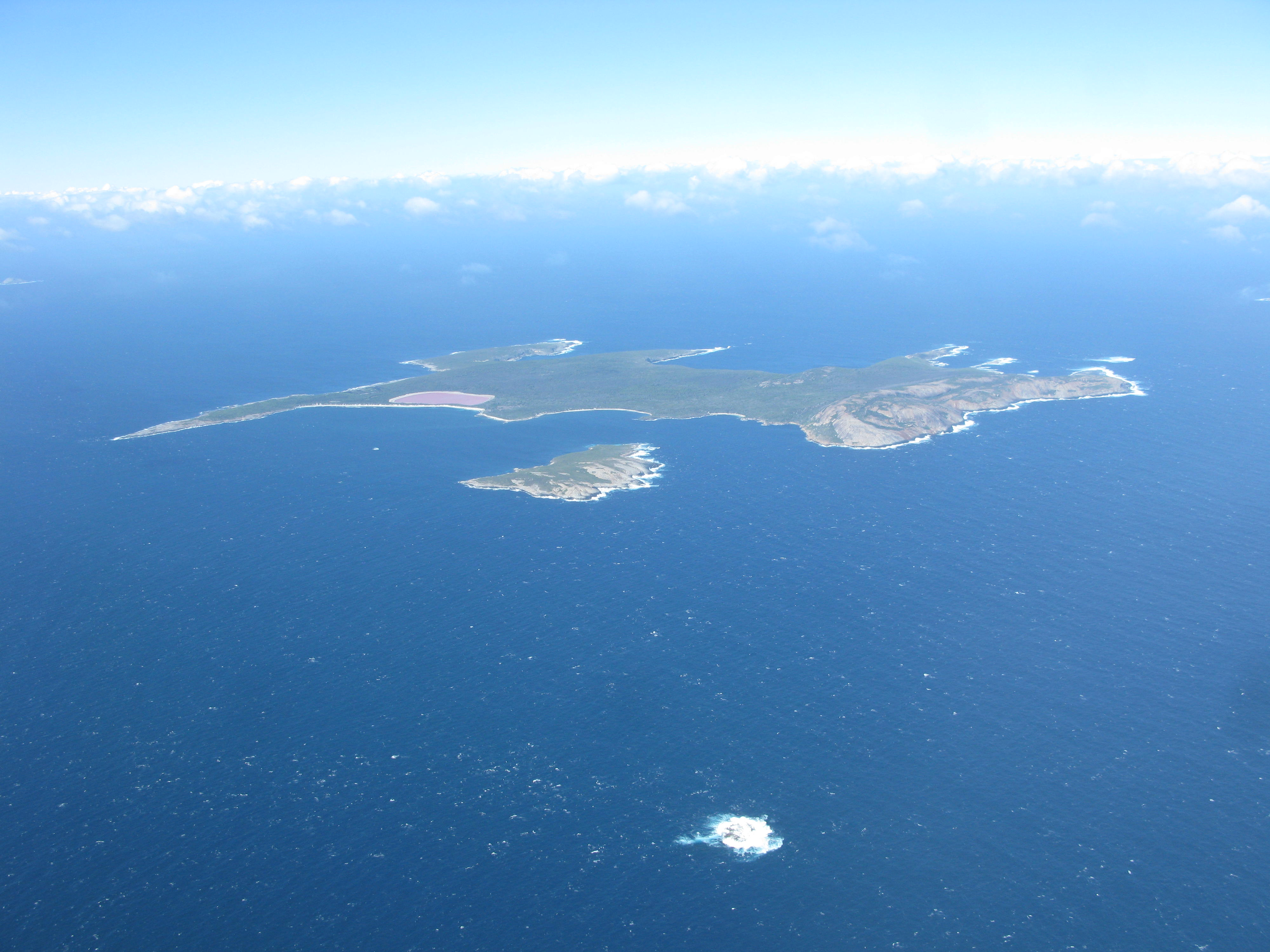
Middle Island in the Recherche Archipelago. This island is south-east of Esperance, where a ruby seadragon specimen was found.

The Recherche Archipelago is the potential locality of the ruby seadragon. This area of Western Australia is a 230-kilometer chain of approximately 105 islands and 1500 islets. As of 2005, there was little research into the ocean currents of the area, but the region is described as storm-dominated with few periods of calm. Three habitat types have been identified (seagrass, reef, and sand) and split into eight categories of seabed: dense, medium, sparse, and patchy seagrass; flat platform, heavy limestone, and granite reef; and bare sand. Species sampling revealed different fish communities between these broad habitat types, influenced by changes in vegetation density. There is also a wide variety of soft bottom substrate throughout the Recherche Archipelago region. Overall, the habitat of the ruby seadragon is likely a complex mix of reef and sand at 50+ meter depth. During the 2016 Recherche Archipelago survey, the habitat was described as soft sand substrate layered over hard reef with a bottom temperature of 18 °Celsius. The community composition included large demosponges, gorgonians, foliose bryozoan colonies, among others.

The proposed habitat of the ruby seadragon is dramatically different from that of the common and leafy seadragons. The common and leafy seadragons are found in a range of depths (1-50 meters and 20+ meters, respectively), from shallow estuaries to deep offshore reefs. They feed on small crustaceans along kelp reefs and sandy edges. This contrasts the open, turbulent, deep habitat of the ruby seadragon, characterized by soft sand and hard reef mix.

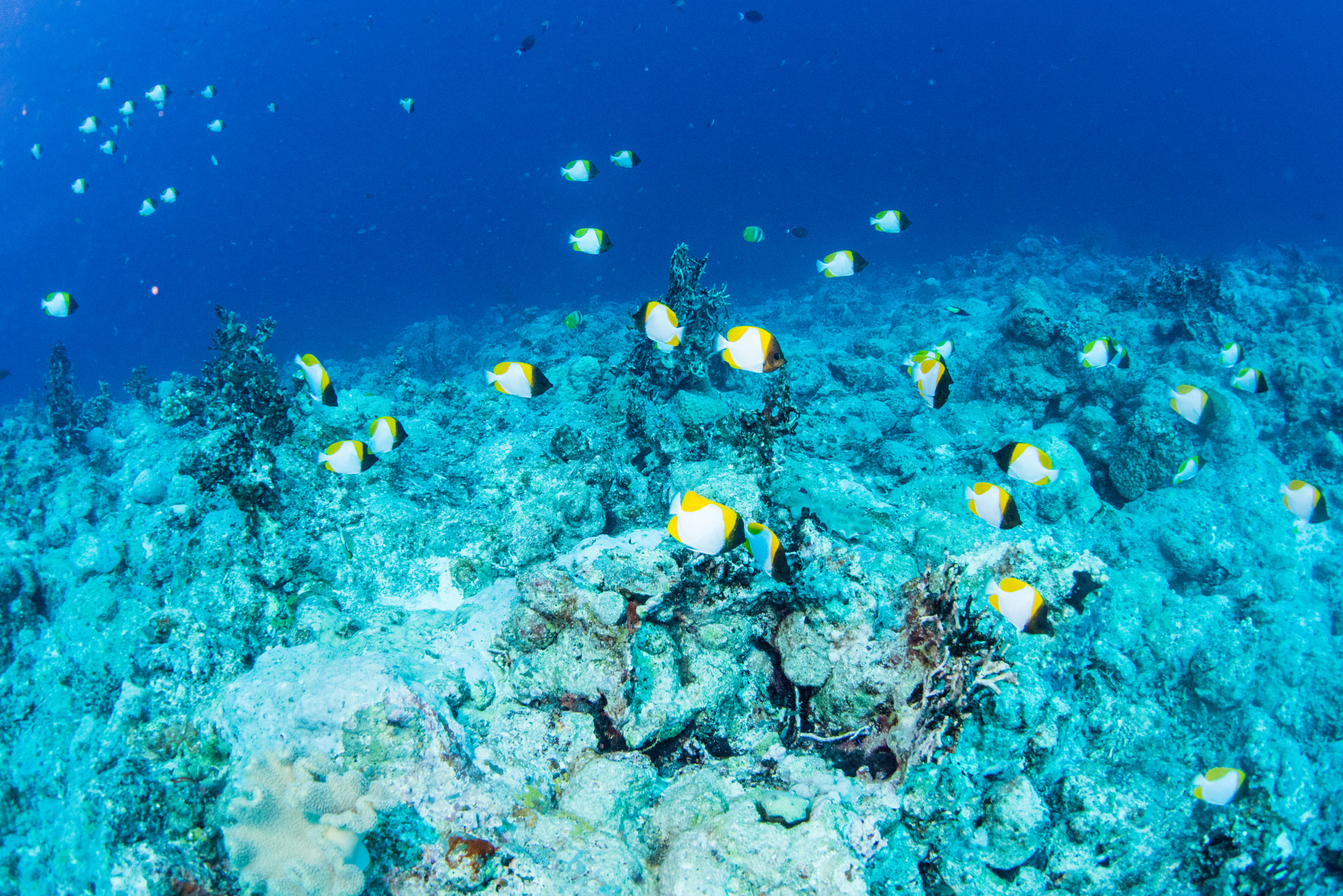
An example of hard reef and soft sand substrate. Photo was taken off the coast of Queensland, Australia, in the Coral Sea.

== Biology & ecology ==
Due to limited knowledge, researchers are uncertain about the behavior, ecology, and life cycle of the ruby seadragon, and of other seadragon species. The assumptions below are subject to change as further research is conducted.

The holotype of the ruby seadragon was collected with brood, so the reproductive strategy of this species resembles other seadragons. In the common and leafy seadragon species, the female's eggs are transferred to the male's brood patch for incubation until the young hatch.

The ruby seadragon diet is not known but its snout morphology suggests that it is adapted for predation, like other seadragon species. The common and leafy seadragons prey on small crustaceans and mysids. In observation, the ruby seadragons were seen striking at sandy substrate, potentially feeding on similar prey.

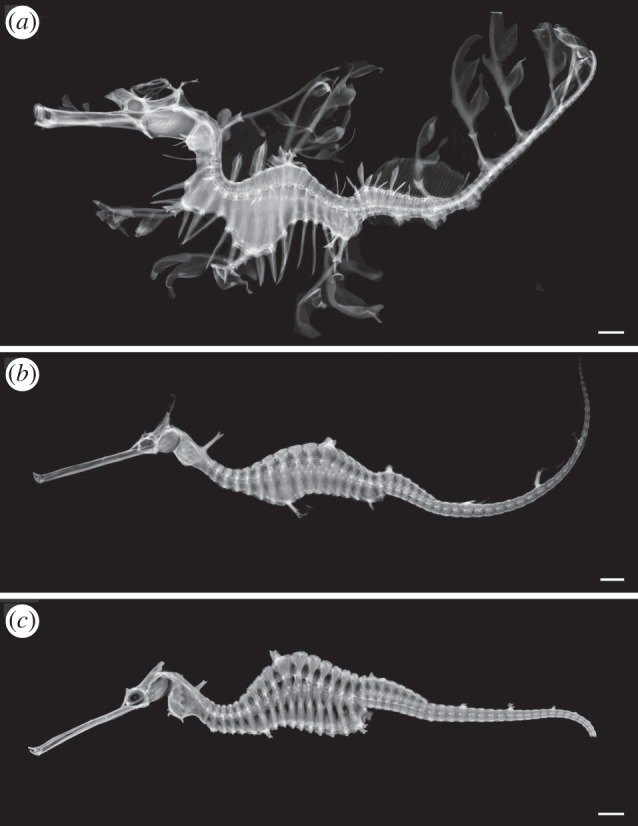
Comparison of the skeleton of the three species of seadragons, showing bony spines. (a) leafy seadragon, (b) the common seadragon, and (c) ruby seadragon.

An interesting trait of the ruby seadragon is the lack of dermal appendages despite possessing bony spines for these structures. This is attributed to the sparse and turbulent habitat they are sighted in, as bulky appendages can add drag and resistance during strong surges. They would not serve the same camouflaging purpose as for the common and leafy seadragons. The red coloration of the ruby seadragon may be a camouflage strategy in the low-light depths that this species prefers. Depth has a substantial effect on the crypticity of a species, dorsal coloration of species trends to red with increasing depth. In low-light environments, red coloration is considered a defense against bioluminescence, particularly at 400+ meter depths. This is because the spectrum of bioluminescence lacks red wavelengths, therefore red surfaces are not visible to species that rely on bioluminescence.

The ruby seadragon also has a curved prehensile tail which may be used for stabilization in reef habitats during strong current surges. In other Syngnathid species possessing a prehensile tail, the tail is used to grasp onto vertical objects. Other seadragon species, which live in denser kelp forests, lack a prehensile tail.

== Phylogeny ==
A phylogenetic tree was constructed using molecular sampling to compare the three seadragon species and determine their evolutionary history. This species is identified as the sister-species to the common seadragon, with the leafy seadragon as a sister to the clade. The most common recent ancestor of the seadragon lineage is estimated to be 6.80 million years ago. The divergence between the ruby and common seahorse is estimated to be 3.72 million years ago.

The discovery of a prehensile tail in the ruby seadragon species complicates the proposed phylogeny because its closest relative, the common seadragon, cannot bend its tail. The prehensile tail is a trait that has evolved five times in the Syngnathidae family. In all other Syngnathidae species with a prehensile tail, the tail has reduced distal plates, but this is not seen in the ruby seadragon. Researchers Rouse, Stiller, and Wilson propose the following two explanations for this discrepancy:

1. The absence of the prehensile tail independently evolved in the leafy and common seadragons. The ruby seadragon species' prehensile tail is a retained plesiomorphic condition (inherited trait that is not unique to the ruby seadragon).
2. The prehensile tail was lost in an ancestor of the three seadragon species and the ruby seadragon independently re-acquired this trait (inherited trait is unique to the ruby seadragon in this group).

Additional research is necessary to understand the evolutionary history of the ruby seadragon.

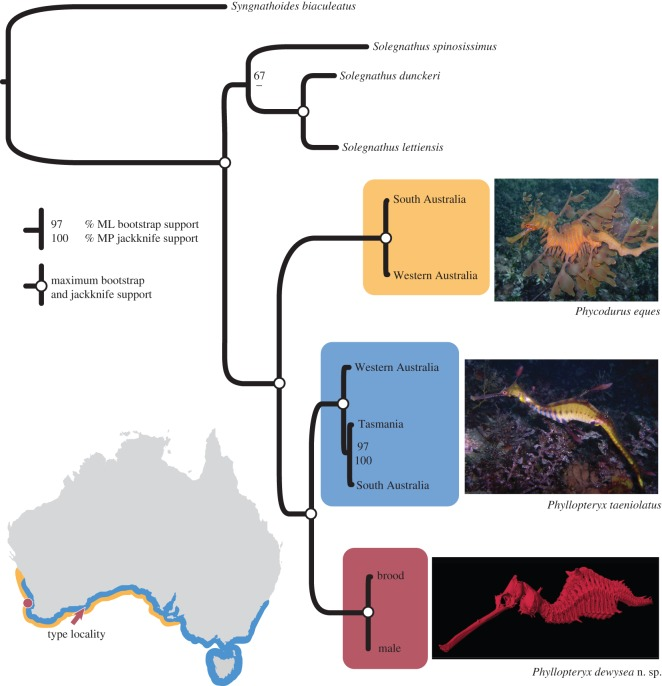
Phylogenetic relationship between the three seadragon species and their geographic distribution. The leafy seadragon is shown in gold, the common seadragon in blue, and the ruby seadragon in red.

== Conservation status ==
The ruby seadragon is listed as "Data Deficient" on the IUCN Red List after its 2015 assessment. This justification is because the species lacks necessary information, such as population size and range. Researchers Rouse et al. advocated for nominating the ruby seadragon for state and federal listing in 2017 to afford it similar protection as other seadragon species. All Syngnathids are protected in their range throughout Australian waters by the Australian Environmental Protection and Biodiversity Conservation Act (1999).

Precautionary conservation methods are recommended for seadragon species because of the lack of specific scientific knowledge. Habitat-focused conservation of the ruby seadragon could also benefit fishes and invertebrates that share a similar range. For example, protecting the mixed reef habitat of the ruby seadragon can positively impact the conservation goals of similar species. In Australia, Syngnathids were the first marine fishes to be brought under Australia's wildlife protection act. They are seen as non-controversial animals politically so policy and legislation can be introduced that is more challenging for other marine species.

The three major anthropogenic pressures affecting Syngnathid species are overexploitation, by-catch, and habitat degradation. The rapid urban development around Perth has changed the water quality and affected vegetation in the surrounding environment, which may also affect offshore habitat of the ruby seadragon. Seagrass species are specifically impacted by urban development, which floods the ocean with excess nutrients. The seagrass ecosystem shifts toward a phytoplankton dominated system where no additional seadragon habitat is created. When the seagrass canopy is broken, sediment is easily resuspended in the water column and light availability becomes low, making recolonization rare. Additionally, the trade of Syngnathid species in Australia is relatively low, though it is the sole source of live seadragon trade internationally. There is no evidence of seadragon population decline related to trade because it is unsustainable to catch and rear males of these species.

== See also ==
- Leafy seadragon
- Weedy seadragon
