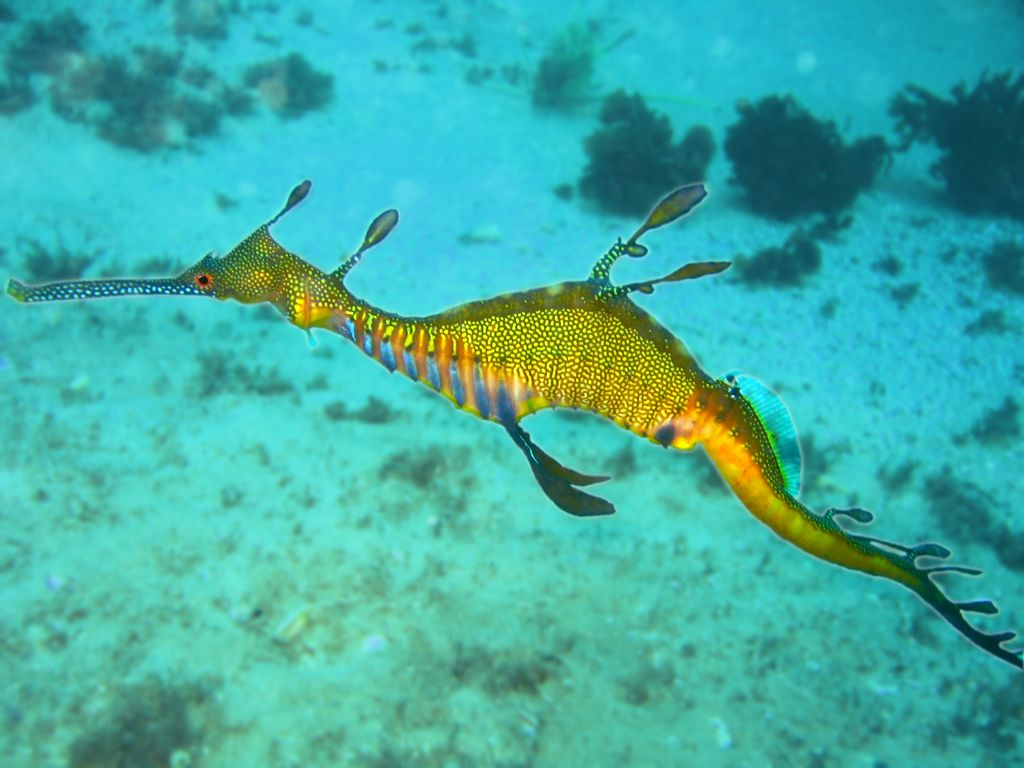
- Phyllopteryx taeniolatus in Cabbage Tree Bay, Sydney, Australia

Conservation status
- Vulnerable (IUCN 3.1)

Scientific classification
- Kingdom: Animalia
- Phylum: Chordata
- Class: Actinopterygii
- Division: Teleostei
- Order: Syngnathiformes
- Family: Syngnathidae
- Genus: Phyllopteryx
- Species: P. taeniolatus

Binomial name
- Phyllopteryx taeniolatus (Lacépède, 1804)
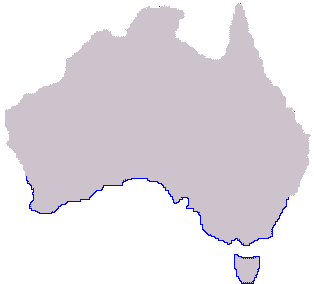
- Phyllopteryx taeniolatus range

Synonyms
- Syngnatus taeniolatus Lacepède, 1804; Syngnathus foliatus Shaw, 1804; Phyllopteryx foliatus (Shaw, 1804)

= Common seadragon =

Species of fish

The common seadragon or weedy seadragon (Phyllopteryx taeniolatus) is a marine fish of the order Syngnathiformes, which also includes the similar pipefishes, seahorses, and trumpetfishes among other species. Adult common seadragons are a reddish colour, with yellow and purple striped markings; they have small, leaf-like appendages that resemble kelp or seaweed fronds, providing camouflage, as well as a number of short spines for protection. As with seahorses and the other syngnathids, the seadragon has a similarly tubular snout and a fused, toothless jaw into which it captures small invertebrate prey at lightning speed. Males have narrower bodies and are darker than females. Seadragons have a long dorsal fin along the back and small pectoral fins on either side of the neck, which provide balance. Weedy seadragons can reach 45 cm (18 in) in length.

The common seadragon is the marine emblem of the Australian state of Victoria.

== Range and habitat ==
The common seadragon is endemic to Australian and insular coastal waters of the eastern Indian Ocean northern Southern Ocean and the southwestern Pacific Ocean. It can generally be found along the entire southern coastline of the Australian continent, including Tasmania and other offshore islands. It can be observed regularly from around Port Stephens, New South Wales to Geraldton, Western Australia, as well as off the coast of South Australia and the Great Australian Bight.

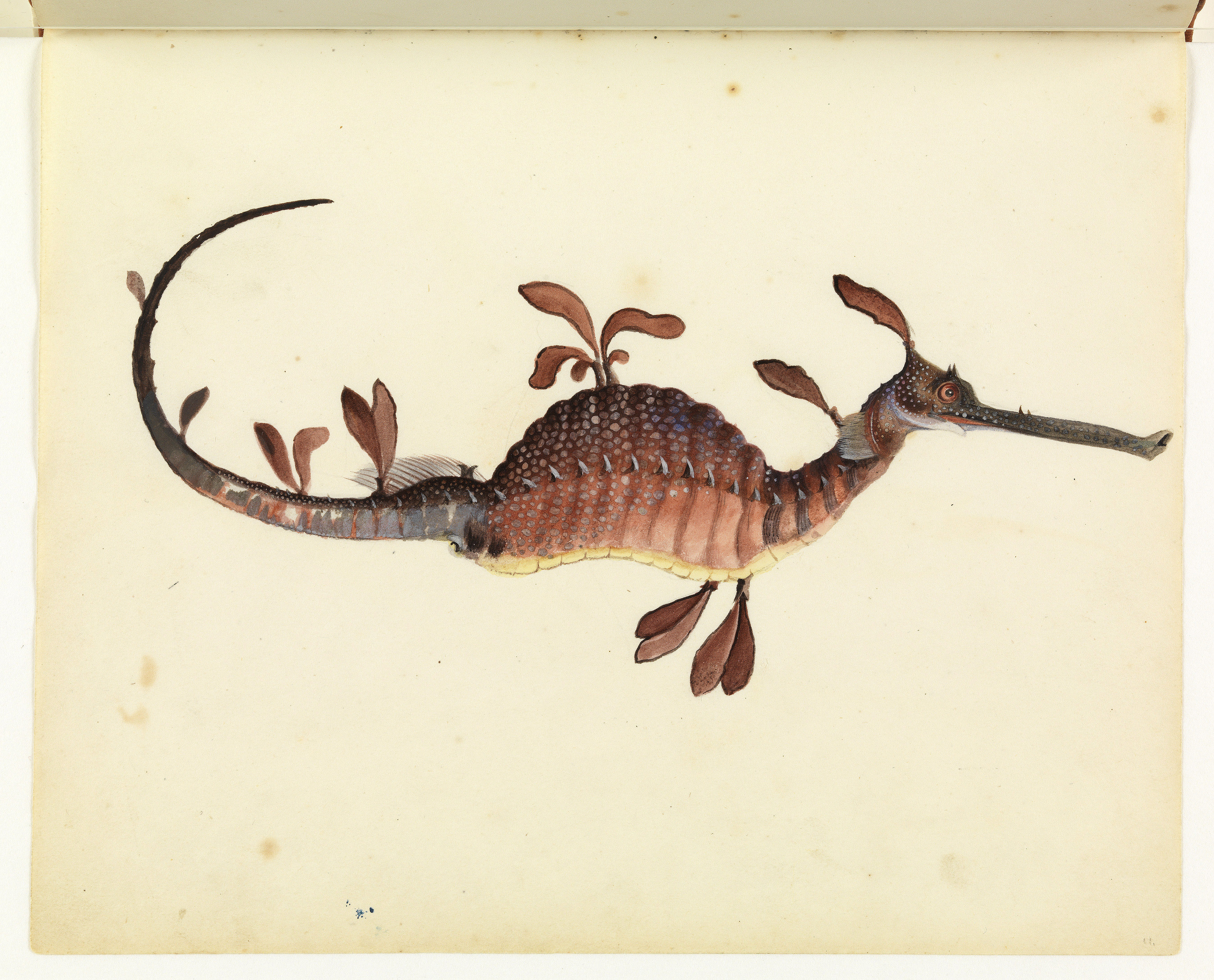
Common Seadragon, Phyllopteryx taeniolatus, from the Sketchbook of fishes by William Buelow Gould, 1832

The common seadragon inhabits coastal waters down around 10 m (33 ft) to 30 m (98 ft) deep. It is associated with rocky reefs, seaweed beds, seagrass meadows and structures colonised by seaweed.

== Biology ==
The seadragons are slow-moving and, like most of their relatives, rely on excellent camouflage—the mimicry of seaweed, in this case—as a defense against predators. They lack the prehensile tail that many seahorses and pipefishes have evolved as anchors, to clasp and steady themselves; seadragons, instead, drift in the water among kelp and seaweed masses, which they blend into with their leafy-looking appendages.

Individuals are observed either on their own or in pairs, feeding on tiny crustaceans and other zooplankton by sucking prey into their toothless mouths. As with most other syngnathids, seadragon males are the sex that cares for the developing eggs. Females lay around 120 eggs onto the brood patch located on the underside of the male's tail. The eggs are fertilised and carried by the male for around a month before the hatchlings emerge. The young are independent at birth, beginning to eat shortly after. Common seadragons take about 28 months to reach sexual maturity, and may live for up to six years.

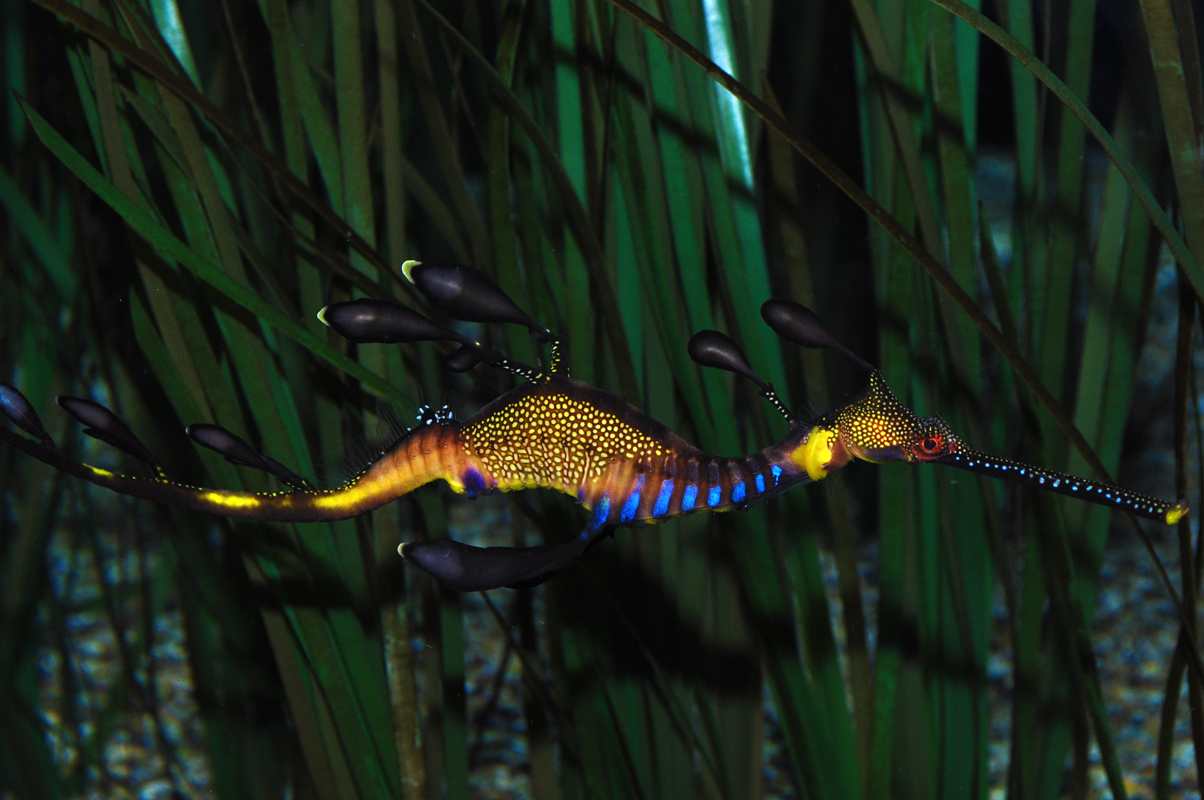
Common Seadragon

Mating in captivity is relatively rare since researchers have yet to understand what biological or environmental factors trigger them to reproduce. The survival rate for young common seadragons is low in the wild, but it is about 60% in captivity.

The Aquarium of the Pacific in Long Beach, California and the Tennessee Aquarium in Chattanooga, Tennessee, in the US, and Melbourne Aquarium in Melbourne, Australia are among the few facilities in the world to have successfully bred common seadragons in captivity, though others occasionally report egg-laying. In March 2012, the Georgia Aquarium in Atlanta announced a successful breeding event of common seadragons. In July of the same year, the Monterey Bay Aquarium successfully bred and hatched-out common seadragons, on-exhibit. Most recently, the Birch Aquarium in San Diego successfully bred and hatched common seadragon fry in early 2023.

Aquarium keepers must make adjustments to the water, food, tank setup, and captivity procedures, as many studies have shown that sea dragons are prone to diseases and infections such as scuticociliatosis, myxozoanosis, fungal infections, intestinal coccidiosis, neoplasia, and swim bladder issues, which can result from parasites growing in their bodies due to their captive environment.

== Threats ==
The common seadragon is classified as Vulnerable (VU) on the IUCN Red List. While the common seadragon is a desired species in the international aquarium trade, the volume of wild-caught individuals is small and therefore not currently a major threat. Instead, habitat loss and degradation due to human activities and pollution threaten common seadragons most.

The loss of suitable seagrass beds and loss of canopy seaweed from inshore rock reefs, coupled with natural history traits that make them poor dispersers, put the future of seadragon populations at risk. This species is not at present a victim of bycatch or a target of trade in traditional Chinese medicine, two activities which are currently a threat to many related seahorse and pipefish populations.

The weedy seadragon may be more endangered than currently assumed as a result of climate change-induced marine heatwaves on the Great Southern Reef. Edgar et al (2023) suggest that citizen science data reflects a population decline of 59% between 2011 and 2021, a period of frequent and extensive marine heatwaves, which would be enough to classify it as Endangered on the IUCN Red List. However, Schlögl and Booth (2025) demonstrate that the data used in Edgar et al. (2023) are insufficient (i.e., too sparse) to draw any meaningful conclusions about the population trend at present.

== Conservation ==
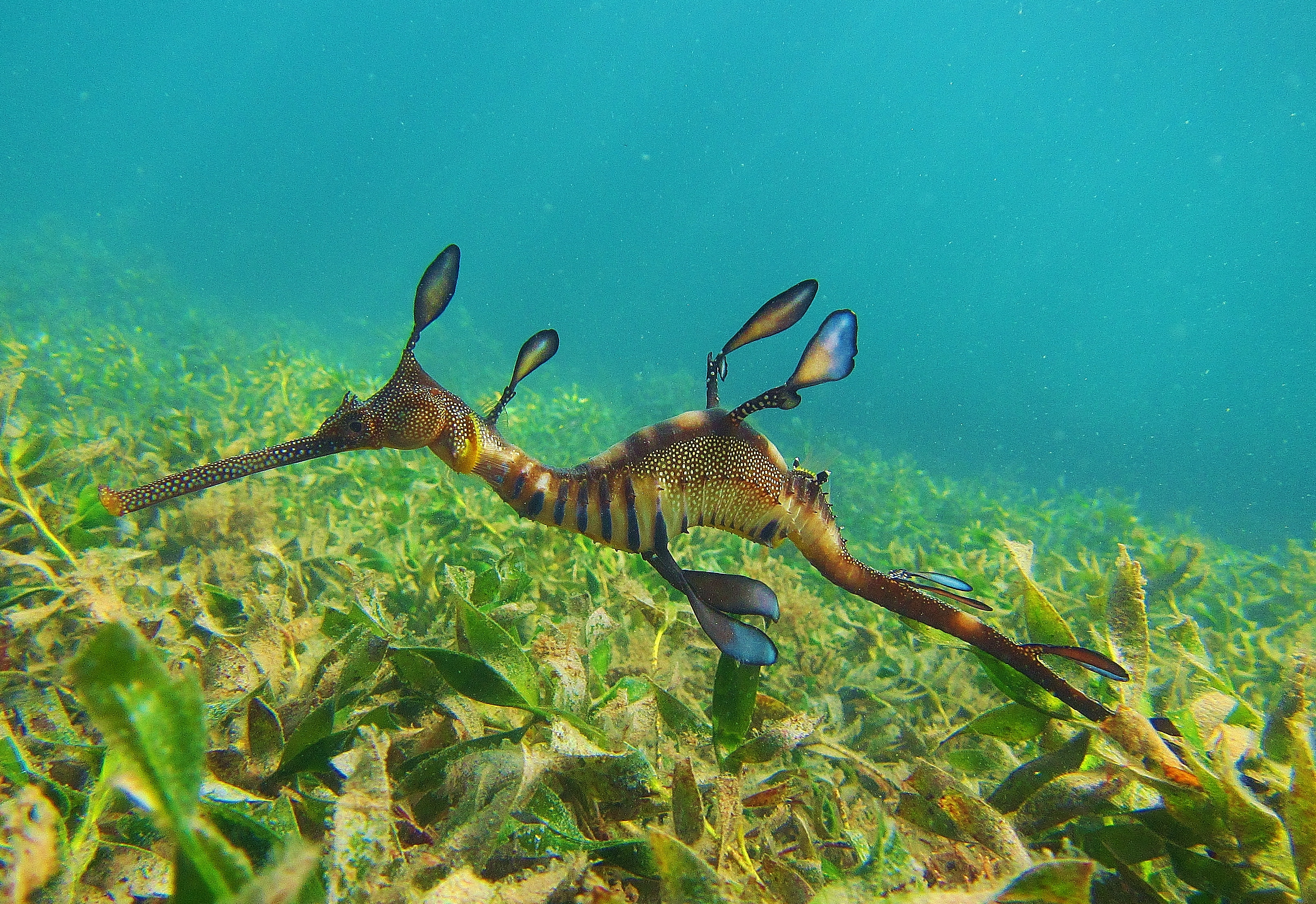
Weedy seadragon, Western Port Bay

It is illegal to take or export these species in most of the states within which they occur. A database of seadragon sightings, known as 'Dragon Search' has been established with support from the Marine Life Society of South Australia Inc., ('Dragon Search' arose as the logical progression of a similar project initiated by the MLSSA, which was the first community group or indeed organisation of any type to adopt the common seadragon's close relative, the leafy seadragon, as part of its logo), the Marine and Coastal Community Network (MCCN), the Threatened Species Network (TSN) and the Australian Marine Conservation Society (AMCS), which encourages divers to report sightings. Monitoring of populations may provide indications of local water quality and seadragons could also become an important 'flagship' species for the often-overlooked richness of the unique flora and fauna of Australia's south coast.

Video of a common seadragon at the South East Asia Aquarium, in the Marine Life Park, Singapore

Captive breeding programs are in place for the weedy seadragon, headed up by Sea Life Melbourne Aquarium. The dragon has been difficult to breed in captivity, though in 2015, research observing the creatures in the wild and trying to replicate the conditions in captivity had researchers making changes to the light, water temperature and water flow proving to be key.

In December 2015, the Melbourne aquarium hatched eggs and the aquarium's weedy seadragon population significantly increased. The aquarium reported in March 2016 that 45 fry were still going strong, a 95% survival rate.

== Related species ==
The common seadragon is in the subfamily Syngnathinae, which contains all pipefish. It is most closely related to the other member of its genus, the ruby seadragon (Phyllopteryx dewysea), and also the leafy seadragon (Phycodurus eques). Haliichthys taeniophorus, sometimes referred to as the "ribboned seadragon" is not closely related (it does not form a true monophyletic clade with weedy and leafy seadragons).

The common seadragon was previously the only member of its genus until the description of the ruby seadragon in 2015.

== Ongoing research ==
In the November 2006 issue of National Geographic magazine, marine biologist Greg Rouse is reported as investigating the DNA variation of the two seadragon species across their ranges.
