= Red Hill railway station =

Former railway station in Victoria, Australia

Coordinates: 38°22′47″S 145°1′36″E

Red Hill

General information
- Line: Red Hill line
- Platforms: 1
- Tracks: 1

Other information
- Status: Closed

History
- Opened: 2 December 1921
- Closed: 1 July 1953

Services
Preceding station	Disused railways	Following station
Merricks	Red Hill line	Terminus
	List of closed railway stations in Melbourne	
Location

Red Hill railway station was the terminus of the Red Hill railway line. The line was opened in 1921 and was one of the more short-lived branch lines on the Victorian Railways, closing in 1953, along with a few other smaller branch lines on the railways system. For a few years after the closure of the line, railmotors continued to run as far as Balnarring, to cater for the Balnarring picnic races and the Lord Somers Camp, as well as an Australian Railway Historical Society tour in 1956.

Part of the railway alignment between the former Red Hill and Merricks stations has been converted into the Red Hill Rail Trail, but the majority of the right-of-way has been sold to adjacent private landholders.
