= Tuerong =

- Town
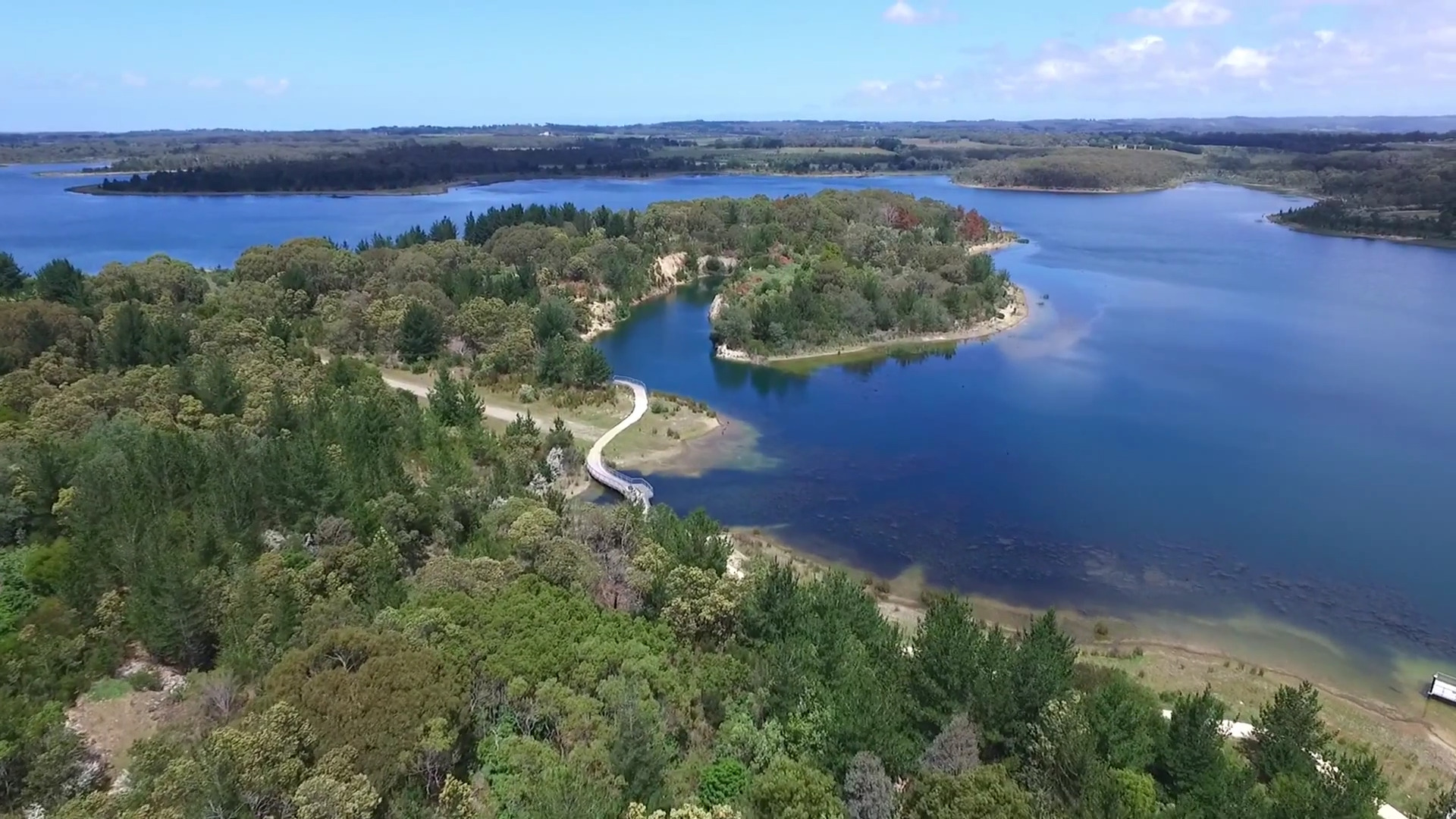
- Devilbend Reservoir in Tuerong

- Interactive map of Tuerong
- Coordinates: 38.300°S 145.105°E
- Country: Australia
- State: Victoria
- LGA: Shire of Mornington Peninsula

Government
  - State electorate: Mornington
  - Federal division: Flinders

Population
  - Total: 357 (2021 census)
- Postcode: 3915
Localities around Tuerong
Mount Martha	Moorooduc	Tyabb
Mount Martha	Tuerong	Hastings
Merricks North	Balnarring	Bittern

Tuerong is a rural locality on the Mornington Peninsula near Melbourne, Victoria, Australia, 55 km (34 mi) south-east of Melbourne's Central Business District, located within the Shire of Mornington Peninsula local government area. Tuerong recorded a population of 357 at the 2021 census.

Tuerong lies inland between the coastal towns of Mount Martha and Hastings, south of Moorooduc.

== Geography ==
The predominant physical feature of the locality is the Devilbend Reservoir with a capacity of 14,600 megalitres (11,800 acre⋅ft), though no longer in use for water supply purposes.

== History ==
Tuerong was the name of a squatting run of an estimated 12000 acres that lay between Yuille's to the north, Balcombe's, Jamieson's (Special Survey) and McCrae's to the west, Coolart to the east, and Tuck's to the south. William Dawson was an early squatter and was followed briefly by Hall and McKenzie and then John Miller in 1850, before Ralph Ruddell obtained the lease in about 1856. He fattened cattle on the lush pastures and had no trouble with water supply because of the network of "never-failing creeks and springs," but became insolvent by early 1861. The Butler and Brooke directory shows that Vaughan and Wild were on Tuerong in 1866-7. The 640 acre pre-emptive right, reduced to 600 acres because of land required for Government roads, became known as Tuerong Park. It is known that J.B.Wilson was at Tuerong Park by 1874 when John and his wife, Agnes, James Firth, and John McCusker were all witnesses in the case of the Schnapper Point Murder (which should have been called the Tuerong or Tubbarubba murder) John died, and his widow Agnes died on 27 January 1894 at Tanti Rd, Mornington. Later owners of Tuerong Park were: Crook, Pitt, Matthew (approx. 1907 - 1917), Andrews, Dobie, Clark, Moore, Nutchey, Paton (who named one of his racehorses Tuerong), and Edgar (who made it a venue for the polo set in the 1950s).

The Tuerong homestead, built in the late 1800s, is now the restaurant and office of the Dromana Estate at Tuerong Winery. Francis Gillett, grantee of land adjoining Tuerong Park, is recalled by the name of a road near the reservoir. He designed Manyung in Mt Eliza and built Sunnyside nearby.(Shire of Mornington Heritage Study P.16.) South of his property was Thomas Renison's 240 acre grant, where a race meeting was conducted in 1868; when advertised in the Argus on 9-12-1950, it was called "Tuerong Valley," and the quarry was bringing in four pounds a week. Renison owned the Schnapper Point Hotel on the Esplanade in Mornington (The Royal). Other pioneers of the Tuerong area were James Connell, John McCusker and Peter White (whose son-in-law, John Bourne, later had the same farm for another 50 years). Old Moorooduc Rd was known for countless decades as Three Chain Rd and was originally the main road to Dromana. The name came about because the road was three chains or 60 metres wide. (Most details come from articles from the Argus found in the National Library's "Trove".Details about Rennison and Gillett from the heritage study and the race meeting details from P. 109 of A Dreamtime of Dromana.)

== See also ==
- List of Melbourne suburbs
- Mornington Peninsula
