= Frankston-Baxter Trail =

The Frankston-Baxter Trail is a shared-use bicycle trail running along Melbourne's Stony Point railway line between outer suburban Frankston and the township of Baxter. At the Frankston end, it connects to a number of nearby trails, but it terminates abruptly at Golf Links Rd without actually connecting to Baxter. There is thus a gap to the nearby bike path from Somerville to Balnarring via Hastings.

The surface is asphalt for the full length, although during construction of Peninsula Link a portion of unsealed path existed through the construction site.

The trail is also a link between Frankston and the Peninsula Link Trail.
