= Bittern railway station =

Railway station in Melbourne, Australia

Bittern
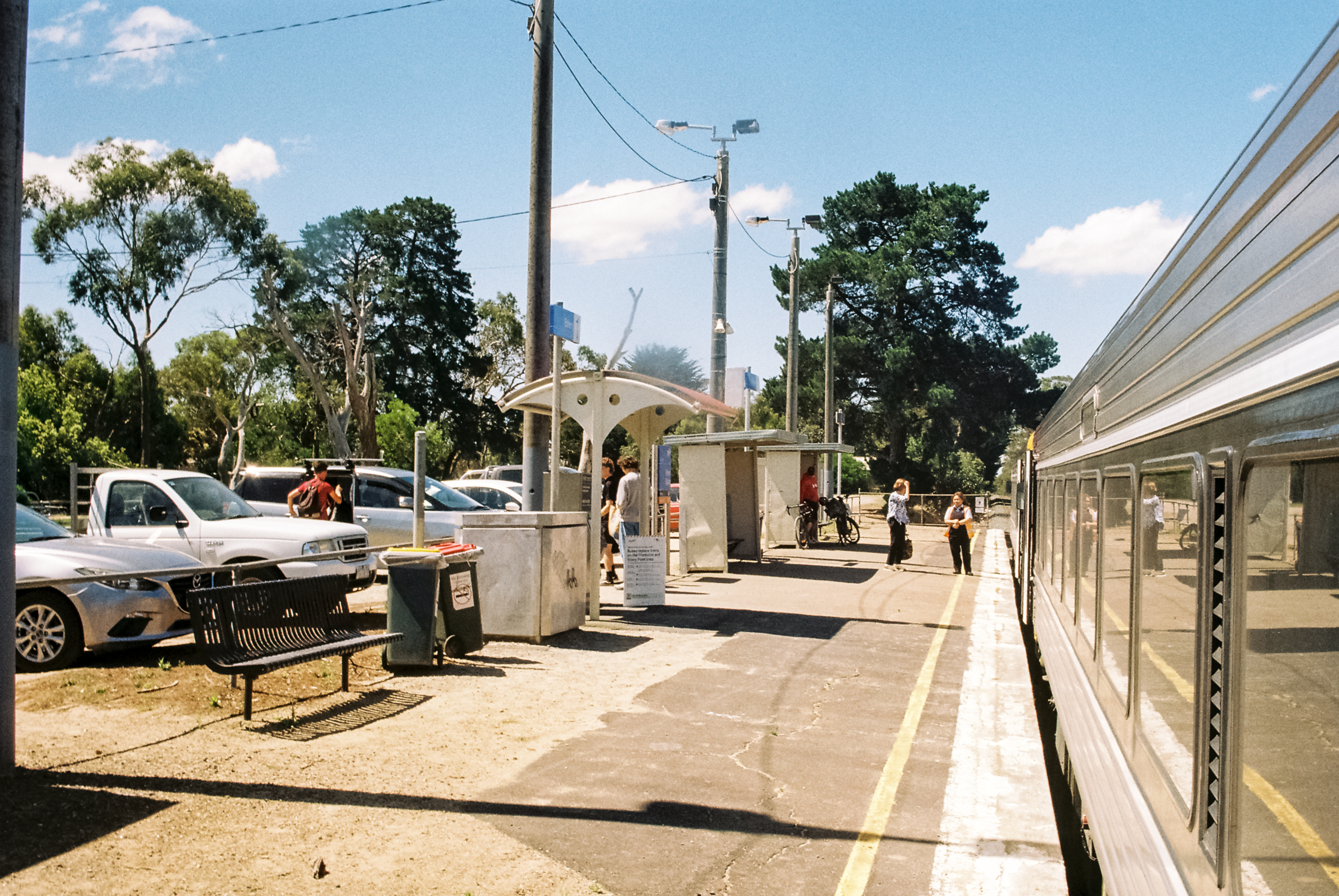
- Northbound view from the station platform, with a V/Line Sprinter at the platform, December 2024

General information
- Location: Frankston-Flinders Road, Bittern, Victoria 3918; Shire of Mornington Peninsula; Australia
- Coordinates: 38°20′14″S 145°10′41″E
- System: PTV commuter rail station
- Owner: VicTrack
- Operator: Metro Trains
- Line: Stony Point
- Distance: 68.67 kilometres from Southern Cross
- Platforms: 1
- Tracks: 1
- Connections: Bus

Construction
- Structure type: Ground
- Parking: Yes
- Accessible: Yes—step free access

Other information
- Status: Operational, unstaffed
- Station code: BIT
- Fare zone: Myki zone 2
- Website: Public Transport Victoria

History
- Opened: 17 December 1889; 136 years ago
- Closed: 22 June 1981
- Rebuilt: 27 September 1984; February 1986

Passengers
- 2015–2016: 16,202
- 2016–2017: 14,344 ▼11.46%
- 2017–2018: 13,165 ▼8.21%
- 2018–2019: 14,788 ▲12.32%
- 2019–2020: 9,400 ▼36.43%
- 2020–2021: 5,350 ▼43.08%
- 2021–2022: 4,600 ▼14.01%
- 2022–2023: 7,050 ▲53.26%
- 2023–2024: 7,850 ▲11.35%
- 2024–2025: 8,800 ▲12.1%

Services
Preceding station	Metro Trains	Following station
Hastings towards Frankston	Stony Point line	Morradoo towards Stony Point
Former services
Preceding station	Disused railways	Following station
Junction	Red Hill branch	Balnarring
	List of closed railway stations in Melbourne	
Track layout
Location

Bittern station is a railway station operated by Metro Trains Melbourne on the Stony Point line, part of the Melbourne rail network. It serves the town of Bittern in Victoria, Australia. Bittern is a ground level unstaffed station, featuring one side platform. It opened on 17 December 1889, with the current station provided in 1986. It initially closed on 22 June 1981, then reopened on 27 September 1984.

== History ==
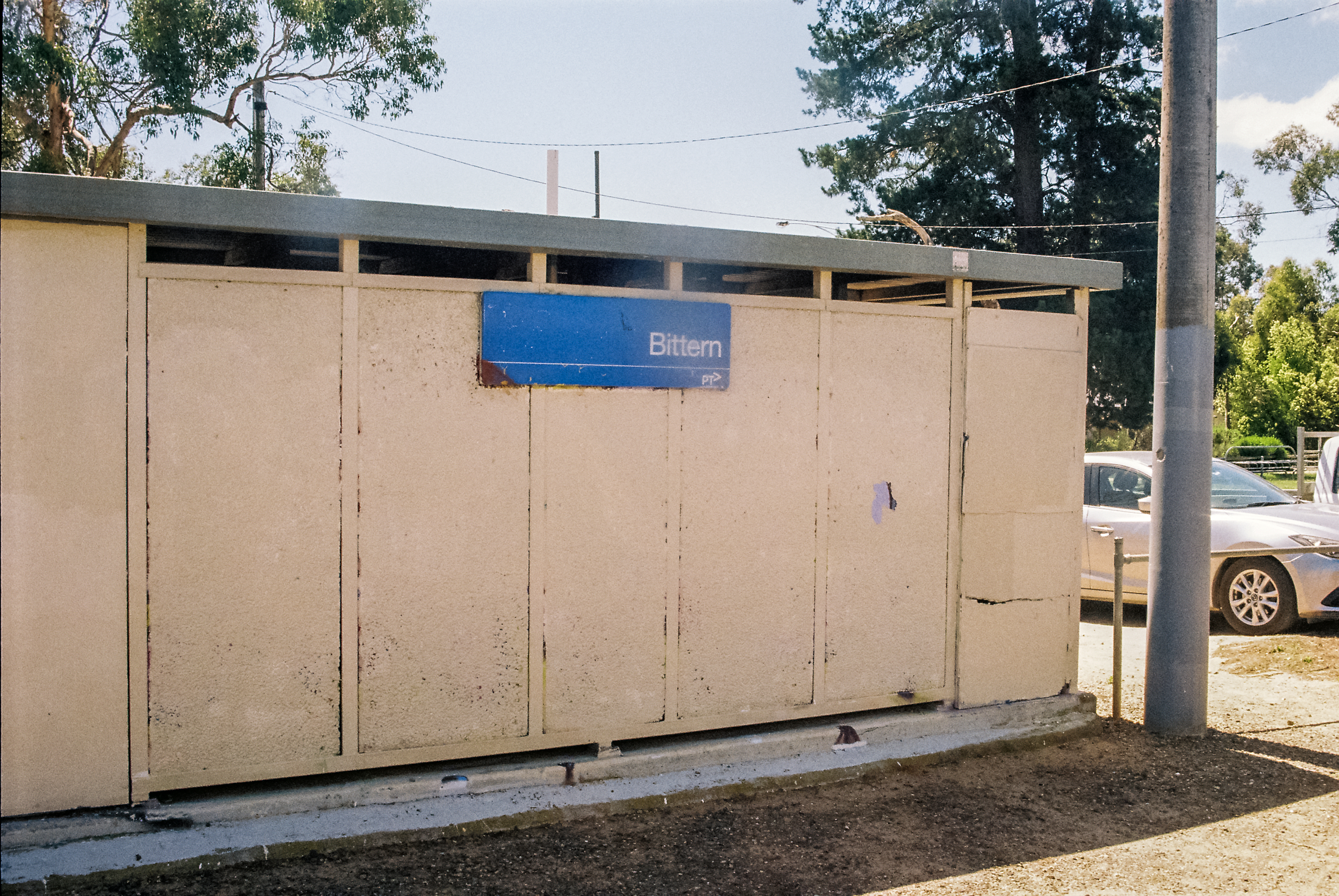
Bike shed

Bittern station opened on 17 December 1889, when the railway line from Hastings was extended to Stony Point. Like the town itself, the station was named after the bird family of the same name.

Between 1921 and 1953, Bittern was the junction for a branch line to Red Hill.

On 22 June 1981, the passenger service between Frankston and Stony Point was withdrawn and replaced with a bus service, with the line between Long Island Junction and Stony Point also closing on the same day. On 16 September 1984, promotional trips for the reopening of the line began and, on 27 September of that year, the passenger service was reinstated. Also occurring in that year, flashing light signals were provided at the nearby Woolleys Road level crossing, located in the down direction of the station. In February 1986, the current passenger shelters were provided, replacing the original timber station building.

In 1991, a siding at the station was abolished.

In 2010, boom barriers were provided at the Woolleys Road level crossing.

== Platforms and services ==
Bittern has one platform. It is serviced by Metro Trains' Stony Point line services.

Bittern platform arrangement
Platform	Line	Destination	Service Type	Source
1	Stony Point line	Frankston, Stony Point	All stations	

== Transport links ==
Ventura Bus Lines operates one bus route via Bittern station, under contract to Public Transport Victoria:

- 782 : Frankston station – Flinders
