= Devilbend Natural Features Reserve =

Nature reserve park in Australia

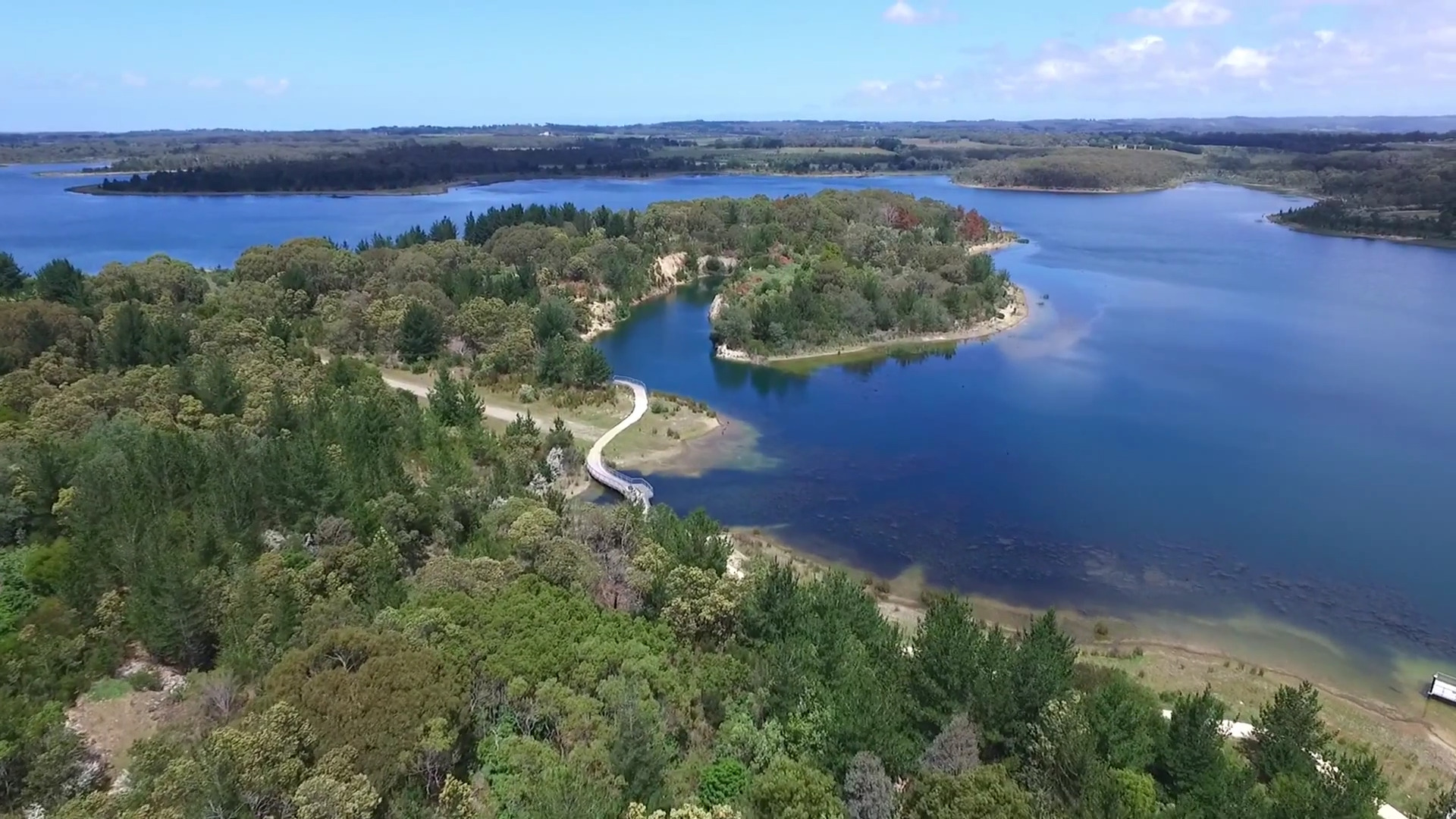
- Devilbend Reservoir Park

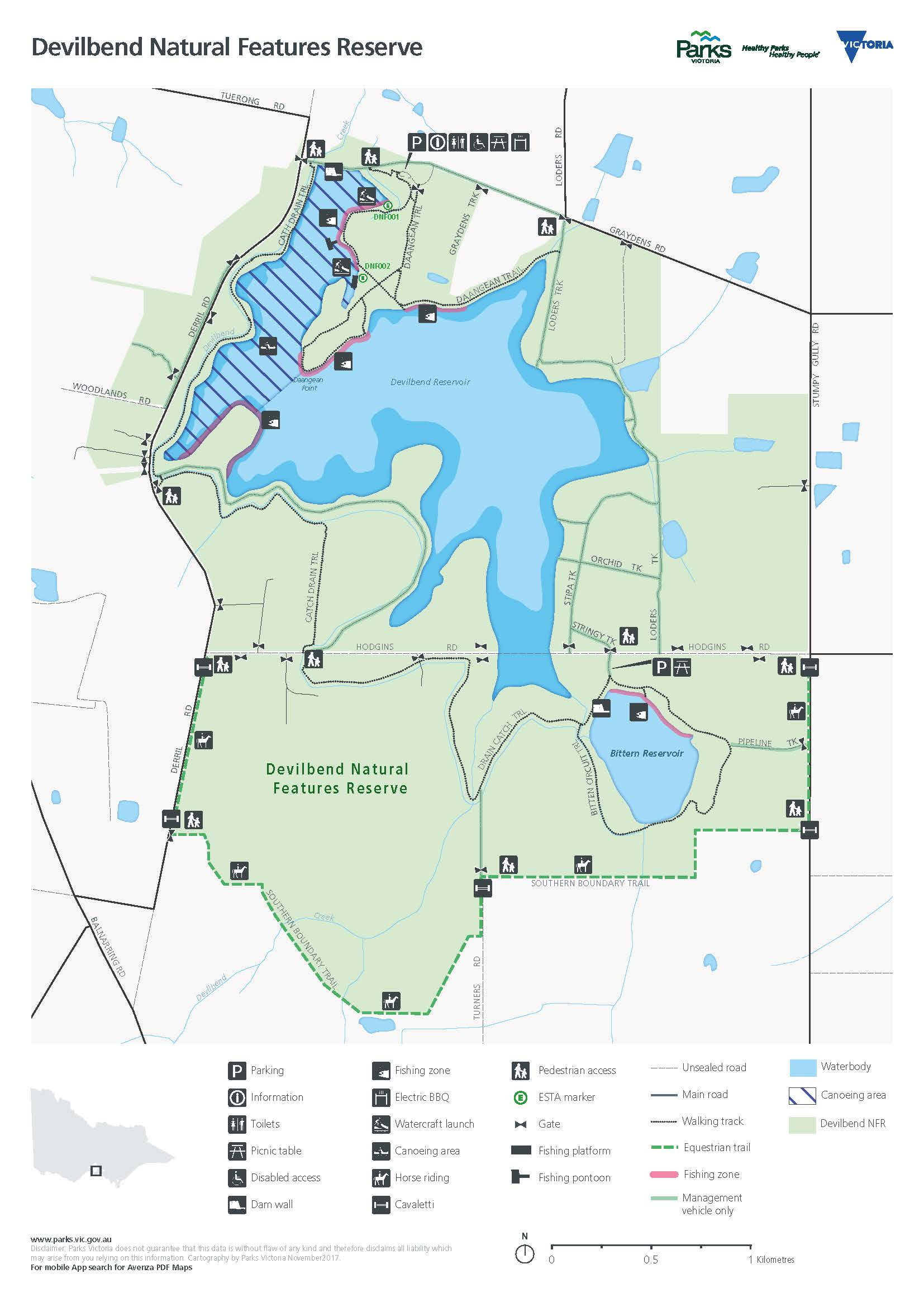
- Devilbend Reserve map (© Parks Victoria, November 2017)
- Type: Natural reserve
- Location: Mornington Peninsula, Victoria, Australia
- Nearest city: Melbourne
- Coordinates: 38°17′15″S 145°06′16″E
- Area: 1,005 ha (2,480 acres)
- Created: 8 March 2007
- Status: Open

The Devilbend Natural Features Reserve is a 1,005-hectare (2,480-acre) natural reserve park in the rural locality of Tuerong on the Mornington Peninsula in central southern Victoria, Australia, 55 km (34 mi) southeast of the state capital Melbourne's city center.

The park contains two decommissioned water supply reservoirs, the Devilbend Reservoir and Bittern Reservoir, which are less than 600 m (660 yd) apart and linked by an often-dry drainage channel. These reservoirs were the original reason the surrounding parkland was protected from general public access and was not subjected to land development. Both reservoirs are along the course of the eponymous Devilbend Creek, a left tributary of the much larger Balcombe Creek that drains into Port Phillip Bay at Mount Martha. Nearby just 500 m (550 yd) in the north, there is a much smaller, unnamed third lake further downstream along the creek in the neighbouring locality of Moorooduc, next to a golf course within what is known as the Devilbend Recreation Reserve.

== History ==
Devilbend Reservoir
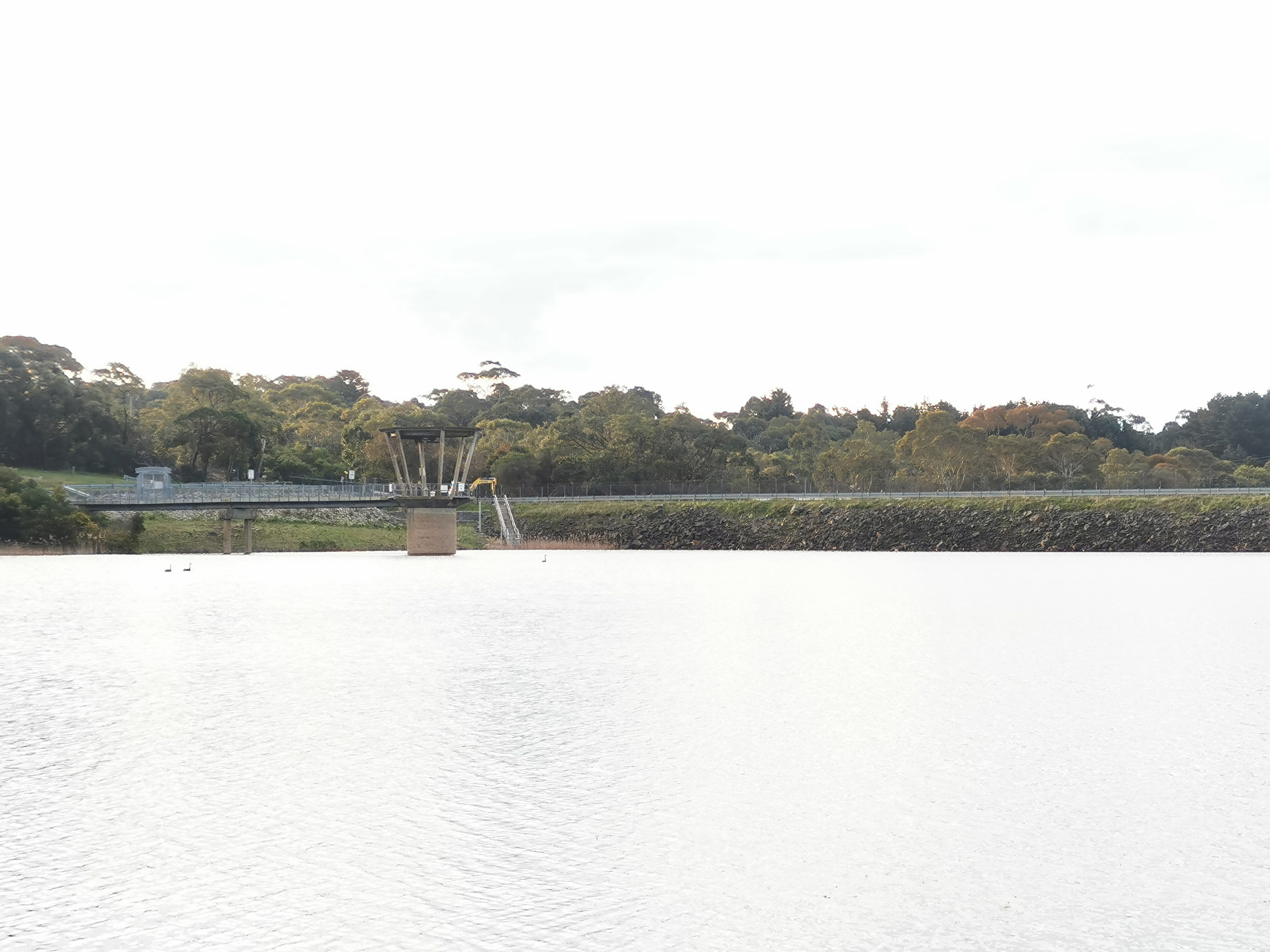
- The levee and intake tower on the northern edge of the reservoir
- Country: Australia
- Location: Victoria
- Coordinates: 38°16′41″S 145°06′00″E
- Purpose: Water supply
- Status: Decommissioned
- Opening date: 1965
- Built by: State Rivers & Water Supply Commission
- Owner: Melbourne Water

Dam and spillways
- Type of dam: Earth fill dam
- Impounds: Balcombe Creek
- Height (foundation): 29 m (95 ft)
- Length: 275 m (902 ft)
- Dam volume: 222×10^{3} m^{3} (7.8×10^{6} cu ft)
- Spillways: 1
- Spillway type: Uncontrolled
- Spillway capacity: 40 m^{3}/s (1,400 cu ft/s)

Reservoir
- Total capacity: 14,600 ML (11,800 acre⋅ft)
- Catchment area: 23 km^{2} (8.9 sq mi)
- Surface area: 243 ha (600 acres)

The Devilbend Natural Features Reserve is located within the traditional country of the Bunurong people, part of the indigenous Kulin nation.

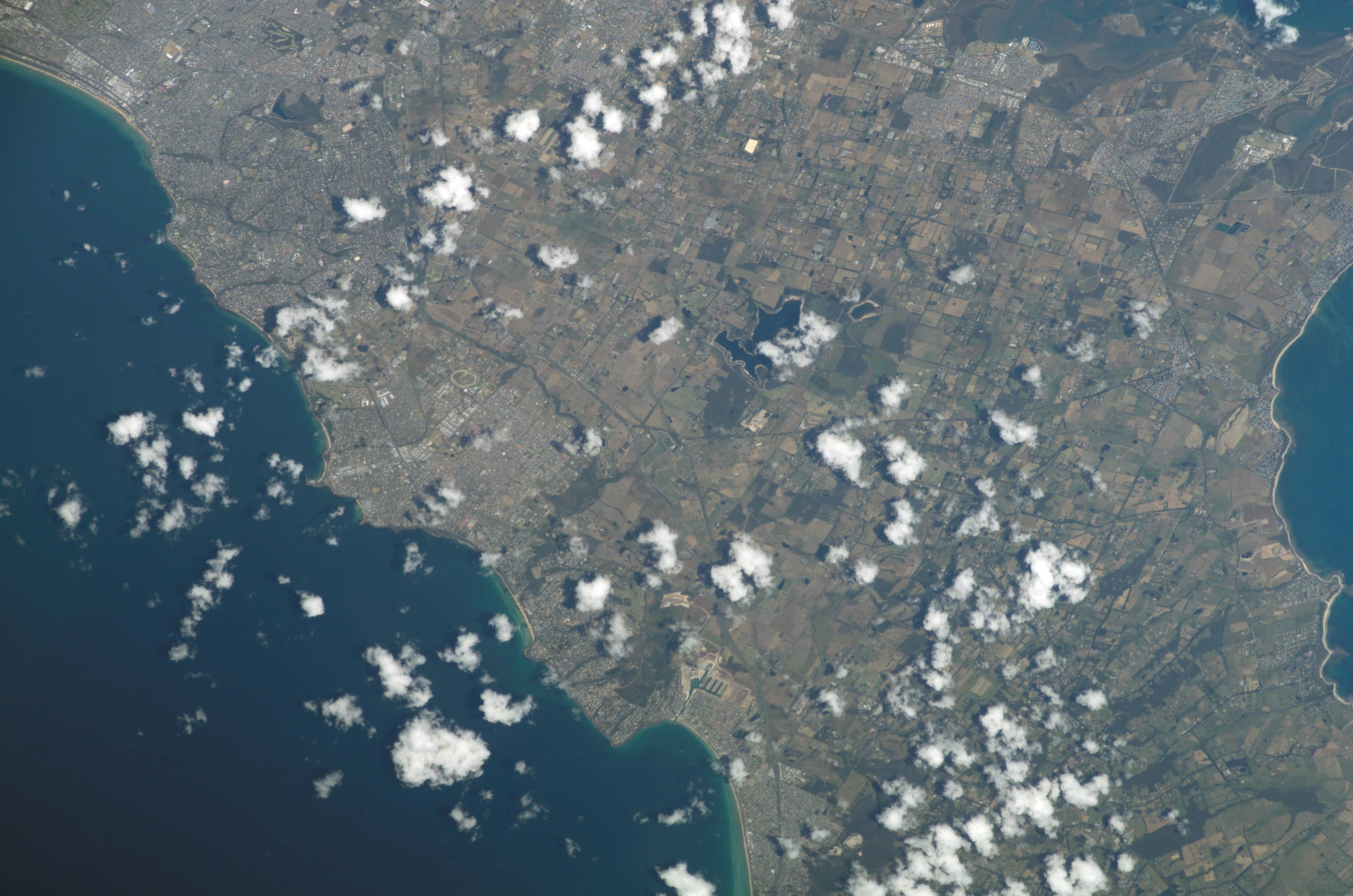
Orbital view of the Mornington Peninsula around the Devilbend Reserve (just right of the center) taken during ISS Expedition 16.

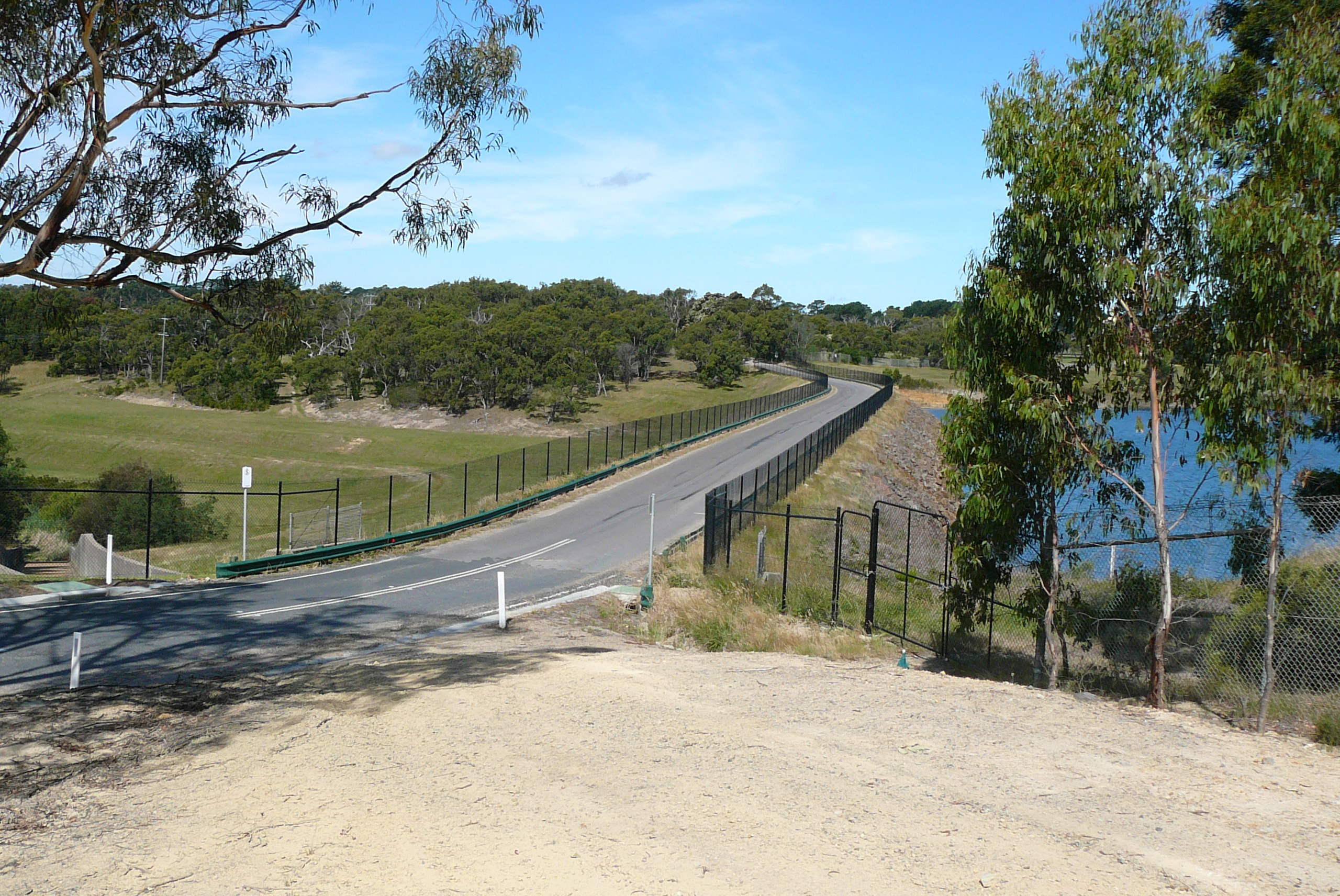
Graydens Road causeway across the reserve.

The Bittern Reservoir, the smaller of the two reservoirs with a capacity of 573 ML (20.2×10^{6} cu ft), was built in the 1930s. The much larger Devilbend Reservoir, with an area of 243 ha (600 acres) and a capacity of 14,600 ML (11,800 acre⋅ft), was built during the 1960s and opened in 1965, and is currently the largest freshwater body in the Shire of Mornington Peninsula. The two reservoirs provided backup drinking water to the Mornington Peninsula until the completion of a water pipeline between the Cardinia Reservoir and Pearcedale in December 2000 made them redundant. In September 2006, most of the reservoir land was transferred to Parks Victoria with the Devilbend Natural Features Reserve being gazetted on 8 March 2007. A management plan for the reserve was voted in 2010, and in 2011 a new masterplan aiming to turn the area into a tourist area was prepared.

The Devilbend Foundation was created in 2002 to lobby against recreational fishing in the Devilbend Reserve, and against horseriding in the vicinity, arguing it would compromise the natural equilibrium of the park.

In 2012, after 6 years of land renovation that required a budget of $1.6 million, the reserve reopened to the public. The reserve was inaugurated by Peter Walsh, and took the name Devilbend Natural Features Reserve on this day. Among the new features of the park are the entrance gateway, the asphalt entrance road, sealed car park, the picnic and barbecue facilities, the walking tracks and the boardwalk.

== Environment ==
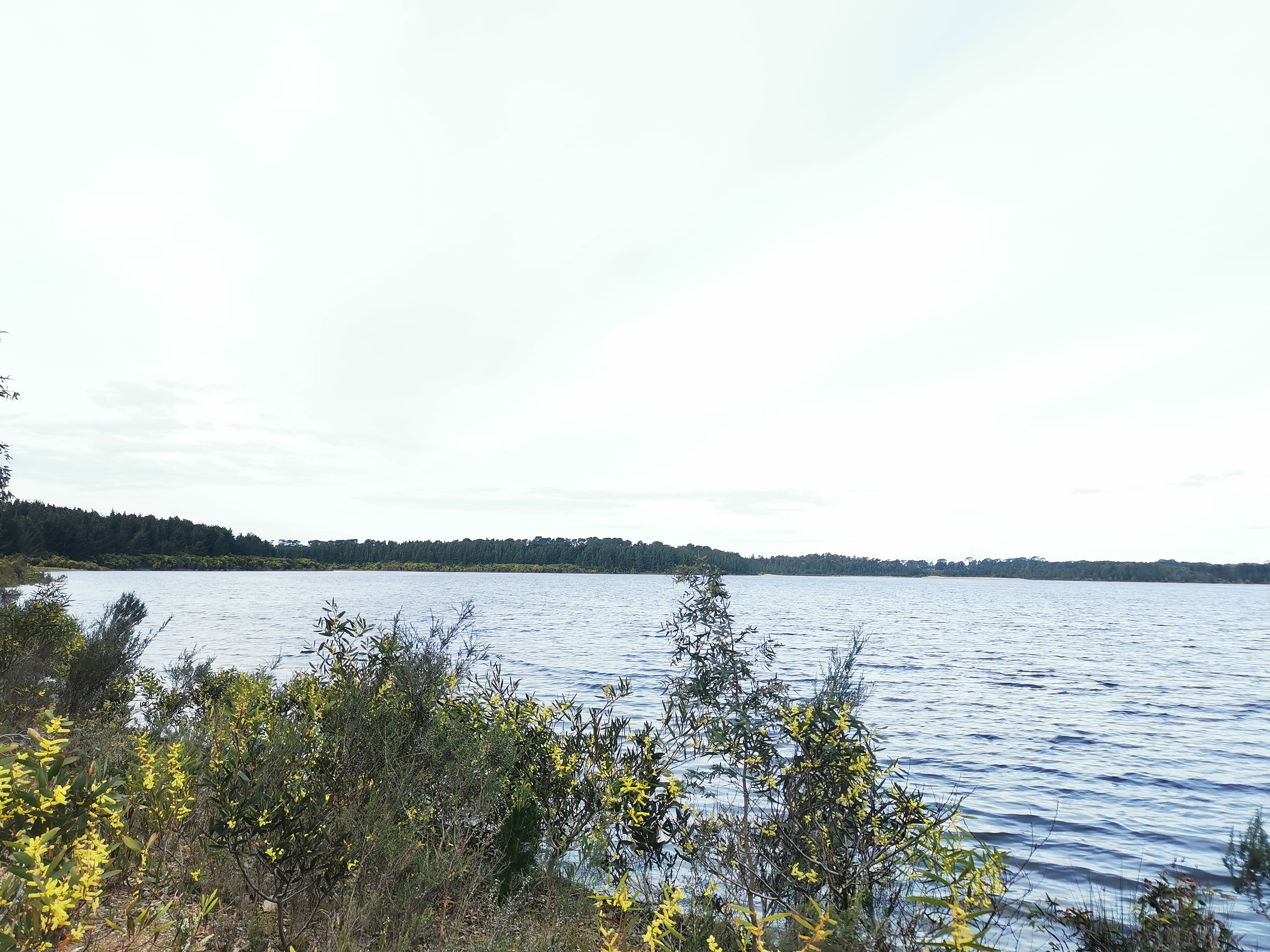
The southern, main part of Devilbend Reservoir, viewed from Daangean Point

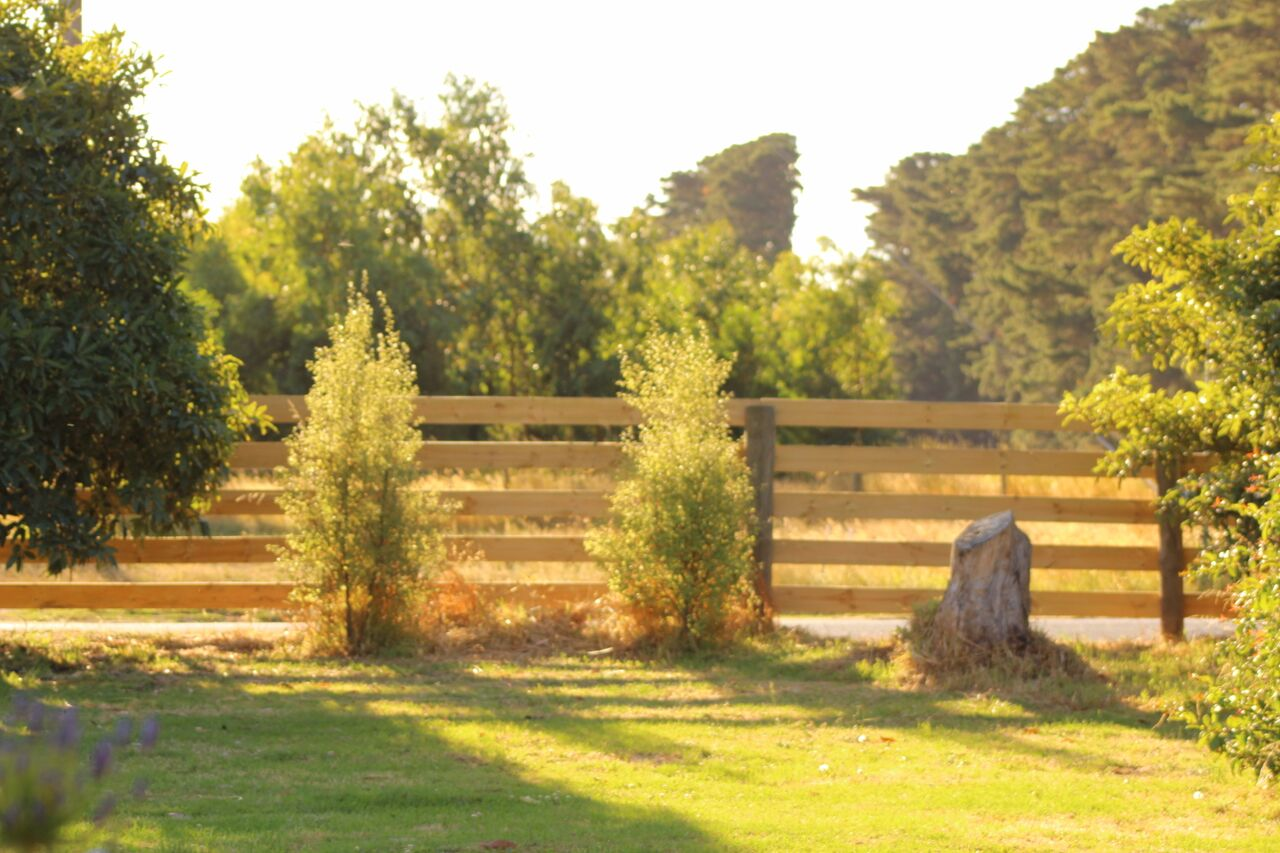
Residential backyard backing onto the reservoir

Much of the Mornington Peninsula's native bushland has been cleared, and it is estimated that less than 5% of the original habitat remains. Devilbend is one of just a few sites on the Peninsula containing significant areas of these remnant native vegetation. Over 200 species of indigenous plants have been recorded in and around the reserve, including trees, shrubs, ground plants, aquatics, orchids and their associated communities. Other sizeable fragments of bushland remaining on the Peninsula are at Point Nepean (333 ha (820 acres)), Green's Bush (1,100 ha (2,700 acres)) and HMAS Cerberus (1,700 ha (4,200 acres)).

Past restrictions on public access to the Devilbend Reserve have created favourable conditions for wildlife, as shown by large numbers of waterbirds and frogs recorded there. The 243 ha (600 acres) Devilbend Reservoir has been identified by BirdLife International as an Important Bird Area (IBA) because it supports, seasonally, over 1% of the global population of the near-threatened blue-billed duck. The reserve also contains the only nesting site of the white-bellied sea eagle on the Mornington Peninsula. The growling grass frog and dwarf galaxias have been recorded in the reserve.

44 species of birds were inventoried in the Reserve. In 2005, 140 indigenous plant species were inventoried.

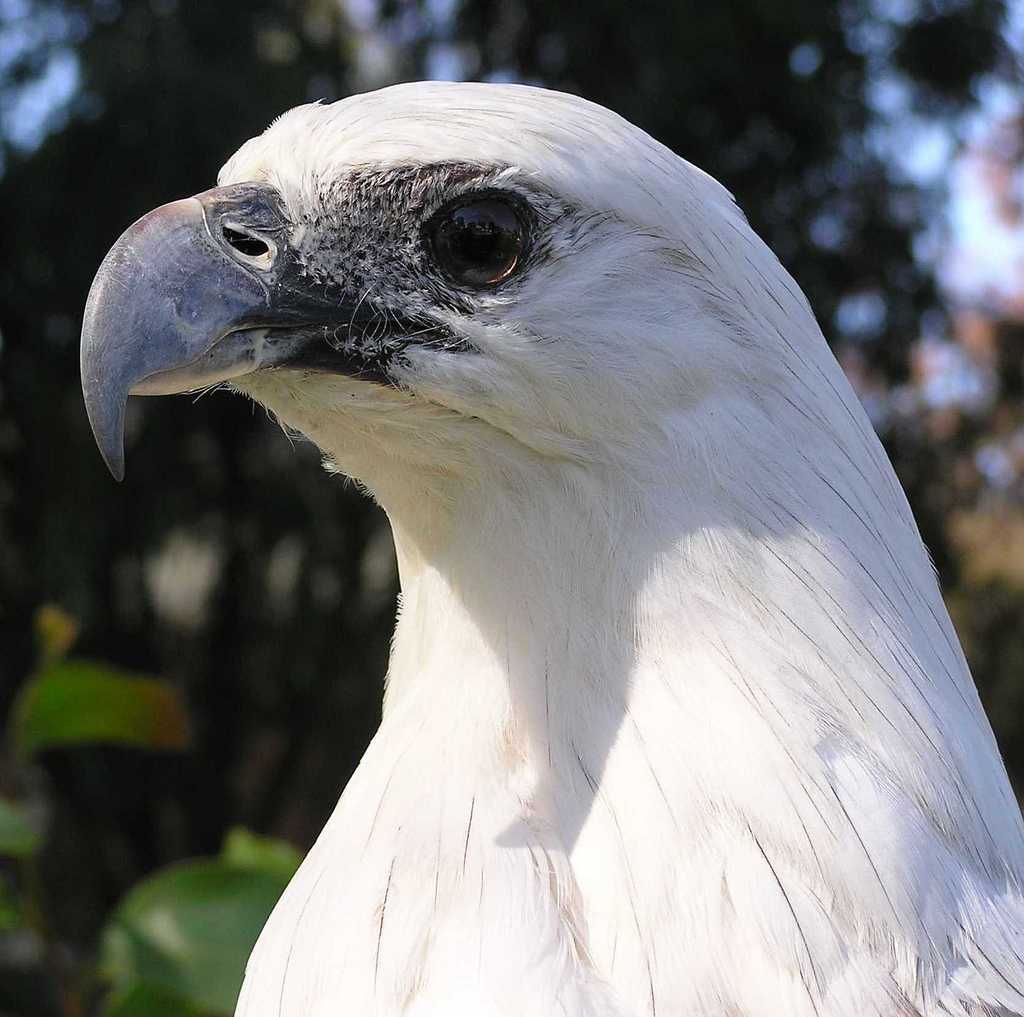
The reserve contains the only nesting site of the white-bellied sea eagle on the Mornington Peninsula.

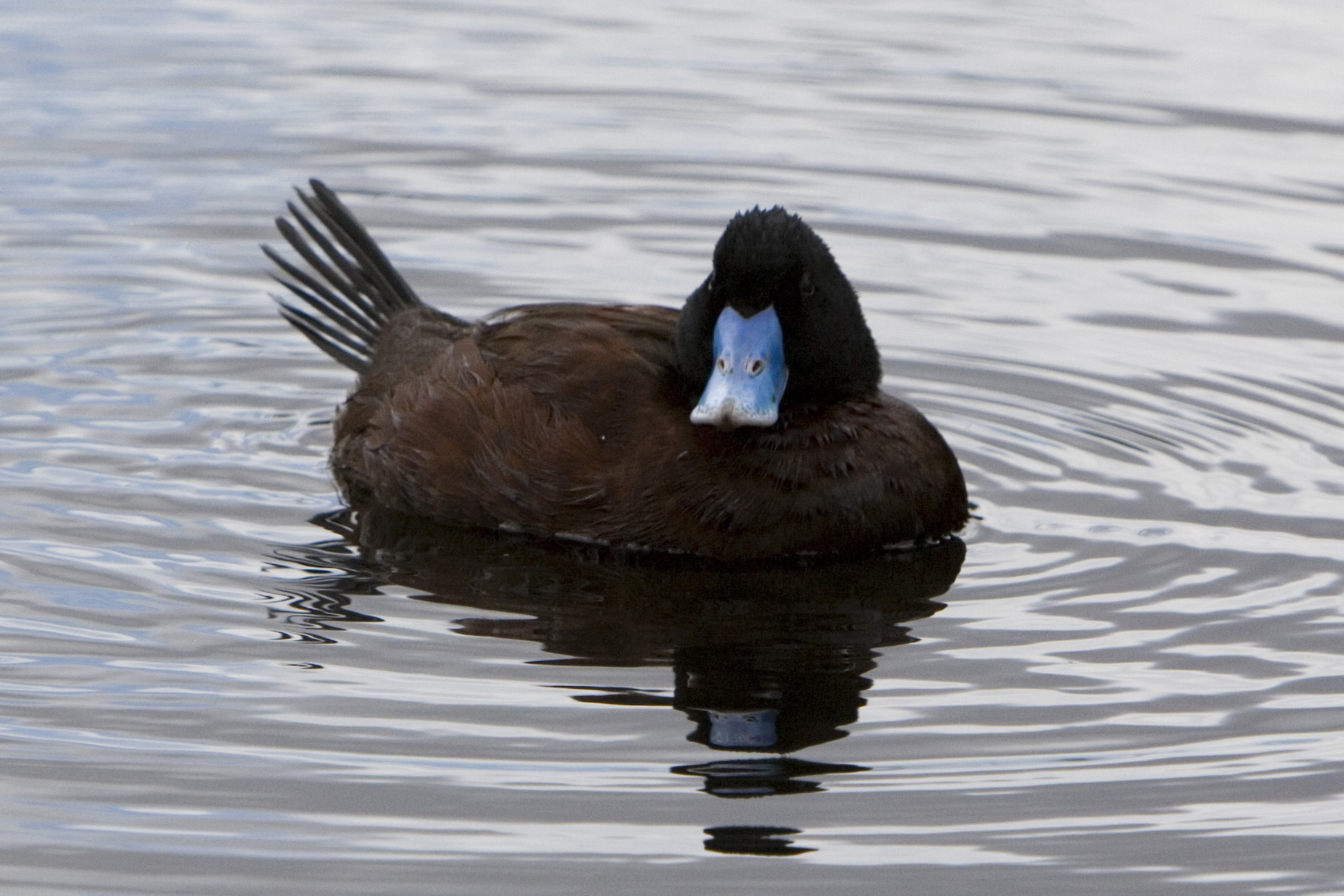
The reserve is an important seasonal site for blue-billed ducks.

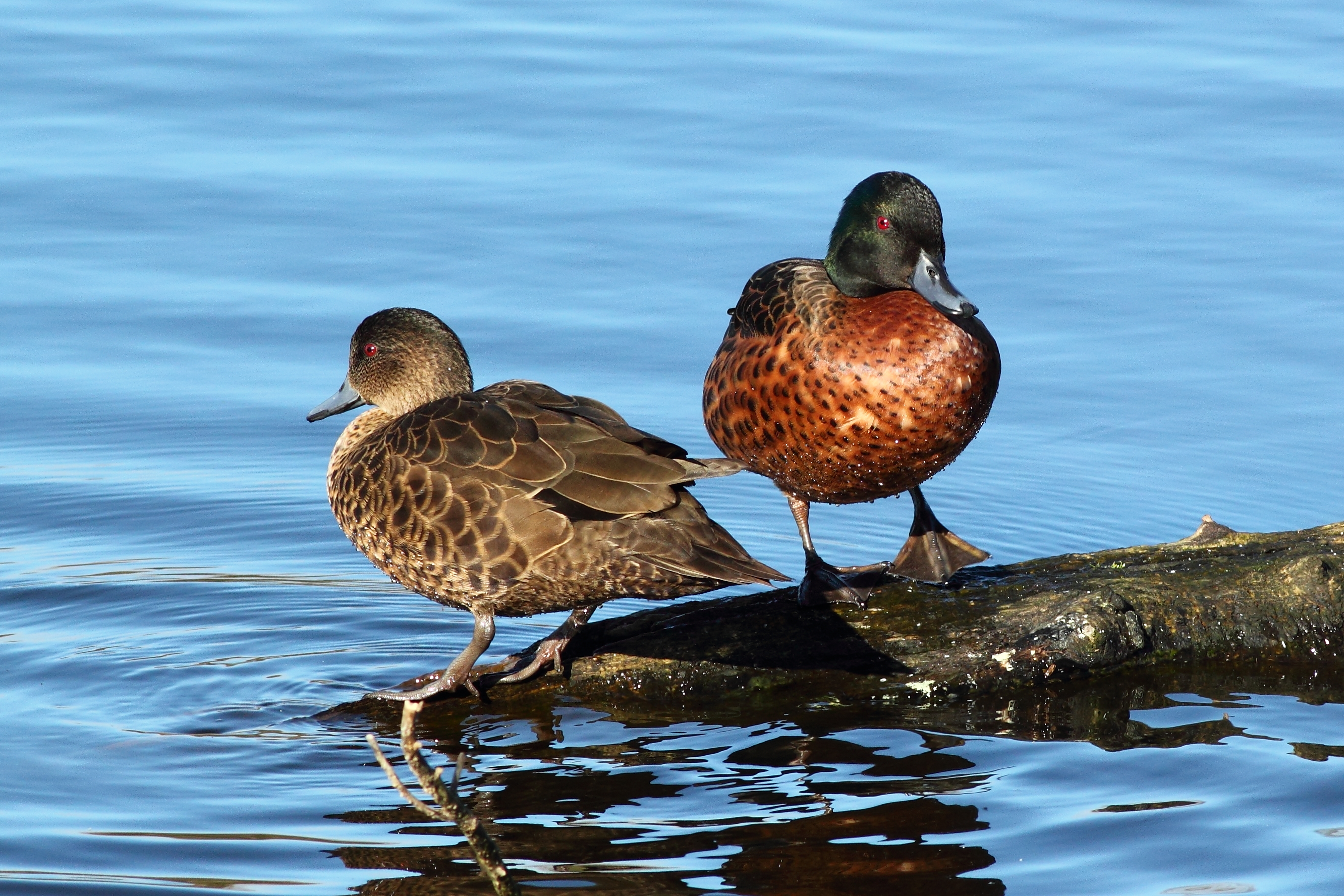
Chestnut teal

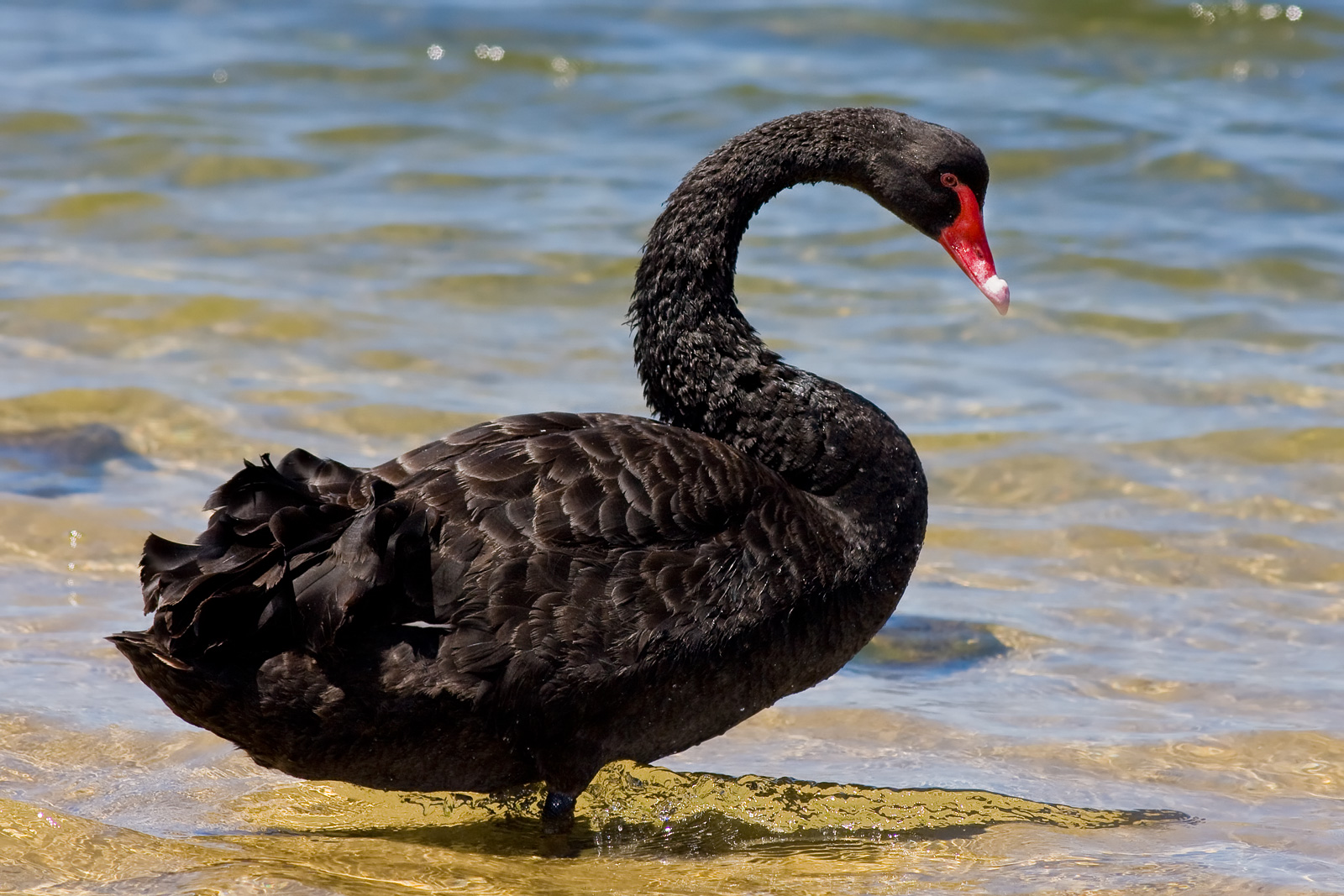
Black swan

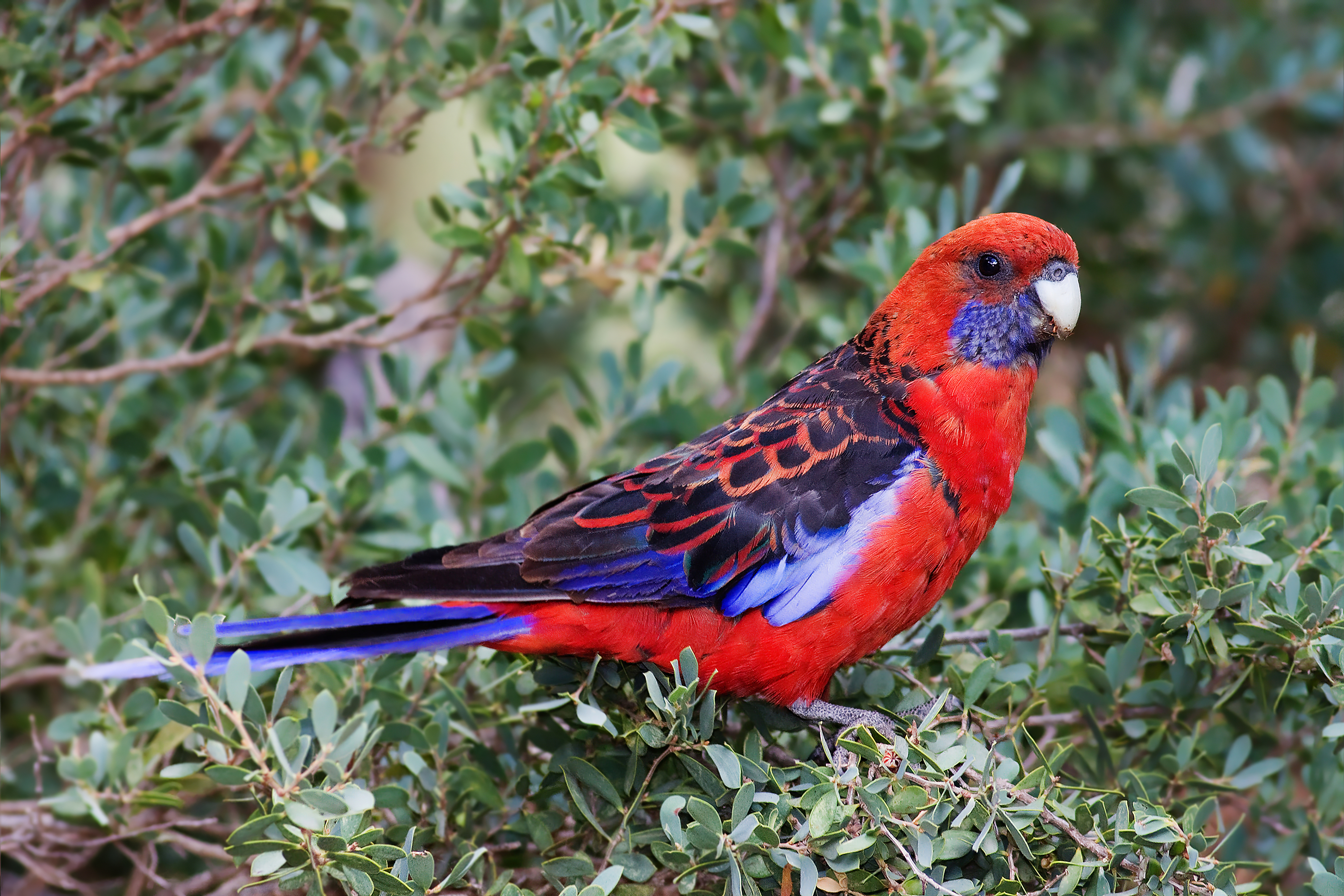
Crimson rosella is a common sight in Devilbend Reserve

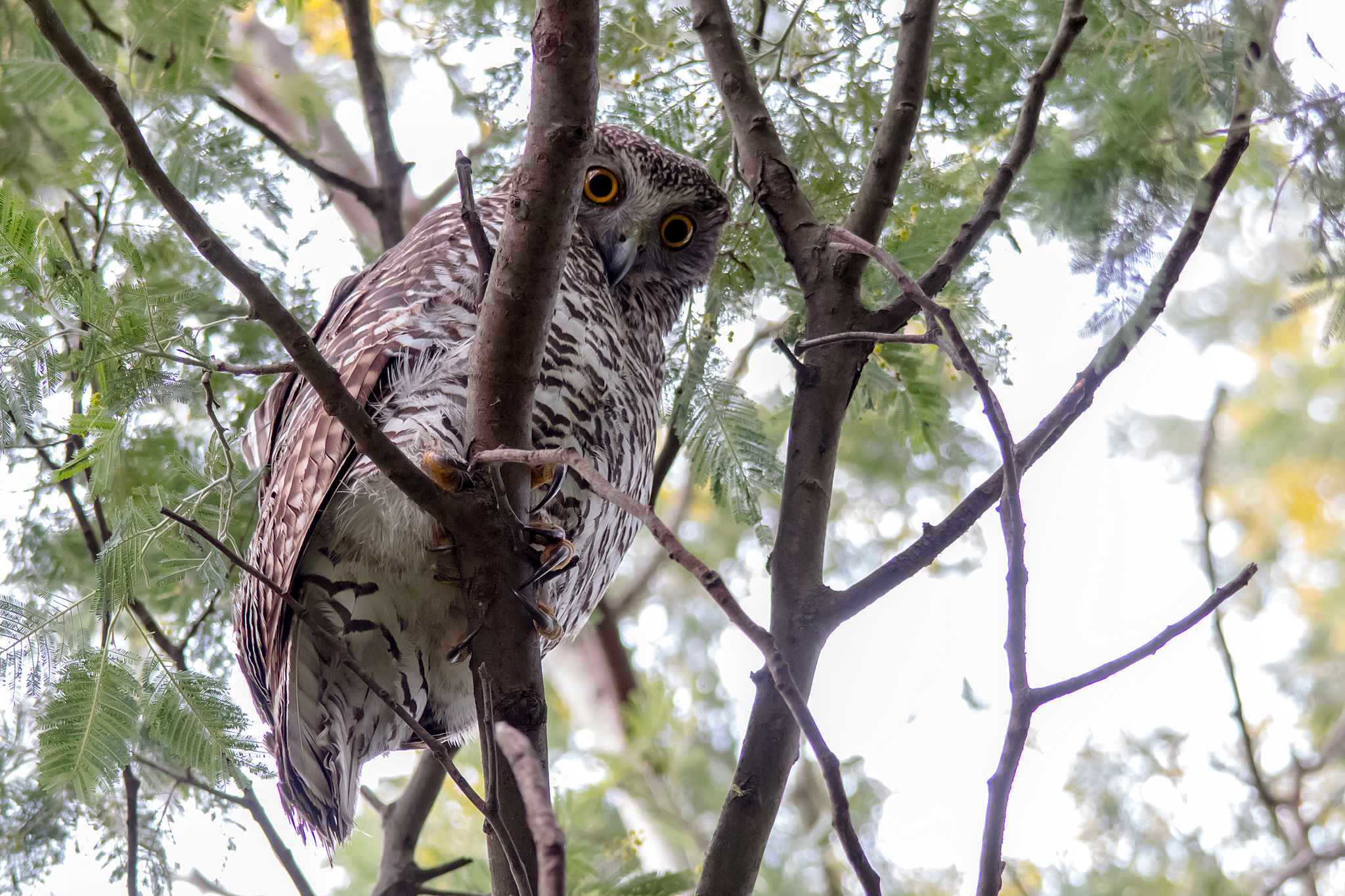
Powerful owl

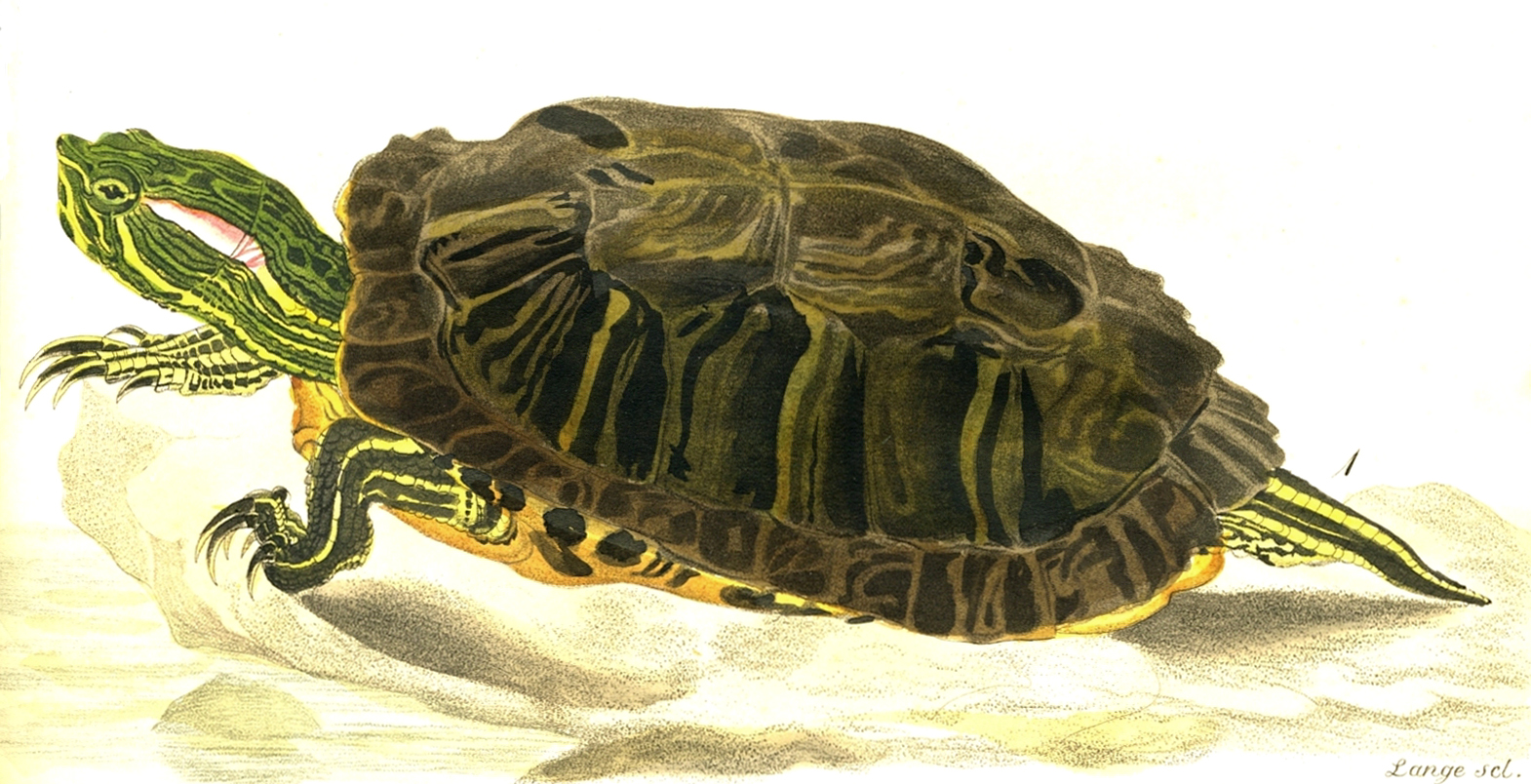
Red-eared slider turtles were also spotted in the reserve.

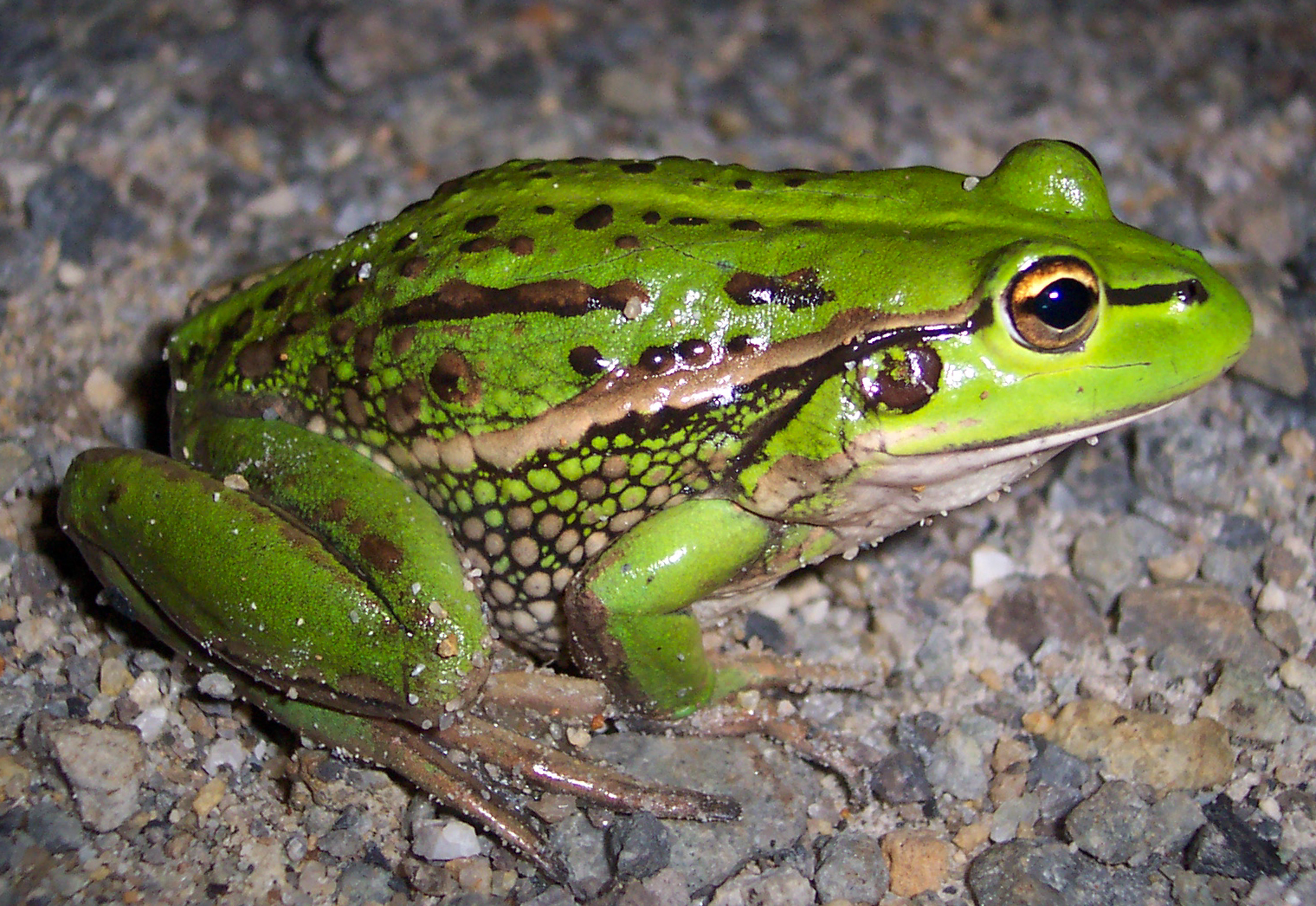
Growling grass frog has been recorded in the reserve.

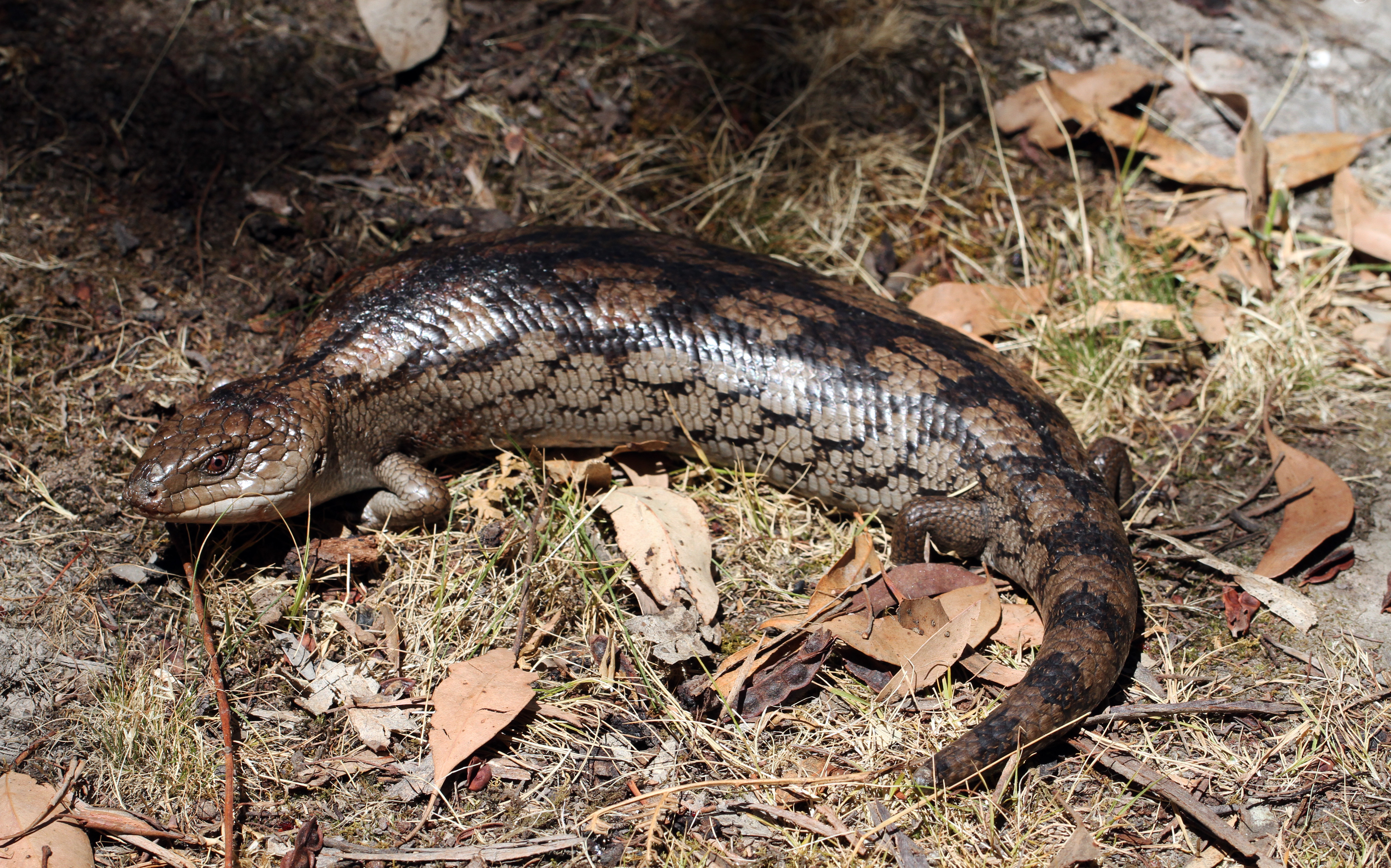
Blue tongue skink

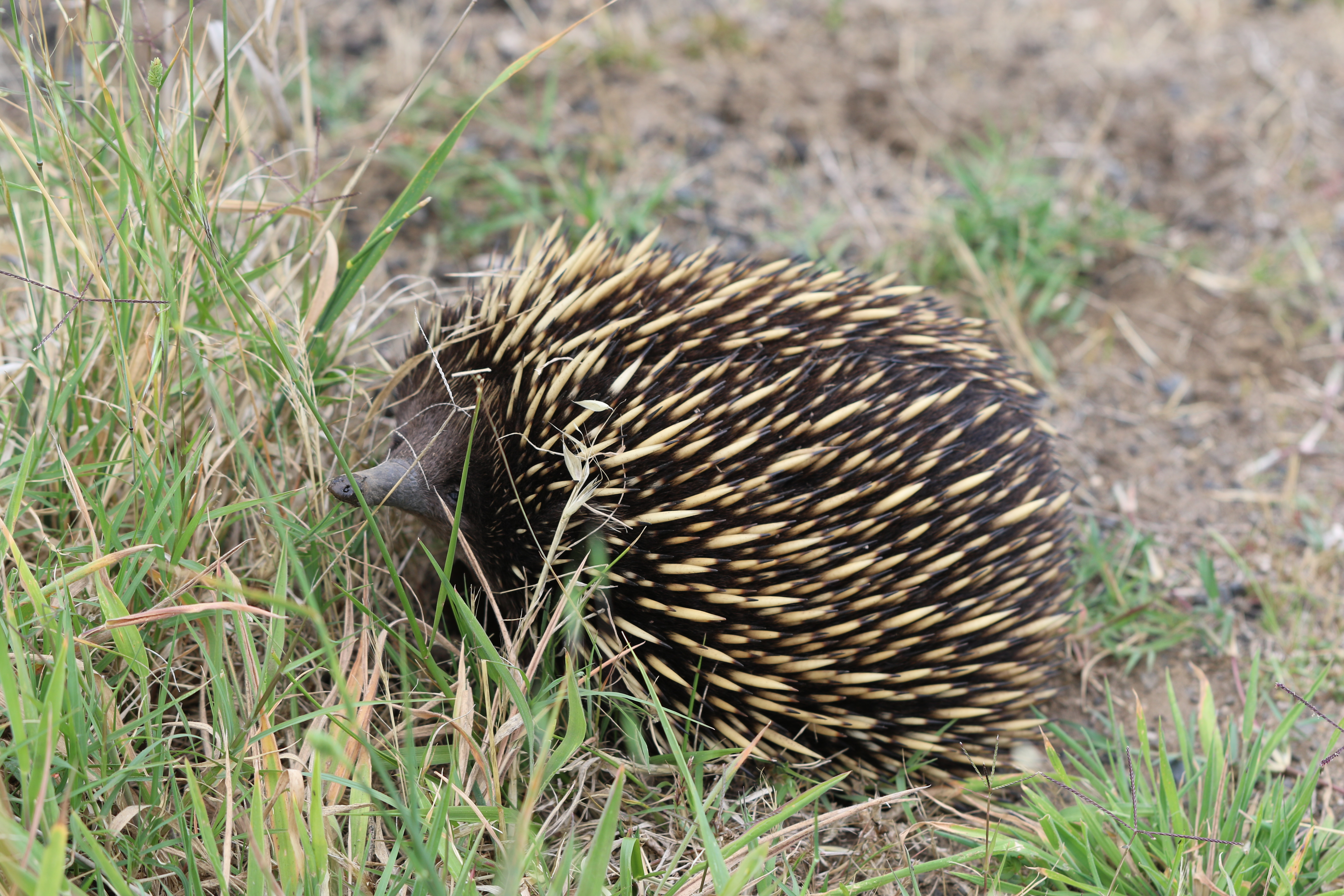
Short-beaked echidna

== Recreation ==
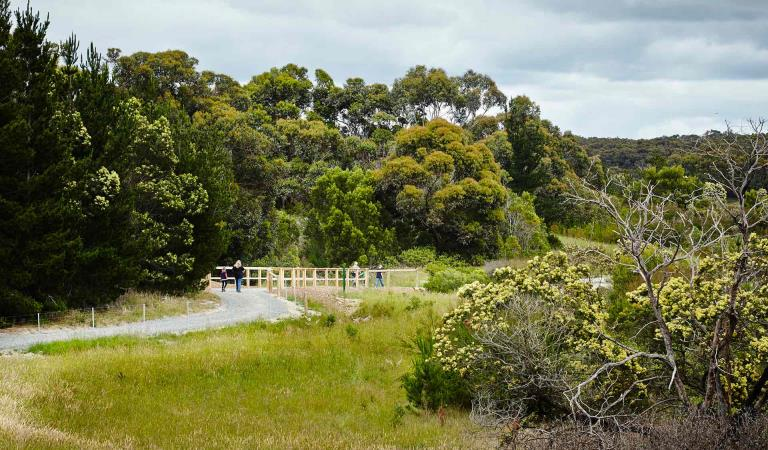
Shoreline Track, part of Devilbend's Reservoir Circuit Trail

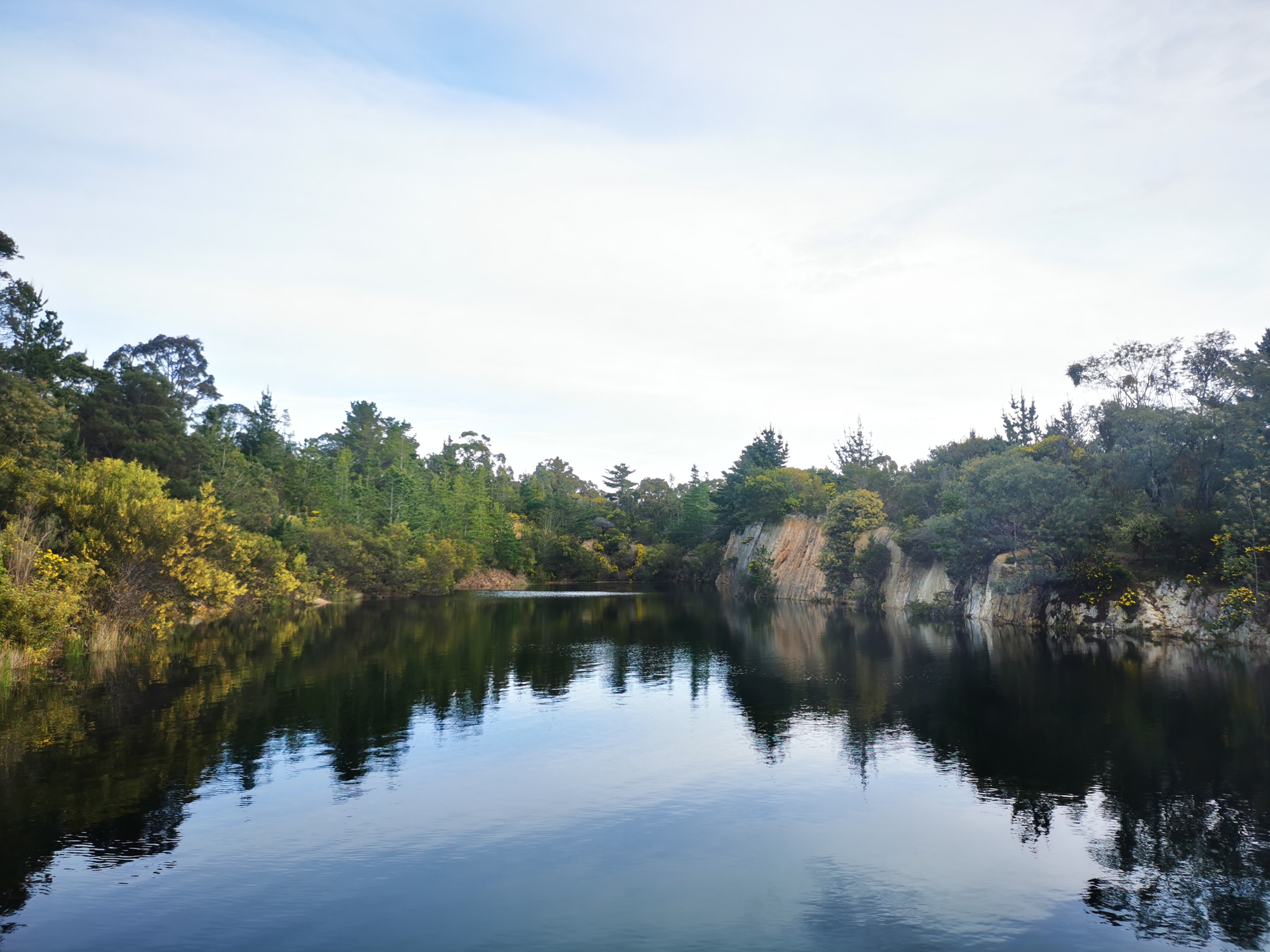
The inlet on the west shore of Daangean Point, part of the boating zone of the Devilbend Reservoir.

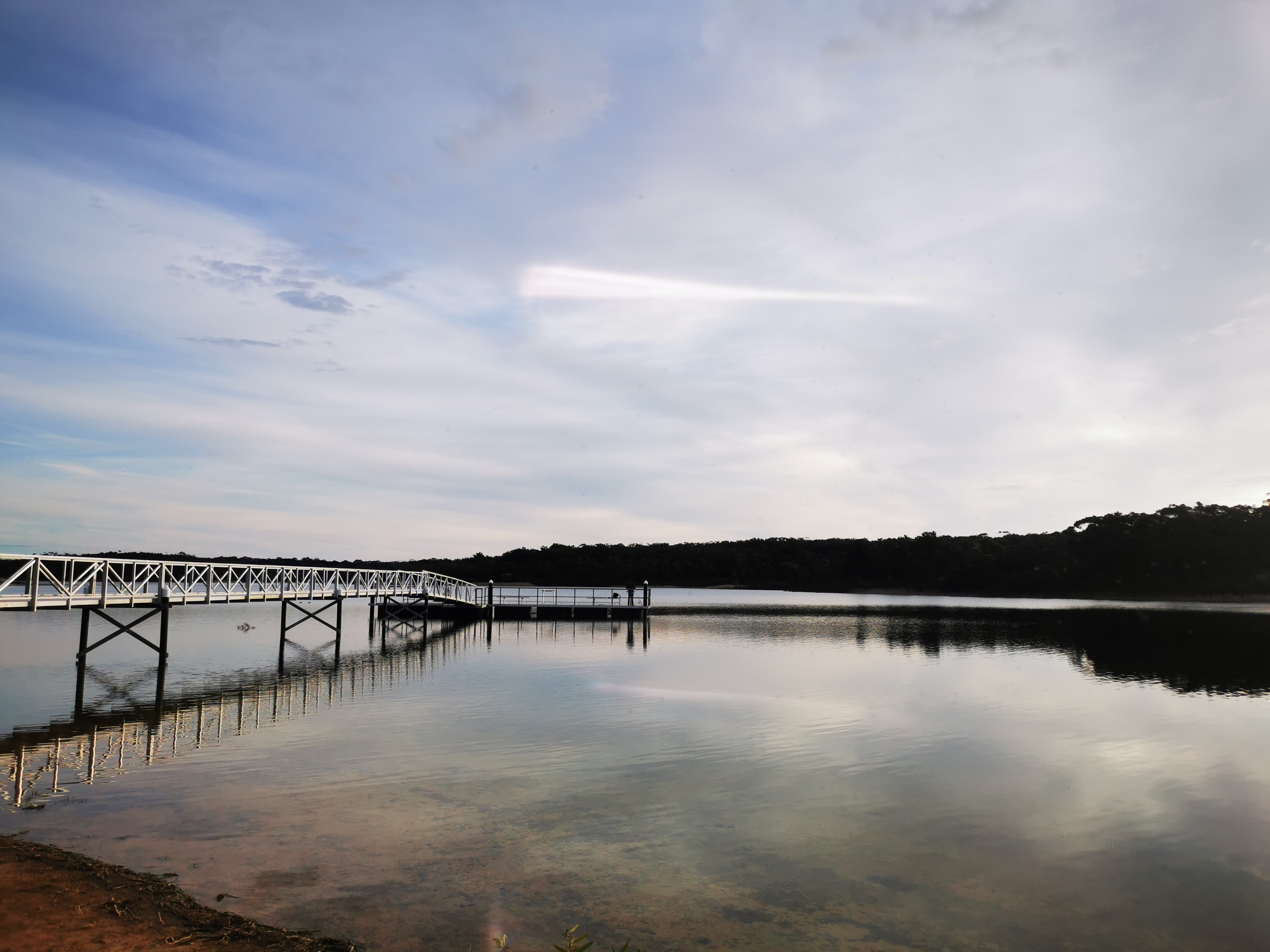
Fishing pier and pontoon on Daangean Point

Picnic tables, shelter, public toilets and electric barbecues are available in the Daangean Point Picnic Area. There is no drinking fountain available.

=== Hiking and cycling ===
The features of Devilbend can be explored by selected walking tracks.

- Western Shoreline Track — 1.2 km (0.75 mi) long, 2.5 m (8 ft 2 in) wide compacted surface shoreline trail, descending from the Devilbend Picnic Area to the fishing platforms and boardwalks.
- Daangean Point Track — 1.5 km (0.93 mi) long bushwalk, running through remnant lowland forest from Daangean Point to the southern shoreline.
- Devilbend Circuit Track — 11.5 km (7.1 mi) long circuit, combining Daangean Trail and the Catch Drain Trail to circumnavigate Devilbend Reservoir and meandering through lowland forest and grassy woodland with multiple access points to the tranquil waterbody providing birdwatching and passive recreation. Bittern Reservoir Circuit is accessible off the southern end at Hodgins Road and can be incorporated into the broader circuit.

The trail system includes all‐ability hiking access to the shoreline, viewing/fishing platforms and boardwalk. Cycling is permitted on all trails in the reserve. Dogs and other pets are not permitted.

=== Horseriding ===
A 6.2 km (3.9 mi) long, 10 m (33 ft) wide horse trail is available for horseriders, accessed off Hodgins, Turners or Derril Roads around the southern boundary.

=== Birdwatching ===
Birdwatching is popular in the Devilbend Natural Features Reserve, which is of high nature conservation significance, and the Devilbend Reservoir is recognised as an Important Bird Area, meaning an area recognised by BirdLife International as being globally important for the conservation of bird populations. The reserve supports over 1% of the global population of blue-billed duck, which is listed as threatened under the Flora and Fauna Guarantee Act 1988, as well as being the only nesting habitat for the majestic white-bellied sea eagle on the Mornington Peninsula. There have been 158 bird species recorded in the area, including 14 international migratory birds.

=== Boating ===
By the end of 2017, Parks Victoria allowed non-powered paddlecrafts (including canoes, kayaks, paddleboards and windsurfers) on the lake, but only on a 33 ha (82 acres) designated boating zone in the northwestern arm of the reservoir, west of a peninsula known as the Daangean Point, with yellow buoys and signs marking the boating zone boundary. Two launch facilities are available by walking along the Western Shoreline Trail, the first of which is approximately 240 m (260 yd) from the picnic ground and car park.

=== Fishing ===
Devilbend and Bittern Reservoirs have game fishes regularly stocked by the Victorian Fisheries Authority, both introduced (such as rainbow trout, brown trout and yellow perch) and native species (such as estuary perch, Australian bass and surf bream), as well as variously naturalized invasive species (such as redfin and carp). Angling is permitted but all adults aged between 18 and 69 require a recreational fishing license and all fishing activities needs to be done in accordance with the Victorian Recreational Fishing Guide. Bank fishing is permitted only in five designated fishing zones in the northern shores of the two reservoirs (four in Devilbend, one in Bittern), and boat fishing only for non‐powered watercraft (human- and wind-powered) in the designated 33-hectare (82-acre) boating zone in the northern arm of the Devilbend Reservoir.

Starting in 2010, the Devilbend Reservoir was stocked with 14,000 rainbow trout and 21,000 brown trout. Those first trout stocks were done secretly, and much of the initial fingerlings were eaten by native perches. In November 2017, the Victorian Fisheries Authority released 180 thumping brown trout (2.5 kg or 5.5 lb each, grown at the Snobs Creek hatchery) into the Reservoir to "improve the mixed fishery". 100,000 trout were stocked in the Devilbend Reservoir between 2010 and 2017.

== See also ==
- Lakes and reservoirs of Melbourne
- Protected areas of Victoria
- Boon wurrung
