= Balnarring Beach =

- Town
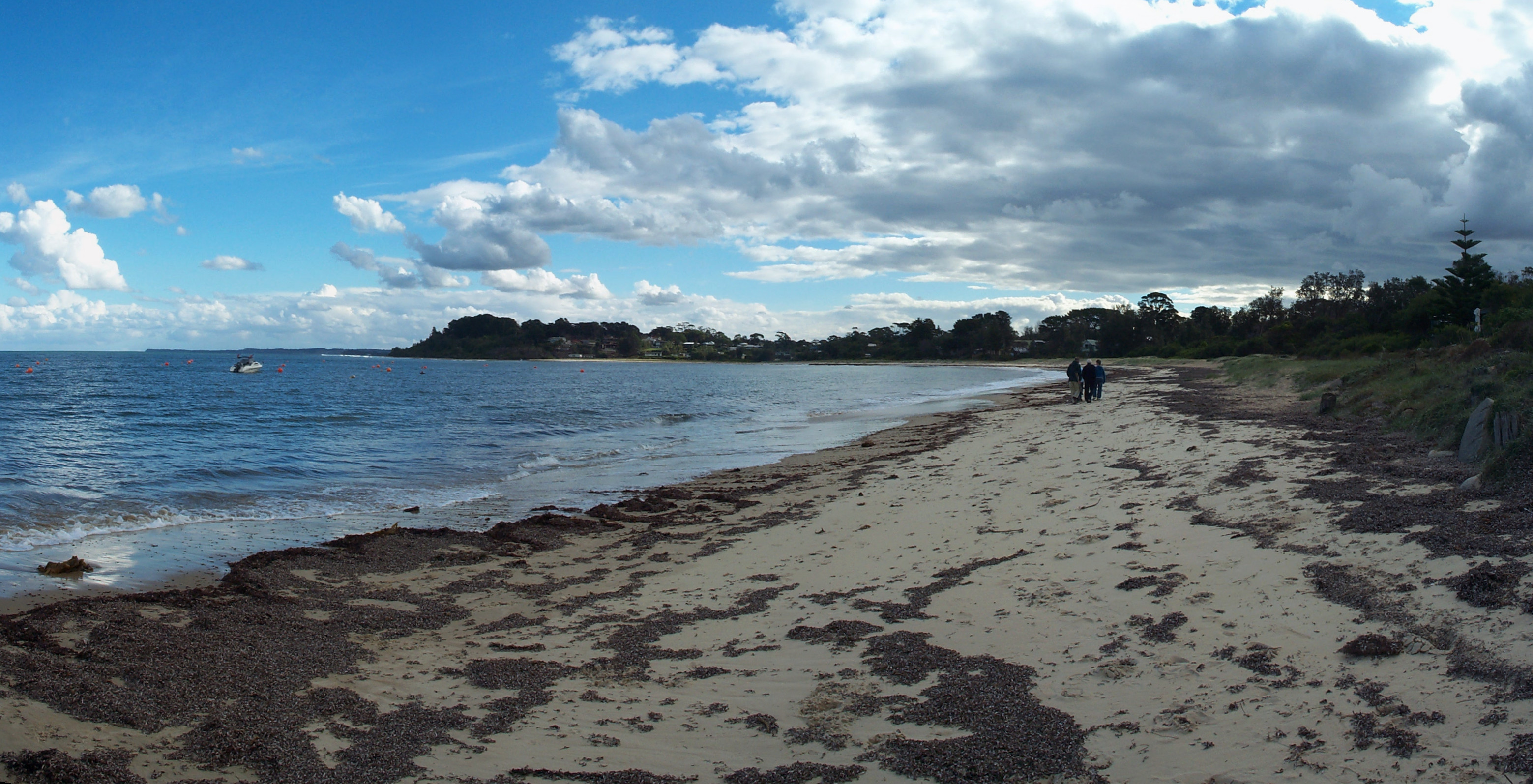
- Balnarring Beach in April 2008

- Interactive map of Balnarring Beach
- Coordinates: 38.359°S 145.136°E
- Country: Australia
- State: Victoria
- LGA: Shire of Mornington Peninsula
- Location: 65 km (40 mi) from Melbourne; 14 km (8.7 mi) from Hastings
- Established: 1910s

Government
  - State electorate: Hastings
  - Federal division: Flinders

Population
  - Total: 471 (2021 census)
- Postcode: 3926
Localities around Balnarring Beach
Balnarring	Balnarring	Balnarring
Balnarring	Balnarring Beach	Somers
Merricks Beach	Western Port	Western Port

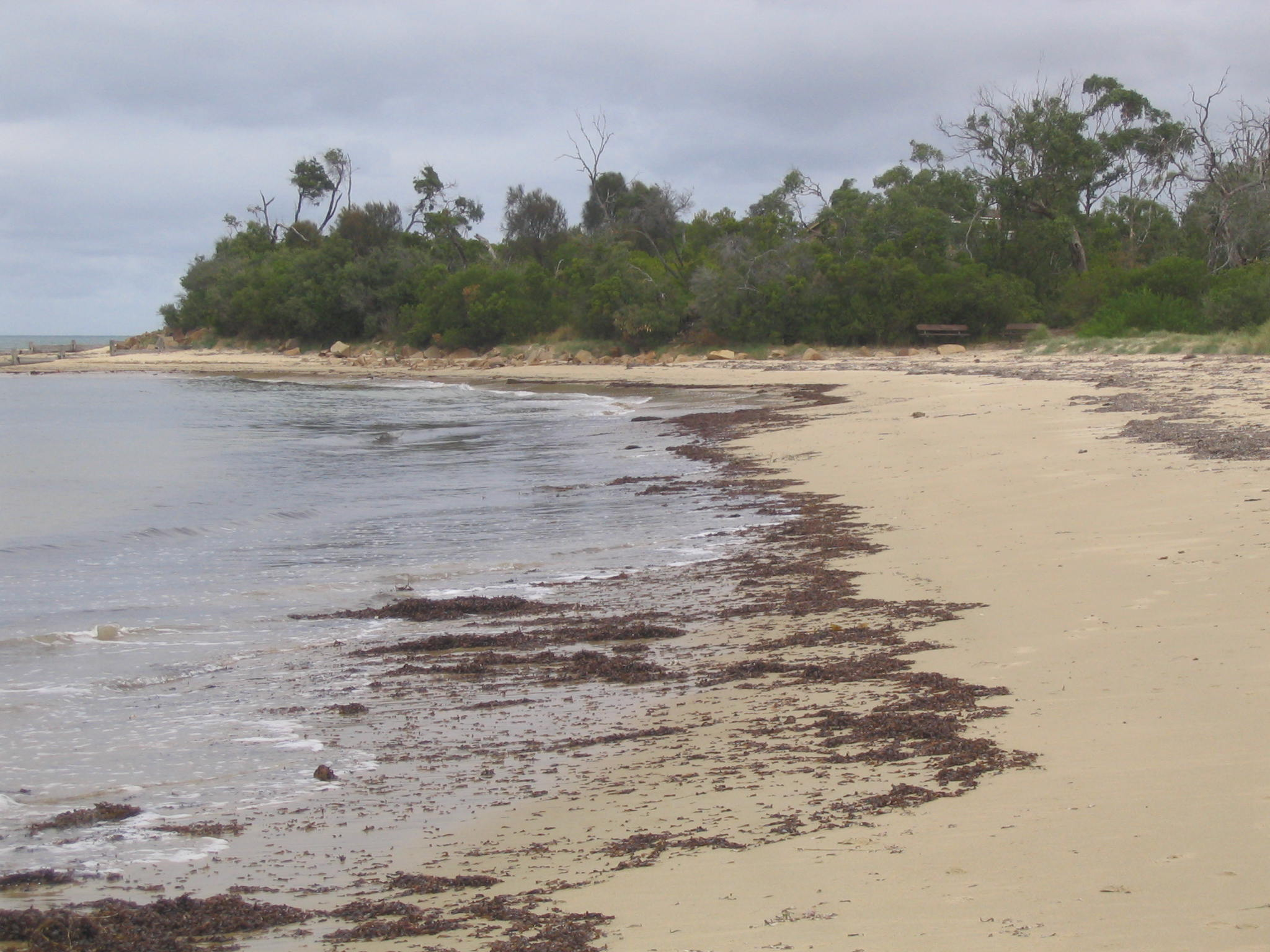
Balnarring Beach

Balnarring Beach is a town on the Mornington Peninsula in Melbourne, Victoria, Australia, 2 km (1.2 mi) south of Balnarring and approximately 65 km (40 mi) south-east of Melbourne's central business district, located within the Shire of Mornington Peninsula local government area. Balnarring Beach recorded a population of 471 at the 2021 census.

In 2006 it was rated by the Keep Australia Beautiful Council as 'Australia's Cleanest Beach', out of 317 beaches in five states.

It was previously known as Tulum Beach.

== History ==
The township was first gazetted in 1886, in a street configuration quite different to what exists today.

The beach first began to attract holidaymakers in the 1910s, and beach stores and kiosks commenced operations, serving both day-trippers and campers. The Harley-Davidson Motorcycle Club set up base here after their formation in 1924. During World War II, businesses were sustained by servicemen training at Somers.

In 1944, a mobile library operated from a private home for the Flinders Shire by Wally Turner. Balnarring Beach Post Office opened on 1 July 1947 and closed in 1978. In 1960 the yacht club was given permission to erect a winch and slipway and build a clubhouse.

== Present day ==
Balnarring Beach (colloquially known as 'The Naz Beach') today consists primarily of holiday homes and camping grounds, and contains a general store, picnic facilities and several caravan parks. Most other services are provided by nearby Balnarring township.

== See also ==
- Shire of Hastings – Balnarring Beach was previously within this former local government area.
