= Red Hill railway line =

Red Hill

Overview
- Status: Dismantled line - Private property, Red Hill Rail Trail
- Owner: Victorian Railways (VR) (1921–1956)
- Locale: Melbourne, Victoria, Australia
- Termini: Bittern; Red Hill
- Continues from: Stony Point line
- Connecting lines: Stony Point line
- Stations: 1 current station; 3 former stations

Service
- Type: Former Melbourne suburban service
- Operator(s): Victorian Railways (VR) (1921–1956)

History
- Opened: 2 December 1921
- Last train: 25 February 1956
- Closed: 1 July 1953

Technical
- Line length: 16.135 km (10.026 mi)
- Number of tracks: Single track
- Track gauge: 1,600 mm (5 ft 3 in)
- Maximum incline: 1 in 30 (3.33%)

The Red Hill railway line in Melbourne, Australia, was a rural railway branching off from the Stony Point railway line at Bittern. The line had a fairly short life, opening on 2 December 1921 and closing on 1 July 1953.

== Current status ==
The line was dismantled some time after it was closed, and most of the line from Bittern to Merricks is now on private property, while the right-of-way from Merricks to Red Hill remains, having been converted to a shared use rail trail.

== Station histories ==
| Station | Opened | Closed | Age |
|---|---|---|---|
| Bittern | 17 December 1889 || || data-sort-value=49,404 | 135 years | | |
| Balnarring | 2 December 1921 || 1 July 1953 || data-sort-value=11,534 | 31 years | | |
| Merricks | 2 December 1921 || 1 July 1953 || data-sort-value=11,534 | 31 years | | |
| Red Hill | 2 December 1921 || 1 July 1953 || data-sort-value=11,534 | 31 years | | |
