= Merricks Beach =

Merricks Beach Victoria
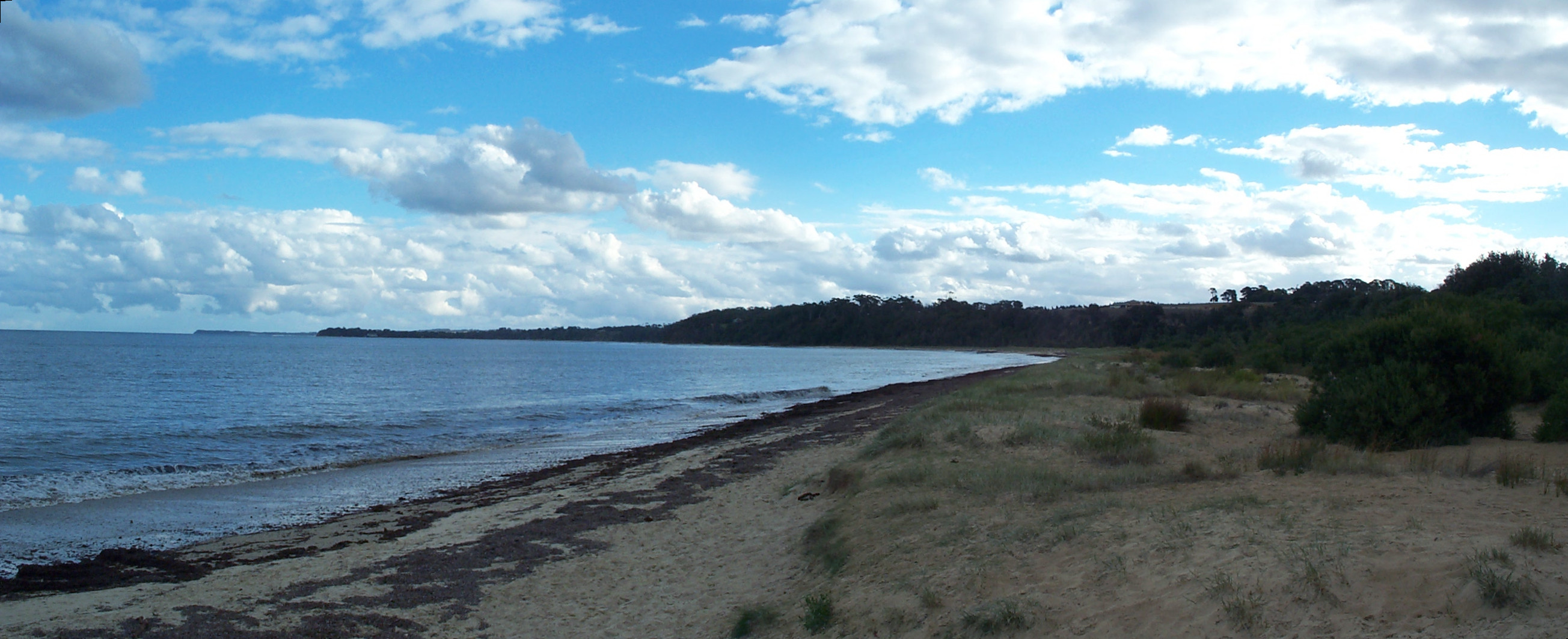
- Merricks Beach in April

- Coordinates: 38.398°S 145.106°E
- Population: 157 (2021 census)
- Established: 1910s
- Postcode(s): 3926
- Location: 73 km (45 mi) from Melbourne; 16 km (10 mi) from Hastings
- LGA(s): Shire of Mornington Peninsula
- State electorate(s): Hastings
- Federal division(s): Flinders
Localities around Merricks Beach:
Merricks	Balnarring	Balnarring
Merricks	Merricks Beach	Balnarring Beach
Merricks	Western Port	Western Port

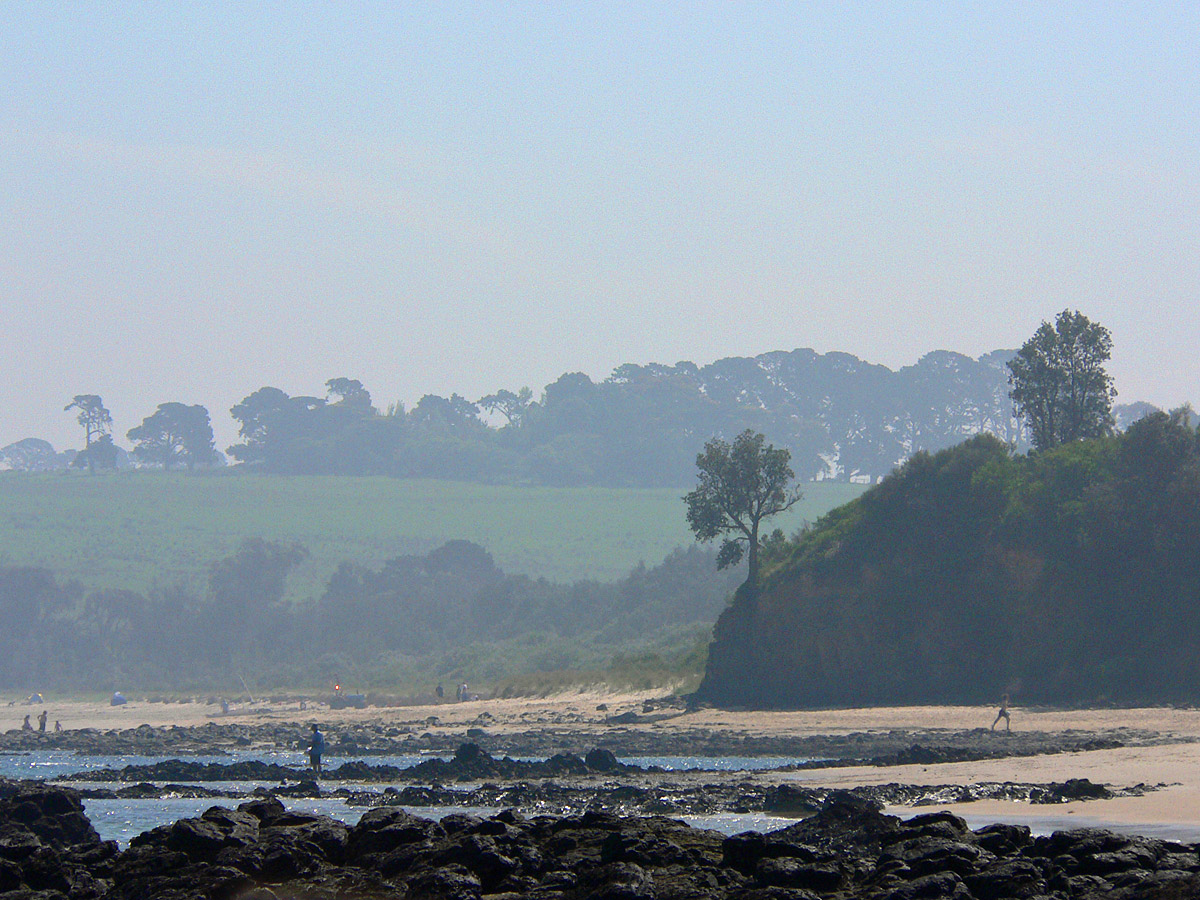
Merricks Beach

Merricks Beach is a town on the Mornington Peninsula in Melbourne Victoria, Australia, approximately 66 km (41 mi) south-east of Melbourne's Central Business District, located within the Shire of Mornington Peninsula local government area. Merricks Beach recorded a population of 157 at the 2021 census.

Merricks Beach is located on the eastern side of the peninsula on Western Port Bay.

== See also ==
- Shire of Hastings – Merricks Beach was previously within this former local government area.
