= Merricks railway station =

Former railway station in Victoria, Australia

Coordinates: 38°23′20″S 145°5′19″E

Merricks

General information
- Line: Red Hill line
- Platforms: 1
- Tracks: 1

Other information
- Status: Closed

History
- Opened: 2 December 1921
- Closed: 29 June 1952

Services
Preceding station	Disused railways	Following station
Balnarring	Red Hill line	Red Hill
	List of closed railway stations in Melbourne	
Location

Merricks railway station was located on the Red Hill railway line. The line was opened in 1921 and was one of the more short lived branch lines on the Victorian Railways closing in 1952 with many other smaller branch lines in the railways system. The Merricks station grounds are now part of an equestrian facility. Part of the railway alignment between Red Hill and Merricks stations has also been converted into an equestrian and walking trail with the remaining majority of the line now located on private properties.
