= Balnarring railway station =

Former railway station in Victoria, Australia

Coordinates: 38°22′22″S 145°7′45″E

Balnarring

General information
- Line: Red Hill line
- Platforms: 1
- Tracks: 1

Other information
- Status: Closed

History
- Opened: 2 December 1921
- Closed: 29 June 1953

Services
Preceding station	Disused railways	Following station
Bittern	Red Hill line	Merricks
	List of closed railway stations in Melbourne	
Location

Balnarring railway station was located on the Red Hill railway line. The line was opened in 1921 and was one of the more short-lived branch lines on the Victorian Railways closing in 1953 along with a few other smaller branch lines in the railways system. Following official closure of the line, trains (railmotors) continued to run as far as Balnarring to cater for the Balnarring picnic races, Lord Somers camp and a Railway Historical Society tour in 1956. Part of the railway alignment between Red Hill and Merricks stations has been converted into an equestrian trail with the remaining majority of the line now located on private properties. The station is located in private property with almost no remains of the platform left.
