= Merricks North =

- Town
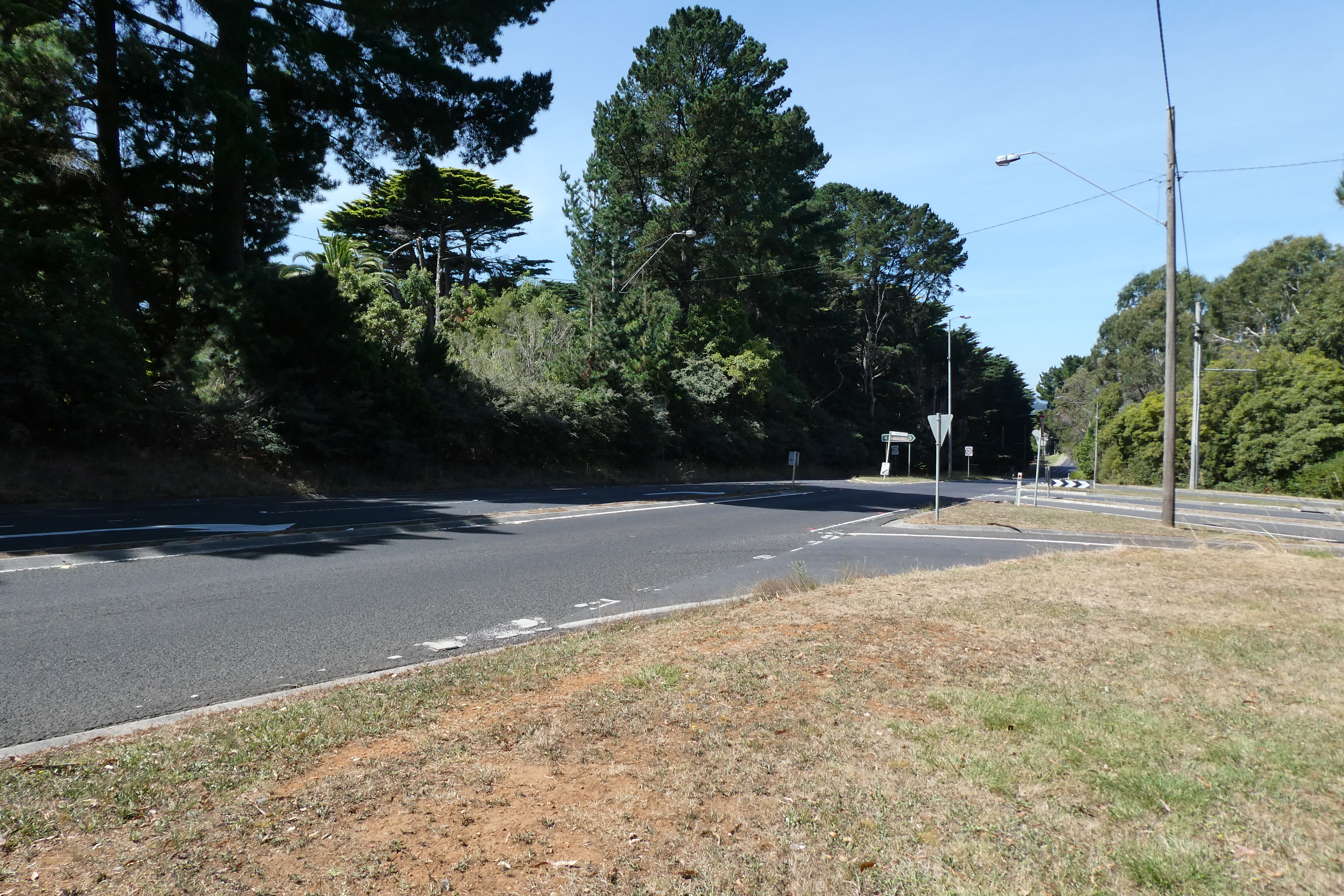
- Bittern-Dromana Road and Merricks Road

- Interactive map of Merricks North
- Coordinates: 38.354°S 145.075°E
- Country: Australia
- State: Victoria
- LGA: Shire of Mornington Peninsula
- Location: 91 km (57 mi) from Melbourne; 12 km (7.5 mi) from Hastings

Government
  - State electorate: Nepean
  - Federal division: Flinders

Population
  - Total: 423 (2021 census)
- Postcode: 3926
Localities around Merricks North
Mount Martha	Mount Martha	Hastings
Dromana	Merricks North	Balnarring
Red Hill	Red Hill South	Balnarring

Merricks North is a locality on the Mornington Peninsula in Melbourne, Victoria, Australia, approximately 60 km (37 mi) south-east of Melbourne's Central Business District, located within the Shire of Mornington Peninsula local government area. Merricks North recorded a population of 423 at the 2021 census.

Merricks North is located in the southern extremity of the Mornington Peninsula.

== See also ==
- Shire of Hastings – Merricks North was previously within this former local government area.
