= Balnarring =

- Town
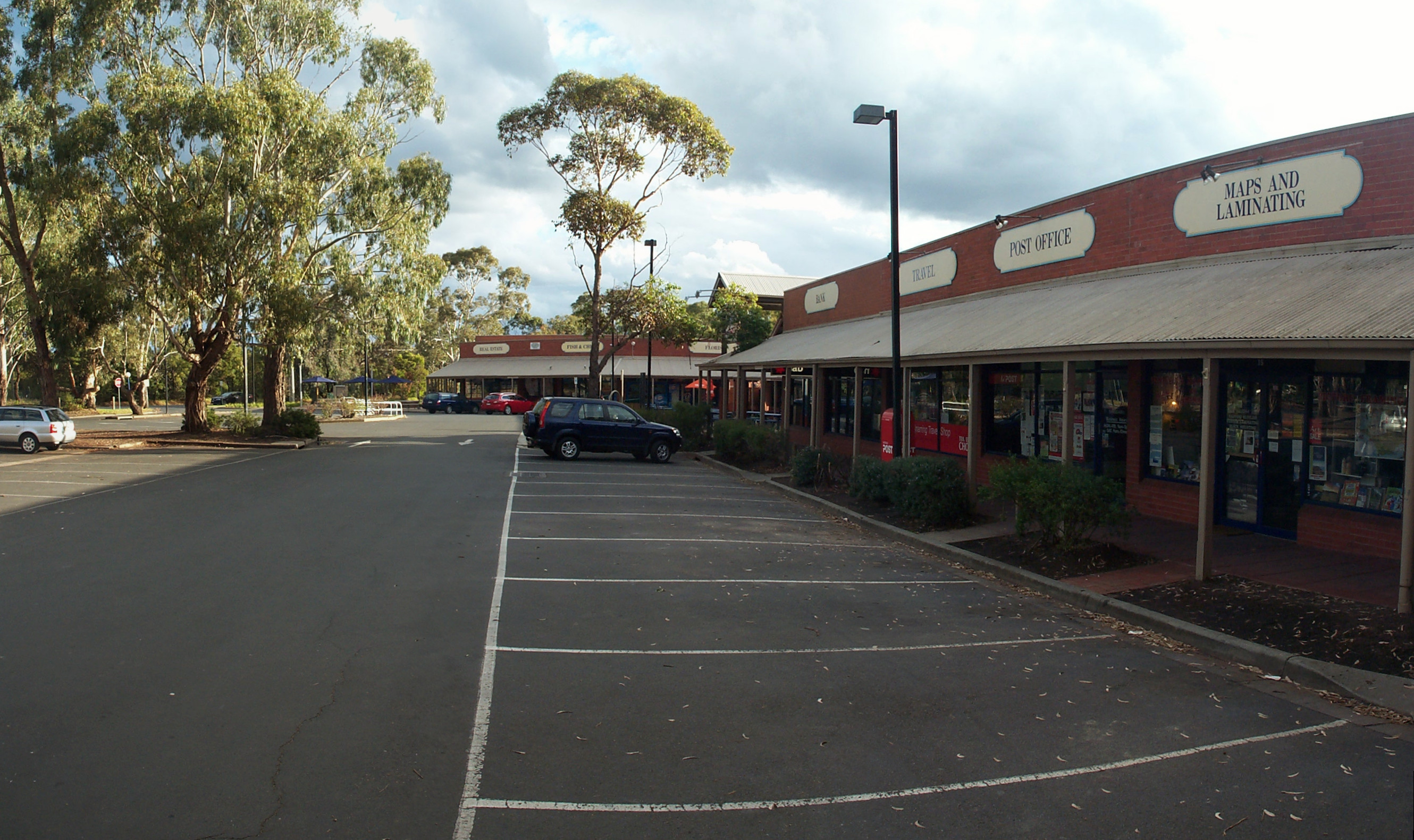
- Balnarring village shopping centre

- Interactive map of Balnarring
- Coordinates: 38.371°S 145.118°E
- Country: Australia
- State: Victoria
- LGA: Shire of Mornington Peninsula
- Location: 72 km (45 mi) from Melbourne; 12 km (7.5 mi) from Hastings
- Established: 1860s

Government
  - State electorates: Nepean; Hastings
  - Federal division: Flinders

Population
  - Total: 2,371 (2021 census)
- Postcode: 3926
Localities around Balnarring
Merricks North	Hastings	Bittern
Merricks North	Balnarring	Bittern
Point Leo	Merricks Beach	Balnarring Beach

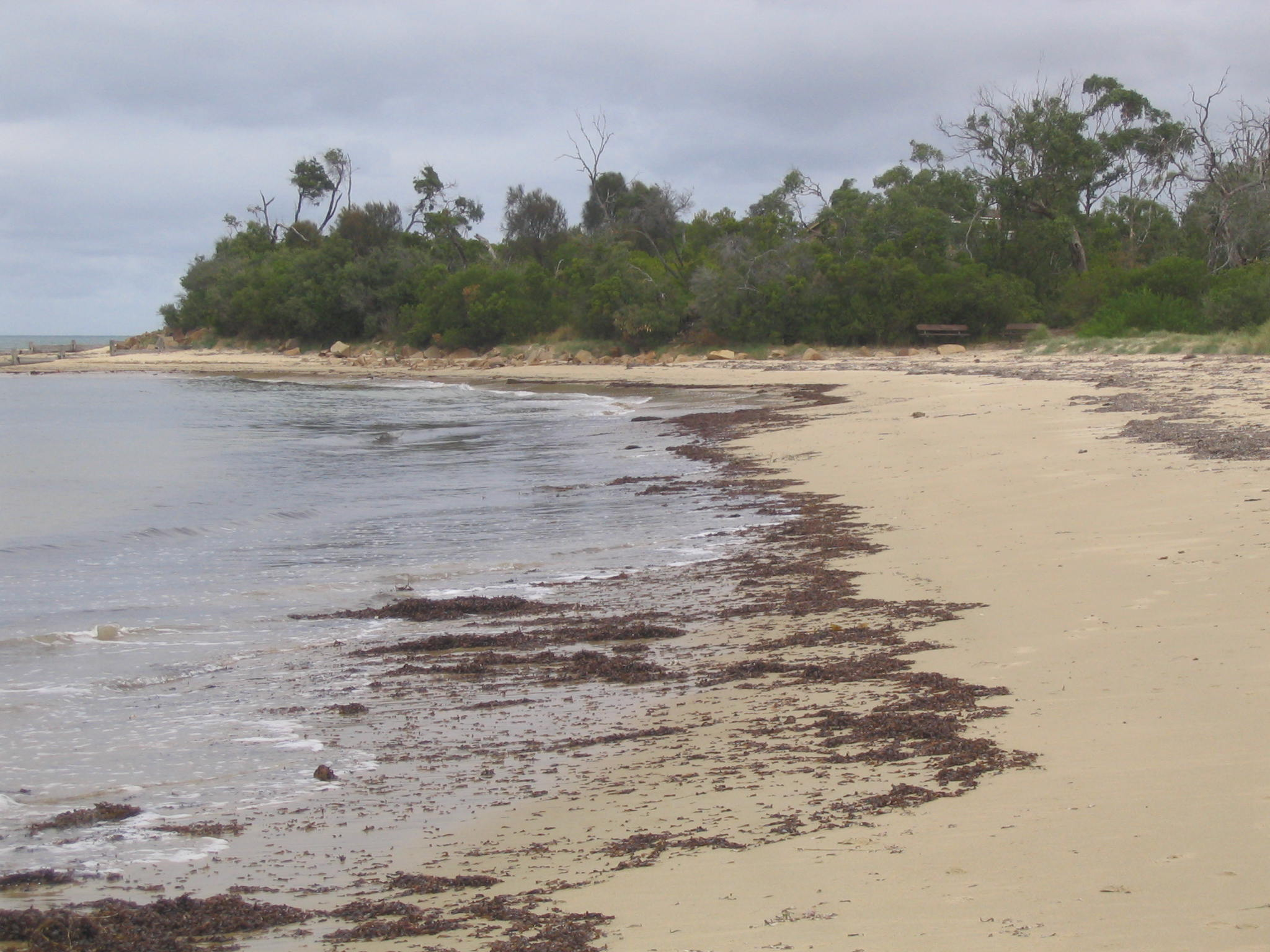
Balnarring Beach

Balnarring is a town in the south-eastern extremity of the Mornington Peninsula in Melbourne, Victoria, Australia, approximately 63 km (39 mi) south-east of Melbourne's central business district, located within the Shire of Mornington Peninsula local government area. Balnarring recorded a population of 2,371 at the 2021 census.

Balnarring is located about halfway between Hastings and Flinders.

== History ==
Early reports of the area suggested the region was "thick with honeysuckle and sheoak", and that the area from Somers to Point Leo contained "good soil, good grass, and open forest timbered with Gums wattle and She Oak trees". Early settlers were involved in wattle bark stripping and cutting piles and sleepers for shipping to Melbourne via Shoreham to the southwest.

From 1857 onwards, the Government enacted a series of Land Acts designed to open the land, dividing it into small blocks and hoping to create a living for small-scale farmers. The Parish of Balnarring was surveyed in 1865, as part of the "Agricultural Area of Mount McMahon". Most of the selectors were orchardists although dairymen also took an interest in the area. In the 1920s, the construction of cool stores at Red Hill increased their ability to trade their produce with the outside world.

In 1866, a post office opened, and a school shortly afterwards, and in 1869, an inn and store called the Tower Hotel operated by the Van Suylens on their property, "Warrawee", was established to serve local residents on the Frankston-Flinders road. This and the Sandy Point Road had already been established as tracks, as indicated on an 1874 map of the area. An 1891 map shows a blacksmith's store where the panel beaters operation presently stands at this intersection.

A writer in 1902 described Balnarring as a "little wayside hamlet on the road between Hastings and Flinders....probably one of the least pretentious in the state. It consists chiefly of a state school, but there are a few buildings within sight of the main road". In 1962, the Victorian Municipal Directory stated Balnarring had a "post and telegraph office, two churches, mechanics' institute and library".

The railway station in Balnarring opened on 2 December 1921 but, like its Red Hill branch line, was relatively short-lived, officially closing on 29 June 1953. However, it was kept in service for annual local events until about 10 years after the closure.

On 23 August 1899, the Balnarring Mechanics' Institute was opened by the Hon. F.S. Grimwade (MLC North Yarra, 1891–1904). It was a timber hall, used as a community hall and social centre by the community until the 1960s. A new hall was built in 1969. In 1970 the Mechanics' Institute building burned down, and in 1979 a reserve was declared in its original location.

== Present day ==
Balnarring is at the crossroads of two primary main roads in the south-eastern region of the Mornington Peninsula, namely Frankston-Flinders Road and Balnarring Road (from Mornington), and as a result is home to a few motels, a post office and several shops and cafes. It also has a primary school, Balnarring Primary School.

Balnarring has a picnic horse racing club, the Balnarring Picnic Racing Club (established in 1863), which schedules around six race meetings a year including the Balnarring Cup meeting on Australia Day (26 January) at the Emu Plains racecourse and recreation reserve.

The Emu Plains Market which operates monthly in summer at the same location is very popular with locals and tourists.

Balnarring is served by the 782 bus route operated by Ventura Bus Lines between Frankston and Flinders.

== See also ==
- Shire of Hastings – Balnarring was previously within this former local government area.
