= Red Hill Rail Trail =

Rail trail in Victoria, Australia

Coordinates: 38°22′54″S 145°3′30″E

Red Hill Rail Trail is a 6.5 kilometre rail trail connecting Red Hill with Merricks, on the Mornington Peninsula, Victoria, Australia. It is primarily used by horse riders. It has gravel, dirt and grass surfaces.

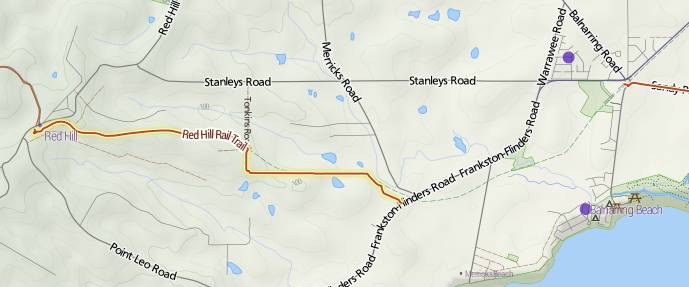
Map of the rail trail.
