= Shire of Mornington Peninsula =

Coordinates: 38°26′S 145°00′E

Mornington Peninsula Shire
- Local government area
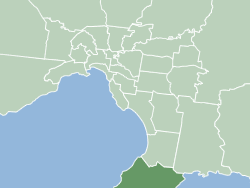

- Interactive map of Mornington Peninsula Shire
- Country: Australia
- State: Victoria
- Region: Greater Melbourne
- Established: 1994
- Council seat: Rosebud

Government
  - Mayor: Cr Anthony Marsh
  - State electorates: Hastings; Mornington; Nepean
  - Federal divisions: Dunkley; Flinders

Area
  - Total: 724 km^{2} (280 sq mi)

Population
  - Total: 168,948 (2021) (40th)
  - Density: 233.35/km^{2} (604.4/sq mi)
- Website: Mornington Peninsula Shire
LGAs around Mornington Peninsula Shire
Port Phillip	Frankston	Casey
Port Phillip	Mornington Peninsula Shire	Western Port
Bass Strait	Bass Strait	Bass Strait

The Mornington Peninsula Shire is a local government area in southeastern metropolitan Melbourne, Victoria, Australia. Located to the south of the Melbourne city centre, it covers its namesake Mornington Peninsula, and is headquartered in the suburb of Rosebud. It has an area of 724 square kilometres (280 sq mi) and at the 2021 census it had a population of 168,948.

== History ==
The Mornington Peninsula Shire came into existence on 15 December 1994 when the state government amalgamated the previous Shires of Flinders, Hastings and Mornington.

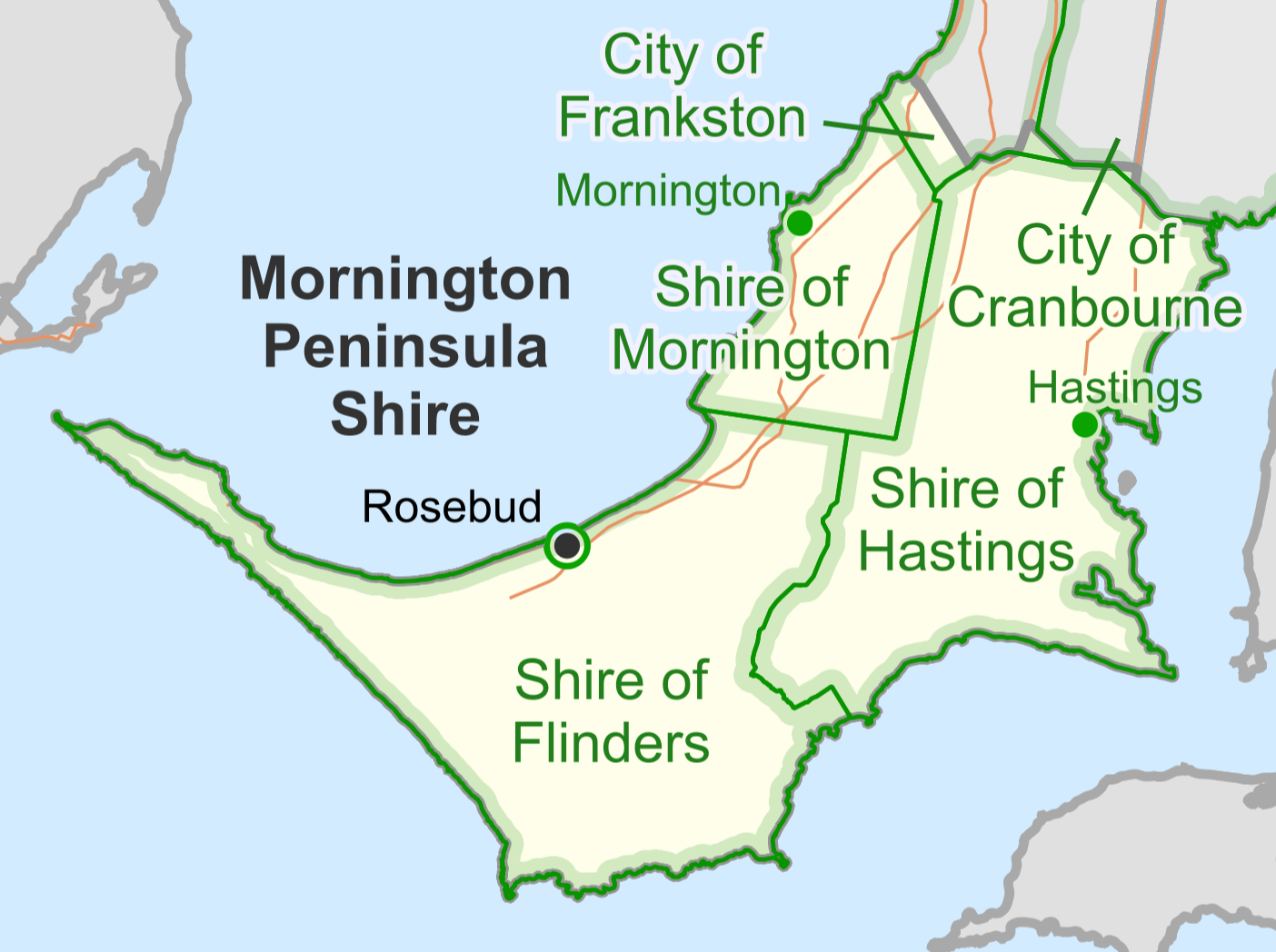
Mornington Peninsula Shire's predecessor LGAs (green) as they were in 1994. The administrative centres of the former LGAs are marked by green dots.

On August 13, 2019, the Shire voted to declare a climate emergency in response to other similar declarations from councils around Australia. This declaration was later overturned by a motion in April 2025, which passed with a 6–5 vote.

The Shire abolished the 150-year-old tradition of reciting a prayer before Council meetings in December 2020. According to the Australian National Secular Lobby, the Shire was "the first council or parliament to be removed from their list of government institutions that impose prayers on elected representatives”.

== Council ==
=== Current composition ===
2024 ward boundaries. Expand the map and click on a ward to see the ward name.

The Mornington Peninsula Shire is split into eleven single-member wards. The current council was elected at the 2024 council election:

Ward	Party	Councillor	Notes
Beek Beek	Independent	Kate Roper	
Benbenjie	Independent	Max Patton	
Briars		Vacant	
Brokil	Independent	Patrick Binyon	
Coolart	Independent	David Gill	
Kackeraboite	Independent Liberal	Stephen Batty	Mayor
Moorooduc	Independent	Bruce Ranken	
Nepean	Independent	Andrea Allen	
Tanti	Independent	Paul Pingiaro	Deputy Mayor
Tootgarook	Independent	Cam Williams	
Warringine	Independent	Michael Stephens	

== Election results ==
=== 2024 ===
2024 Victorian local elections: Mornington Peninsula
Party	Votes	%	Swing	Seats	Change
Independent	90,460	82.86		10	▼1
Independent Liberal	10,013	9.17		1	▲1
Independent Labor	5,864	5.37		0	Steady
Greens	2,026	1.86		0	Steady
Victorian Socialists	811	0.74		0	Steady
Formal votes	109,174	97.01			
Informal votes	3,360	2.99			
Total	112,534	100.00		11	Steady
Registered voters / turnout	134,819	83.47			

== Townships and localities ==
The 2021 census, the shire had a population of 168,948 up from 154,999 in the 2016 census

Population
Locality	2016	2021
Arthurs Seat	394	414
Balnarring	2,270	2,371
Balnarring Beach	418	471
Baxter	2,162	2,166
Bittern	3,705	4,276
Blairgowrie	2,313	2,786
Boneo	354	314
Cape Schanck	446	569
Capel Sound	4,930	5,246
Crib Point	3,183	3,343
Dromana	5,803	6,626
Fingal	529	637
Flinders	905	1,130
Hastings	9,609	10,369
HMAS Cerberus	1,040	1,124
Main Ridge	416	453
McCrae	2,823	3,311
Merricks	190	184
Merricks Beach	127	157
Merricks North	426	423
Moorooduc	1,098	1,004
Mornington	23,989	25,759
Mount Eliza	17,888	18,734
Mount Martha	18,548	19,846
Pearcedale^	3,821	3,867
Point Leo	158	178
Portsea	510	787
Red Hill	924	1,009
Red Hill South	603	708
Rosebud	13,195	14,381
Rye	8,416	9,438
Safety Beach	4,821	6,328
Shoreham	608	679
Somers	1,667	1,857
Somerville	11,336	11,767
Sorrento	1,592	2,013
St Andrews Beach	889	974
Tootgarook	2,869	3,178
Tuerong	354	357
Tyabb	3,338	3,449

^ - Territory divided with another LGA

== See also ==
- List of Melbourne suburbs, for other Melbourne suburbs and municipalities
- Mornington Peninsula and Western Port Biosphere Reserve
