= Ten Minutes by Tractor =

Australian restaurant and winery

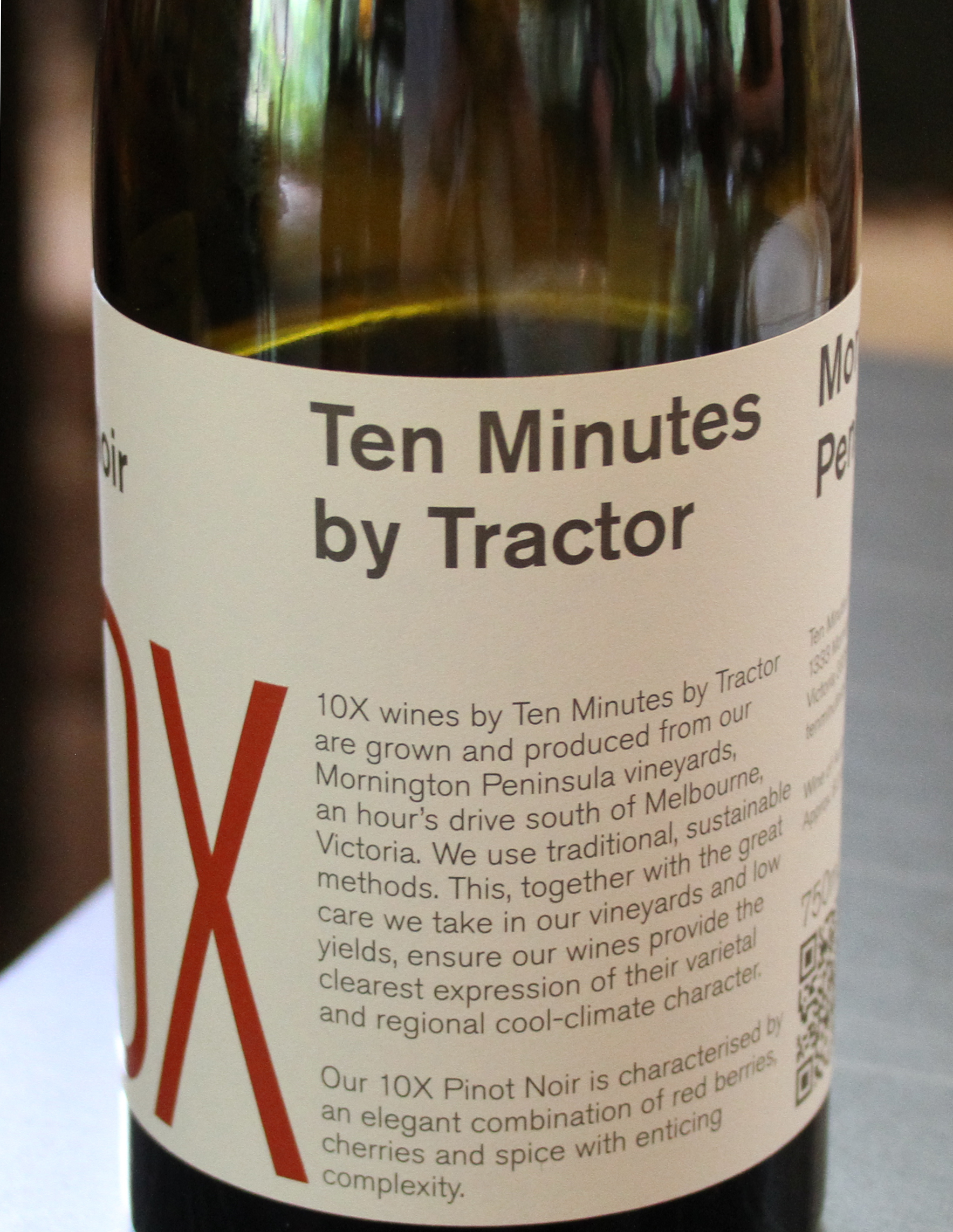
- Bottle of pinot noir
- Interactive map of Ten Minutes by Tractor

Restaurant information
- Head chef: Hayden Ellis
- Location: 1333 Mornington Flinders Road, Main Ridge, Victoria 3928, Australia

Ten Minutes by Tractor is an Australian restaurant and winery in Main Ridge on the Mornington Peninsula in Victoria.

== Description ==
The dining room is described as "beautifully light-filled" with "vines and gum leaves framed like landscape paintings by large windows". It has dark timber floors, linen-clothed tables, and moss-bench seats. Lorikeets can be seen outside the venue's windows.

Dishes are set, with five courses plus a small number of appetisers. Dishes mentioned by Ben Groundwater in his Sydney Morning Herald review included salmon roe, bone marrow, salted butter, crisp-skinned duck breast, and lamingtons for desert. Other dishes highlighted by reviewers include the fatty pork loin, crispy pig skin and trotter crumble, and the snapper tart.

Wines include both the winery's own produce, as well as others from around Australia.

== History ==
The restaurant was built nearby three vineyards planted in 1999. The vineyards are 10 minutes tractor ride apart, from which the venue derives its name.

In February 2018, a fire destroyed the tasting room, restaurant, and 16,000 bottles of wine in the cellar. It was later rebuilt.

The head chef is Hayden Ellis, who formerly worked at Vue de Monde in Melbourne, Australia and The Fat Duck in Berkshire, England. The previous chef was Adam Sanderson.

== Reception ==
In her review for the Herald Sun, food writer Kara Monssen wrote: "A celebration of provenance, produce and homegrown pleasures, I have no doubt Ten Minutes by Tractor will remain a jewel in the Peninsula's crown for many years to come", giving it a rating of 16.5/20.
