= Point Leo =

- Town
- Interactive map of Point Leo
- Coordinates: 38.421°S 145.075°E
- Country: Australia
- State: Victoria
- LGA: Shire of Mornington Peninsula
- Location: 96.5 km (60.0 mi) from Melbourne; 20 km (12 mi) from Rosebud
- Established: 1934

Government
  - State electorate: Nepean
  - Federal division: Flinders

Population
  - Total: 178 (2021 census)
- Postcode: 3916
Localities around Point Leo
Red Hill	Red Hill South	Balnarring
Red Hill	Point Leo	Merricks Beach
Shoreham	Shoreham	Western Port

Point Leo is a town on the shore of Western Port bay on the eastern side of the Mornington Peninsula in Melbourne, Victoria, Australia, 67 km (42 mi) south-east of Melbourne's Central Business District, located within the Shire of Mornington Peninsula local government area. Point Leo recorded a population of 178 at the 2021 census.

Point Leo Foreshore Reserve provides excellent waves for surfing and is one of the closest surf beaches to Melbourne.

== History ==
The area was known as Bobbanaring to the local Bunurong people prior to European settlement. The area was first surveyed in 1841, and a town was proposed here in 1869. A subdivision plan was lodged in 1934 but the area did not develop until after World War II, when the Woods family built a house and store. Facilities were developed in the 1960s, including camping grounds, toilet blocks with hot showers on the foreshore and a kiosk on the surf beach. A Post Office opened on 8 December 1969, but closed in 1974. By the 1980s the area was still dominated by holiday homes and weekend travellers with few permanent residents.

== Present day ==
The small town contains a general store and supports an active surf lifesaving club and boat club. A large foreshore reserve includes picnic, barbecue and camping areas, managed by Point Leo Foreshore, and provide access to the surf beach. A gate fee is payable. Most other facilities are available from nearby Shoreham and Balnarring.

No public transport services Point Leo directly although the bus route 782 operated by Ventura Bus Lines between Frankston and Flinders passes within 2 km of the town.

== See also ==
- Shire of Hastings – Point Leo was previously within this former local government area.
