= Arthurs Seat, Victoria =

Arthurs Seat
- Town
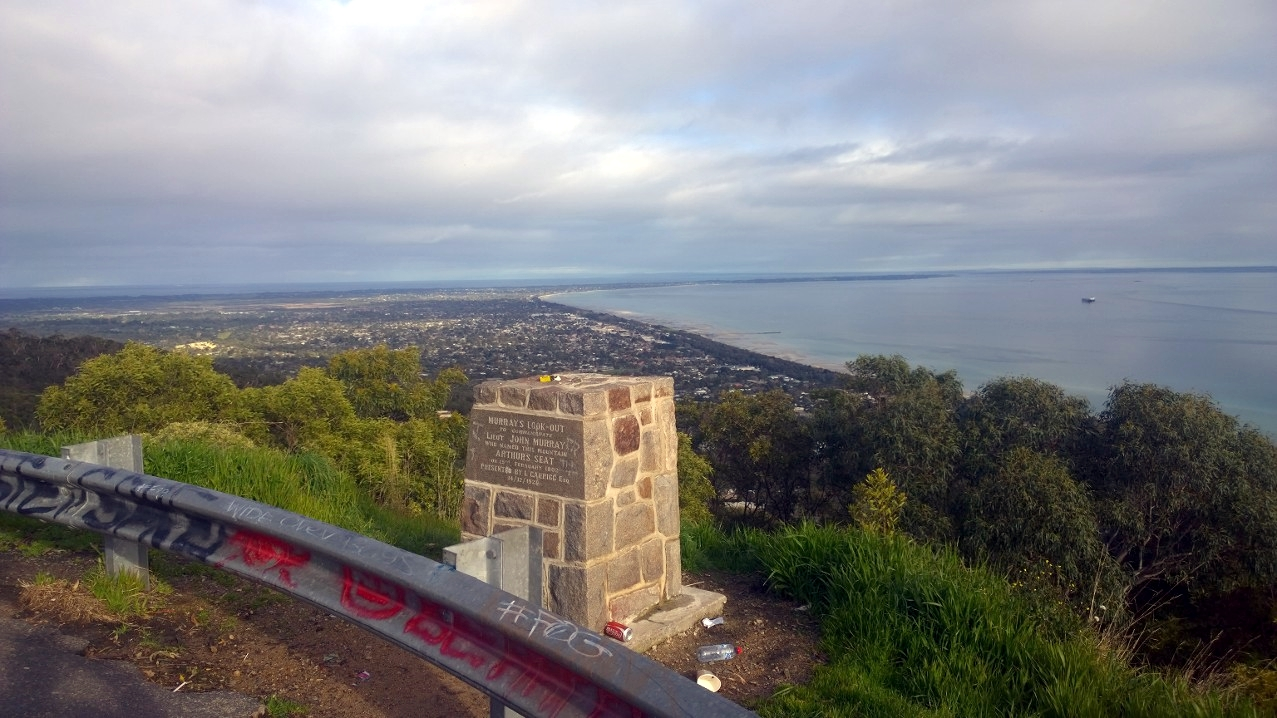
- View from Arthurs Seat towards Port Phillip heads

- Interactive map of Arthurs Seat
- Coordinates: 38°21′7.2″S 144°57′10.8″E
- Country: Australia
- State: Victoria
- LGA: Shire of Mornington Peninsula
- Location: 85 km (53 mi) from Melbourne

Government
  - State electorate: Nepean
  - Federal division: Flinders

Area
  - Total: 1.5 km^{2} (0.58 sq mi)

Population
  - Total: 414 (2021 census)
  - Density: 276/km^{2} (715/sq mi)
- Time zone: UTC+10 (AEST)
  - Summer (DST): UTC+11 (AEDT)
- Postcode: 3936
Localities around Arthurs Seat
Port Phillip	Dromana	Dromana
McCrae	Arthurs Seat	Dromana
Rosebud	Main Ridge	Red Hill

Arthurs Seat is a mountainous and small locality on the Mornington Peninsula in Melbourne, Victoria, Australia, about 85 km south east of Melbourne's Central Business District, located within the Shire of Mornington Peninsula local government area. Arthurs Seat recorded a population of 414 at the 2021 census.

Arthurs Seat is noted for its exclusivity and the general affluence of the demographics which make up the enclave. The Aboriginal Boonwurrung name for the hill is Wonga.

It is a major tourist destination, with stately homes, and due to its natural bushland, sweeping views and man-made attractions. The hill rises to 314 m (1,030 ft) above sea level.

The underlying rocks are Devonian granite, bounded to the west by the Selwyn Fault. The vegetation consists of dry open forest of mixed eucalypt species, which was extensively burnt during a bushfire in 1973 and again in 1997. The indigenous vegetation on the north-west face has been heavily infested with noxious weed and much of the natural vegetation has been cleared away, although several large stands still remain.

== History ==
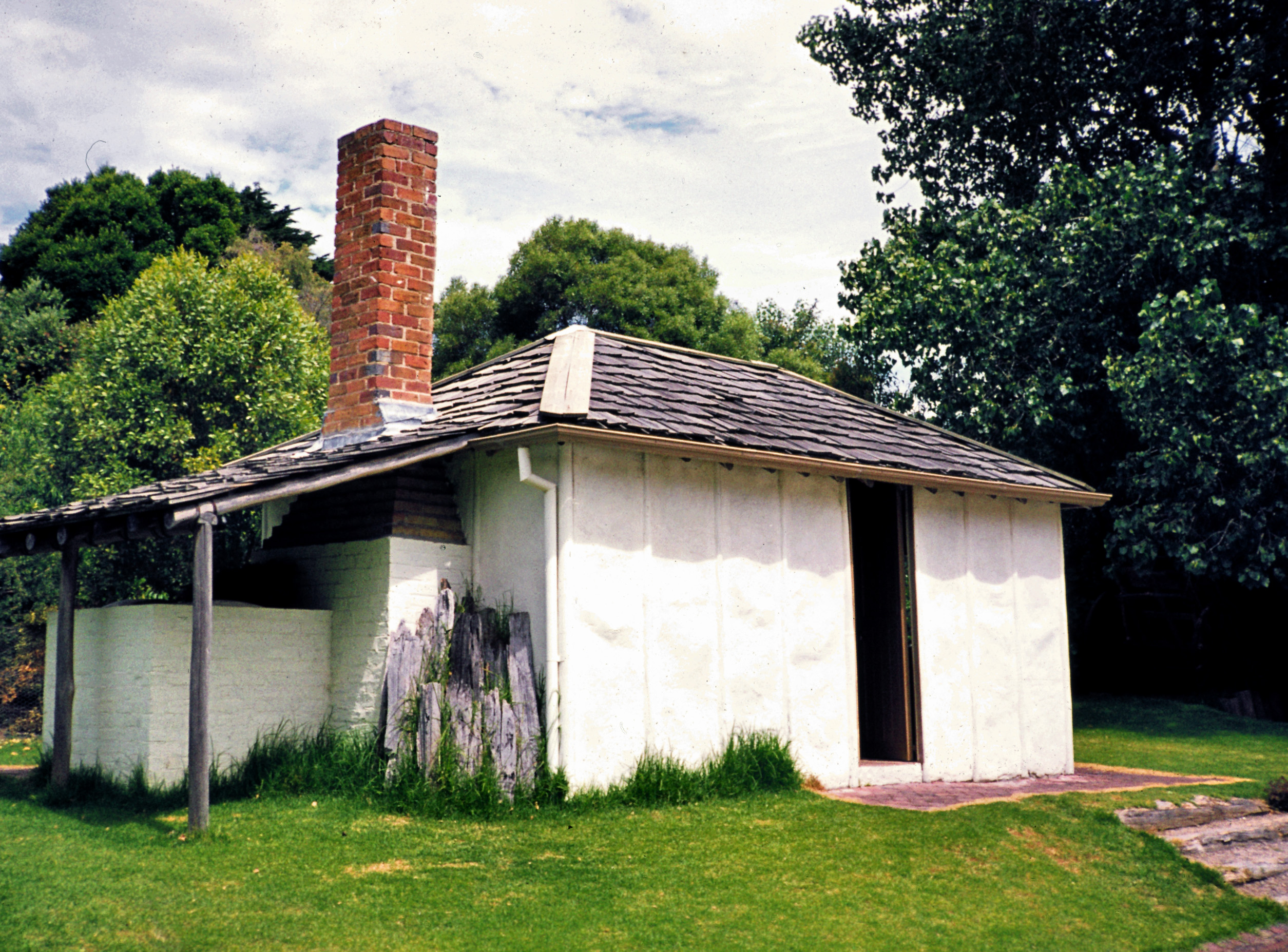
McCrae Homestead, a heritage-listed cottage on the pastoral run of Arthur's Seat, built in c. 1844

Wonga was home to the Boonwurrung prior to European settlement. The lower slopes of the hill were known as Wango, and were a place where corroborees were held. Three Boonwurrung names have been recorded for this hill: Momo, Wonga and Tubberrubberbil, though the latter is possibly confused with Tubba Rubba creek.

The term Arthurs Seat was first applied to the mountain range, then to a squatting run, next to the pre-emptive right, then to land allotments in the area that is now the suburb McCrae, and currently to the suburb at the summit of the range.

It was named by Acting Lieutenant John Murray when he entered Port Phillip in HMS Lady Nelson (1798) in February 1802, for an apparent resemblance to the hill of Arthur's Seat in Edinburgh (which was his home city).

Captain Matthew Flinders climbed Arthurs Seat on 27 April 1802, noting in his log "The Bluff Mountain on the eastward I estimated at over 1000 feet high, and being near the waterside, possessed a favourable station for observation purposes. I ascend the hill and took an extensive set of bearings from the cleared place to be found on the north western bluff part of the hill." Another notable ascent was in 1844 when Sir John Franklin, a former Governor of Van Diemen's Land, climbed Arthurs seat with Andrew McCrae, the owner of the McCrae Homestead at the foot, and the 8,640-hectare (21,360-acre) Arthur's Seat Run.

It was not until 1853 that a structure was placed on the summit, a trigonometrical station, for survey purposes. The station was burnt down in 1880. In 1883 a new lighthouse was assembled in McCrae making the previously wooden structure redundant, so authorities decided to transport the wooden frame by bullock wagon to the summit for use as a lookout tower where it remained until 1934 when it was again replaced by another tower.

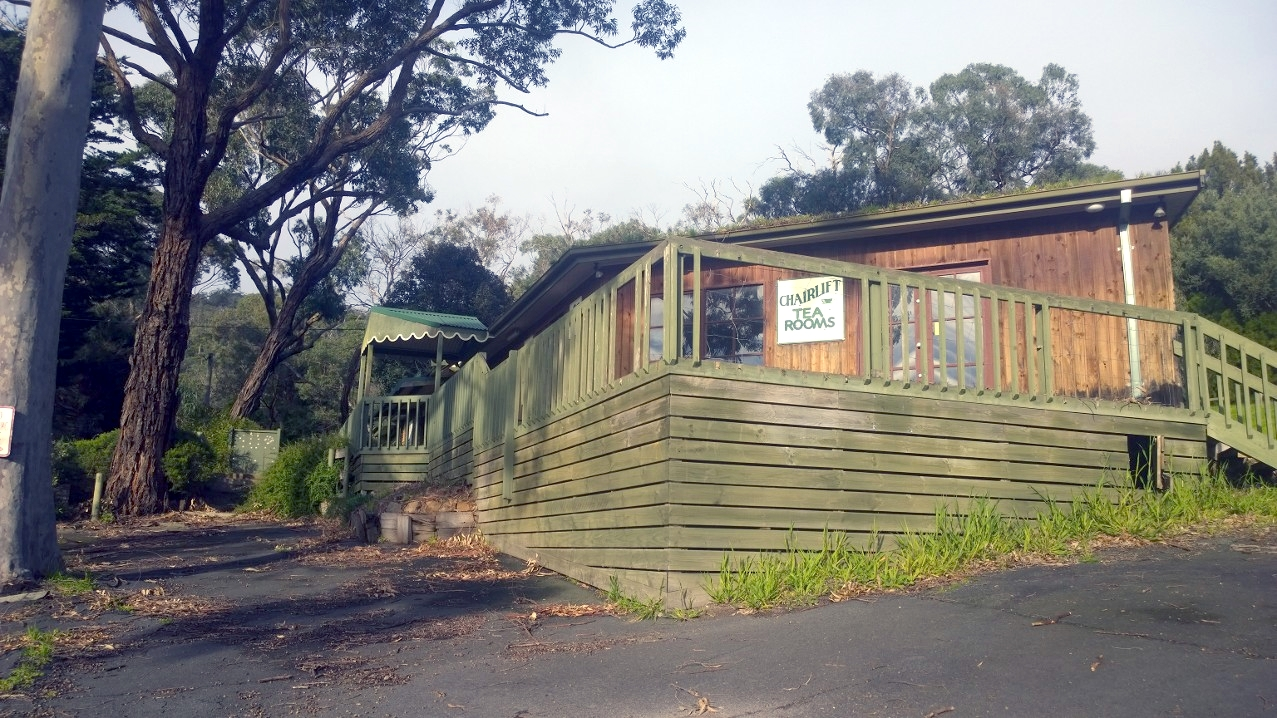
The abandoned building at the base of Arthurs seat, now demolished, in 2014

In 1913 the Flinders Shire Council cut and formed a track for vehicles to the summit. In 1929 the track was re-surveyed, widened, reconstructed and continued to link up with Dromana-Flinders Road The summit area of Arthurs Seat was not recognised as separate of Dromana/McCrae until it was subdivided by council in 1930. before this recognition the summit area as we know it today was titled "Dromana park" or "Arthurs Seat Range" in the southern area of subdivision survey maps from mid to late 1800s displaying the country lands in the parish of Kangerong (now Dromana) The Garden of the Moon opened in 1931 and has brought tourism to the location from the very beginnings of its establishment. It offered attractions such as a dance hall, camera obscura, telescopes, swimming pool, fish-pond, hexagonal kiosk and wishing well. The lookout tower opened in 1934. The 950m long chairlift route was built in 1960. This added to the already well-established tourist attraction, with an estimated 100,000 chairlift users in 2002 according to the Mornington Peninsula Tourism Council. In the 1970s, efforts were made to build a quarry in the area but were blocked by a green ban.

Tourism at the summit has been in decline since both the closure of the chairlift in 2006 and the closure and subsequent removal of the lookout tower in 2012. Chief executive Mark Stone of Parks Victoria called for "new modern infrastructure" in 2009 Development of new infrastructure was disputed and subsequently assessed at a VCAT hearing, VCAT allowing the application despite strong local concern put forward by Save Our Seat.

== Present day ==
Current attractions at Arthurs Seat include Arthurs Seat State Park (including "Seawinds" gardens), a maze, two restaurants and a car museum. The viewing area near the summit has disrupted views of Port Phillip with the Melbourne City skyline and the You Yangs visible on the horizon on a clear day from some of the lookouts.

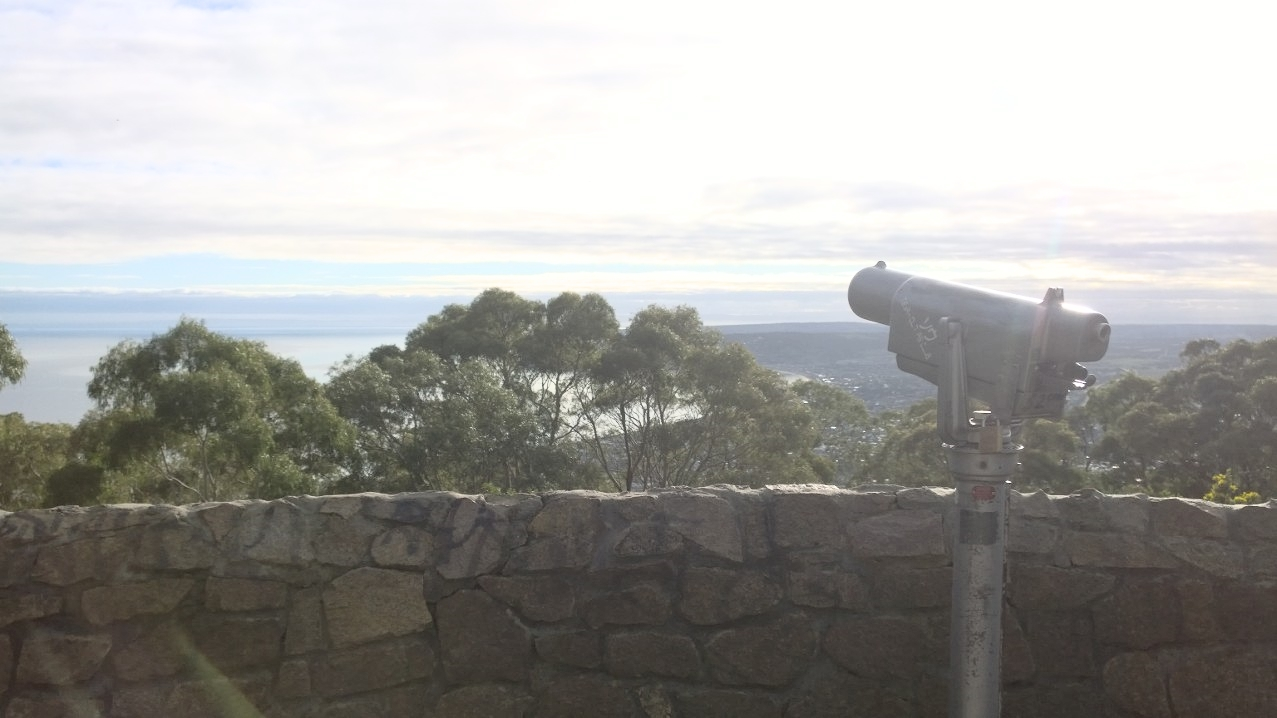
View from the summit lookout of Arthurs Seat, Victoria, Australia. 2014.

The summit is connected to nearby Dromana by a winding tourist road which opened in 1929. The road provides access to the Dromana cemetery on the way to the summit. This hill climb in the past was used for the historic fathers day hill climb, Local governance has allowed the loss of this not for profit community event to make way for commercial events like bicycle races. Prominent viewpoints from the road include Bowens Point (145 m), Franklin Point (195 m), Murrays Lookout (247m), and Chapmans Point (274 m), Due to overgrowth at the higher Chapmans point, Murrays lookout is the best vantage point to view the peninsula itself.

Due to frequent vandalism the higher view points have had their Carved wooden signage (seen in photo) replaced by smaller metal signage in an attempt to lower maintenance.

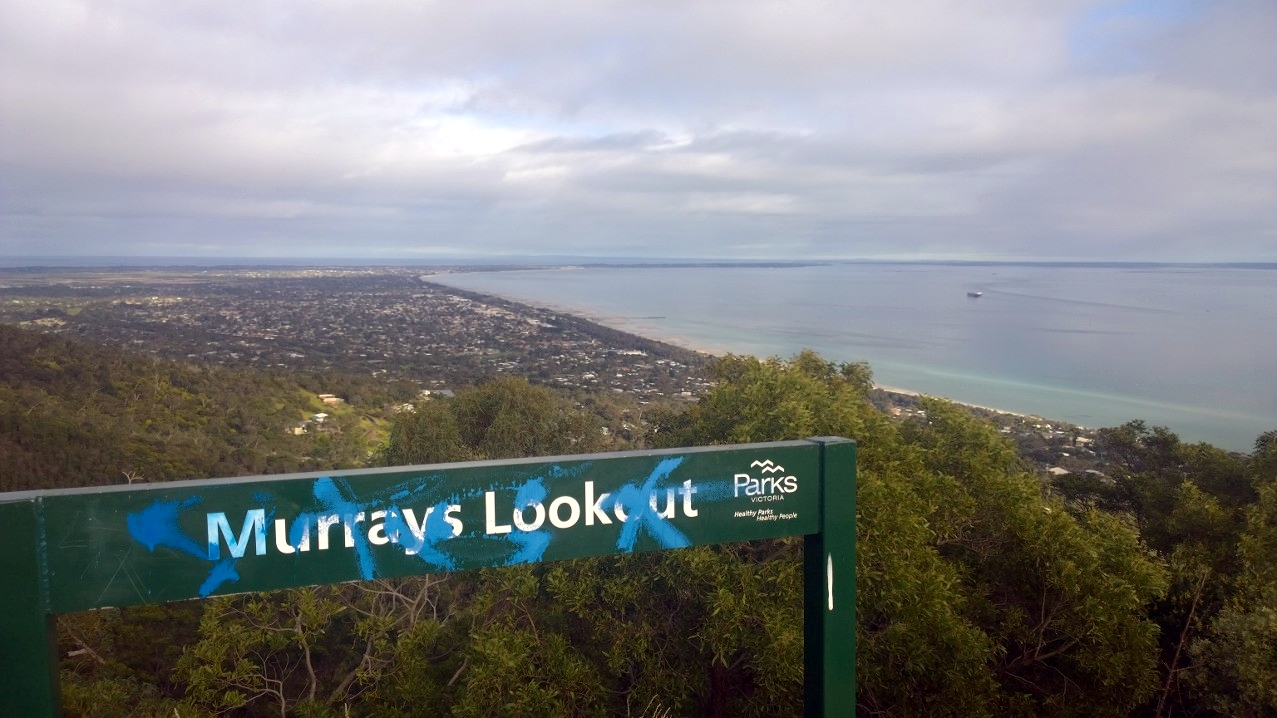
The metal signage that replaced the wooden signage towards the summit in an attempt to reduce vandalism maintenance. Murrays lookout, Arthurs Seat, Victoria, Australia. 2014.

Resistance from local action groups have stalled multiple projects planned for the summit, putting pressure on existing tourism operations that have been closing and moving interstate to seek more supportive community conditions.

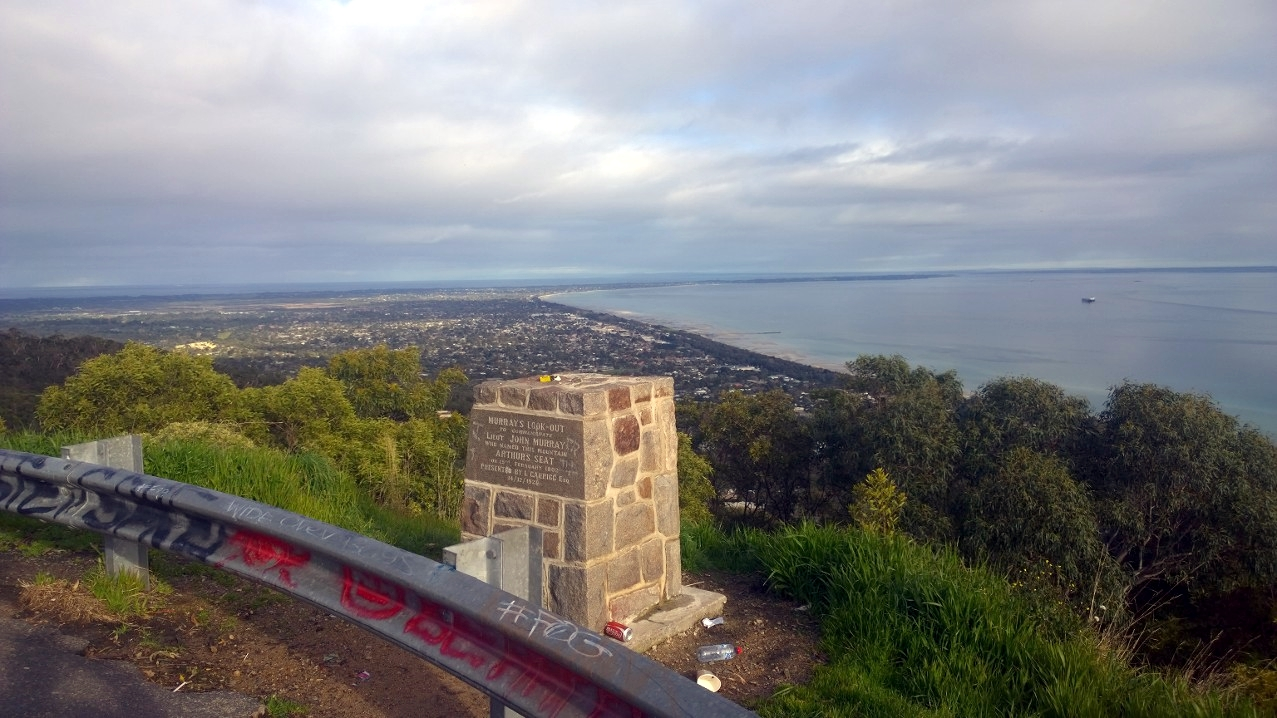
View from Murrays lookout, Arthurs Seat, Victoria, Australia. 2014.

The current occupation of housing is reflective of the locations original intention as a holiday destination with 40% of private dwellings listed as unoccupied.

=== Walking tracks ===
Arthurs Seat boasts an expansive network of marked and unmarked walking tracks. The large number of bush tracks and open bushland can make navigating the officially marked tracks confusing at times.

==== Two Bays walking track ====
The Two Bays walking track runs the length of Arthurs seat state park from Bunurong Track to Waterfall Gully Road. The entire track runs from Dromana to Cape Schanck and is the longest continuous track on the Mornington Peninsula. It was first proposed as a part of celebrating Victoria's 150th Celebrations. Parks Victoria does not recommend visitors attempt the entire track in a single visit, but to instead attempt smaller sections of the walk such as the Arthurs Seat section.

==== Kings Falls Track & Circuit Walk ====
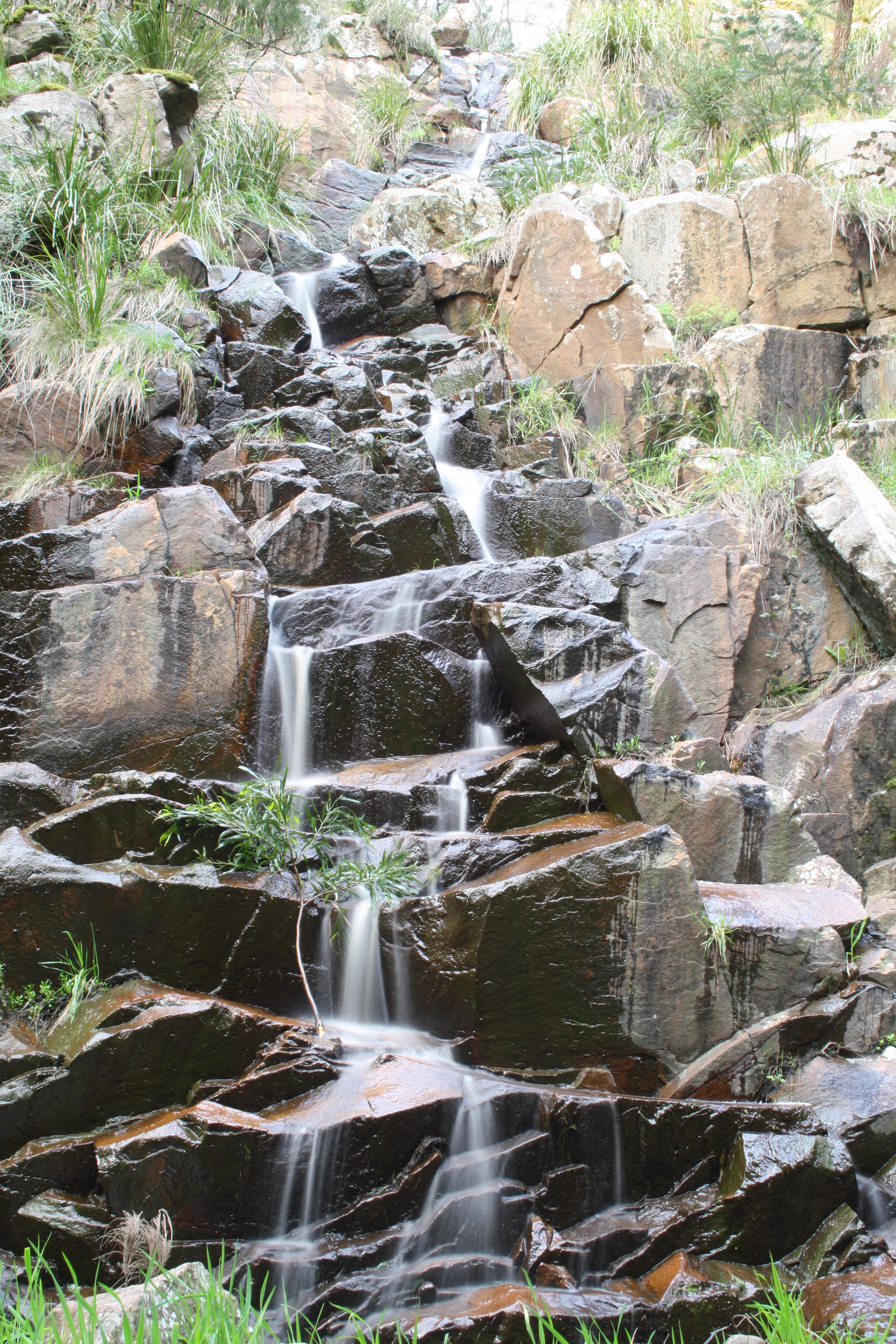
Kings Falls looking up

The Kings Falls Track & Circuit Walk is a picturesque walk suitable for most levels of walker. The Kings Falls Circuit walk starts at the car park on Waterfall Gully Road. Initially, the walk is along a dirt track but this changes in some places to a boardwalk with steps making it easy on the steeper sections. There is a lookout with a view across the valley where the waterfall is visible about 250 metres along the path.

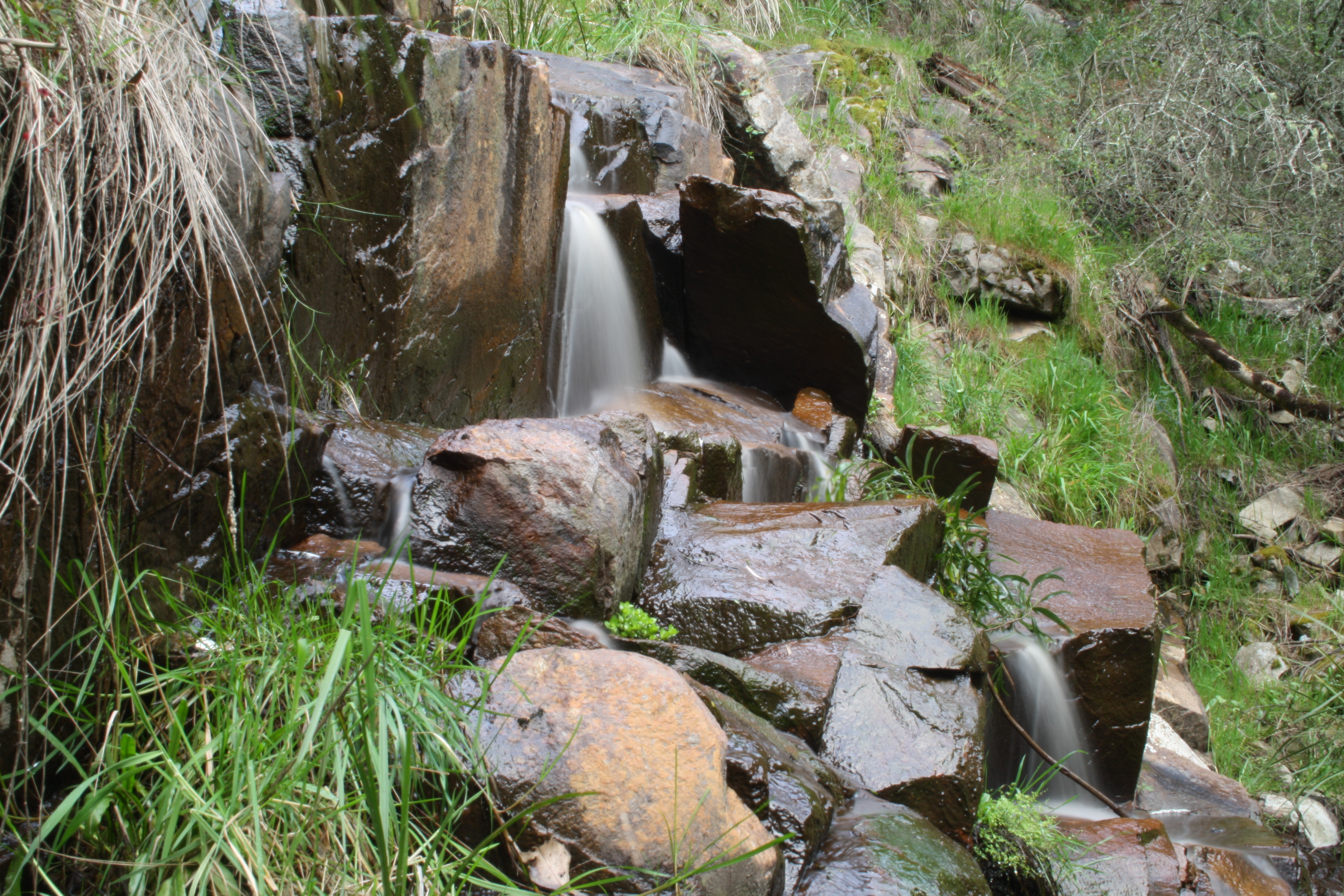
Kings Falls, From high side.

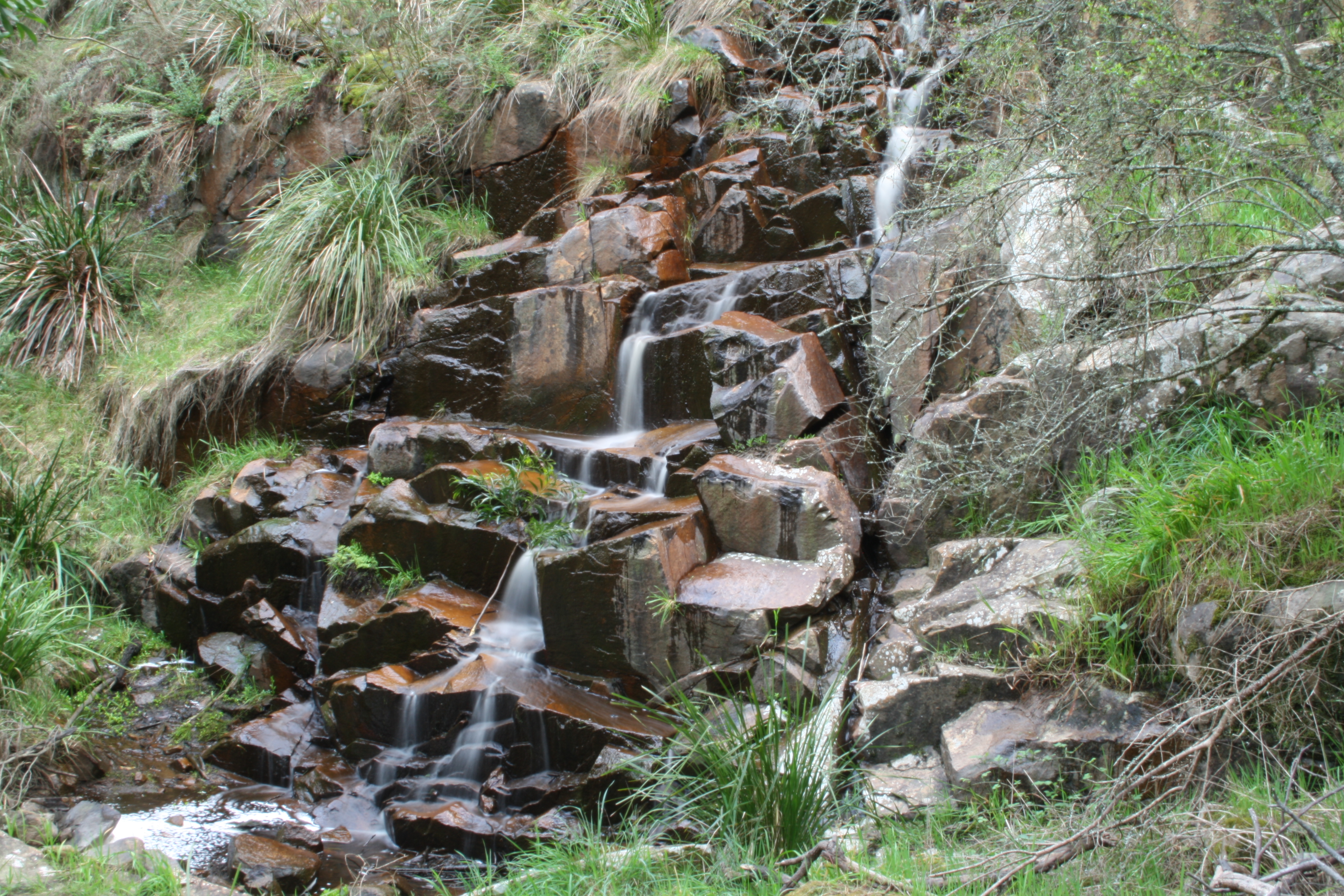
Kings Falls, From low side.

=== Sea Winds ===
Sea winds Gardens is a featured section of the park near the summit maintained by Parks Victoria and volunteers. Access to Sea Winds is via Purves Road a short distance from the summit. Seawinds Gardens encompasses a 34 hectare area at the Summit of Arthurs Seat, 305 metres above sea level. The gardens have views of Port Phillip Bay and the Mornington and Bellarine Peninsulas from the Bay and Northern Lookouts. The combination of indigenous and exotic formal gardens typifies the area.

A network of walking tracks guide visitors through a diverse range of exotic and indigenous gardens. The gardens are used for picnics - with tables, electric BBQs and toilets available adjacent to the car park. Disabled access is available to facilities and walking tracks.

Several mountain bike tracks are located within Seawinds Gardens at Arthurs Seat State Park. These include 'Charlottes Pass', which descends to Alexander Parade as well as Sawtooth and Bowsaw, which traverse to and from McLarens Dam.

=== Arthurs Seat Chairlift ===
==== Construction and history ====
A chairlift at Arthurs Seat was built by Czech-born engineer Vladimir Hájek and opened on 21 December 1960.

As a Melbourne tourist attraction, thanks to the views over Port Phillip Bay and beyond, the lift rose 225m over nearly one kilometre and operated for more than 40 years under two owners, Dr Hájek and Richard Hudson, before being closed after several safety incidents in 2006.

After being closed for a number of years, the chairlift was removed and has now been replaced by a modern Doppelmayr ride called the Arthurs Seat Eagle.

==== Safety incidents and closure ====
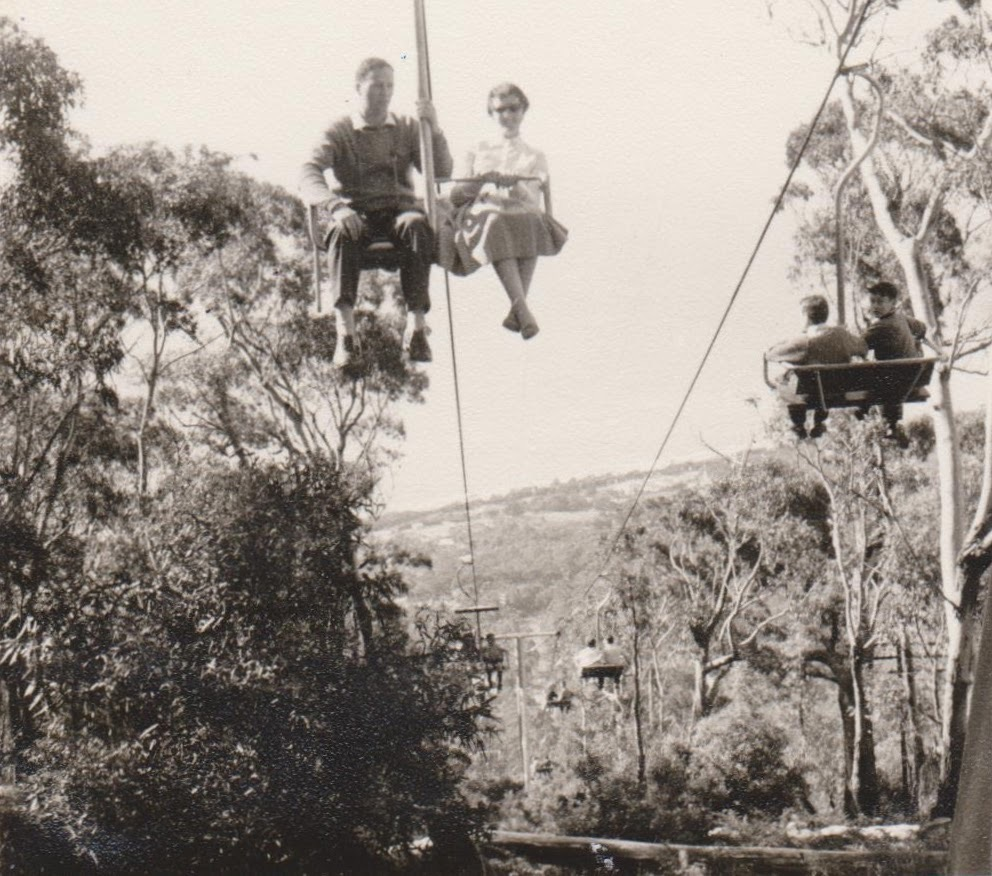
Arthur's Seat chairlift in September 1961

On 3 January 2003, a pylon tower supporting the chairlift collapsed, injuring 18. A subsequent investigation found water had got between the pylon and the concrete base and caused bolts to rust. The chairlift had met the standards required at that time. Safety and testing requirements were subsequently strengthened by the Victorian Government.

After the owner spent $500,000 on extensive repairs, the chairlift reopened a year later, but on 18 March 2004 a second incident occurred when a chair came loose and a 77-year-old woman suffered two broken legs. A WorkSafe Victoria Prohibition Notice effectively closed the ride until further safety improvements were made. The chairlift resumed operations in October 2004.

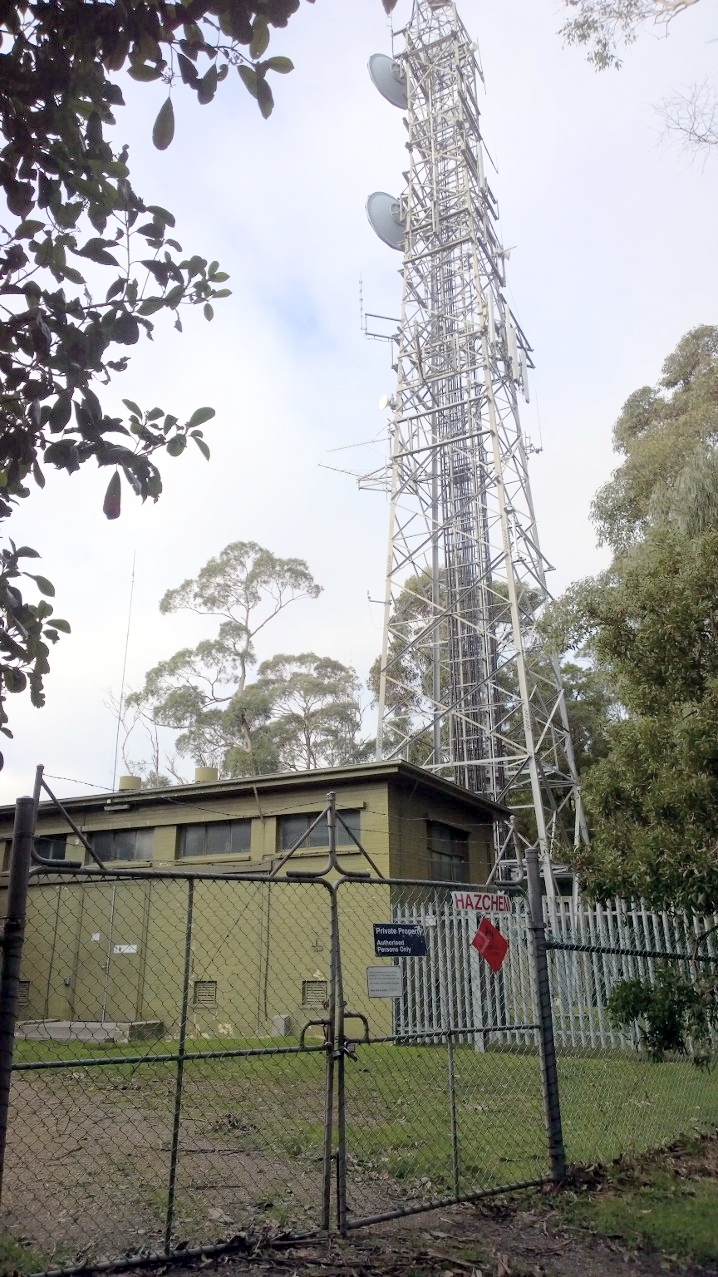
View of the physical summit of Arthurs Seat, taken from the location of the proposed Chairlift Summit station. This is the Telstra Arthurs Seat Radio Terminal which was built in the mid-1950s by the Post Master Generals Department (PMG) to link Melbourne with the Geelong Region and Mornington Peninsula. It is still used for mobile phone, emergency services and other radio communications.

The owner was charged by WorkSafe under section 22 of the Occupational Health and Safety Act over the 2004 incident. After pleading guilty to failing to carry out adequate maintenance, the company was convicted and fined $110,000 in October 2007. This fine was later reduced to $60,000 on appeal.

On 16 May 2006 a mechanical failure stranded, but did not injure, about 12 tourists on the chairlift and resulted in further media attention. In August 2008 the company pleaded guilty to failing to take care of the safety of non-employees. It was not convicted, but ordered to pay $15,000 in costs and ordered to carry out a safety improvement project. This involved a range of works to bring it into line with Canadian chairlift standard Standards Council of Canada Z-98, an audit of safety before it could re-open, and three-monthly reports on compliance with Z-98 for two years. The operator closed the chairlift with a view to move the operation to Mt Lofty on Adelaide's fringe, however this project did not reach fruition.

==== The search for a new chairlift ====
In October 2009 Parks Victoria began looking for an operator to design, build, run and maintain a new chairlift. After some delay, Arthurs Seat Skylift Pty Ltd took on the site and submitted proposals for a larger scale development incorporating all-weather gondolas, allowing a more comfortable all-year rides which was not possible in the past.

By early 2013, the old chairlift's pylons were removed and the top station was demolished. The Arthurs Seat lookout tower was also demolished after many years of being unsafe to operate due to concrete cancer.

In June 2014 Mornington Shire Council approved the plans for the new chairlift in a 5/4 vote. There were 22 letters of support from groups such as, The National Trust; Puffing Billy; Phillip Island Nature Reserve; Tourism Victoria; Victorian Tourism Industry Council; Western Port Tourism Inc.; Tourism & Transport Forum Australia;

A group of local residents objected and unsuccessfully appealed against the council's decision at VCAT.

In April 2016, the Victorian Government revoked the council's authority to oversee the project. This followed the council's unusual decision to remove the standard delegation to its executive to handle minor consent matters during construction.

Construction work for the new chair lift and associated upper and lower complexes began in October 2015. The new chairlift started carrying passengers in December 2016.

== See also ==
- Shire of Flinders – Arthurs Seat was previously within this former local government area.
