= Shoreham, Victoria =

Shoreham
- Town
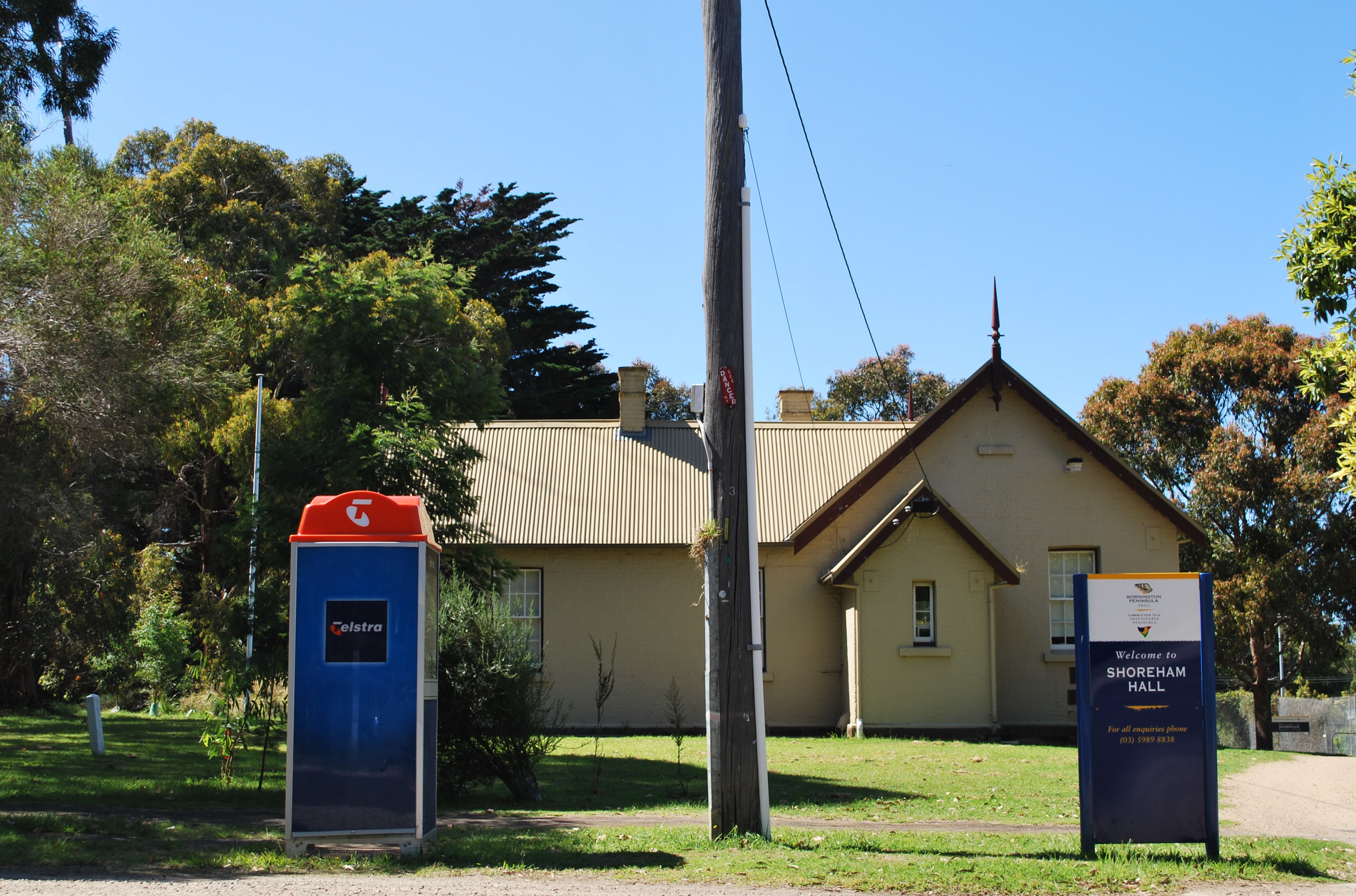
- Public hall

- Interactive map of Shoreham
- Coordinates: 38.427°S 145.050°E
- Country: Australia
- State: Victoria
- LGA: Shire of Mornington Peninsula
- Location: 98 km (61 mi) from Melbourne; 19 km (12 mi) from Rosebud

Government
  - State electorate: Nepean
  - Federal division: Flinders

Population
  - Total: 679 (2021 census)
- Postcode: 3916
Localities around Shoreham
Red Hill	Point Leo	Point Leo
Red Hill	Shoreham	Point Leo
Flinders	Flinders	Western Port

Shoreham is a town located on the shore of Western Port bay on the Mornington Peninsula in the Australian state of Victoria. It lies within the Shire of Mornington Peninsula local government area, about 68 km (42 mi) south-east of the central business district of Melbourne. Shoreham recorded a population of 679 at the 2021 census.

Shoreham is in the southern Mornington Peninsula region on the Western Port, located on its shores around the mouth of Stoney Creek. It is a coastal recreation resort rich in artistic history, notable for its pine-covered cliffs, foreshore reserve, and Honeysuckle Beach.

== History ==
Shoreham began as a port for timber exports from the surrounding area. Early reports of the area suggested the region was "thick with honeysuckle and sheoak" and early settlers in the Balnarring and Hastings region were involved in wattle bark stripping and cutting piles and sleepers for shipping to Melbourne via the town. Shoreham Post Office opened on 1 October 1881.

=== Heritage listings ===
The following places in Shoreham are listed on the Victorian Heritage Register:

- Lyncroft, 410 Tucks Road
- The Pines Foreshore Reserve, commonly called The Pines, Beach Road and Cliff Road

== Artists ==
Shoreham has a rich artistic history in Australian art, as a place where artists have resided and painted, most notably Clifton Pugh, Colin Colahan, John Perceval and Charles Blackman. Several homes and paintings bear testimony to their work. There is also iron work by Matcham Skipper and frescos by Clifton Pugh.

== Today ==
Shoreham today is a small coastal town containing a post office, tennis courts, community hall and CFA, picnic and barbecue facilities, and a boat launch access over Honeysuckle beach. Whilst predominantly the refuge of private homes and farms, there are various accommodation options such as B&Bs, a caravan park and camping sites.

Shoreham is served by the bus route 782 bus route operated by Ventura Bus Lines between Frankston railway station and Flinders. The town is also within 15 minutes driving distance of the Stony Point railway line, which connects travellers to the metropolitan Melbourne railway network.

== See also ==
- Shire of Flinders – Parts of Shoreham were previously within this former local government area.
- Shire of Hastings – Parts of Shoreham were previously within this former local government area.
