= Shire of Mornington =

Shire of Mornington can relate to one of two Local government in Australia:

- The current Shire of Mornington (Queensland)
- The former Shire of Mornington (Victoria) (amalgamated into Shire of Mornington Peninsula)
