= Red Hill South =

- Town
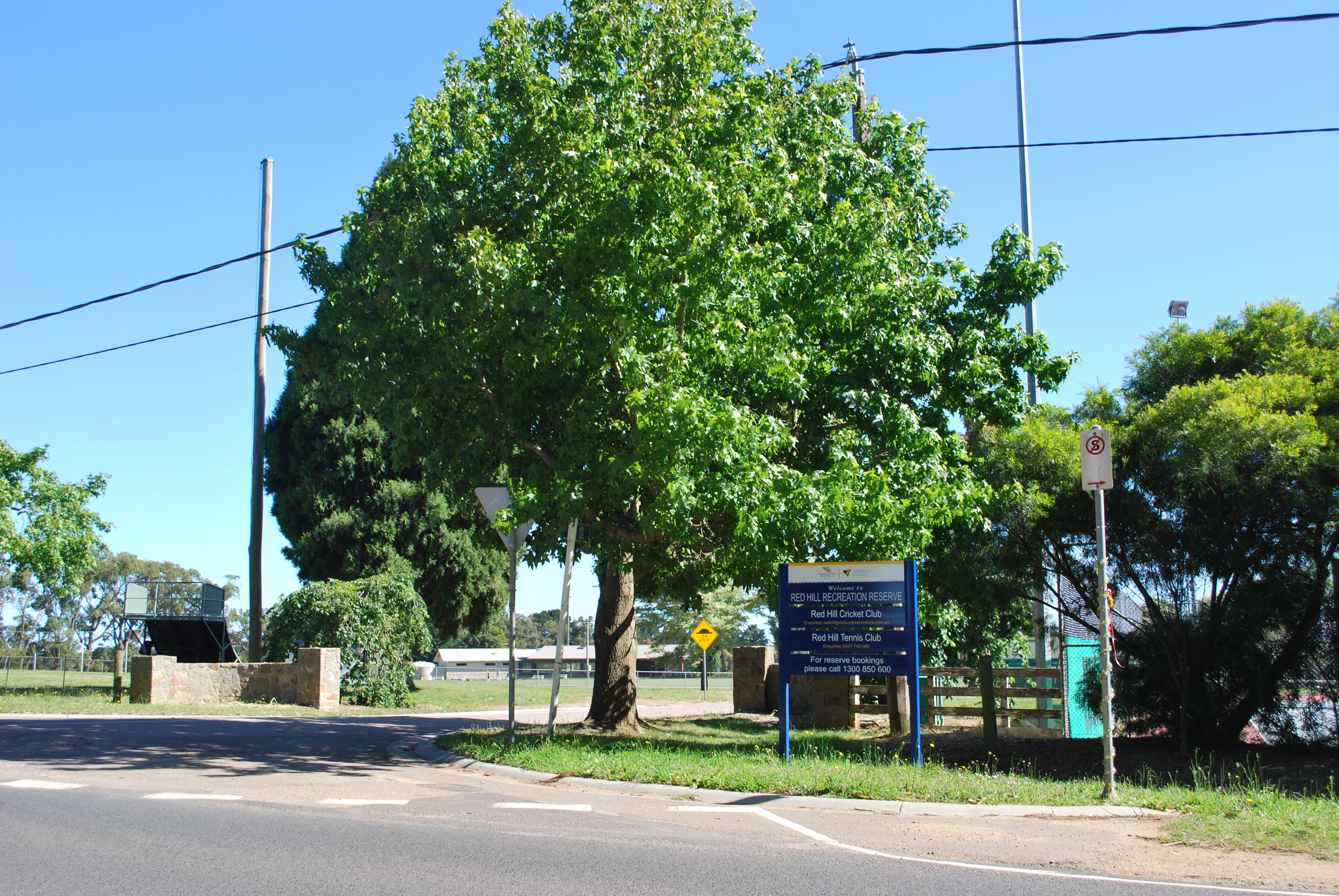
- Red Hill Recreation Reserve

- Interactive map of Red Hill South
- Coordinates: 38.384°S 145.024°E
- Country: Australia
- State: Victoria
- LGA: Shire of Mornington Peninsula
- Location: 94.5 km (58.7 mi) from Melbourne; 16 km (9.9 mi) from Rosebud

Government
  - State electorate: Nepean
  - Federal division: Flinders

Population
  - Total: 466 (UCL 2021)
- Postcode: 3937
Localities around Red Hill South
Red Hill	Merricks North	Balnarring
Red Hill	Red Hill South	Balnarring
Point Leo	Point Leo	Balnarring

Red Hill South is a town on the Mornington Peninsula in Melbourne, and is located in Victoria, Australia, approximately 64 km (40 mi) south-east of Melbourne's Central Business District, located within the Shire of Mornington Peninsula local government area. Red Hill South recorded a population of 708 at the 2021 census.

There are several wineries in the area and it is referred to as the 'hinterland' of the Mornington Peninsula.

Red Hill South Post Office opened on 22 January 1923.

== See also ==
- Shire of Hastings – Red Hill South was previously within this former local government area.
