= Main Ridge =

Main Ridge may refer to:

- Main Ridge, Victoria, a suburb in Melbourne, Australia.
- The Main Ridge, Tobago, the main mountainous spine of the island of Tobago.
