= Shire of Flinders =

Shire of Flinders may refer to one of two local government areas in Australia, each named after Captain Matthew Flinders:

- The current Shire of Flinders (Queensland)
- The former Shire of Flinders (Victoria)
