= Rosebud Sound Shell =

Heritage-listed venue in Melbourne, Victoria, Australia

- Location of the sound shell in Greater Metropolitan Melbourne
- Interactive map of Rosebud Sound Shell
- Address: 988 Point Nepean Road, Rosebud, Mornington Peninsula, Melbourne, Victoria; Australia
- Coordinates: 38°21′21″S 144°54′03″E
- Seating type: Outdoor; picnic-style
- Type: Sound shell
- Roof: 23 by 21 m (75 by 69 ft) hyperbolic paraboloid

Construction
- Built: 1967–1969
- Opened: 1969; 57 years ago
- Architect: Ronald Murcott
- Builder: Trevor J. Luck
- Structural engineer: John Brotchie
- Services engineer: J. L. van der Molen

Site notes
- Material: Reinforced concrete

Victorian Heritage Register
- Official name: Rosebud Sound Shell
- Type: Registered place
- Designated: 8 March 2012
- Reference no.: H2299
- Heritage overlay no.: HO409
- Category: Community Facilities

The Rosebud Sound Shell is a sound shell located at 988 Point Nepean Road in Rosebud, on the Mornington Peninsula, in the south eastern suburbs of Melbourne, in Victoria, Australia.

Built in 1969 on the traditional lands of the Bunurong people, the venue was added to the Victorian Heritage Register on 8 March 2012 in recognition of its architectural, aesthetic, and scientific (technical) significance. and was also added to a non-statutory list by the Victorian branch of the National Trust on 26 July 2010.

== History ==
The Rosebud Sound Shell was commissioned in 1967 by the Rosebud Foreshore Committee from the local architect Ronald Murcott and was completed in 1969. Rosebud had become a popular holiday camp site and recreation area, and the sound shell was part of a series of improvements made along the foreshore in the 1960s. Murcott had an interest in the unusual roof forms popular in the post-war period and their potential to span large spaces. He had already designed a church and a car park with roofs in the form of a hyperbolic paraboloid (or hypar), a special form of double-curved shell, the geometry of which is generated by straight lines, which makes it fairly easy to construct. Murcott used the same form for the sound shell, in this case of reinforced concrete construction. Murcott was assisted in the design by engineer John Brotchie of the CSIRO Division of Building Research, an expert in the analysis of concrete shell structures, and J. L. van der Molen, a local pioneer in the application of computer technology to the design of concrete structures. The builder was Trevor J. Luck.

== Description ==
The Rosebud Sound Shell, located on the Rosebud foreshore, is a reinforced concrete structure with a self-supporting hyperbolic paraboloid-shaped roof sheltering a stage and amenity rooms. The structure has a free-standing reinforced concrete shell in the form of a hyperbolic paraboloid above a stage on one side and several enclosed rooms (formerly toilets and storage facilities) at the rear. The roof plan is roughly a diamond-shape, measuring 23 by 21 metres (75 by 69 ft). The thickness of the shell varies from 762 millimetres (30.0 in) along the central axis to 508 millimetres (20.0 in) where the lower corners touch the ground. On the stage side the roof rises 8.8 metres (29 ft) high and, at 4.9 metres (16 ft), is slightly lower at the rear. The walls below the roof are of concrete block construction. These have now been painted with murals. Since the structure was completed barriers have been added at the lower corners to prevent access to the roof.

== See also ==
- Architecture of Melbourne
- List of contemporary amphitheatres
- List of places on the Victorian Heritage Register in the Shire of Mornington Peninsula
