= Baxter, Victoria =

Baxter
- Town
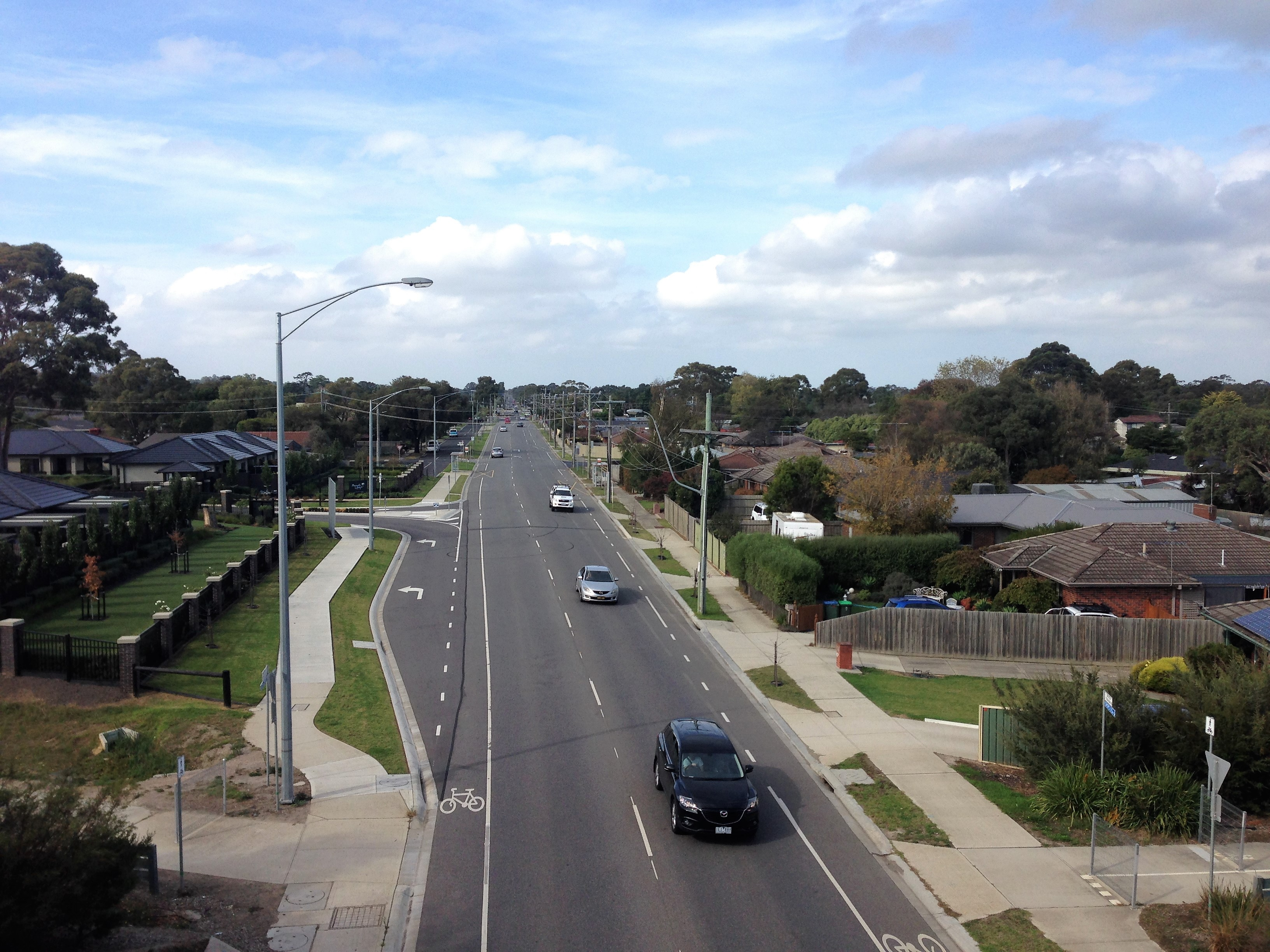
- Main street of Baxter, 2016

- Interactive map of Baxter
- Coordinates: 38.196°S 145.157°E
- Country: Australia
- State: Victoria
- LGA: Shire of Mornington Peninsula
- Location: 48 km (30 mi) from Melbourne; 7 km (4.3 mi) from Frankston
- Established: 1890s

Government
  - State electorates: Hastings; Mornington
  - Federal division: Flinders

Area
  - Total: 3.1 km^{2} (1.2 sq mi)

Population
  - Total: 2,166 (2021 census)
  - Density: 699/km^{2} (1,810/sq mi)
- Postcode: 3911
Localities around Baxter
Mount Eliza	Frankston South	Langwarrin South
Mount Eliza	Baxter	Pearcedale
Mornington	Moorooduc	Somerville

Baxter is a surburb in the Shire of Mornington Peninsula, Victoria, Australia, located 48 km (30 mi) south-east of Melbourne's Central Business District. Baxter recorded a population of 2,166 at the 2021 census.

It is served by Baxter railway station on the Stony Point railway line.

== History ==
Originally named Baxter's Flat, Baxter was founded by pastoralist Benjamin Baxter, who lived in a property named Carrup Carrup - the Aboriginal name. The property still exists on what is now the Frankston-Flinders Road, as does the original cottage in which he and his wife Martha lived. Benjamin Baxter died in 1892 and his gravestone, found in the Frankston Cemetery, reads "Benjamin Baxter, late of h. m. 50th regiment. Died at Currup Currup 15 May 1892, aged 87. Also Martha, beloved wife of above 31 January 1906 age 94 years".

It was at Baxter's Flat that the rail line to Mornington branched from the line to Stony Point. The station was called Mornington Junction before being changed to Baxter. Its role as a junction ended in 1981 with the closure of the Mornington line.

The early township grew around the railway station, and a post office named Mornington Junction was opened on 1 December 1892, renamed Baxter in 1918.

Other historic cottages in the area include an early Colonial 1870s homestead called Sages Cottage, also known as Eurutta, and a 1920s American-style residence called Mulberry Hill.

Baxter Primary School was established in 1890.

=== Heritage listing ===
The following place in Baxter is listed on the Victorian Heritage Register:

- Sages Cottage, 85 Sages Road

== Sport ==
Baxter Soccer Club has been around for many years and compete in the Football Victoria leagues. Their home ground is located at Baxter Park.

Mornington Peninsula Pony Club provides dressage, show jumping and cross-country facilities for young equestrian enthusiasts. The club holds its rallies each month at Baxter Park and is affiliated with the Pony Club Association of Victoria.

== Notable people ==
- Blake Williams, professional freestyle motocross rider

== See also ==
- City of Cranbourne – Parts of Baxter were previously within this former local government area.
- City of Frankston (former) – Parts of Baxter were previously within this former local government area.
- Shire of Hastings – Parts of Baxter were previously within this former local government area.
