= Shire of Hastings =

Coordinates: 38°18′S 145°11′E

Shire of Hastings Victoria
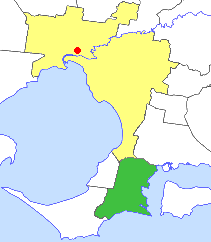
- Location in Melbourne
- The Shire of Hastings as at its dissolution in 1994
- Population: 30,600 (1992)
  - Density: 100.46/km^{2} (260.2/sq mi)
- Established: 1960
- Area: 304.6 km^{2} (117.6 sq mi)
- Council seat: Hastings
- Region: Mornington Peninsula
- County: Mornington
LGAs around Shire of Hastings:
Frankston	Cranbourne	Cranbourne
Mornington	Shire of Hastings	Western Port
Flinders	Western Port	Western Port

The Shire of Hastings was a local government area about 60 kilometres (37 mi) south-southeast of Melbourne, the state capital of Victoria, Australia, encompassing the eastern extremity of the Mornington Peninsula. The shire covered an area of 304.6 square kilometres (117.6 sq mi), and existed from 1960 until 1994.

== History ==
The Mornington Road District was created on 6 November 1860, and became a shire on 24 November 1871. On 31 May 1893, it was renamed the Shire of Frankston and Hastings, and lost its western riding to the New Mornington Shire, which itself was later renamed the Shire of Mornington.

On 19 October 1960, the Central and Eastern Ridings of the Shire of Frankston were severed, and with parts of the Eastern Riding of the Shire of Flinders, were incorporated as the Shire of Hastings.

On 15 December 1994, the Shire of Hastings was abolished, and along with the Shires of Flinders and Mornington, and a small part of the City of Frankston, was merged into the newly created Shire of Mornington Peninsula. The Age reported in July 1994 that the result had been supported by Hastings and Mornington councils from the beginning, but opposed by Flinders, which wanted to merge with the southern coastal section of Hastings.

Council formerly met at the Shire Offices, at High Street and Marine Parade, Hastings. The facility is still used today by the Shire of Mornington Peninsula.

== Wards ==
The Shire of Hastings was divided into four ridings, each of which elected three councillors:

- Balnarring Riding
- Bittern Riding
- Hastings Riding
- Somers Riding

== Suburbs and localities ==
- Balnarring
- Balnarring Beach
- Baxter (shared with the Cities of Cranbourne and Frankston)
- Bittern
- Crib Point
- Hastings*
- HMAS Cerberus
- Merricks
- Merricks Beach
- Merricks North
- Moorooduc (shared with the Shire of Mornington)
- Point Leo
- Red Hill South
- Shoreham (shared with the Shire of Flinders)
- Somers
- Somerville
- Tyabb

* Council seat.

== Population ==
Year	Population
1954	2,622
1958	2,950*
1961	6,883
1966	7,274
1971	8,927
1976	13,142
1981	17,751
1986	23,216
1991	28,742

* Estimate in the 1958 Victorian Year Book.
