= Rosebud (schooner) =

Rosebud was a schooner originally built at Henry Barrick, Whitby, Yorkshire (England), of oak, coppered and copper-fastened in 1841, the vessel was 71 feet (21.7 m) long, had a breadth of 19 feet (5.9 m), and a depth of 12 feet (3.8 m).

== Ownership ==
The Vessel is known to have been sold sometime in January 1855, to James Purves from Luttrell Bros. (The company owned by the grandparents of Dr. Edmund Hobson and his illegitimate brother Edward William Hobson). It appears that the vessel had a different configuration of sails at the time of selling being that of a Brigantine. James Purves stated he was owner and was a plaintiff in a number a court cases over a two-year period, over the insurance claim of the vessel.

== Fate and Grounding location ==
It is thought that the vessel has beached and wrecked in Rosebud on 2 June 1855, though historical newspaper evidence disputes this claim. A series of court cases brought by James Purves, showed the in fact the vessel was abandoned, the advertised location of the vessel is stated to be a mile from Arthurs Seat closer to Mt Martha and not South, and also lay intact with little damage and for a period of almost two years, considering the first advertisement so far found from 28 December 1855 to the last on 23 December 1857, with the vessel being sold to the highest bidder at 12pm by H.A. Coffy on behalf of the underwriters of the vessel W.M. Tennent and Co. at the Hall of Commerce in Collins Street. Based on this information it is high likely that the vessel was indeed salvaged.

== More information to be uncovered ==
Considering the number of legal cases that ran over a two-year period around the vessel by James Purves, it is highly likely that a large amount of factual information lies undisclosed from the cases, in the Public Record Office Victoria.

Purves v. Smyth - At least two cases.

Purves v. Kent - One case.

Purves v. Martin - At least two cases.

There is also a second vessel called Rosebud also a schooner around at the time that the Purves owned ship lay abandoned in 1856. Shipping intelligence shows another "Rosebud" schooner entering in and out of Port Phillip bay, it may be possible that once sold the salvaged vessel Rosebud was renamed.

== Urban Myth ==
Advertising for the vessel also stated that the vessel has all it tackle and gear, on board the ship. This now raises substantial questions about how Rosebud was named as it looks like the ship was not ransacked or plundered, it had been stated by Isobelle Moresby in her 1955 brochure "Rosebud, Flower of the Peninsula", that "her planks made fishermen's huts and fences, and house wives delighted in her salvaged damask." The article also points out that the original name of the town Rosebud was in fact Wul-Wulu-Buluk cited by Isobelle Moresby as "Wooloowoolooboolook" and not Banksia Point as some people think.
