= Red Hill, Victoria =

Red Hill
- Town
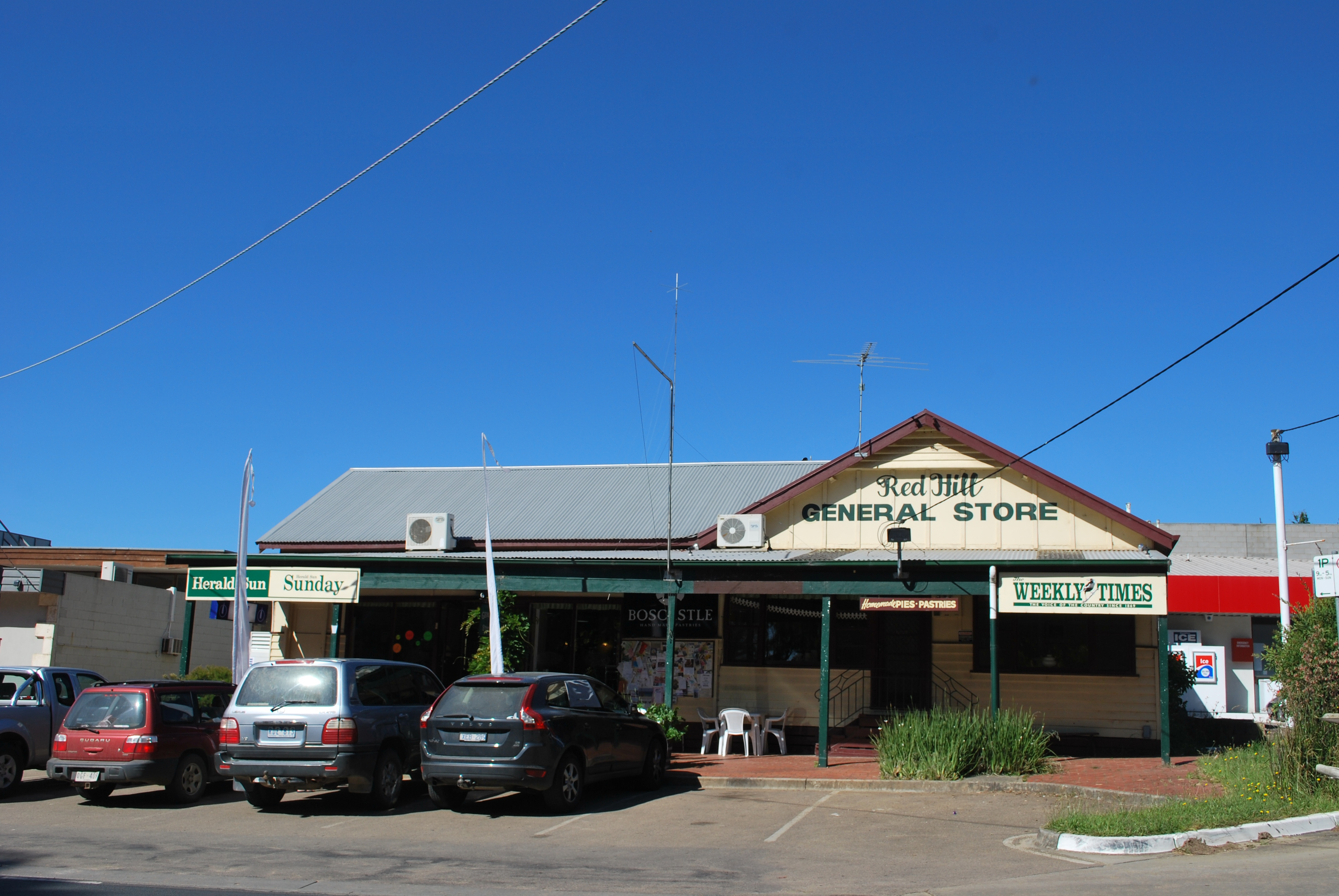
- General store

- Interactive map of Red Hill
- Coordinates: 38.355°S 145.016°E
- Country: Australia
- State: Victoria
- LGA: Shire of Mornington Peninsula
- Location: 92 km (57 mi) from Melbourne; 14 km (8.7 mi) from Rosebud

Government
  - State electorate: Nepean
  - Federal division: Flinders

Population
  - Total: 1,009 (2021 census)
- Postcode: 3937
Localities around Red Hill
| Safety Beach | Mount Martha | Merricks North |
| Main Ridge | Red Hill | Red Hill South |
| Flinders | Shoreham | Point Leo |

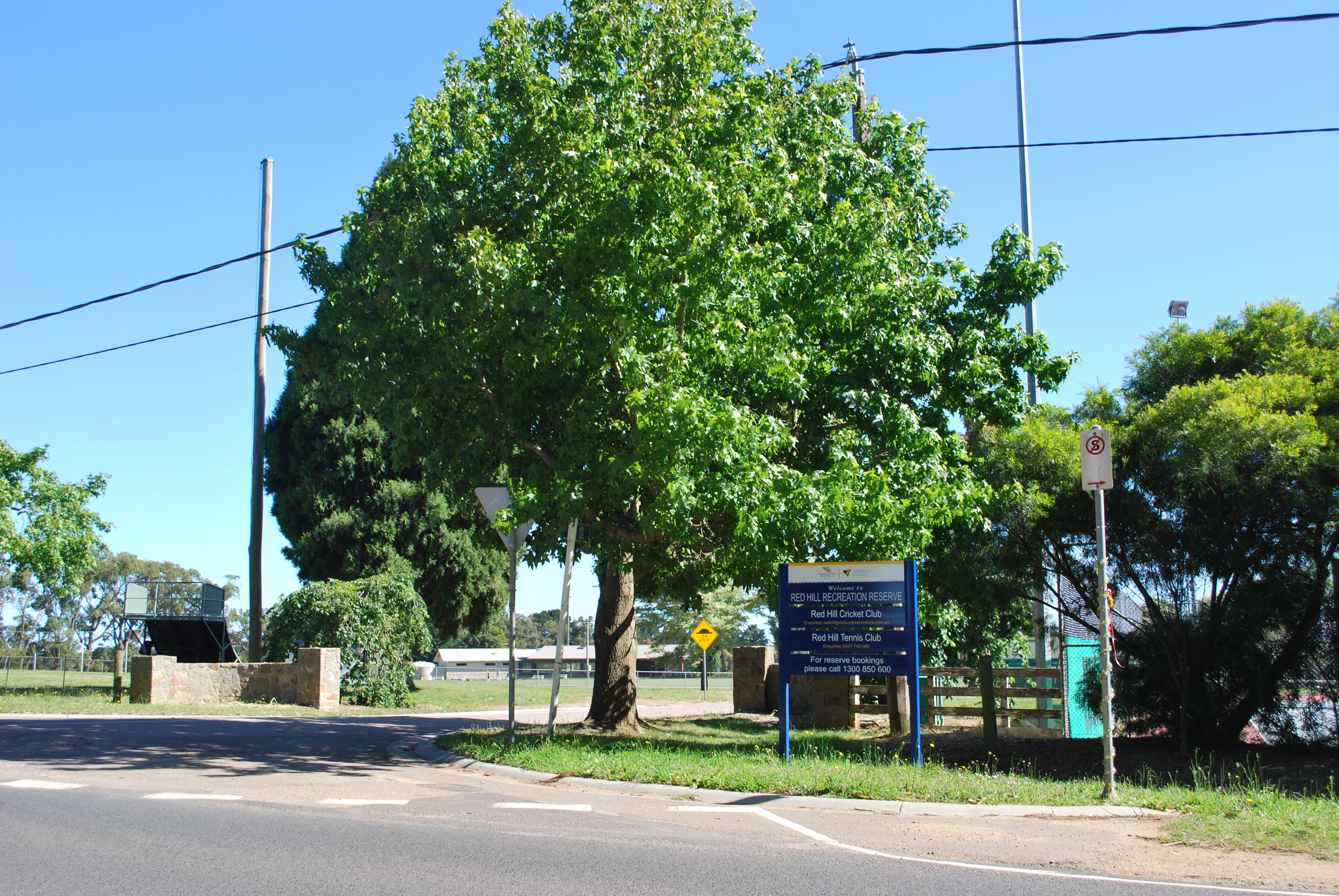
Red Hill Recreation Reserve

Red Hill is a town on the Mornington Peninsula in Melbourne, Victoria, Australia, approximately 63 km (39 mi) south-east of Melbourne's Central Business District, located within the Shire of Mornington Peninsula local government area. Red Hill recorded a population of 1,009 at the 2021 census.

Red Hill is located in the hinterland of the Mornington Peninsula, about an hour's drive south of Melbourne.

== History ==
Red Hill was so named due to the rich, red soil colour found in this locality. The area now known as Red Hill contains land in three parishes: Kangerong, Wannaeue (only 626 acres) and Balnarring. Kangerong is north of Arthurs Seat Road and west of Red Hill Road, Wannaeue is west of Mornington-Flinders Road. The rest of Red Hill and Red Hill South are in Balnarring parish.

Many Red Hill roads are named after early pioneering families: Sheehan, McIlroy, Stanley, Bayne, Herriott, Oscar, Oscar, Lolat, Nash, Prossor, Perry (sic) and Callanan.

Red Hill Post Office opened on 1 August 1871. A railway also operated here between 1921 and 1953, and was known as the Red Hill railway line.

== Today ==
The town has an Australian rules football team, called the Hillmen, competing in the Mornington Peninsula Nepean Football League. They won their first Division Two premiership back in 1990. Their most recent Division Two premiership was 2019, which saw them move into Division One in 2020. In 2026, one year after being relegated, Red Hill won the premiership in Division 2, promoting themselves back into division 1.

A monthly community market is held from September through May. Patrons can still watch old-time games like Pétanque being played and smell the roasting of chestnuts. Other traditional Australian foods such as meat pies and jam donuts are also sold.

Since the 1970s, wineries have been established around Red Hill to take advantage of the microclimates that suits cool-climate grapes, and especially pinot noir. Strawberries, cherries and apples are also grown and available seasonally at the farm door.

== Notable residents ==
- Herbert Robinson (1876–1919) – later mayor of Albany, Western Australia,

== See also ==
- Shire of Flinders – Red Hill was previously within this former local government area.
