= Arthurs Seat Eagle =

Cable car system operating in Victoria, Australia

Coordinates: 38.3450°S 144.9521°E

Overview
- Status: Operational
- System: Gondola lift
- Location: Arthurs Seat, Victoria, Australia
- No. of stations: 2
- Open: 3 December 2016; 9 years ago

Operation
- Owner: Arthurs Seat Eagle Pty Ltd
- Carrier capacity: 24 gondolas, maximum of 8 adult passengers per cabin
- Trip duration: 15 min

Technical features
- Line length: 1030 metres
- Operating speed: 1.5 m/s (5.4 kph) to 3 m/s (10.8 kph)
- Vertical Interval: 231 metres

The Arthurs Seat Eagle is a gondola lift operated from the base station in Dromana to the summit of Arthurs Seat in the Mornington Peninsula in Victoria, Australia. Construction commenced in October 2015 and was completed on 5 September 2016 for $20 million. The lift officially opened on 3 December 2016. It replaced the Arthurs Seat Chairlift, which closed in 2006 after several safety issues. Arthurs Seat Eagle briefly went into administration in March 2020 when Covid caused it to shut down, although it is now operational again.
