= The Pines Foreshore Reserve =

Heritage-listed nature reserve in Melbourne, Victoria, Australia

- Interactive map of The Pines Foreshore Reserve
- Location: Beach Road, Shoreham, Mornington Peninsula, Melbourne, Victoria
- Coordinates: 38°26′15″S 145°02′41″E
- Created: 1903; 123 years ago

Victorian Heritage Register
- Official name: The Pines (Foreshore Reserve)
- Type: Registered place
- Designated: 19 December 2002
- Reference no.: H1996
- Heritage overlay no.: HO327
- Category: Parks, Gardens and Trees

Register of the National Estate
- Official name: The Pines (Foreshore Reserve)
- Type: Defunct register
- Designated: undated
- Reference no.: 103871

The Pines Foreshore Reserve, commonly called The Pines, is a reserve containing approximately 250 Monterey pine trees, located at the southern end of Beach Road in Shoreham, on the Mornington Peninsula, an outer south-eastern suburb of Melbourne, in Victoria, Australia.

Since the 1950s, the Pines are also well-known as a surfing location, with an exposed point break with reasonably consistent surf.

The reserve was added to the Victorian Heritage Register on 19 December 2002 in recognition of its aesthetic, historical, and social significance; and was also added to the non-statutory and now defunct Register of the National Estate on unknown date.

== History ==
The area around the present township of Shoreham was settled in the 1840s and 1850s by Charles Manton, a squatter, and then by Henry Tuck who took over Manton's run in 1846. The run consisted 2,600 hectares (6,400 acres) from Flinders to present day Shoreham. In c. 1855, Tuck obtained the pre-emptive right of 260 hectares (640 acres) at Mantons Creek. The Roman Catholic Church purchased land for a church at the corner of Flinders Road and Beach Road in 1871. The remaining land along Beach Road was sold in 1887. One of the purchasers of land in Shoreham at that time was John Thomas Thorold Smith KC, a lawyer, who built a cliff-top house called Sheldon on 329 hectares (812 acres) on the northern bank of the Stony Creek.

Shoreham developed as a holiday destination between c. 1916 and 1929, when substantial houses were built along the cliff. The Shoreham beach was advertised as a seaside resort in 1923, when the subdivision of Shoreham-by-the-Sea was advertised for sale to prospective holiday home owners. Within the advertising brochure, the real estate agent noted the “eastern aspect sheltered from the prevailing strong south-west winds” which ensured “luxuriant growth, right to the water’s edge”. However by 1939, Shoreham was still sparsely occupied, with only a few houses on Beach Road.

Nineteenth-century settlers cleared the land of native vegetation and then realised they needed to protect their crops, orchards or gardens from strong winds. Pines and cypresses were a common choice as windrows. Additionally, pines and cypresses have traditionally been associated with seaside resorts and passive recreation. The use of exotic trees in the seaside landscape in Victoria was an attempt, quite consciously, to imitate the appearance of English seaside resorts. Foreshore reserves were planted with conifers, such as at Sorrento, where the esplanade is lined with cypresses and pines planted in the early 1900s; and the Pines Flora and Fauna Reserve, near Frankston North.

The origin of the pines at Shoreham is not entirely clear. They may have been planted by early holiday makers and/or local settlers including:

- Mrs James Byrne — who had 130 hectares (310 acres) between Stony Creek and the road on which were established “a young plantation of pines and other ornamental trees”;
- John Thomas Thorold Smith KC — who owned the property Sheldon, at the end of Cliff Road; and
- Sir Clive Fitts — a Melbourne physician whose Beach Road holiday home bordered the foreshore reserve.

== Description ==
The foreshore reserve contains a stand of approximately 250 Monterey Pine trees (Pinus radiata) on the foreshore at the southern end of Shoreham Beach, that stretches along The Pines Beach from Cliff Road to the main The Pines Beach Car Park. The pines form a continuous line acting as a boundary to the beach. Most of these date from the early twentieth century. Pine trees were a classic seaside planting to provide windbreaks and protection for habitations behind the foreshore. Many such pine plantings around Port Phillip Bay and Western Port Bay were or are being replaced. The landscape of which the pines constitute an important element, is of outstanding aesthetic significance. The Pines are a very impressive stand of trees, and are unique as the best example in Victoria of a stand of pines on a foreshore reserve.

Since the 1950s, The Pines have acted as a landmark for the surfing community who were responsible for the promotion of The Pines Beach as a surfing destination. Local and international surfing guides list The Pines as one of Australia and New Zealand’s top surfing spots and The Pines is marked on maps of surfing locations.

== See also ==
- List of places on the Victorian Heritage Register in the Shire of Mornington Peninsula
- Surfing in Australia
