= Sages Cottage =

Heritage-listed house in Melbourne, Victoria, Australia

- Location of the house in Greater Metropolitan Melbourne
- Interactive map of the Sages Cottage area
- Alternative names: Sages Cottage Farm; Eurutta

General information
- Status: Completed
- Type: Cottage
- Architectural style: Old Colonial
- Location: 85 Sages Road, Baxter, Mornington Peninsula, Melbourne, Victoria, Australia
- Coordinates: 38°11′51″S 145°08′07″E
- Completed: 1870; 156 years ago
- Client: John Sage
- Owner: Sage family (1856–1977); Victorian Conservation Trust (1977–2000s); Wallare Australia (since 2013)

Technical details
- Structural system: Slab hut
- Material: Timber; weatherboard; corrugated iron
- Grounds: 15 ha (38 acres)

Website
- sagescottage.com.au

Victorian Heritage Register
- Official name: Sages Cottage
- Type: Registered place
- Criteria: A, D
- Designated: 9 October 1974
- Reference no.: H0302
- Heritage overlay no.: HO225
- Category: Residential buildings (private)

Register of the National Estate
- Official name: Eurutta
- Type: Defunct register
- Designated: 21 March 1978
- Reference no.: 5827

Sages Cottage, also known as Sages Cottage Farm and Eurutta, is a cottage, small farm, and gardens, located at 85 Sages Road in Baxter, on the Mornington Peninsula, in the south eastern suburbs of Melbourne, in Victoria, Australia.

Located on the traditional lands of the Bunurong people, an early Colonial cottage was erected on a working farm in the 1870s that remained in the one family until 1977. Since 2013, the farm and cottage cafe have been run as a social enterprise for people living with disabilities by a Melbourne-based non-profit organisation.

The cottage and grounds were added to the Victorian Heritage Register on 9 October 1974 in recognition of its historical and architectural significance; and was also added to non-statutory lists by the Victorian branch of the National Trust on 30 August 1973 and the now defunct Register of the National Estate, listed as Eurutta, on 21 March 1978.

== History ==
One of the first European settlers in the district, Benjamin Baxter, settled in the Mornington Peninsula in c. 1842 on his 6,100-hectare (15,000-acre) pastoral run, Carrup Carrup. Baxter's daughter married John Edward Sage in 1852, and the Sage acquired a 15-hectare (38-acre) portion of Baxter's land in 1856, and managed both this property, called Eurutta, and Baxter's property. Sage leased two adjoining properties to the north in 1871 and 1877, and built his homestead, now known as Sages Cottage, on Eurutta, from 1871. The Sage family worked the farm until 1977.

From the 1970s to the 1990s, Sages Cottage operated as a restaurant and tourist facility. Wallara Australia, a disability service provider based in the eastern Melbourne suburb of Keysborough, acquired Sages Cottage in 2013 and commenced providing its clients with a broad range of experiences at Sages Farm including animal care and farm education, aquaponics, beekeeping, bushland and ecology, cooking, garden care, holistic health, horticulture, hospitality, landscaping and construction, lawn mowing, and more.

== Description ==
The heritage curtail of Sages Cottage includes the homestead building, stables, blacksmith's shop, outdoor toilet, the form of the original orchard, and remnant trees and hedges.

The homestead was completed in the Old Colonial style and is a rare surviving example of vernacular construction techniques, in this case vertical slabs. The cottage is typical and exemplary of early homesteads in Victoria. Part of the cottage is constructed in sawn vertical slabs and part is weatherboard, with hipped roofs, clad in corrugated iron. A timber verandah is supported on plain bevelled posts. The facade is symmetrical. Acquired by the Victorian Conservation Trust from the Sage family in 1977, the building was used as a restaurant and tourist facility before being purchased by Menzies Inc., an organisation dedicated to caring for disadvantaged youth.

The former stables on the farm site have been transformed into a rustic event venue, popular for weddings.

== See also ==
- Architecture of Melbourne
- List of places on the Victorian Heritage Register in the Shire of Mornington Peninsula

== Additional reading ==
- Allom Lovell and Associates (2005). Sages Cottage, Baxter: Conservation Management Plan (Report). Melbourne.
