= City of Frankston (former) =

Coordinates: 38°09′S 145°08′E

City of Frankston Victoria
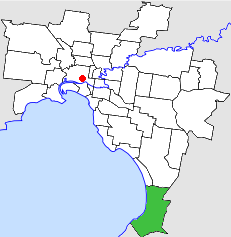
- Location in Melbourne
- The extent of the City of Frankston at its dissolution in 1994
- Population: 89,600 (1992)
  - Density: 1,262.7/km^{2} (3,270.3/sq mi)
- Established: 1860
- Abolished: 1994
- Area: 70.96 km^{2} (27.4 sq mi)
- Council seat: Frankston
- Region: Southeast Melbourne
- County: Mornington
LGAs around City of Frankston:
Chelsea	Springvale	Cranbourne
Port Phillip	City of Frankston	Cranbourne
Mornington	Hastings	Hastings

The City of Frankston (known before 1966 as the Shire of Frankston) was a local government area about 40 kilometres (25 mi) south of Melbourne, the state capital of Victoria, Australia. The city covered an area of 70.96 square kilometres (27.4 sq mi) in and around Frankston, and existed from 1860 until 1994.

== History ==
The City of Frankston had its origins in the Mount Eliza Road District, which was created on 6 November 1860, and redesignated as a shire and renamed Mornington on 24 November 1871.

The West riding of Mornington Shire was excised to create the New Mornington Shire on 30 May 1893 (and was itself renamed Mornington Shire on 15 January 1894), and the remaining East and North ridings were renamed Frankston & Hastings Shire on 20 October 1893. The two shires were almost reunited in a major local government reform programme in 1915.

On 19 October 1960, the Central and Eastern Ridings of Frankston & Hastings Shire were severed, and with parts of the Eastern Riding of the Shire of Flinders, were incorporated as the Shire of Hastings. The remainder was renamed the Shire of Frankston.

After a petition was received by the Government on 4 May 1966, Frankston Shire was proclaimed as a city on 24 August 1966.

On 15 December 1994, the City of Frankston was abolished, and along with parts of the Cities of Cranbourne and Springvale, was merged into the new City of Frankston. Parts of Mount Eliza were transferred to the newly created Shire of Mornington Peninsula.

Some changes occurred between the release of the Local Government Board report in July 1994 and the actual amalgamation; the original plan was to merge Frankston with the City of Chelsea, and take Braeside and Carrum Downs from the City of Springvale. However, Frankston City Council submitted that it should expand eastwards instead, as well as taking Mount Eliza and Baxter. By October, the present boundaries had been agreed upon, but the new entity was to be known as the City of Nepean. This appeared in the Board's final report in November 1994. However, the State Government ultimately decided to use the old name for the new entity, departing from the Board's recommendation.

Council formerly met at the Civic Centre at Young Street and Davey Street, Frankston. The facility is still used for the same purpose by the new City of Frankston.

== Wards ==
The City of Frankston was divided into four wards, each of which elected three councillors:

- North Ward
- East Ward
- Centre Ward
- South Ward

== Suburbs ==
- Baxter (shared with the City of Cranbourne and the Shire of Hastings)
- Carrum Downs (shared with the City of Springvale and City of Cranbourne)
- Frankston*
- Frankston North
- Frankston South
- Mount Eliza (shared with the Shire of Mornington)
- Seaford
- Pearcedale (shared with City of Cranbourne and Shire of Hastings)

* Council seat.

== Population ==
Year	Population
1954	15,478
1958	20,600*
1961	26,722
1966	42,042
1971	59,410
1976	71,899
1981	78,808
1986	83,819
1991	84,986

* Estimate in the 1958 Victorian Year Book.
