= Shire of Mornington (Victoria) =

Coordinates: 38°13′S 145°03′E

Shire of Mornington Victoria
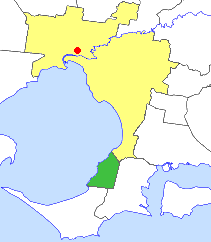
- Location in Melbourne
- The extent of the Shire of Mornington at its dissolution in 1994
- Population: 32,800 (1992)
  - Density: 361.8/km^{2} (937.1/sq mi)
- Established: 1893
- Area: 90.65 km^{2} (35.0 sq mi)
- Council seat: Mornington
- Region: Mornington Peninsula
- County: Mornington
LGAs around Shire of Mornington:
Port Phillip	Port Phillip	Frankston
Port Phillip	Shire of Mornington	Hastings
Flinders	Flinders	Hastings

The Shire of Mornington was a local government area about 50 kilometres (30 mi) south of Melbourne, the state capital of Victoria, Australia, encompassing the western extremity of the Mornington Peninsula. The shire covered an area of 90.65 square kilometres (35.0 sq mi) immediately to the south of Frankston, and existed from 1860 until 1994.

== History ==
The Mount Eliza Road District (centred on Frankston) was created on 6 November 1860, and became a shire on 24 November 1871. On 31 May 1893, it was renamed the Shire of Frankston and Hastings, while its western riding was severed and named New Mornington, to avoid confusion with the previous entity. On 19 January 1894, it was renamed the Shire of Mornington.

On 15 December 1994, the Shire of Mornington was abolished, and along with the Shires of Shire of Flinders and Hastings, and parts of the City of Frankston, was merged into the newly created Shire of Mornington Peninsula. The Age reported in July 1994 that the result had been supported by Hastings and Mornington councils from the beginning, but opposed by Flinders, which wanted to merge with the southern coastal section of Hastings.

Council formerly met at the Shire Hall, at Queen Street and Vancouver Street, Mornington. The facility is used today as a civic centre and library by the Shire of Mornington Peninsula.

== Wards ==
The Shire of Mornington was divided into four ridings, each of which elected three councillors:

- Mornington North Riding
- Mornington South Riding
- Mount Eliza Riding
- Mount Martha Riding

== Suburbs and localities ==
- Moorooduc (shared with the Shire of Hastings)
- Mornington*
- Mount Eliza (shared with the City of Frankston)
- Mount Martha

* Council seat.

== Population ==
Year	Population
1954	5,793
1958	7,540*
1961	7,819
1966	10,214
1971	14,289
1976	20,206
1981	23,512
1986	27,397
1991	29,958

* Estimate in the 1958 Victorian Year Book.
