= Shire of Flinders (Victoria) =

Coordinates: 38°26′S 145°00′E

Shire of Flinders Victoria
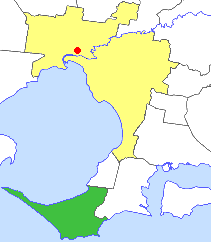
- Location in Melbourne
- The Shire of Flinders as at its dissolution in 1994
- Population: 40,000 (1992)
  - Density: 123/km^{2} (320/sq mi)
- Established: 1858
- Area: 324 km^{2} (125.1 sq mi)
- Council seat: Rosebud
- Region: Mornington Peninsula
- County: Mornington
LGAs around Shire of Flinders:
Port Phillip	Mornington	Mornington
Port Phillip	Shire of Flinders	Hastings
Bass Strait	Western Port	Western Port

The Shire of Flinders was a local government area encompassing the extremity of the Mornington Peninsula, about 65 kilometres (40 mi) south of Melbourne, the state capital of Victoria, Australia. The shire covered an area of 324 square kilometres (125.1 sq mi), and existed from 1874 until 1994.

== History ==
The Kangerong Road District (adjoining Port Phillip) was created on 14 October 1862. The Flinders Road District, on the east of the peninsula, was created on 15 December 1868. They united to become the Shire of Flinders and Kangerong on 24 December 1874, which was renamed Flinders on 28 January 1914. On 19 October 1960, part of the Eastern Riding was transferred to the new Shire of Hastings, which had split from the Shire of Frankston.

On 15 December 1994, the Shire of Flinders was abolished, and along with the Shires of Hastings and Mornington, and parts of the City of Frankston, was merged into the newly created Shire of Mornington Peninsula. The Age reported in July 1994 that the result had been supported by Hastings and Mornington councils from the beginning, but opposed by Flinders, which wanted to merge with the southern coastal section of Hastings.

Council formerly met at the Shire Offices, on Boneo Road, Rosebud. The facility is still used today by the Shire of Mornington Peninsula.

== Wards ==
The Shire of Flinders was divided into four ridings in May 1961, each of which elected three councillors:

- Matthew Riding
- Murray Riding
- Bowen Riding
- Collins Riding

== Suburbs and localities ==
- Arthurs Seat
- Boneo
- Dromana
- Blairgowrie
- Cape Schanck
- Fingal
- Flinders
- Main Ridge
- McCrae
- Point Nepean
- Portsea*
- Red Hill
- Rosebud
- Rosebud South
- Rosebud West
- Rye
- Safety Beach
- Shoreham (shared with the Shire of Hastings)
- Sorrento
- St Andrews Beach
- Tootgarook

* Council seat.

== Population ==
Year	Population
1954	12,072
1958	17,200*
1961	10,512+
1966	12,464
1971	15,481
1976	21,323
1981	25,300
1986	33,065
1991	36,516

* Estimate in the 1958 Victorian Year Book.
+ Drop in population due to loss of part of eastern riding to the new Shire of Hastings in 1960.
