= Main Ridge, Victoria =

Main Ridge
- Town
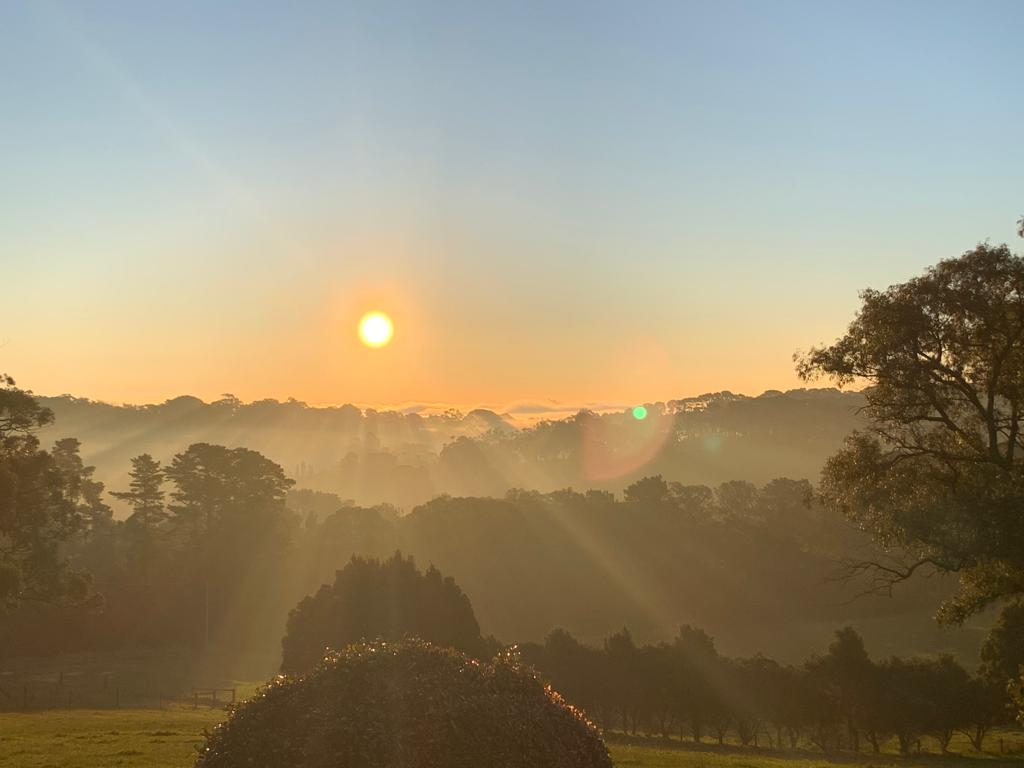
- Sunset in Main Ridge

- Interactive map of Main Ridge
- Coordinates: 38.402°S 144.972°E
- Country: Australia
- State: Victoria
- LGA: Shire of Mornington Peninsula
- Location: 97 km (60 mi) from Melbourne; 9 km (5.6 mi) from Rosebud

Government
  - State electorate: Nepean
  - Federal division: Flinders

Population
  - Total: 416 (2021 census)
- Postcode: 3928
Localities around Main Ridge
McCrae	Arthurs Seat	Red Hill
Rosebud	Main Ridge	Red Hill
Boneo	Flinders	Red Hill

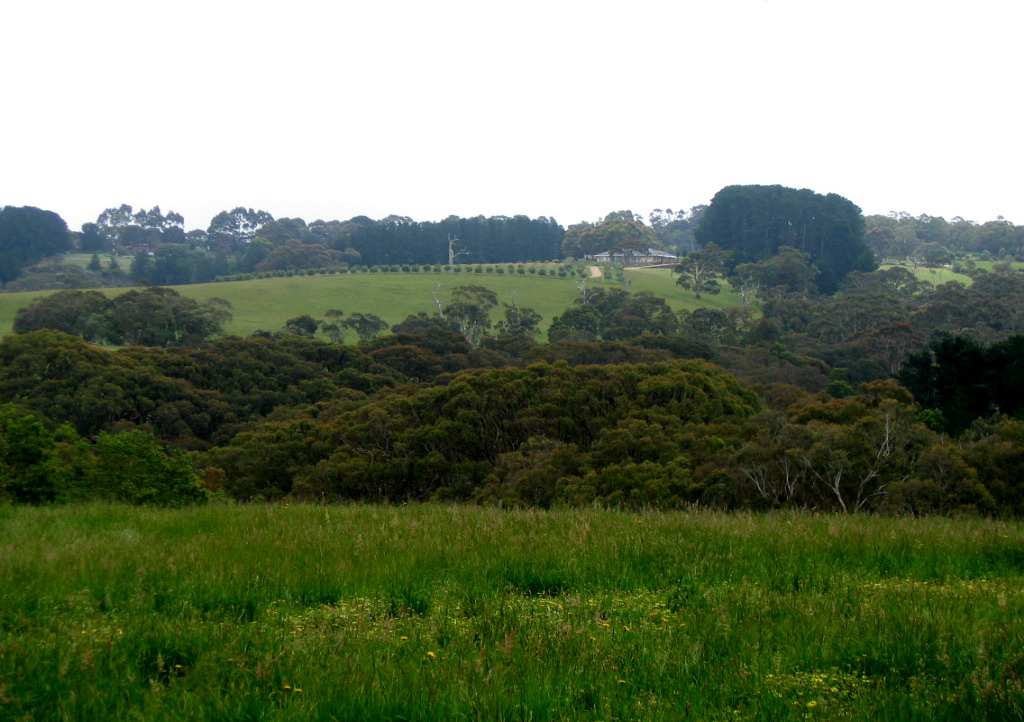
Main Ridge

Main Ridge is a locality on the Mornington Peninsula in Melbourne, Victoria, Australia, approximately 65 km (40 mi) south of Melbourne's Central Business District, located within the Shire of Mornington Peninsula local government area. Main Ridge recorded a population of 453 at the 2021 census.

South of and inland from Rosebud and originally known as Main Creek, the district consists of the western spine of Arthurs Seat and the southern hinterlands. A R & F Ditterich Reserve, containing a hall, picnic and sports facilities, and the nearby CFA are the main facilities in the district, while several wineries such as Poplar Bend and Ryland River are located here.

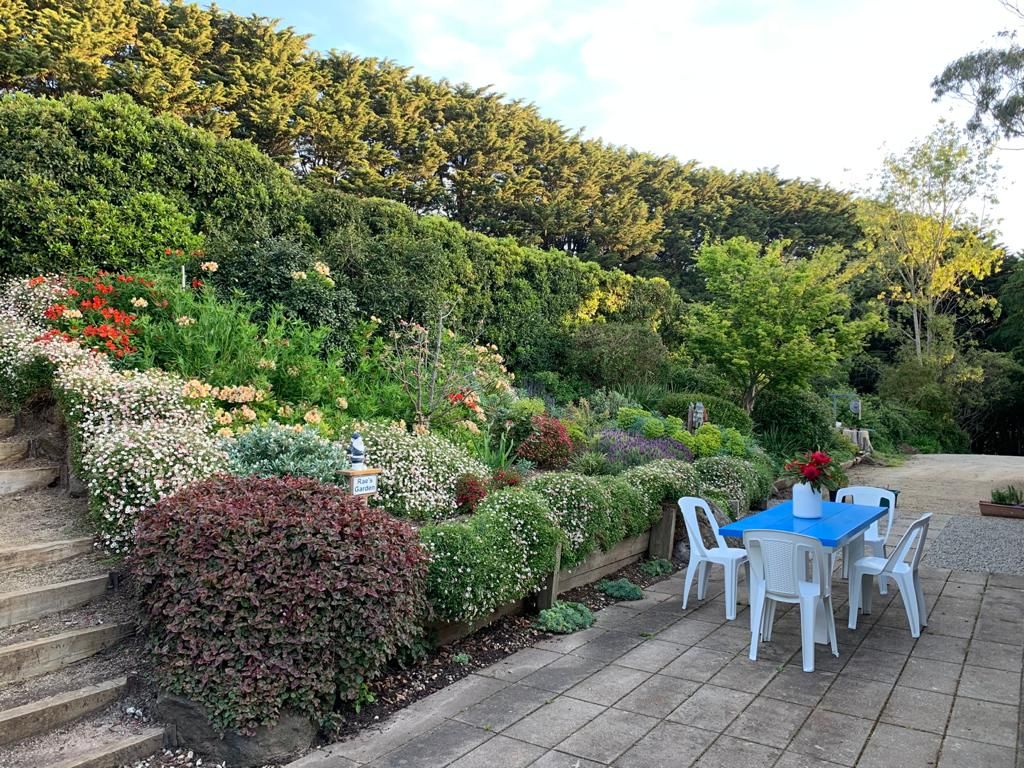
Gardens of Main Ridge

The southern part of the locality, alongside Main Creek, is part of the Mornington Peninsula National Park called Greens Bush, a native bushland area first set aside for conservation in 1974 and supporting the largest population of eastern grey kangaroos on the Mornington Peninsula. Several walking tracks provide access to the area.

== See also ==
- Shire of Flinders – Main Ridge was previously within this former local government area.
