= Rosebud, Victoria =

Rosebud
- Suburb
- Rosebud Pier

- Interactive map of Rosebud
- Coordinates: 38.356°S 144.918°E
- Country: Australia
- State: Victoria
- City: Melbourne
- LGA: Shire of Mornington Peninsula
- Location: 81 km (50 mi) from Melbourne; 35 km (22 mi) from Frankston; 20 km (12 mi) from Mornington

Government
  - State electorate: Nepean
  - Federal division: Flinders

Area
  - Total: 11.9 km^{2} (4.6 sq mi)

Population
  - Total: 14,381 (2021 census)
  - Density: 1,208/km^{2} (3,130/sq mi)
- Postcode: 3939
Suburbs around Rosebud
Port Phillip		McCrae
Rosebud West	Rosebud	Arthurs Seat, Victoria
	Boneo	Main Ridge

Rosebud is a seaside suburb on the Mornington Peninsula in Melbourne, Victoria, Australia, approximately 61 km (38 mi) south of Melbourne's Central Business District, located within the Shire of Mornington Peninsula local government area. Rosebud recorded a population of 14,381 at the 2021 census.

Rosebud is wedged between the lower slopes of Arthurs Seat, the shores of Port Phillip and the plains of Boneo. It is a popular tourist resort with families who appreciate its sandy beaches and shallow waters.

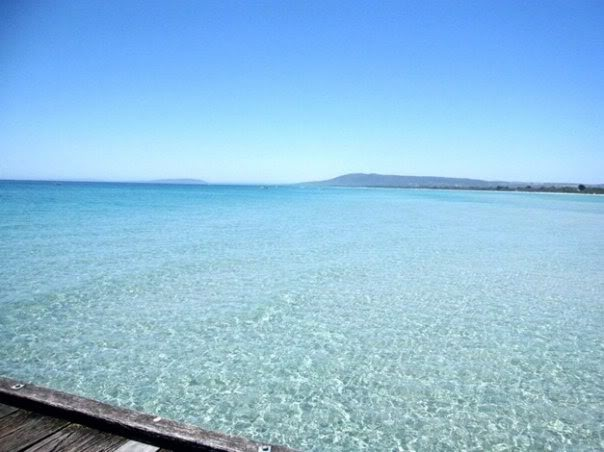
Shallow waters on the Peninsula

== History ==
On 2 June 1855, the cargo vessel Rosebud, owned by one of the colony's best known pastoralists Edward Hobson, was washed over the large sandbars and onto the beach. The burgeoning community made off with the cargo of damask and household goods, but the wreck remained for many years as the locals slowly stripped its hull to use in the construction of houses. It became commonplace to call the area "The Rosebud" in reference to the ship, which was shortened to "Rosebud" as the last vestiges of the ship disappeared.

Officially, the term Rosebud, referred only to Rosebud Village, related to the blocks on the foreshore west of Eeling Creek, an underground drain between Tom Salt Park and the camping ground. Land on the south side of "the road to Portsea" was described as being in Wannaeue; the name of the parish that extended south to Limestone Road. In more recent times, the name is recalled by a small street between Rosebud Parade and Ninth Avenue. The parish went from The Avenue to Government Road in Rye, and also included the Arthurs Seat pre-emptive right (now McCrae and Arthurs Seat). Peter Wilson gives much detail about the buyers of Rosebud Village allotments. Lime Land Leisure mentions a "Mr Gomm, of whom little is known."

Allotment 20, between The Avenue and Parkmore Road, was not settled at the same time as the rest of the land to Boneo Road. This allotment was supposedly due to an arrangement with Captain Henry Everest Adams, who was carrying convicts between Van Diemen's Land and Melbourne. The transport was probably provided in 1840 when there was a drastic labour shortage in Melbourne. Isaac White, who purchased allotment 19 (west to Adams Avenue), knew Adams and probably cared for the Captain's wife while he was away at sea. He probably settled lot 19 on behalf of the Captain, who owned it by 1864. In The Argus of 12 March 1883, the Government advertised land in the village of Wannaeue on allotment 20, Wannaeue. No parish map made mention of the village. The Adams family had a guest house, Hopetoun House, named after the Governor (a frequent guest), on the site of the car wash near McCrae Plaza. It was later renamed Merlyn Lodge. Robert Adams sold allotment 19 and the part north of Rosemore Road was subdivided but the ownership of the rest reverted to him in the Bust. Parkmore was built in 1896 by Albert Holloway and bought by the Clemengers in 1908.

The rest of the land to Boneo Road was granted to speculators. Allotment 18 (west to Jetty Road) became the property of Charles Blakey and then Robert White, after 18 February 1874, when the 62-hectare (152.5-acre) allotment was advertised in The Argus. It was pointed out that a block, 20 by 101 metres (66 by 330 ft), that fronted the beach road, was sold. As this was the only block separately owned for decades, it had to be Lot 86, which William Edwards mortgaged to Captain Adams in August 1878. Edwards borrowed £128 9/-, to be repaid with interest, on 30 June 1880. McCrae was called Dromana until about 70 years ago, as the steamers had made Dromana's location well known. Isobel Moresby said that Jack Jones had built a store on the corner in c. 1900, but it was built about a decade earlier, just after the Lake v Jones case.

Allotment 17 (west to Norm Clark Walk, came into the ownership of the Woolcotts. William Gomm was farming it in 1876 and returned to fishing when subdivision began. George and Susan Peatey were among the first buyers and the site for the state school was bought a few years later. Later residents were the McDowells after whom a street was named.

Allotments 16 and 15 (west to First Avenue) became the Clacton on-Sea estate. Allotment 14 (west to Boneo Road), granted to Hugh Glass of Flemington House, became small farms: Randall's, then Rigg's Hindhope, and Coupar's The Thicket. By 1930 Hindhope Park was operating on the site of Rosebud Plaza. This had pine cabins for tourist accommodation. Some of the land was subdivided as the Hindhope Estate by 1920, but the tourist facility was still running in the mid-1960s. Walter and Charlie Burnham, fishermen from Sorrento, were two early purchasers on the estate in about 1914. (See Steve Burnam's website for Vin Burnham's story of the early days.)

Peter Wilson's book, "On the Road to Rosebud", gave an excellent detail about Lot 18 (Henry Potton's Farm, the suicide), Lot 17 (church, shops) and the Clacton-on-Sea estate.

The settlement remained rudimentary for many years. A school began operating in 1884 and moved into purpose-built premises three years later. The first store wasn't opened until Welshman Jackie Jones began selling goods from an upturned boat in the late 1880s. Rosebud suffered from a lack of direct access to Melbourne. When a pier was finally built in 1888, it failed to extend into the deep water, so ferries and passenger ships from the metropolis had to dock at Dromana, approximately eight kilometres (five miles) to the north. A road was formed by clearing a path at Anthony's Nose, the point where Arthurs Seat meets the sea, halfway between Rosebud and Dromana. This, at last, gave Rosebud a road connection to surrounding towns and Melbourne. The Post Office opened on 27 March 1889.

Although some companies offered ferry passengers a ride to Rosebud after they disembarked at Dromana, the bulk of the tourism trade went to Dromana and nearby Arthurs Seat, while Dromana remained the transportation hub for goods brought by road and sea.

In the early twentieth century, developers attempted to market Rosebud as an English-style seaside resort with the creation of the Clacton-on-Sea estate (today known as the "Avenues"). Vacant land was offered at just £2 per block in an effort to stimulate investment in the area. Take up was slow; society was not affluent enough to allow many of the middle class to own holiday homes so far from the city. This slow growth continued in the inter-war years; the township consisted of approximately ten shops and a Presbyterian church, built of wood on a single day in 1923. The first pub, the Rosebud Hotel, was built in 1939-40 in the prevailing Art Deco style, and it remains the only pub in the town to this day.

Local businessmen had noticed a slowly growing phenomenon in the late 1930s and 1940s – the popularity of camping on the Rosebud foreshore; a cheap and interesting alternative to staying at guesthouses or hotels. After World War II, aided by the explosion in the number of people owning a car, camping at Rosebud over the Christmas-New Year holidays became a tradition for many Melbourne and Victorian families. The Rosebud Foreshore Committee was set up to administer the area and take bookings, which are now made twelve months in advance. In the 21st century, camping on the foreshore has taken on a cultural dimension and there are families who are fourth and even fifth generation visitors. Many Victorians reminisce about summer holidays at Rosebud.

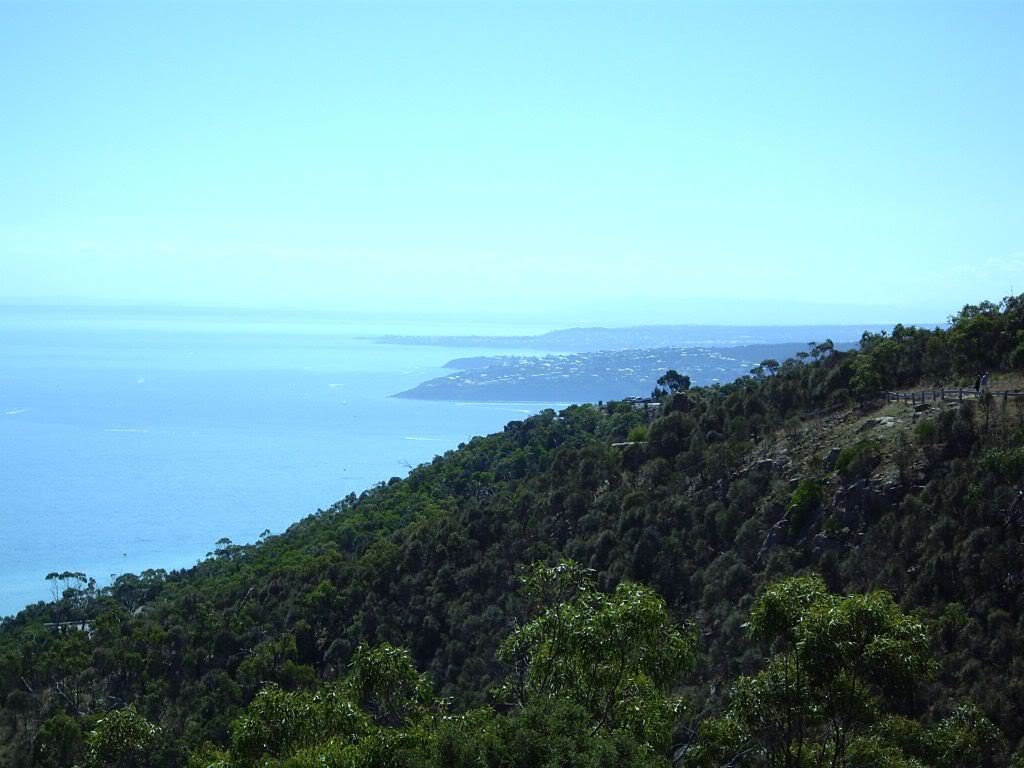
Seawinds National Park, near Arthurs Seat

By the 1960s, Rosebud was the largest town on the southern Peninsula, complete with a shopping centre and extensive sporting facilities. In time it became home to an increasing number of permanent residents, including 'sea change' retirees. New housing estates have developed in the last five years, including the Peninsula Sands Estate in Rosebud South, home to many young families.

=== Heritage listings ===
The following place in Rosebud is listed on the Victorian Heritage Register:

- Rosebud Sound Shell, 988 Point Nepean Road

== Culture ==
Rosebud is popular for its weekend markets, including craft and vintage markets.

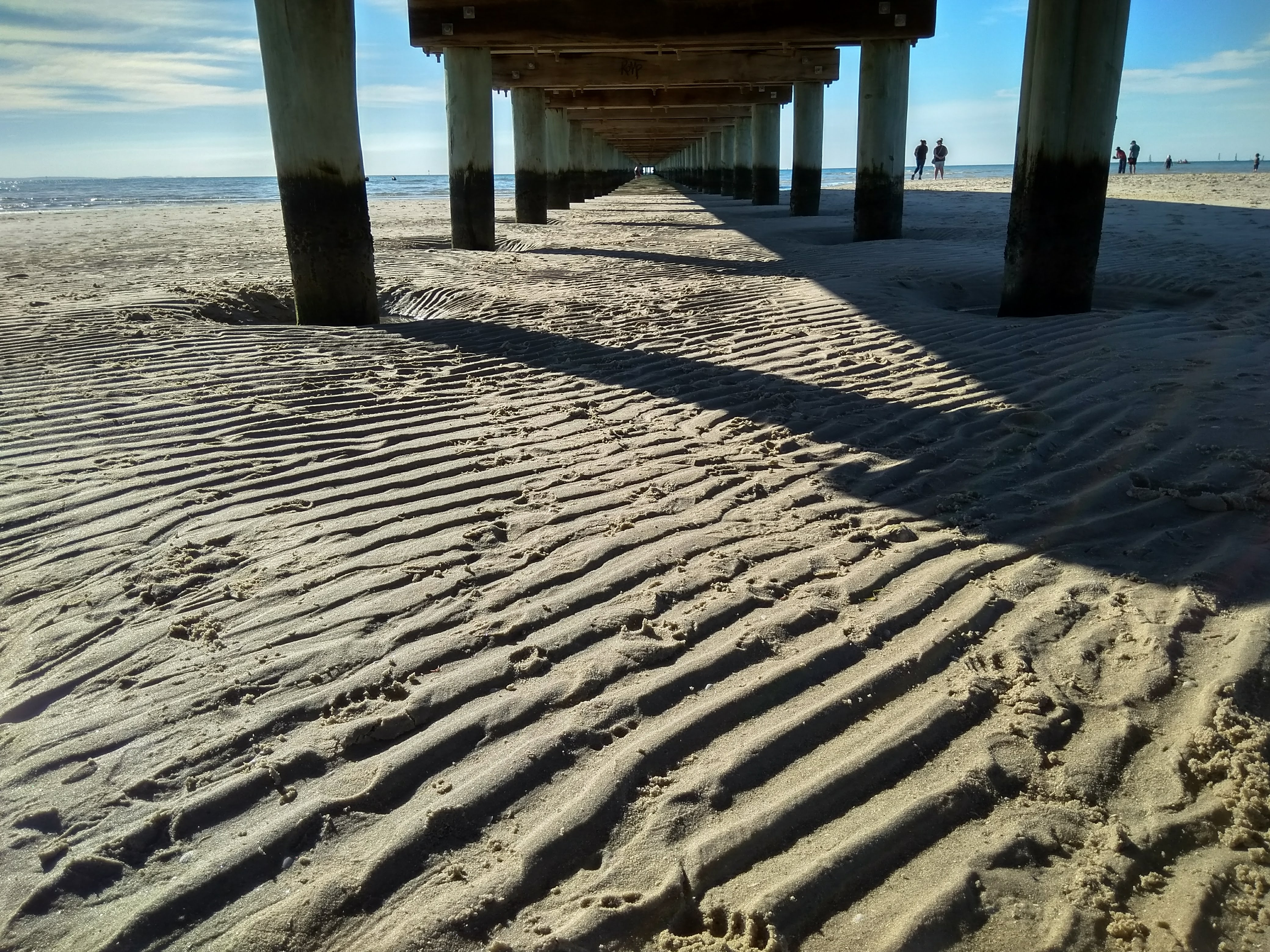
Rosebud Pier at low tide 2018

The foreshore area of Rosebud is one of the largest camping areas on the peninsula. During the summer months the populations of Rosebud and Dromana can double in size as many tourists stay within the camp grounds.

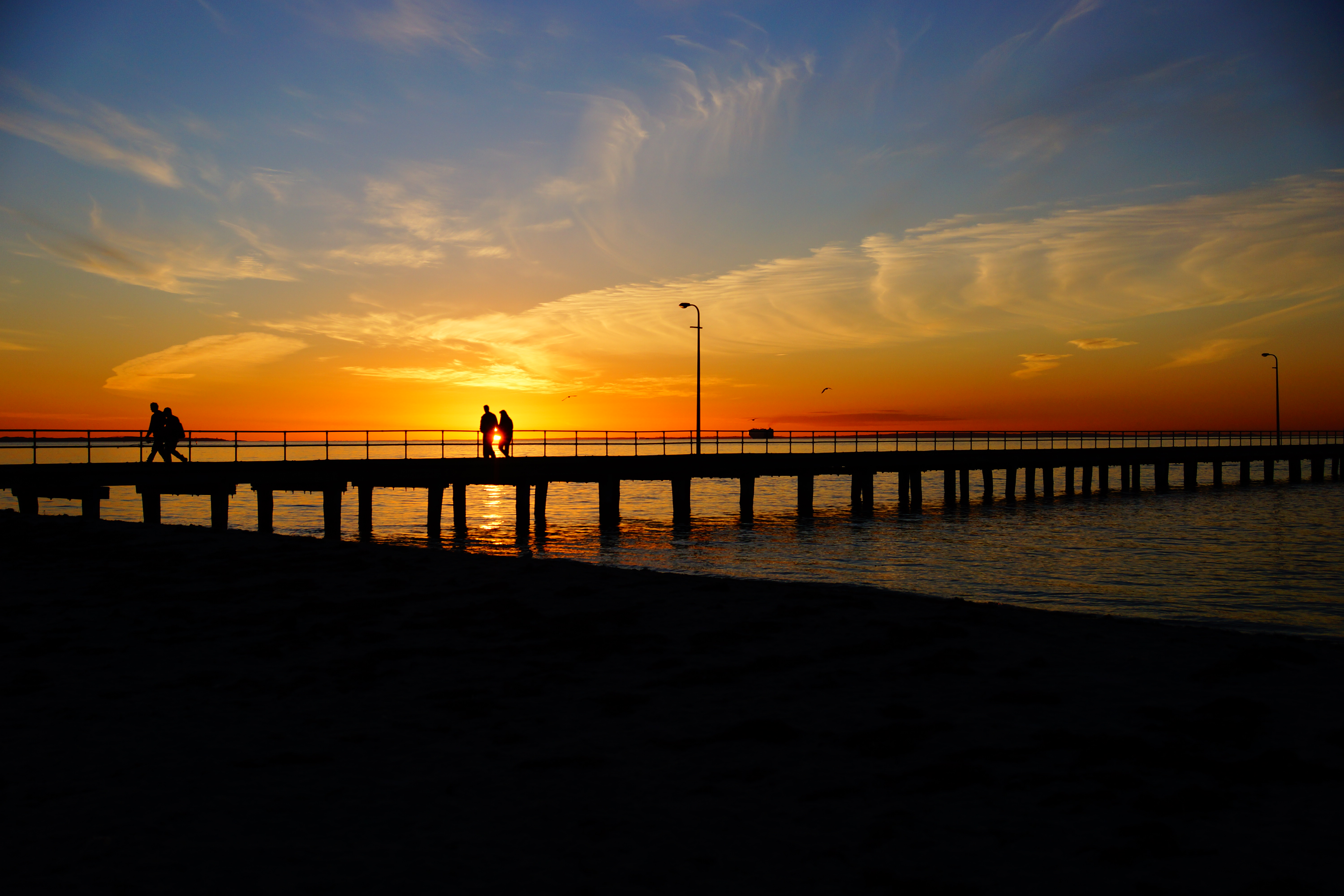
Rosebud Pier at sunset 2015

In 2015, Mornington Peninsula Shire completed the complete rebuild of Rosebud's famous pier with Parks Victoria having spent about $3.5 million on its restoration.

Rosebud has hosted a parkrun on the foreshore since 17 February 2018.

In 2015 SJ Higgings was awarded the project to develop a low-rise apartment and retail units on the corner of Jetty and Nepean Roads.

== Climate ==
Rosebud has a temperate coastal climate, and is usually several degrees cooler than Melbourne. The annual maximum mean temperature is 19.1 °C.

== Topography ==
The town centre is located directly opposite the foreshore area and local beach.

Rosebud is shielded by camping grounds lined with banksias, tea tree and sheoak. During the summer months and as late as Easter campers can be found in these areas. Rosebud is one of the main towns on the Mornington Peninsula mostly because of its shopping areas. The Public Library is located at the Rosebud Central Shopping Centre. There is a shopping strip in Capel Sound, along Point Nepean Road.

The town's shopping strip and most of its amenities are located on an extended strip of the Nepean Highway, which runs parallel to the beach. Rosebud proper extends from Lonsdale Street (the border with McCrae) for three kilometres to Boneo Road, where Rosebud West (Capel Sound) begins, while Rosebud South is a pocket of suburban streets directly south of Rosebud on the lower slopes of Arthur's Seat. In 2016, after a controversial, and at times bitter balloting process, Mornington Peninsula Shire approved the name "Capel Sound" to replace "Rosebud West". This was done to align with the Federal Government's preference for town names without directional reference. It was also seen as an opportunity to improve the image of a suburb previously viewed as being somewhat less socially acceptable to the wider community. Some residents fancied the old name had a negative effect on land and property values. Other residents had grown up in Rosebud West. They expressed dismay and annoyance that their town's traditional name might be taken from them. Nevertheless, after a long and at times painful campaign, the name "Capel Sound", taken from a small bay area to the north of the shopping village, was the one which emerged to grace the town's signboards for ever more.

== Sport ==
The town has an Australian Rules football team competing in the Mornington Peninsula Nepean Football League. They play at Olympic Park on Eastbourne Road. They have been champion of this league six times; in 1933, 1970, 1988, 1997, 2007 and 2015.

Rosebud is home to the Rosebud Heart Soccer Club which was established in 2010. The club has 180 junior players with 12 teams playing in the Football Victoria leagues and their own mini league Soccer Champs Program and a girls team that started in 2020. The club's home ground is Olympic Park Recreation Reserve located on Besgrove Street.

Golfers play at the Eagle Ridge Golf Course on Browns Road, Rosebud, at the course of the Rosebud Country Club on Boneo Road, or at the Rosebud Park Public Golf Course on Elizabeth Drive.

Cycling is also a popular pastime in Rosebud and on the Mornington Peninsula. Point Nepean Road and the Nepean Highway are used by cyclists, as well as shared trails. The Mornington Peninsula Shire has constructed almost 80 kilometres of trails, including Bay Trail: Dromana to Sorrento, Melbourne Road Trail: Rye to Portsea and Western Port Bay Trail: Somerville to Balnarring.

== Schools ==
There are several schools in the Rosebud area.

Primary schools include:

- Rosebud Primary School, established 1884
- Eastbourne Primary School
- Our Lady of Fatima – A Catholic school

Secondary colleges include:

- Rosebud Secondary College
- Rosebud Padua College

== Other facilities ==
Rosebud Hospital, part of Peninsula Health is located on Point Nepean Road, to the West of Rosebud's main business district. It is supported by a recently constructed ambulance station houses with 2 Paramedic Ambulance units, while another station on the Eastern side of the town, houses a Mobile Intensive Care Ambulance (MICA) unit.

Within the quadrangle Boneo Road, Eastbourne Road, Hinton Street and Besgrove Street are many of Rosebud's utility, community and emergency services infrastructures. Rosebud's fire and police services are located on Boneo Road, with Rosebud's fire services being staffed by Career and Volunteer firefighters. To the rear of the fire and police station is the Mornington Peninsula Shire's Rosebud offices. Whilst along Hinton Street is the district's headquarters and operations depot for Parks Victoria. North of Besgrove Street, beside the Fire station, are the Mornington Peninsula Woodworkers and the Southern Peninsula Amateur Radio Club (SPARC).

An expanding industrial precinct is located off Boneo Road, approximately 3 kilometres south of the town centre.

Further along Boneo Road, the Chisholm Institute of TAFE. Notable amongst these are specialist facilities for training apprentice chefs and a purpose built facility for students engaged in learning care and maintenance of golf courses and greens.

== Notable residents ==
- Arthur Boyd, artist and the 1995 Australian of the Year, launched his career as a painter at age 16 while living in Rosebud from 1936–39 with his grandfather. One of his paintings was of the Burnhams' jetty at the end of Boneo Rd; it is reproduced in Peter Wilson's On the Road to Rosebud alongside photos of the jetty. The Boyd cottage was at 62 Rosebud Pde, and may still be standing.
- Judith Durham, singer who spent her first six summers in the weatherboard house that stood on the west side of Durham Place
- William John Ferrier, who won acclaim for his heroic rescue of two of the seven crewmen of the La Bella at Warrnambool. He owned 858 Pt Nepean Rd for a time before moving to Queenscliff, naming his house in Beach St "Rosebud". A descendant, Lewis Ferrier, jokingly called the Harbour Master at Queenscliff, gave the same name to his fishing boat. The Queenscliffe Maritime Museum website shows some paintings of ships that Ferrier did on the internal timber lining of the South Pile Lighthouse. Two farm homesteads remain among subdivision housing in Rosebud: 19 Mitchell St and 50 First Avenue. The latter was the Hindhope Villa on lots 95 and 96 of the Hindhope Estate (with 14 acres of grounds, as advertised in the Argus in 1914, which the land plan shows was west of Rosebrook St.)

== See also ==
- Shire of Flinders – Rosebud was previously within this former local government area.
