= A. A. Watts =

A. A. Watts may refer to:

- Alaric Alexander Watts (1797–1864), British poet and journalist
- Alaric Alfred Watts (1825–1901), British clerk and spiritualist
- Alf Watts (1862–1928), British socialist

== See also ==
- Watts (surname)
