= The Literary Magnet =

1820s British magazine

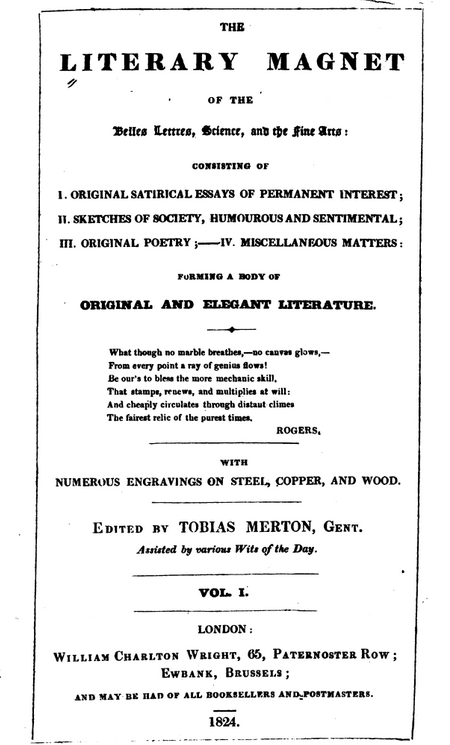
Title page of the first volume (1824)

The Literary Magnet was a British magazine. Started as a weekly magazine in 1824 by Egerton Brydges and his son using the pseudonym Tobias Merton, it became a monthly magazine towards the end of 1824. The Magnet went through a number of editors, and was bought first by Alaric Alexander Watts in late 1825, and then William Charlton Wright in 1828. Its primary emphasis shifted from prose to poetry under Watts, who managed to get contributions from several notable poets of the day.

== History ==
The Literary Magnet was started as a weekly magazine in 1824 with the full title The Literary Magnet of the Belles Lettres, Science, and the Fine Arts, by co-editors Samuel Egerton Brydges and his son Egerton Anthony Brydges under the joint pseudonym Tobias Merton (perhaps an anagram of their names). (Note: Professor Ted Ellis suggests that "Tobias Merton, Gent." (as printed on the magazine title page) is an anagram formed from "SAM EGERTON TONI(Y) B[RYDGES], T[RINITY]".) Its first series was published by William Charlton Wright, and ran until June 1824. Egerton Anthony Brydges seems to have stopped editing the magazine near the start of volume two, with no evidence of any contributions from him after the second issue, and his father's contributions seem only to have continued until the eighth issue. An unknown editor using the initials "J. H. H." effectively took over from issue nine. Towards the end of the second series, after the fiftieth sixteen-page weekly issue of the magazine, it was turned into a monthly magazine. The third volume, published 1825, changed publishers to George Wightman, and started to include colour plates. Part way through this volume, the magazine was divided into two parts: "The Literary Magnet" and "The Monthly Journal". A fourth volume, dated 1825, completed the magazine's first series. The editorship changed at least once more to another unknown figure before the end of the first series, though the pen-name Tobias Merton was kept throughout this series as the nominal editor, and as a character in its "Round Table" columns.

Alaric Alexander Watts bought The Literary Magnet by December 1825, and made an unnamed "very clever young literary friend" the editor of the first volume of its second series, which ran from January to June 1826. This was published by Charles Knight, with the full title changed to The Literary Magnet, or Monthly Journal of the Belles Lettres. Watts became the anonymous editor for volumes two (July to December 1826), three (January to June 1827), and four (July to December 1827). A final fifth volume was published and edited by the original publisher William Charlton Wright under the title Wright's Literary Magnet. It consisted of just three monthly issues (January to March 1828), which were described by Professor Ted Ellis as "poorly written".

== Content ==
The Literary Magnet's first series title page set out its aims, to publish "1. original satirical essays of permanent interest; 2. sketches of society, humorous and sentimental; 3. original poetry; 4. miscellaneous matters; forming a body of original and elegant literature", with the first issue describing a focus on "essays, fictions, sketches of character" and book reviews "with copious extracts". Its essays, sketches, poetry and engravings were often comic. Under "J. H. H.", a humorous "Round Table" column was introduced, purporting to be a record of meetings of the magazine's inner circle, modeled after Blackwood's Magazine's "Noctae Ambrosianae". This continued occasionally in volumes two and three of the first series. While the first series gave priority to prose, the second series concentrated much more on poetry. The first four volumes of the second series added a "Chit-Chat" column, which may have contributed to Watts' reputation as a gossip.

Among its contributors were Letitia Elizabeth Landon, Arthur Ashpitel, and Edward George Ballard. For the first four volumes of the second series (1826–1827), Watts managed to get contributions from a number of poets at the height of their popularity, including John Clare, Thomas Hood, Felicia Hemans, Mary and William Howitt, Mary Russell Mitford, William Lisle Bowles, Maria Jane Jewsbury, Margaret Hodson, Derwent Conway, Jeremiah Holmes Wiffen, Margaret Cornwell Baron Wilson, and Cornelius Webbe. Others include Samuel Taylor Coleridge, Mary Rolls, and Mary Ann Browne, though bibliographer George Clement Boase notes that from the way the second series was published it is not clear whether some of the contributions are original or just reprints.
