= Gypsy King =

Gypsy King may also refer to:

- King of the Gypsies, an informal title
- Gipsy King, a 2015 Spanish film
- Tyson Fury (born 1988), also known as the "Gypsy King", English boxer
- The Gypsy King: And Other Poems, an 1840 book by Richard Howitt
- Maruti Suzuki Gypsy, also known as Maruti Suzuki Gypsy King, a car model
- de Havilland Gipsy Twelve, also known as the de Havilland Gipsy King, an aircraft engine

== See also ==
- Gypsy Kings (disambiguation)
- King of the Gypsies (film), a 1978 American film
