= Mulgrave =

Mulgrave may refer to:

== Australia ==
=== New South Wales ===
- Mulgrave, New South Wales, a suburb of Sydney

=== Queensland ===
- Mulgrave, Queensland, a locality in the Shire of Burdekin
- Mulgrave, a former name of Gordonvale, Queensland
- Mulgrave Island, alternative name for Badu Island
- Electoral district of Mulgrave (Queensland)

=== Victoria ===
- Mulgrave, Victoria, a suburb of Melbourne
- Electoral district of Mulgrave (Victoria)

== Canada ==
- Mulgrave, Nova Scotia, a town
- Mulgrave School, in West Vancouver, British Columbia

== England ==
- Mulgrave Castle, Whitby, Yorkshire

== Micronesia ==
- The Mulgrave Islands, a name used in the 19th century for the Mili and Knox Atolls.

== People ==
- Earl of Mulgrave, a hereditary title
  - Henry Phipps, 1st Earl of Mulgrave (1755–1831), British soldier and politician
  - Edmund Sheffield, 2nd Earl of Mulgrave (1611–1658), English peer
  - John Sheffield, 3rd Earl of Mulgrave (1648–1721), British poet and Tory politician
  - Constantine Phipps, 2nd Baron Mulgrave (1744–1792), British naval officer and explorer

== Other uses ==
- Mulgrave Castle, a ship launched in 1813 and wrecked in 1829
- Port Mulgrave (disambiguation), a number of places with this name
