= Maria Jane Jewsbury =

English writer and poet (1800–1833)

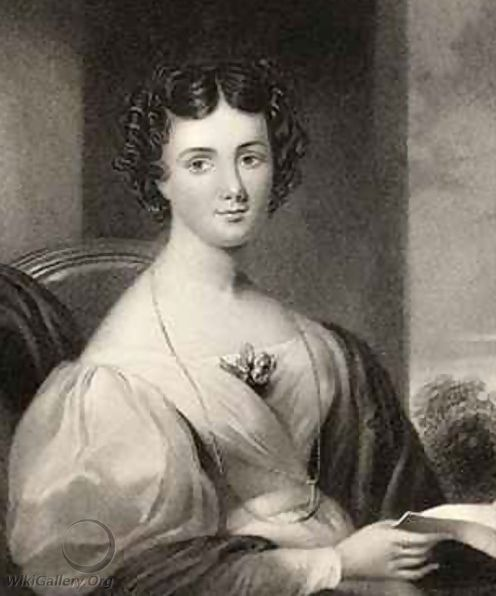
- Born: 25 October 1800; Measham, Derbyshire, England
- Died: 4 October 1833 (aged 32); Poona, Maharashtra, India
- Occupations: writer, poet, literary reviewer
- Spouse: William Kew Fletcher (m. 1832)
- Relatives: Geraldine Jewsbury
- Writing career
- Notable work: The Three Histories

Maria Jane Jewsbury (later Maria Jane Fletcher; 25 October 1800 – 4 October 1833) was an English writer, poet and reviewer. In 1821, while bringing up brothers and sisters, she wrote for the Manchester Gazette. Her Phantasmagoria of poetry and prose (1825), The Three Histories (1830) and Letters to the Young (1837) were highly popular.

Her religious advice tended towards dogmatism and a feeling of Christian right. Phantasmagoria was noticed by William Wordsworth and Dorothy, whom she visited in Lancashire. Other friends were Felicia Hemans, with whom she stayed in Wales in summer 1828, Barbara Hofland, Sara Coleridge, the Roscoes, the Dilkes, the Carter Halls, the Chorleys and Thomas De Quincey. Through its editor, Dilke, she began writing for The Athenaeum in 1830. In 1832 she married Rev. William Kew Fletcher (died 1867) at Penegoes, Montgomeryshire. They sailed for India, but she kept a journal and had poetry printed in The Athenaeum as "The Oceanides".

== Early life and education ==
Maria Jane Jewsbury was born in 1800 in Measham, then Derbyshire, now Leicestershire. She was the daughter of Thomas Jewsbury (died 1840), a cotton manufacturer and merchant, and his wife Maria, born Smith, (died 1819). Her paternal grandfather, Thomas Jewsbury Sr (died 1799), was a surveyor of roads, an engineer of canal navigation, and a student of philosophy. On his death he left the family; four cottages, a warehouse, a piece of land in Measham and a large sum of money.

Jewsbury was the eldest. Her younger brother Thomas was born in 1802, then Henry in 1803, Geraldine in 1812, Arthur in 1815, and Frank in 1819. She attended a school in Shenstone, Staffordshire kept by Miss Adams, and there passed through the routine of ordinary female instruction. Ill-health led her to leave school at 14.

Jewsbury's father worked as the master of a cotton factory, but the War of 1812 with America hurt the cotton business and the family had to move to George Street, Manchester, in 1818, after the business failed. Jewsbury's mother died one month after giving birth. Then 19, Jewsbury took on the mother's role for the household, so that her father could keep working. She continued in the role for over twelve years after their mother's death.

Although Jewsbury developed literary ambitions at the age of nine, she did not begin to read systematically until she was 21. In 1821, she started a course of reading combined with composition of prose and verse. Her reading took the form of desultory enjoyment rather than consistent pursuit of knowledge. It seems to have been about this time that she addressed a letter to William Wordsworth, whose poetry she admired, presumably being keen for sympathy from someone with whose sentiments she sympathised. The letter grew into a correspondence, and led to personal and family intercourse and steady friendship, but without direct benefit to her as an author.

== Career ==
=== Early publications ===
Mr Aston, editor of the Manchester Gazette and acquainted with her father, was the first to print and publish a poem of hers. Impressed by her talents, he introduced her to Alaric Alexander Watts, who from later 1822 edited the Leeds Intelligencer. Three years later he resigned and moved to Manchester to become editor of the Manchester Courier and of an annual volume, The Literary Souvenir, to which Wordsworth, Coleridge, Southey, Montgomery, and Jewsbury herself, contributed. Watts, who married Priscilla "Zillah" Maden Wiffen, the sister of Jeremiah Holmes Wiffen, the historian of the House of Russell, was less than two years older than Jewsbury, and aided her in her work, giving publicity to her occasional poems, urging her to write her first book, Phantasmagoria (1825), and finding a publisher for it.

However, Watts gave up the newspaper in 1825. In 1828–1829 he edited an annual, The Poetical Album, or Register of Modern Fugitive Poetry, to which Jewsbury became a contributor, as she did to several other volumes of a similar kind. The Literary Magnet, The Literary Souvenir, and The Amulet, were likewise indebted to her writings for much of their popularity. Later she wrote for The Athenaeum, contributing to it many of the best pieces she ever composed.

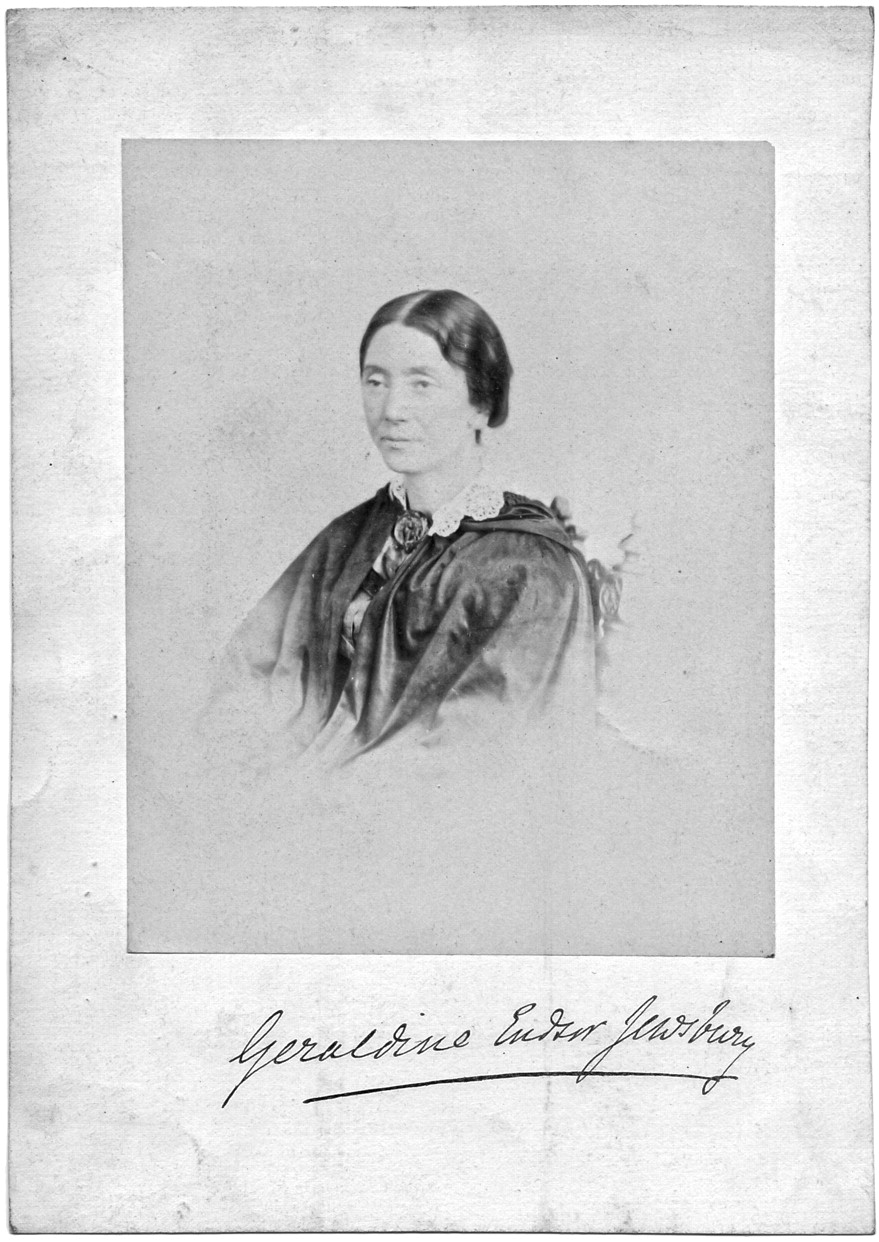
Geraldine Jewsbury

Jewsbury wrote letters to her sister Geraldine in 1828, who was in the Misses Darby's school. In one of these Letters to the Young, she wrote of the dangers of fame for Geraldine, who was aspiring to be a writer, warning that fame would bring sorrow; the only true happiness was to be found was in religion. These letters by Jewsbury followed a spiritual crisis in 1826. Her Phantasmagoria (1825), The Three Histories (1830) and Letters to the Young (1837) were all highly popular.

=== Wales ===
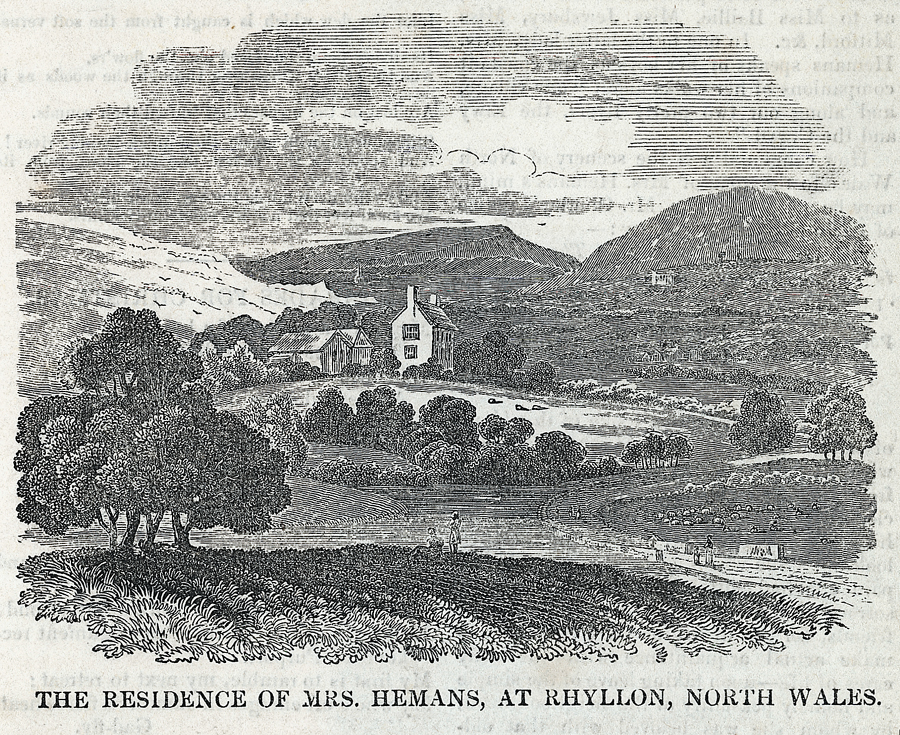
The residence of Mrs Hemans, at Rhyllon, St Asaph, North Wales

Mrs Owen of the Rhyllon farmhouse, near St Asaph, in a memoir of her sister, Mrs Hemans, wrote of Jewsbury's first trip to Wales: "She had long admired the writings of Mrs Hemans with all the enthusiasm which characterised her temperament; and having been for some time in correspondence with her, she eagerly sought for an opportunity of knowing her more nearly, and, with this view, determined upon passing a part of the summer and autumn of 1828 in the neighbourhood of St Asaph. No better accommodation could be found for her than a very small dwelling, called Primrose Cottage.

The place was as unattractive as a cottage in Wales could be, and its closeness to the road took away its rural feel, but it had the advantage of being no more than half a mile from Rhyllon, and had its little garden with pure air. These to any inhabitant of Manchester, which Jewsbury then was, were matters of health and enjoyment. She stayed there with her young sister and brothers; and there Mrs Hemans found her established on her own return from Wavertree at the end of July. From a young age, Jewsbury struggled with poor health, and when she arrived in Wales, she fell ill, but her health soon improved. Many of the poems in her Lays of Leisure Hours, dedicated to Mrs Hemans, "in remembrance of the summer passed in her society", were written in the cottage. Some were immediately addressed to her, particularly "To an Absent One", and the first of the series of "Poetical Portraits" in the same volume was meant to describe her. The picture of Egeria in The Three Histories, written by Jewsbury some time later, came avowedly from the same original.

=== India ===
Having in 1831 become engaged to Rev. William K. Fletcher, a chaplain with the East India Company, she accepted an invitation from her friend Mrs Hughes, sister of Mrs Hemans and then wife of the rector of Penegoes, Montgomeryshire. Assembling her family party there in July the following year, she married Rev. Fletcher in the parish church on 1 August 1832. She had already begun preparing to accompany Fletcher to India. She said goodbye to her family and left for a honeymoon in Britain.

In London, the Fletchers were received by hospitable friends. They embarked from Gravesend aboard the East Indiaman Victory, commanded by Captain Christopher Biden. The first entry in the journal of her voyage bore the date 20 September 1832. The record has interest as a manifestation of character. Jewsbury enlivened the monotony of routine by directing attention to every noticeable change of weather and variety of appearance in the ocean, moon, stars, clouds, fog, and wildlife. However, her comic "Verses composed during a very discomposing breeze" and didactic "The Burden of the Sea" were not among her best effusions.

The voyagers spent Christmas week 1832 on shore at Port Louis, Ceylon, and put to sea again on 29 December 1832. On 2 March 1833, they landed at Bombay and were hospitably received at the house of the Archdeacon. Proceeding to Hurnee with Fletcher, they remained there until the end of May, when he received orders to proceed to Sholapoor, which they reached on 17 June. She entered with eagerness into every new scene, carefully observing every contrast between Asiatic and European aspects of nature, art and social life, and every peculiarity of local manners and habits, more especially the character of the people in connection with their worship. She carefully prepared herself to be of use among them. Drought in and around Sholapoor at the time led to a famine. Rev. Fletcher's main employment on arrival was to mitigate the sufferings of an emaciated population. His anxiety and excessive exertion brought on a dangerous illness, in which his wife nursed him for seven weeks. On his recovery, he obtained a medical certificate stating that his health would not bear the climate, and they set out on 26 September to return to Hurnee. The last entry she made in her journal was dated "Babelgaum, September 26, 1833".

== Death and legacy ==
Her mind tended chiefly towards metaphysics and a poetic form of moral philosophy. Letitia Elizabeth Landon said of her, "I never met with any woman who possessed her powers of conversation. If her language had a fault, it was its extreme perfection. It was like reading an eloquent book, full of thought and poetry. She died too soon...."

Jewsbury became ill in June 1833 and died of cholera at Poona on 4 October 1833. Her remains were interred in the cemetery at Poonah.

She had brought several unpublished works to India, and many were published anonymously after her death. After Jewsbury's death, her siblings Geraldine and Francis retained a collection of their sister's private letters, and of the manuscript "Journal of her Voyage and Residence in India". All her letters, hurried and unstudied, bore marks of intelligence under the steady and habitual control of the highest principles. Her pen ennobled all it touched and gave interest even to small details. The letters throw light on one important trait in her character – the strength and constancy of its attachment – showing her father, her sister, her brothers, and her friends, to have been continually present in her thoughts.

Many of Jewsbury's papers are now in the library of Manchester University.

== The Three Histories ==
The Three Histories (1830) is reckoned clearly to be her best work. The histories are those of an Enthusiast, a Nonchalant, and a Realist. In the first there is a misnomer; the heroine as a child may in parts be deemed enthusiastic, but grows up into a selfish woman of genius, full of worldly ambition that predominates over her few, weak social affections, valuing her rare abilities and attainments merely as a lever to raise her into the sphere of fashionable distinction, delighting in neither literature nor anything else for its own sake, not loving with any true affection that rests satisfied in finding an appropriate object, while regarding all adventitious advantages as pleasant superfluities,

Julia's primary motivation is the pursuit of public recognition and the establishment of a lasting reputation. Unlike writers who publish for financial necessity or specific social causes, she focuses on the acquisition of fame and the adulation of a wider audience. Critics have characterized her approach as prioritizing personal vanity over the promotion of external purposes.

The tale reveals Jewsbury's ability in delineation of character, and it is the ability to depict so many distinct characters, that show Miss Jewsbury's genius with the combined effect of the "Three 2".

== Style and themes ==
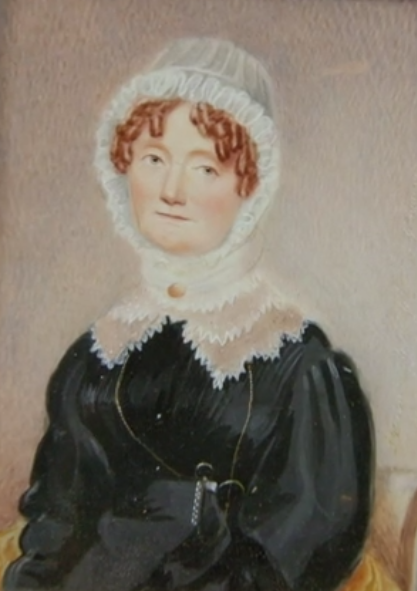
Maria Jane Jewsbury by John Cochran - an 1826 painting rediscovered in 2022 on the Antiques Roadshow

In the process of self-education Jewsbury had not only much to acquire, but much to unlearn. Obsolete phrases of a local dialect haunt her prose, probably derived from daily conversation with uncultivated associates, caught up and made habitual before her taste was formed on purer models. The mercantile idiom, "I will write you" occasionally occurs; and an odd substitution of the preposition "of" in the proper place of the preposition "for", which disfigures her style: "I liked it more than I have liked anything of years," "He has not seen you of a year," etc. This idiosyncratic usage occurs often in the epistles of Margaret Tudor, Queen of Scotland, who, for instance, desires Wolsey to "thank his grace (King Henry VIII) of his diamond that his grace sent me."

Half-consciousness of this habitual fault may probably have induced, by way of counteraction, that sort of fantastic daintiness which sometimes vitiates even her family letters. These faults are mentioned here chiefly to confirm that despite her natural fluency of expression and aptitude in selecting words, the general correctness and elegance of her diction resulted rather from vigilant care. See Mrs Everett Green's Letters of Royal and Illustrious Ladies.

Many passages in her journal are eloquent. "In the best of everything I have done you will find one leading idea – Death; all thoughts, all images, all contrasts of thoughts and images, are derived from living much in the valley of that shadow; from having learned life rather in the vicissitudes of man than woman; from the mind being Hebraic. My poetry, except some half-dozen pieces, may be consigned to oblivion; but in all you would find the sober hue, which to my mind's eye blends equally with the golden glow of sunset, and the bright green of spring; and is seen equally in the temple of delight as in the tomb of decay and separation. I am melancholy by nature, but cheerful on principle."

== Selected works ==
- Phantasmagoria (1825)
- The Oceanides (1832-33)
- The Three Histories (1830)
- Letters to the Young (1837)
