= Mrs. Cornwell Baron Wilson =

British writer (1797–1846)

Margaret Harries Wilson
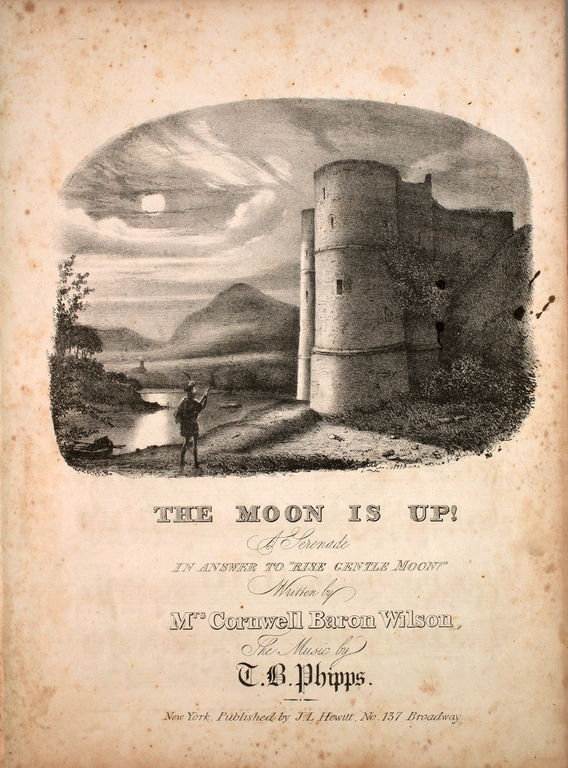
- "The Moon is Up" – lyrics by Wilson
- Born: Margaret Harries; 1796; Shropshire, England
- Died: 1846 (aged 49–50); London, England
- Occupations: Poet; playwright; lyricist; writer; editor; biographer
- Spouse: Mr. Wilson (m. 1819)
- Writing career
- Pen name: Mrs. Cornwell Baron Wilson

Margaret Harries Wilson (also known as Mrs. Cornwell Baron Wilson; 1796–1846) was an English poet, playwright, lyricist, writer and editor. She is considered one of the first female biographers.

== Life ==
Margaret Harries was born in Shropshire in 1796. She created her first book of poetry in 1815, and after her second poetry collection was published, she married a solicitor in 1819. After this, she worked under her married name. Wilson was content to be "a domestic poet" as she considered that men could have larger ambitions. Wilson had a number of children, several of whom died, and this became a theme of several of her publications.

She wrote a poem in tribute to Anna Brownell Jameson who had the clever idea of writing a book about the fictional and actual loves of the famous poets of the time. The Loves of the Poets enabled readers to put themselves in the role of having a poet as an admirer.

Wilson wrote for journals including The Literary Magnet, Forget Me Not, Friendship's Offering, The Keepsake and Pledge of Friendship. She wrote poems, prose and music and this was presented in her own 1833 publication, La Ninon, or, Leaves for the Album. Contributors to this included the notable writers Mary Howitt and Agnes Strickland. A publication that became New Monthly Belle Assemblée was also started in 1833, with Wilson as its first editor, and this also included items on fashion. Wilson also wrote plays and one was retitled as Venus in Arms and it was performed at the Strand Theatre in 1836.

Her final achievement was as a biographer as she published three including The Life and Correspondence of M. G. Lewis. This was about her fellow writer and playwright which she published in two volumes anonymously in 1839. Wilson is considered one of the first female biographers. In her work Our Actresses, she acknowledges that these 67 women are admired, but they individually do not get a high position in society.

Wilson died in London on 12 January 1846.

== Selected works ==
1. Hours at Home: a Collection of Miscellaneous Poems, 1826
2. The Cypress Wreath: a Collection of Original Ballads and Tales in Verse, 1828
3. Poems, 1831
4. Water Music, a Collection of National Melodies … Arranged with a Guitar Accompaniment, 1832
5. The Life and Correspondence of M. G. Lewis, 1839
6. A Volume of Lyrics, 1840
7. Chronicles of Life, 1840
8. Popularity: and the Destinies of Woman: Tales of the World, 1842
9. Our Actresses; or Glances at Stage Favourites past and present, 1844
