= List of shipwrecks in September 1825 =

The list of shipwrecks in September 1825 includes some ships sunk, wrecked or otherwise lost during September 1825.

== 2 September ==
List of shipwrecks: 2 September 1825
Ship	State	Description
Ceres	United Kingdom	The ship struck a sunken rock off Lambay Island, County Dublin and foundered. Her crew were rescued. She was on a voyage from Staxigoe, Caithness to Dublin.

== 3 September ==
List of shipwrecks: 3 September 1825
Ship	State	Description
Adelphi	United Kingdom	The ship departed from Saint John, New Brunswick for Liverpool, Lancashire. No further trace, presumed foundered in the Atlantic Ocean with the loss of all hands.
Mulgrave Castle	United Kingdom	During a voyage from London to Bombay, India, the ship ran ashore without loss of life on Green Point, Cape of Good Hope. During salvage operations in September, she broke up during a gale and became a total loss.

== 6 September ==
List of shipwrecks: 6 September 1825
Ship	State	Description
Four Gebroeders	Bremen	The ship sprang a leak and was abandoned in the North Sea 5 leagues (15 nautical miles (28 km)) off Texel, North Holland, Netherlands. She was on a voyage from Hull, Yorkshire, United Kingdom to Bremen.
Leveret	United Kingdom	The ship ran aground on the Domesnes Reef, in the Baltic Sea and sank. She was on a voyage from Pärnu, Russia to Hull.
Maryann	(United Kingdom of Great Britain and Ireland) Bahamas	The ship was wrecked on the Exuma Keys. She was on a voyage from Nassau to Ragged Island.
Shamrock	United Kingdom	The ship was attacked and sunk in the Mediterranean Sea by a Hellenic Navy cruiser. Her crew were rescued. She was on a voyage from Alexandria, Egypt to Candia, Crete and Corfu.

== 7 September ==
List of shipwrecks: 7 September 1825
Ship	State	Description
Abigail	(United Kingdom of Great Britain and Ireland) British North America	The ship was lost in the Turks Islands. Her crew were rescued. She was on a voyage from Saint John, New Brunswick to Jamaica.
Eclipse	United States	The ship was wrecked in the Abaco Islands. Her crew survived. She was on a voyage from Charleston, South Carolina to Havana, Cuba.
Mary	United Kingdom	The ship was driven ashore and wrecked at Nassau, Bahamas. She was on a voyage from Liverpool, Lancashire to Madeira and Havana.
Mary & Elizabeth	United Kingdom	The ship was driven ashore at Nassau. She was refloated the next day.
Orthezien	Flag unknown	The ship was driven ashore and wrecked at Nassau. Her crew were rescued.
Patriot	United States	The ship was wrecked in the Abaco Islands. Her crew were rescued. She was on a voyage from Boston, Massachusetts to Havana.
Venus	United States	The ship was wrecked in the Abaco Islands. Her crew survived. She was on a voyage from Baltimore, Maryland to Key West, Florida Territory.

== 8 September ==
List of shipwrecks: 8 September 1825
Ship	State	Description
Eliza	United Kingdom	The ship sprang a leak and was abandoned by her crew. She was on a voyage from Faaborg, Denmark to Liverpool, Lancashire.
Friendship	France	The ship was wrecked in the Bahamas. Her crew were rescued. She was on a voyage from St. Jago de Cuba, Cuba to Havre de Grâce, Seine-Inférieure.
Safeguard	United Kingdom	The sloop was driven ashore and sank at Stornoway, Isle of Lewis, Outer Hebrides.
Three Brothers	United States	The ship was lost in the Bahamas. Her crew were rescued. She was on a voyage from Boston, Massachusetts to Grenada.

== 9 September ==
List of shipwrecks: 9 September 1825
Ship	State	Description
Cochrane	United Kingdom	The ship was wrecked on a reef off Petty Harbour, Newfoundland, British North America. Her crew were rescued. She was on a voyage from Porto, Portugal to Newfoundland.
Flora	United Kingdom	The ship was driven ashore at Campo Bello, New Brunswick, British North America, She was on a voyage from New York to New Brunswick.
Revenge	France	The brig foundered off the coast of the Florida Territory. Five crew survived.

== 10 September ==
List of shipwrecks: 10 September 1825
Ship	State	Description
Adelphi	United Kingdom	The ship was driven ashore on the south coast of Cape Sable Island, Nova Scotia, British North America. All on board were rescued. She was on a voyage from Saint John, New Brunswick, British North America to Liverpool, Lancashire.
Dumfries	United Kingdom	The sloop departed from Dumfries for Dublin. No further trace, presumed foundered with the loss of all hands.
Lively	United Kingdom	The ship was wrecked on the Long Rock, in the Irish Sea off Donaghadee, County Down with the loss of all hands. She was on a voyage from Whitehaven, Cumberland to Newry, County Antrim.

== 11 September ==
List of shipwrecks: 11 September 1825
Ship	State	Description
Fame	United Kingdom	The ship was driven ashore near Wexford. Her crew were rescued. She was refloated on 25 September.
Leonardus	Netherlands	The ship foundered off Point Lynas, Anglesey. Her crew were rescued. She was on a voyage from Liverpool, Lancashire, United Kingdom to Dordrecht, South Holland.
Seneca	United Kingdom	The ship struck the Cross Sand, in the North Sea off the coast of Norfolk and foundered. Here crew were rescued.
Superior	United Kingdom	The ship was driven ashore and wrecked in Dundrum Bay. She was on a voyage from Liverpool, Lancashire to New York, United States.
Swift	(United Kingdom of Great Britain and Ireland) Jersey	The ship was driven ashore and wrecked in the Bay of Blanc Sablons, Labrador, British North America. Her crew were rescued.
Thomas Pym and Penrose	United Kingdom	The ship was wrecked at Great River, Newfoundland, British North America. Her crew were rescued.

== 12 September ==
List of shipwrecks: 12 September 1825
Ship	State	Description
Active	United Kingdom	The whaler was abandoned in the Davis Strait. She subsequently came ashore. Perseverance (United Kingdom) discovered Active 3 August 1826. A skeleton crew sailed her for Peterhead, Aberdeenshire, where she arrived on 12 September.

== 13 September ==
List of shipwrecks: 13 September 1825
Ship	State	Description
Vriendschap	Netherlands	The ship was abandoned in the North Sea. She was on a voyage from Christiansand, Norway to Harlingen, Friesland.

== 14 September ==
List of shipwrecks: 14 September 1824
Ship	State	Description
John Buschman	United Kingdom	The ship ran aground on the Lapsand, in the Baltic Sea off the coast of Denmark. She was on a voyage from Saint Petersburg, Russia to London. John Buschman was refloated on 20 September and resumed her voyage.
HMS Sappho	Royal Navy	The Cruizer-class brig-sloop struck the Sisters Rocks, off Halifax, Nova Scotia, British North America, and was severely damaged. Her crew survived. She was declared a total loss on 8 November and was eventually broken up at Halifax in 1830.

== 15 September ==
List of shipwrecks: 15 September 1825
Ship	State	Description
Laura Ann	United States	The ship sprang a leak and was abandoned in the Atlantic Ocean. Her crew were rescued. She was on a voyage from Virginia to Liverpool, Lancashire, United Kingdom.

== 16 September ==
List of shipwrecks: 16 September 1825
Ship	State	Description
Benjamin	United Kingdom	The ship was severely damaged by a hurricane in the Atlantic Ocean (46°00′N 16°00′W). She was consequently abandoned on 26 September. Her crew were rescued by John (United Kingdom). Benjamin was on a voyage from Antigua to London.
Jong Hinrick	Kingdom of Hanover	The ship sprang a leak and was abandoned 8 nautical miles (15 km) off the coast of Norway. Her crew were rescued by a Norwegian brig. She was on a voyage from Delfzijl, Groningen, Netherlands to a Norwegian port.
Pomona	United Kingdom	The ship was driven ashore in the River Tay. She was on a voyage from Riga, Russia to Dundee, Forfarshire. Pomona was refloated on 18 September and taken in to Dundee.
Resolution	United Kingdom	The ship was driven ashore near Crail, Fife. She was on a voyage from Riga to Grangemouth, Stirlingshire.
Robert	United Kingdom	The ship struck the New Grounds, off the Tuskar Rock and was abandoned by her crew. They were rescued by Redmont (United Kingdom). Robert was on a voyage from Bangor to Newcastle upon Tyne, Northumberland.

== 17 September ==
List of shipwrecks: 17 September 1825
Ship	State	Description
Byron	United States	The ship was driven ashore and wrecked at Mackracock, Argyllshire, United Kingdom. Her crew were rescued. She was on a voyage from Liverpool, Lancashire, United Kingdom to New York.
Charles	United States	The ship was lost in the River Plate. Her crew were rescued.
Hannah Isabella	United Kingdom	The ship departed from Port Royal, Jamaica for Xagua, Cuba. No further trace, presumed foundered with the loss of all hands.
Laxcros	Sweden	The ship was driven ashore on Texel, North Holland, Netherlands. She was on a voyage from Stockholm to Amsterdam, North Holland.

== 18 September ==
List of shipwrecks: 18 September 1825
Ship	State	Description
Sisters	United Kingdom	The ship was abandoned in the Atlantic Ocean. Her crew were rescued by Venerable (United Kingdom). Sisters was on a voyage from Leith, Lothian to Miramichi, New Brunswick, British North America.
Venus	United Kingdom	The ship ran aground on the Foreness Rock, Margate, Kent. She was on a voyage from London to Aberavon, Glamorgan. Venus was refloated on 23 September and taken in to Margate. She resumed her voyage the next day.

== 19 September ==
List of shipwrecks: 19 September 1825
Ship	State	Description
Aurora	Russia	The ship was driven ashore near Arles, Bouches-du-Rhône, France. She was on a voyage from Arkhangelsk to Marseille, Bouches-du-Rhône.
Flora	United States	The ship was driven ashore and wrecked on Campobello Island, New Brunswick, British North America. She was on a voyage from New York to a port in New Brunswick.

== 22 September ==
List of shipwrecks: 22 September 1825
Ship	State	Description
Bella Alliance	Portugal	The ship was driven ashore and wrecked on Terceira Island, Azores.
Ceres	United Kingdom	The ship foundered off "Lamber Island". Her crew were rescued. She was on a voyage from "Starigo", Scotland to Dublin.
Emilia	United Kingdom	The ship was driven ashore and wrecked on Terceira Island.
Hannah	(United Kingdom of Great Britain and Ireland) Grenada	The sloop foundered at La Baye.
Lady Ford	United Kingdom	The ship was driven ashore and wrecked at Faial Island, Azores. Her crew were rescued.
Nova Sociedade	Portugal	The ship was driven ashore and wrecked at Faial Island. Her crew were rescued.
Resolution	United Kingdom	The ship was driven ashore and wrecked near Garlieston, Wigtownshire. Her crew were rescued. She was on a voyage from Dumfries to Whitehaven, Cumberland.
Rio Packet	France	The ship was wrecked on the Cobea Reef, off the coast of Mexico.
Triumfo de Infega	Portugal	The ship was driven ashore and wrecked at Faial Islands. Her crew were rescued.

== 23 September ==
List of shipwrecks: 23 September 1825
Ship	State	Description
Armoricain	France	The ship departed from Madeira for Senegal. No further trace, presumed foundered with the loss of all hands.
Pilgrim	United Kingdom	The ship was driven ashore and wrecked near Arklow, County Wicklow. Her crew were rescued. She was on a voyage from Milford Haven, Pembrokeshire to Newport, Monmouthshire.

== 24 September ==
List of shipwrecks: 24 September 1825
Ship	State	Description
Hercules	United Kingdom	The ship was lost near Ventava, Courland Governorate. She was on a voyage from London to Riga, Russia.
Kate	(United Kingdom of Great Britain and Ireland) British North America	The schooner was wrecked on Cape Breton Island. Her crew were rescued.
Lively	United Kingdom	The ship was wrecked off Donaghadee, County Tyrone with the loss of all ten crew.
Nautilus	United Kingdom	The ship was lost near Stolpmünde with the loss of a crew member.

== 25 September ==
List of shipwrecks: 25 September 1825
Ship	State	Description
Roelgnol	(United Kingdom of Great Britain and Ireland) Jersey	The brig was driven ashore and severely damaged at Gaspé, Lower Canada, British North America.

== 26 September ==
List of shipwrecks: 26 September 1825
Ship	State	Description
Benjamin	United Kingdom	The ship was abandoned in the Atlantic Ocean. Her crew were rescued by John Twizell (United Kingdom). Benjamin was on a voyage from Antigua to London.
Edward Protheroe	United Kingdom	The ship was run aground in Roman Bay, County Londonderry and was beached. She was on a voyage from Porto, Portugal to Londonderry.

== 27 September ==
List of shipwrecks: 27 September 1825
Ship	State	Description
Jenny Nettles	(United Kingdom of Great Britain and Ireland) Jamaica	The ship was wrecked off the mouth of the Rio Grande. Her crew were rescued. She was on a voyage from Port Maria to Kingston.
Victory	United States	The ship was wrecked at Alvarado, Veracruz, Mexico with the loss of six of her crew. She was on a voyage from Tampico, Mexico to Alvarado.

== 28 September ==
List of shipwrecks: 28 September 1825
Ship	State	Description
Flying Fish	United Kingdom	The ship sprang a leak and foundered in the English Channel off The Lizard, Cornwall. Her crew were rescued by Champion of Wales (United Kingdom). She was on a voyage from Newcastle upon Tyne, Northumberland to Porto, Portugal.
Jane	United Kingdom	The ship foundered off the mouth of the River Shannon. She was on a voyage from Sligo to Bristol, Gloucestershire.
Laurel	United Kingdom	The ship was driven ashore at Worthing, Sussex. She was refloated on 9 October and taken in to Shoreham-by-Sea, Sussex, where she capsized and sank. Her crew were rescued. She was subsequently refloated.
Neva	United Kingdom	The ship ran aground on the Haisborough Sands, in the North Sea off the coast of Norfolk. She was refloated and consequently beached at Winterton-on-Sea, Norfolk. Her crew were rescued. Neva was on a voyage from Memel, Prussia to London. She was refloated on 14 October and taken in to Great Yarmouth, Norfolk.
Protector	United Kingdom	The sloop foundered off the mouth of the River Shannon with the loss of all hands.

== 29 September ==
List of shipwrecks: 29 September 1825
Ship	State	Description
Abdere	(United Kingdom of Great Britain and Ireland) Jamaica	The ship was wrecked in a hurricane in Cuba.
Fleece	United Kingdom	The ship was wrecked at Redcar, Yorkshire. She was on a voyage from Sunderland, County Durham to London.
Jane	United Kingdom	The ship foundered off the Blasquets. Her crew were rescued by Mary Ann (United Kingdom). Jane was on a voyage from Galway to Bristol, Gloucestershire.
Margaret	United Kingdom	The ship departed from Limerick for London. No further trace, presumed foundered with the loss of all hands.
Matthews	United Kingdom	The ship was driven ashore at Hove, Sussex. She was refloated on 11 October and taken in to Shoreham-by-Sea, Sussex.

== 30 September ==
List of shipwrecks: 30 September 1825
Ship	State	Description
Ecton	United Kingdom	The ship was driven ashore near Kinsale, County Cork.
Woodcock	United Kingdom	The ship departed from Saint Petersburg, Russia for Liverpool, Lancashire. Presumed subsequently foundered in the Skaggerak with the loss of all hands.

== Unknown date ==
List of shipwrecks: Unknown date in September 1825
Ship	State	Description
Adriana	United States	The ship was lost off Cape San Antonio, Cuba. Her crew were rescued. She was on a voyage from Trinidad, Cuba to Philadelphia, Pennsylvania.
Jane	Norway	The ship was abandoned in the North Sea. She was on a voyage from Christiana to Southampton, Hampshire, United Kingdom. Jane was subsequently taken in to Great Yarmouth, Norfolk, United Kingdom.
Jane and Barbara	United Kingdom	The ship was driven ashore at Arkhangelsk, Russia before 9 September. She was on a voyage from Bristol, Gloucestershire to Arkhangelsk. Jane & Barbara was refloated on 28 September and taken in to Arkhangelsk.
HMS Lady Nelson	Royal Navy	The brig was captured by pirates off the Babar Islands before 22 September. Her crew were all murdered and the ship was subsequently wrecked.
Louisa	(United Kingdom of Great Britain and Ireland) British North America	The ship was wrecked on Scaterie Island, Nova Scotia. Her crew were rescued. She was on a voyage from Trinidad to Quebec City, Lower Canada
Mariner	United Kingdom	The ship was wrecked off Cape Sweet Nose, Russia before 9 September.
Sylph	United Kingdom	The ship was wrecked off Cape Sweet Nose, Russia before 9 September.
Trafalgar	United Kingdom	The ship was abandoned in the Atlantic Ocean on or before 24 September. Her crew were rescued by Wansbeck (United Kingdom). Trafalgar was on a voyage from Pugwash, Nova Scotia to Quebec City, Lower Canada, British North America.
Virgin del Carmen	Spain	The ship was captured by a Colombia cruiser. She was subsequently run ashore near "Conil".
