= Our Cousins in Ohio =

Story of a Quaker immigrant family in Ohio

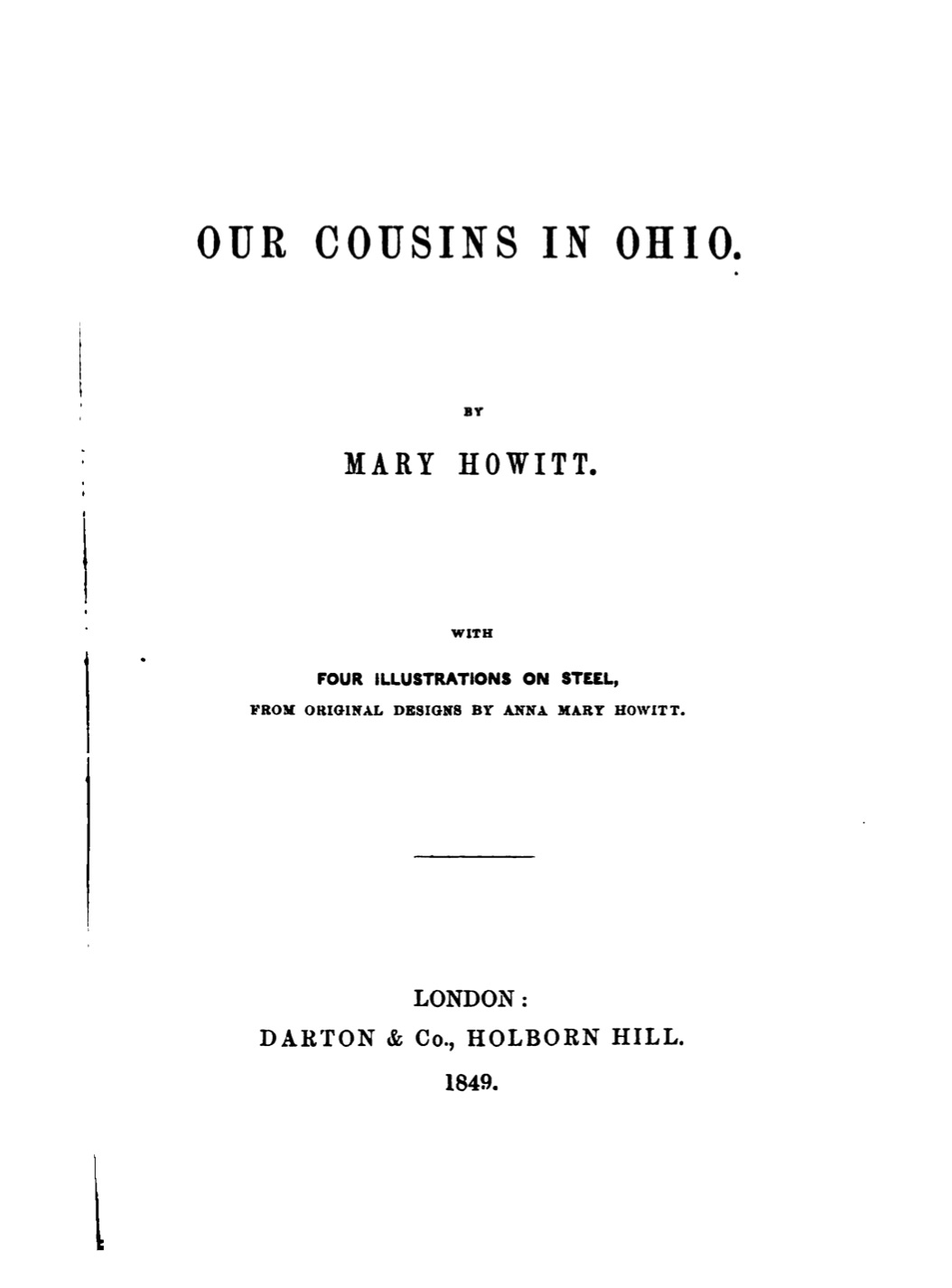
- Title page for Our Cousins in Ohio (1849)
- Author: Mary Botham Howitt
- Language: English
- Genre: Family biography
- Published: 1849
- Publication place: United Kingdom

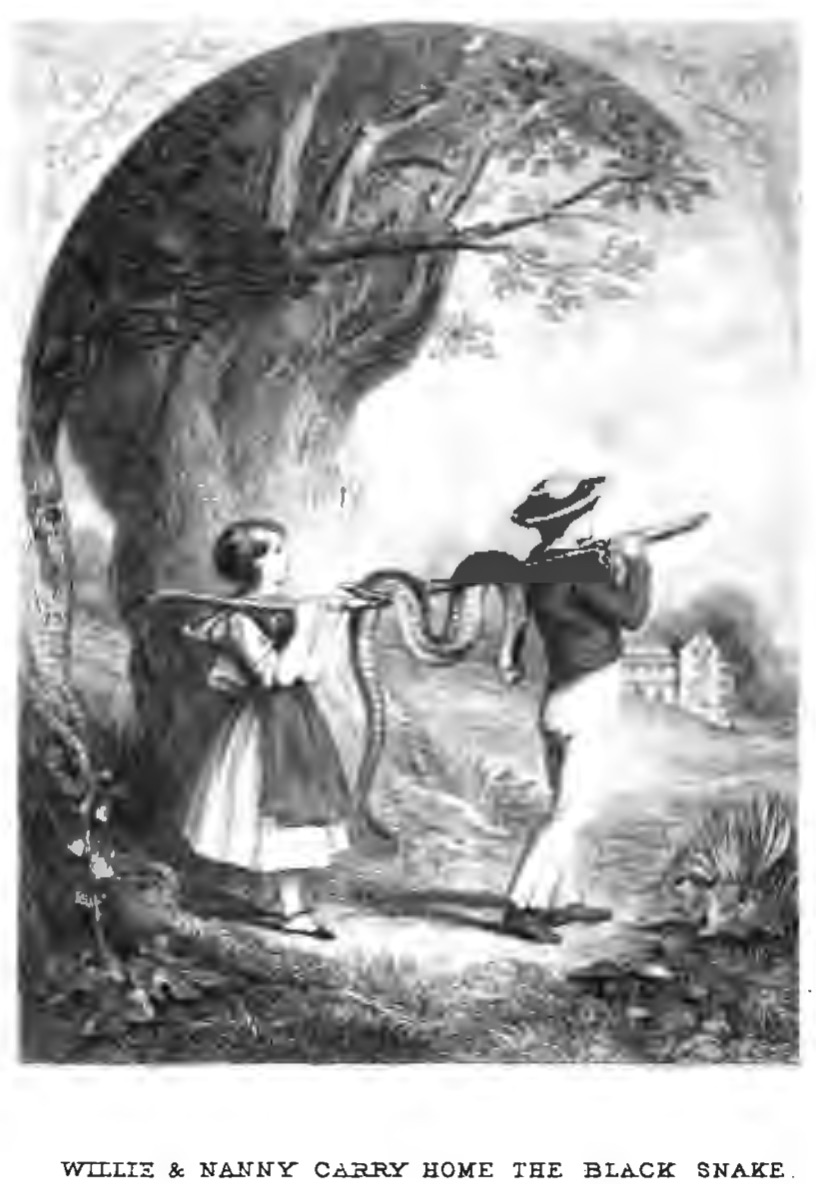
Willie and Nanny Carry Home the Black Snake

Our Cousins in Ohio is an account of a year in the life of a Quaker immigrant family in Ohio in the 1840s, written by Mary Botham Howitt. It is based on letters from her sister Emma Botham Alderson (1806–1847), who left England in 1842 with her husband, Harrison Alderson (1800–1871), and three children, William Charles (1837–1914), Agnes (1839–1925), and Anna Mary (1841–1934). In the Preface, Howitt describes Our Cousins in Ohio as a "companion volume" to The Children's Year (1847), which had documented, in a similar way, a year in the life of her own two youngest children, Margaret and Charlton Herbert.

== History and development ==
The first edition was dated 1849, though it was available for purchase in December 1848, perhaps to capitalize on the Christmas market. It was reprinted several times in the United States and in England during the 1850s and then again in 1866. The English editions included four engravings based on illustrations by Howitt's daughter, the artist Anna Mary Howitt.

The original letters on which Mary Howitt's work was based are held in Manuscripts and Special Collections at the University of Nottingham in United Kingdom.

== Plot and setting ==
The narrative takes place in and around the family's farm and home, called "The Cedars", located near the village of Athens, a fictional name for the village of Warsaw (now incorporated into Cincinnati) on the west bank of the Great Miami River in Hamilton County, Ohio. The original home was torn down in the 1850s, and the site is now occupied by Seton High School.

Instead of following a single unifying plot, the narrative is organized as a calendar year, with a separate chapter for each month, beginning and ending with classic scenes of emigrant Christmas. Within this calendrical structure are incorporated numerous threads relating to domestic life (e.g. the parents' attempts at dealing with Willy's stubbornness, confrontations with a neighborhood bully, raising crops and livestock, exploring the neighboring woods) and to social issues of the day (e.g. slavery and abolition, soldiers on their way to war with Mexico, westward migration, and the practices of various religious and national groups).

== Characters ==
At her sister's request, Howitt changed the names of many of the characters. The following are some of the names from Our Cousins in Ohio that can be identified with actual people:

Our Cousins	Model
Mother	Emma Alderson
Father	Harrison Alderson
Willie, William	William Charles Alderson
Florence	Agnes Alderson
Cornelia, Nelly	Alice Ann Alderson (1844–1855)
Felicia Bower	Jane Bonsal (c.1834-?)
Madame Leonard	Mary Crehore
Cousin Israel Hopper	Thompson Harrison (b. 1813)
Cousin Margaret	Elizabeth Mason
David Hutchinson	Abraham Taylor
Aunt Hutchinson	Elizabeth Taylor
Uncle Cornelius	Joseph W. Taylor (1810–1880)

== Literary and historical significance ==
Our Cousins in Ohio has been identified as an exemplary work of collaborative life writing and domestic literary production. Mary and her husband William, sometimes with the assistance of their daughters, Margaret Howitt and Anna Mary Howitt, collaborated on numerous books and articles. "From the beginning," writes Linda Peterson, "the Howitts' model of authorship was collaborative, including joint publication and, more comprehensively, an approach to authorship as a family activity and business." Later, Peterson notes that in both their content and their mode of production, Howitt's domestic narratives enact an ideology of domestic life and especially of collaborative work that bind the family together.

In extending that domestic collaboration across the Atlantic and focusing on the home of an immigrant settler, instead of on the English home more typical of Howitt's writing, Peterson argues that Our Cousins in Ohio "is based on -- indeed, seeks to extend -- certain British social, cultural, and political values, including the Howitts' Radical abolitionist views."

It has also been noted that Our Cousins in Ohio introduced dozens of American words and expressions to British readers, often earlier than any recorded instance in the Oxford English Dictionary. Moreover, unlike other writers of her time who wrote about Americanisms, Howitt expresses no disapprobation.
