= Victory (1816 ship) =

UK India-built merchantman 1816–1837

History

United Kingdom
- Name: Victory
- Builder: James Macrae, Chittagong
- Launched: 8 September 1816
- Fate: Condemned 1837

General characteristics
- Tons burthen: 677, or 683, or 712, or 71224/94 (bm)
- Length: 128 ft 0 in (39.0 m)
- Beam: 38 ft 6 in (11.7 m)

Victory was launched at Chittagong in 1816. Between April 1817 and 1821 she was under French ownership, but then returned to Calcutta registry. She was condemned at Manila in March 1837.

== Career ==
Victory was under French ownership from April 1817 to 1821, then British ownership and Calcutta registry again.

Victory appeared in the register at Calcutta in 1824 with C.Reid, master, and M.Crisp, owner.

Lloyd's List carried a letter from the Cape of Good Hope dated 20 September 1827 that reported that Mulgrave Castle had wrecked there while sailing from London to Bombay. Most of her stores and cargo was expected to be saved. Victory, Ferguson, master, was take the undamaged cargo to its destination; the damaged cargo would be auctioned.

In 1827 Victory's master was G.Farquarhson and her owner was Abercrombie & Co. At some point her registry was shifted from Calcutta to Great Britain. Thereafter she appeared in Lloyd's Register.

Year	Master	Owner	Trade	Source
1830	Farquarhson	Heatharson	London–Madras	Lloyd's Register; large repair 1825
1835	C[hristopher] Biden	W. H. Biden & Co.		Lloyd's Register

In September 1832, Victory, Biden, master carried Maria Jane Jewsbury, an English writer, poet, and reviewer, to India.

Then on 2 May 1835 Biden was sailing by the Chagos Archipelago when he sighted a group of three islets at 5°39.25′N 72°25.75′E that he named Nelson's Islands. They probably had been seen in 1833 by Captain Adam Dixon in Severn, who had named the group Severn Island.

== Fate ==
On 10 January 1837 Victory put into Manila on passage from Singapore for Canton, leaking badly. On 16 March she underwent a survey at Manila that found her waterlogged and unseaworthy; her owners sold her for breaking up.
