= Phillippa (1813 ship) =

History

United Kingdom
- Name: Phillippa
- Owner: 1816:Paxton; 1820:E. Brightman & Co.
- Builder: Michael Smith, Howrah, Calcutta
- Launched: 21 May 1813
- Fate: Sold 1822

General characteristics
- Tons burthen: 555, or 574, or 580, or 5877/94, or 588 (bm)
- Length: 124 ft 1 in (37.8 m)
- Beam: 33 ft 4 in (10.2 m)
- Notes: Teak-built; three decks

Phillippa was launched in 1813 at Howrah, Calcutta. She sailed to England and then traded between England and India under a license from the British East India Company. She was sold in 1822.

== Career ==
Phillippa first appeared in Lloyd's Register in 1816 with Nicholls, master, Paxton, owner, and trade London–India.

Porto Praya incident (1816): In May 1816 Mulgrave Castle was on a voyage from London to the Cape of Good Hope when she struck rocks at Boa Vista, Cape Verde, and came into Port Praya. Philippa, G. Nichols, master, came into Porto Praya on 18 May as she was travelling from London to India. Philippa was seeking water and supplies, and the initial report was that both intended to leave towards the end of the month.

Captain Nichols spoke with Captain Ralph and agreed to take part of Mulgrave Castle's cargo to the Cape of Good Hope so that Mulgrave Castle could sail to Rio de Janeiro for repairs. This news infuriated the governor of Porto Praia, Don Antonio de Continto de Laneastie. Don Antonio had intended to have Mulgrave Castle surveyed and condemned in order that he might profit from the disposal of her cargo. Don Antonio incarcerated Ralph and Nichols, put fifty soldiers aboard Phillipa, and declared one of her passengers, a Captain Harrington, a prisoner on parole. Eventually the governor relented and permitted the British vessels to leave. Captains Nichols, Ralph, and Harrington, as well as the other passengers on the vessels, signed a letter of protest to Don Antonio, informing him that they would bring the matter up with the "Right Hon. Viscount Strangford, the British Ambassador at the Court of Brazils, to be by him submitted to the Prince Regent of Portugal, and to the British Government."

In 1820 Phillippa's master was still G. Nichols, but her owner was E. Brightman & Co.

== Fate ==
In 1822 her owners sold her to Arabs at Bussorah.
