= Alaric Alfred Watts =

British government clerk, spiritualist, and writer

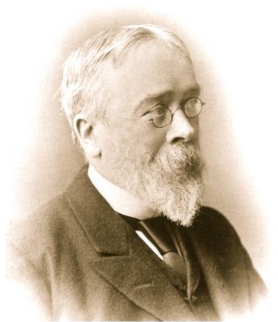
Alaric Alfred Watts, c. 1890

Alaric Alfred Watts (18 February 1825 – 22 January 1901), best known as A. A. Watts, was a British government clerk, spiritualist and writer.

== Early life and education ==
He was the son of a literary couple, poet and editor Alaric Alexander Watts and editor Priscilla "Zillah" Maden Wiffen, who were close friends of William Howitt and Mary Howitt, the parents of Alfred's wife Anna Mary Howitt.

Watts was educated at University College School and worked as a clerk at the Inland Revenue Office from 1844 onwards. A year later, William Michael Rossetti became his colleague.

== Career ==
Like his father, Watts was also a poet. Before 1856, he contributed his poems anonymously to the literary annual The Keepsake and the weekly Chambers's Edinburgh Journal.

In 1859 he married Anna Mary Howitt. Like his wife, he was a convinced spiritualist. In 1882, with his friend William Stainton Moses, he formed The Ghost Club.

atts was a member of the London Spiritualist Alliance. He was also a member of the Society for Psychical Research, but resigned after some of its members such as Eleanor Sidgwick dismissed the medium William Eglinton as fraudulent.

Watts published jointly with his wife a volume entitled Aurora: a volume of verse.

== Publications ==
- Aurora: A Volume of Verse (1875)
- Alaric Watts: A Narrative of His Life (Volume 1, Volume 2 1884)
