= Port Mulgrave =

Port Mulgrave may refer to:

- Port Mulgrave, North Yorkshire, a hamlet in North Yorkshire, England
- an 18th-century name for Yakutat Bay, Alaska
- a 19th-century name for Mulgrave, Nova Scotia
