= Anna Mary Howitt =

English painter and writer (1824–1885)

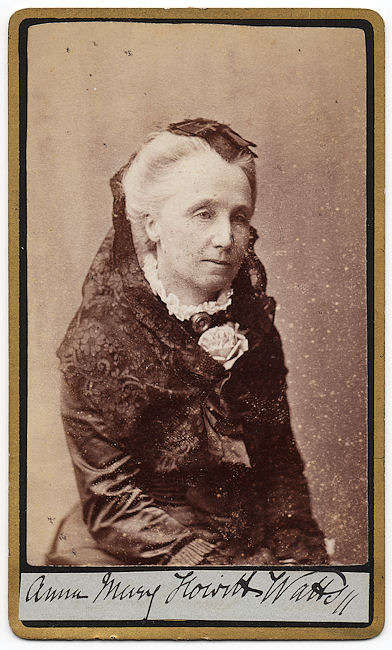
- Born: 15 January 1824; Nottingham, England
- Died: 23 July 1884 (aged 60); Dietenheim, South Tyrol, Austria-Hungary
- Education: Cary's Art Academy (London) and a private two-year apprenticeship under Wilhelm von Kaulbach (Munich)
- Spouse: Alaric Alfred Watts
- Children: None
- Parent(s): William Howitt (1792–1879); Mary Botham

Anna Mary Howitt, Mrs Howitt-Watts (15 January 1824 – 23 July 1884) was an English Pre-Raphaelite professional (history) painter, professional writer, women's rights activist and spiritualist. Following a health crisis in 1856, she exhibited rarely as a painter, but continued to work as a professional writer. She became a pioneering drawing medium. The term "automatic drawing" likely originated with her. As a member of the married women's property committee, she initiated the women's rights movement in the UK.

== Early life and education ==
Anna Mary Howitt was born in Nottingham as the eldest child of the Quaker writers and publishers William Howitt (1792–1879) and Mary Botham (1799–1888). She also spent her childhood in Esher.

She started to illustrate her mother's literary work at the age of 10. When her father William Howitt showed her designs of the heads of The Seven Temptations to Henry Sass, the principal of the Sass's Academy, several other artists, including his successor Francis Stephen Cary, were impressed.

The family moved to Heidelberg when Anna Mary was a teenager, as they felt Germany offered better educational options. There, she met famous writers and painters, including the well-known history painter Wilhelm von Kaulbach who inspired her to become a professional history painter. She also met the Swedish writer Frederika Bremer, because her mother was learning Swedish and Danish to be able to translate the works of Bremer and Hans Christian Andersen. Bremer inspired Anna Mary's activism for the woman's cause.

She returned to London with her family when her little brother Claude suffered a knee infection, and her parents did not want to see his leg amputated. Her brother's death in 1844 led to bouts of depression. It was not the first time she lost a brother. In 1828, when she was four, she had lost her two-year-old brother Charles.

== Painter, writer and women's rights activist ==
In 1845, Anna Mary met Barbara Leigh Smith, a landscape painter and women's rights activist, in Hastings. A network of young aspiring professional women artists was formed who tried to establish a 'Sisterhood in art' as an alternative to the Pre-Raphaelite Brotherhood. They included Bessie Rayner Parkes and Eliza Bridell Fox.

In the winter of 1845/1846, Anna Mary tried to persuade Barbara to enter Cary's Art Academy in London, where she was studying alongside the future Pre-Raphaelites William Holman Hunt, Dante Gabriel Rossetti, Thomas Woolner and her artistic sister Eliza 'Tottie' Fox. This was one of the few places where female artists could receive first-class tuition.

Her art teacher and the head of the Sass's art school in Bloomsbury, Francis Stephen Cary, who had seen Anna Mary's illustrations she made as a 10-year-old, personally paid for her fees when her parents went bankrupt. He even arranged sittings expressly for her. One of these sittings — probably arranged by Cary for Howitt — was for a portrait of the American painter John Banvard. Anna Mary painted this portrait in his apartment rooms in London.

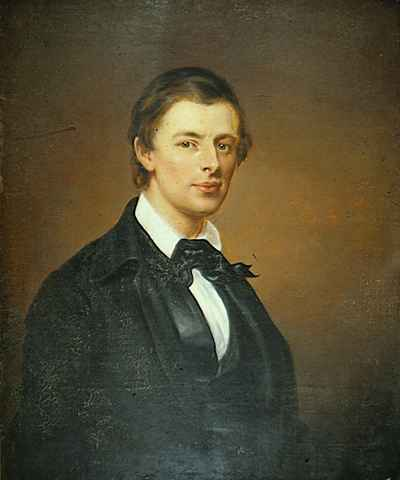
Portrait of John Banvard by Anna Mary Howitt

The portrait painter and miniaturist Margaret Gillies, who had contributed many portraits to the exhibitions of the Royal Academy of Arts during the 1830s and 1840s, including a portrait of Mary Howitt in 1847, exhibited a portrait of Anna Mary at the Royal Academy in 1849. Gillies was very close to the Howitt family, and was an important mentor for Anna Mary.

She illustrated many of her mother's books, including The Children's Year (1847), which chronicles a full year (1845–1846) in the lives of Mary Howitt's two youngest children, Charlton (Herbert) and Margaret (Meggy). Anna Mary also appeared as 'Mary' in this story.

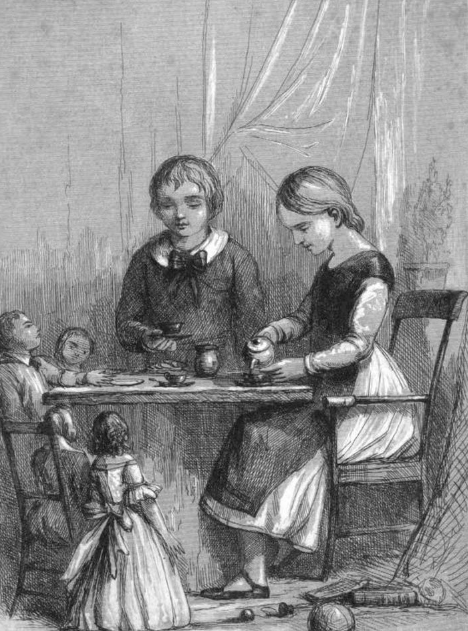
An illustration for her mother's book The Children's Year

In the meantime, her male fellow students began their studies at the Royal Academy Schools. Being a woman, she could not apply for admission and she had to seek other alternatives to gain access to life classes.

In 1850, Howitt went unchaperoned with her fellow artist Jane Benham to Munich, where she studied for two years under Wilhelm von Kaulbach. She published articles about this stay in the British periodicals Household Words, Ladies' Companion and The Athenaeum. In 1853 she published the book An Art-Student in Munich (1853). The book was a success in the UK and the US.

The New York Times (11 May 1854) wrote about An Art-Student in Munich: "All that is peculiar to Munich, – its museums, galleries, festivals, and works of art, – or to German life, whether in high or low degree, and still more to the cultivation of the artist, is told in these pages with a beautiful earnestness and a naive simplicity, that have a talismanic effect upon the reader. It is one of those sunny works which leave a luminous trail behind them in the reader's memory."

Shortly after her return in London, she also published her serialized novella The Sisters in Art (1852) in The Illustrated Exhibitor and Magazine of Art. Her idea of a sisterhood of women artists was formalised in a story of three women artists who create a supportive community and join forces to open an art academy for women. Howitt and her art sisters were in fact uniting in private evening drawing classes, held in the library of Eliza Fox's father (the prominent Unitarian minister William Johnson Fox) to draw from the undraped model.

Howitt, at this stage in life, was subjected to two influences, "connected on the one hand with the social and publishing circles of her parents, the hard-working pillars of the London literary establishment, and on the other hand with a group of forward-looking, feminist women of her own age." The younger group of her associates consisted of the later Langham Place feminists, notably her close friend the artist Barbara Leigh Smith. Howitt and Leigh Smith also became more part of the Pre-Raphaelite circle by joining The Folio Sketching club.

Howitt made her exhibition debut at the National Institution of Fine Arts in 1854 with Margaret returning from the fountain or Gretchen at the fountain, a painting inspired by Goethe's Faust. She had begun painting this picture after she ended her engagement with her fellow artist Edward La Trobe Bateman in the summer of 1853. This was shortly after she received a letter from her father William, who was staying with Bateman in Australia, indicating that Bateman was 'unreliable' and not suitable as her future husband. Anna Mary acted upon this letter and chose as a subject Margaret, who was tortured by self-accusation after she had been seduced by Faust. She painted it in outdoor sunlight, and according to her friend and fellow artist Dante Gabriel Rossetti, "it was a most difficult task, and a very good picture". This painting was first refused by the board of the British Institution, a decision which outraged Rossetti. It is likely that Rossetti advised Howitt to exhibit this painting in the National Institution at the Portland Gallery, where he had exhibited his Ecce Ancilla Domini! in 1850. This venue was more accessible to women artists who suffered discrimination by other art venues. In a letter Rossetti addressed to Ford Madox Brown, dated 30 March 1854, he reported the success of Howitt's painting of Margaret. Rossetti had heard from his brother and art critic William Michael Rossetti that the painting had been "kicking up quite a great row", indicating that it had been "much noticed and admired".

Although her exhibition debut was generally praised in the British periodical press, it also received patronising criticism. William Michael Rossetti wrote the most favorable review in The Spectator on 18 March. Although he indicated some "executive deficiencies", he called her work "the most remarkable contribution… and noticeable alike for delicate depth of feeling and for conscientious study." He welcomed her as a Pre-Raphaelite artist by highlighting her "unmistakable adherence to the English Preraphaelite practice, evidenced in the unconventional simplicity of the figure, the rendering of broad out-door sunshine, and the affectionate care bestowed upon the accessories." William Michael concluded that "It would be difficult to recall a first picture of more assured promise." This concluding view was shared by the art critic of The Art Journal, who stated in the review, written on 1 April, that Miss Howitt not only "produced a picture that would do honour to maturer age and larger experience," but the art critic also foresaw a promising career, as it was "safe to auger her future eminence in Art and professional distinction!"

The most mixed and patronising review appeared in the influential London journal The Athenaeum on the same day as Rossetti's review in The Spectator. It was probably written by the primary fine arts reviewer of the Athenaeum during the mid-nineteenth century, Frank Stone. Stone had previously singled out the Pre-Raphaelite Brethern, most notably Millais, Hunt and Rossetti, for a personal attack and publicly ridiculed their works in the early 1850s. Although he saw "head and heart work in this little poem of a picture", he said she was an aspiring female history painter who, according to Stone, showed "more heart than women usually show to the sorrows of their own sex, and painted by a hand with the firm delicacy of a man's execution." In short, he questioned implicitly whether the painting had been executed by Howitt herself. In his conclusion, he indicated the immense popularity of Howitt's painting by stating that her "able and promising picture was immediately sold, – and might have been sold many times over on the day of the private view." This review gave Howitt a blow. She confessed in a letter to Barbara Leigh Smith that she became afraid of using her favourite colour, green.

The success of her debut led to two commissions, one from the lady Angela Burdett-Coutts. She commissioned a portrait of Beatrice Portinari, the great, unrequited love and lifelong muse of the Italian Renaissance poet Dante Alighieri. Besides the commissions and the works she prepared for the exhibitions, Howitt also made sensitive sketches and drawings of people who posed for her.

In the early 1850s, she met Elizabeth Siddal, Rossetti's muse, model and pupil. Siddal, who had posed for the Pre-Raphaelite Brethern, became an artist, painter and poet, in her own right. Anna Mary Howitt, Barbara Leigh Smith and Bessie Rayner Parkes became highly intrigued by this young natural-born talent whom they regarded as "a genius". Siddal's frail health was a concern for the Howitt family, who sent her to their family doctor, James John Garth Wilkinson. His diagnosis of scoliosis led Leigh Smith to help organise a convalescent stay for Miss Siddal (or Lizzie, as they called her) in Hastings. Rossetti had asked for help because he realised that his beloved Lizzie was "under a ban of having been a model" and wanted her to be around "Ladies".

Howitt, Leigh Smith, and Parkes wanted "to keep her self esteem from sinking" and took her down to the Sussex coast. On May 8 1854, Howitt, Leigh Smith and Rossetti all drew Lizzie with irises in her hair during their stay at Scalands Farm, the country house of Leigh Smith at Robertsbridge. Iris was the goddess of the rainbow and the messenger between heaven and earth. Howitt's sensitive portrait captures the fragile spirit of Lizzie, who lowered her eyes when Howitt was drawing her. Howitt and Leigh Smith also went on painting expeditions while they were staying at Scalands Farm during May 1854.

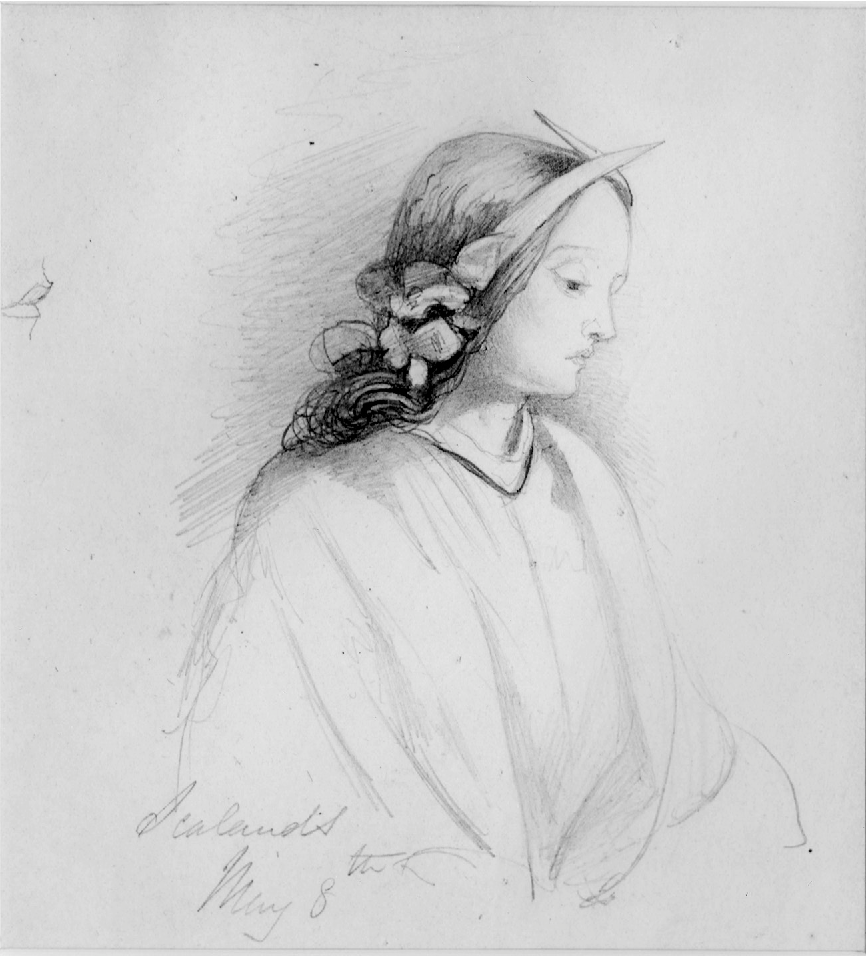
Elizabeth Siddal by Anna Mary Howitt

Howitt gave Leigh Smith valuable instruction in oil painting. During this stay, topics of women's rights were also discussed, such as women's education and married property.

In the winter of 1854, she invited an 82-year old crippled beggar, a former soldier and sailor, who knocked at her door, inside her parental home. While he was warming at the fire she listened to his life story and drew his pencil portrait. This portrait with a manuscript narrative shows a bearded old man with a handkerchief tied round his head, dated and initialled.

In 1855 she exhibited two other paintings. The first, The Sensitive Plant, in response to Shelley's poem 'The Sensitive Plant' and later called The Lady, was shown at the same venue, the National eExhibition of the Portland Gallery (previously known as the Free Exhibition). It was a diptych. One painting showed a magical lady holding a basket of flowers on her head in a verdant garden. This was painted in an oval, surrounded by a border of spring flowers. The other painting showed the same lady lying dead on the ground, discovered by a mother and a child in a garden in decay. This oval was surrounded by a border of poisonous flowers and mushrooms in fall or winter.

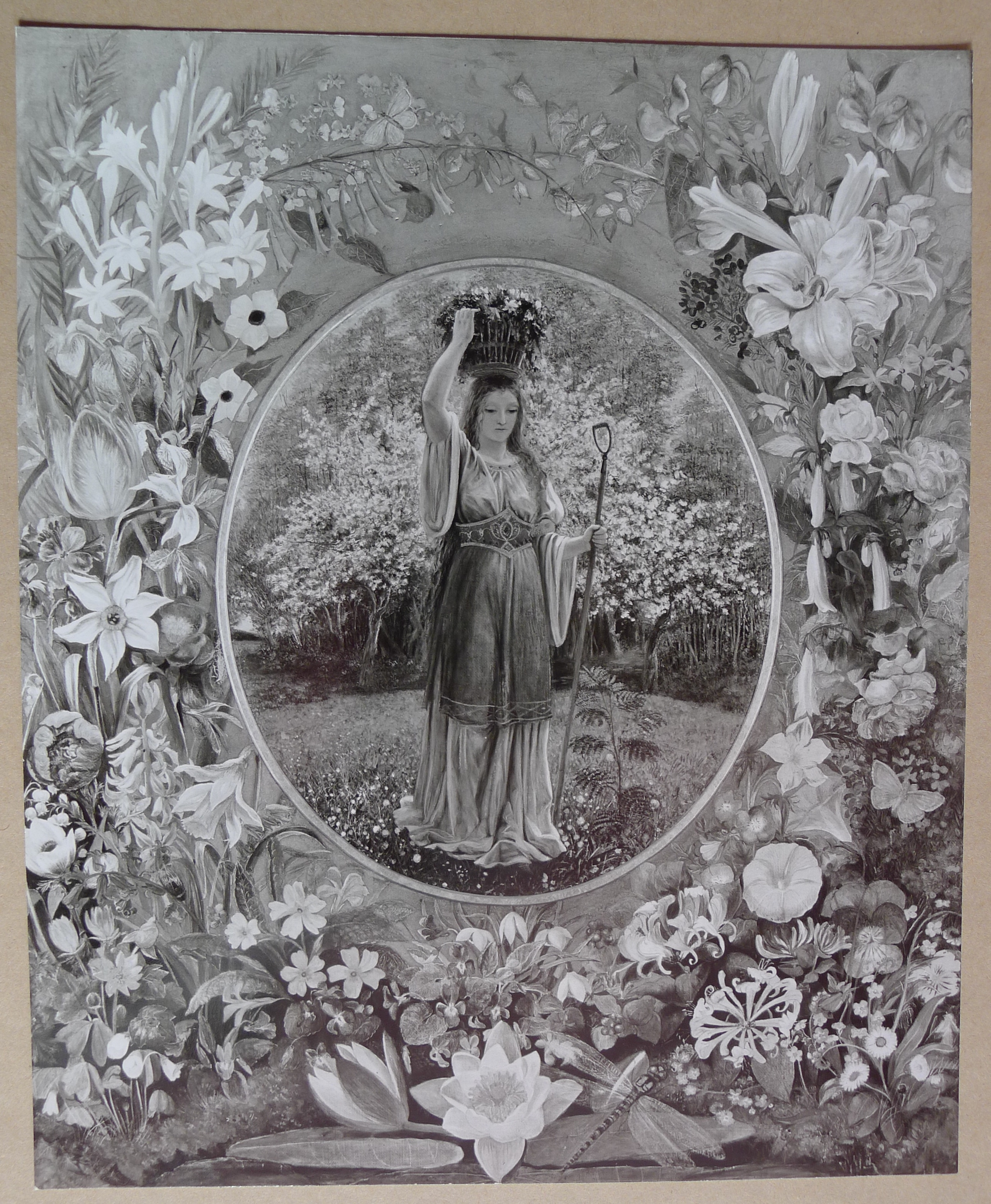
The Sensitive Plant (Spring), photograph by Julian Hartnoll

Her second painting, The Castaway, exhibited at the Royal Academy, pictured a homeless flower girl with a basket of unsold roses and a sheaf of despised lilies. The Castaway was hung above the line, so she drew less critical attention than other artists.

In 1855, she formed a Married Women's Property Committee (MWPC) with her mother Mary Howitt, Barbara Leigh Smith, Eliza Fox, Bessie Rayner Parkes and several other professional women artists. They collected signatures for a petition to support a Married Women's Property Bill that was presented in Parliament in March 1856. Through a chain of letters sent all over the country, over 26.000 signatures were gathered. According to Amice Lee, the great-niece of Mary Howitt "collected hundreds of signatures which Octavia Hill, a girl of eighteen, coming over the fields with her band of ragged-school children, helped her to paste together." Their struggle to obtain these property rights would eventually lead to the Married Women's Property Act 1870.

The family accounts record her distress over criticism from John Ruskin of her ambitious painting of Boadicea or Boudica, which was rejected by the Royal Academy but accepted at the Chrystal Palace exhibition in 1856. Ruskin sent his verdict in a patronising private letter: "What do you know about Boadicea? Leave such subjects alone and paint me a pheasant's wing." This crushed her spirit and led to a serious mental breakdown, probably also a psychosis. Her aspiration to be a recognized history painter was denied.

Howitt's breakdown contributed to her retreat from the conventional art world and her turn to spirit drawings, which she published for the first time under the pseudonym 'Comfort' in Camilla Dufour Crosland's Light in the Valley: My Experiences of Spiritualism (1857).

Her sunset view painting From a window exhibited at the Society of Female Artists, in 1858 may have been her symbolic message to the hard art world. This society, founded in 1855 for women artists, made it possible for women who had great difficulty in obtaining a public showing of their works and a proper art education to find a public venue.

She arose in her writing, spirit drawings and women's rights activism. In the shortlived weekly newspaper Bell's News, Howitt continued to address the difficult positions of women in serial novels like The House of the Goldstones and Helen Hardcastle by the end of 1856 and beginning of 1857. The main character of The House of the Goldstones, Clara Goldstone, a young aspiring history painter, fights for a recognition of her biological father, who had disinherited her because he assumed she was not his legitimate daughter.

== Shared spiritualism and continued activism ==
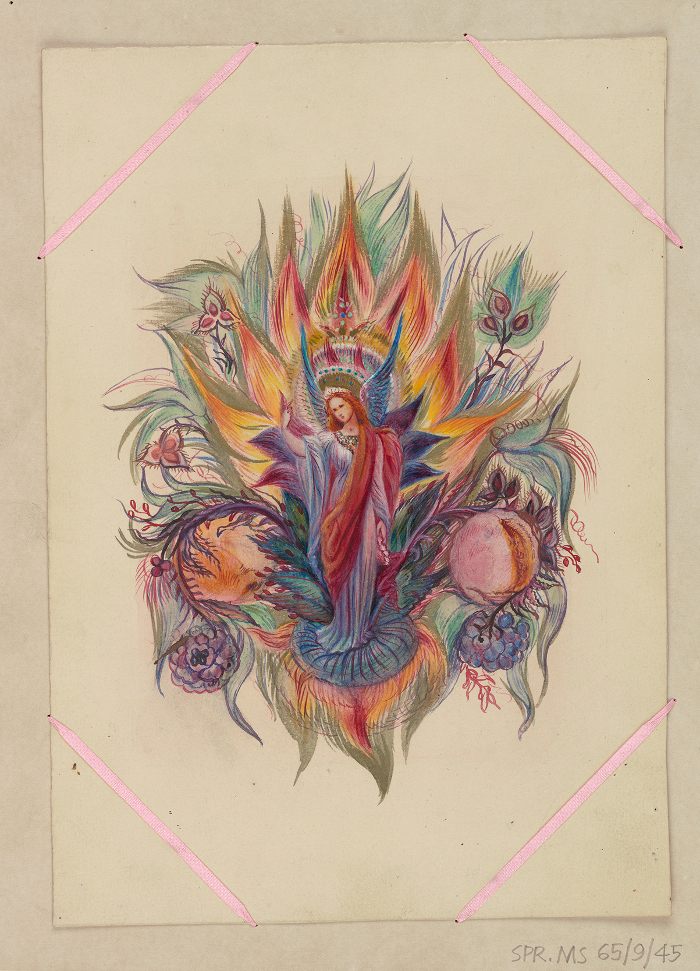
Spirit drawing by Howitt

In 1859, Howitt married a childhood friend, fellow spiritualist and writer, Alaric Alfred Watts. He consistently supported and shared her concerns throughout her life. Unlike other women of her era, she addressed herself as Mrs Howitt-Watts, holding on to her maiden name.

The couple held dinner parties and séances to advance the woman's cause. Howitt and her mother were among the first 1,500 women who petitioned for women's suffrage in 1866. Together with her mother, she continued the campaigns for votes for women and married women's property rights. They both contributed to the pamphlet Opinions of women on women's suffrage published by the Central Committee of the National Society for Women's Suffrage in 1879, pleading for votes for women.

Watts and Howitt moved to Cheyne Walk in Chelsea, three doors away from Dante Gabriel Rossetti, her lifelong friend.

Howitt continued to publish regularly, most often in the spiritualist press. With Watts, she co-authored Aurora: a Volume of Verse (1884). Her Pioneers of the Spiritual Reformation (1883) consisted of biographical sketches of the German poet Justinus Kerner and of her father William Howitt. Her spirit drawings are exceptional in their power and reveal her Pre-Raphaelite training. Their religious character is obvious, showing angels, the divine mother and child, and other such themes. She was seeking a female interpretation of religion, and foremost of the divine motherhood.

Her marriage remained childless, but Howitt always wanted to be in the presence of children, becoming "a mother" to poor children when she was helping in soup kitchens and by teaching these children in later life.

Anna Mary Watts died of diphtheria in 1884 at Mair am Hof in Teodone (Brunico), during a visit to her mother in Tyrol (since 1919 part of Italy).

== Australian connection ==
She remained close to her brother, Alfred William Howitt, who had emigrated to Australia, where he became an explorer and pioneering anthropologist. Acting as his de facto agent in England, she secured equipment, vetted texts, and maintained academic ties on his behalf.

== Legacy ==
Though the whereabouts of her surviving oil paintings are still not known, a large number of Howitt's "spirit drawings" — images originated without her conscious control — remain in the archives of the College of Psychic Studies in London.

Howitt was an inspiration to the artist medium Georgiana Houghton.

With the expanding public interest in spirit-driven artists such as Emma Kunz and Hilma af Klint, Howitt's drawings are currently receiving greater academic attention. The largest exhibition of Anna Mary Howitt Watts' work to date was 'The Medium is the Message', curated by Jacqui Mcintosh, at the College of Psychic Studies in 2025.

== Publications ==
- An Art Student in Munich (1853)
- A School of Life (1855)
- Aurora: A Volume of Verse (1875)
- The Pioneers of the Spiritual Reformation (1883)

== External resources ==
- Rachel Oberter, Spiritualism and the Visual Imagination in Victorian Britain, PhD dissertation, Yale University, 2007
- Black-and-white reproduction of AMH's 1849 portrait of fellow artist John Banvard (1815–1891): Retrieved 9 July 2011.
- The text of An Art-Student in Munich online: Retrieved 9 July 2011.
- The text of The Children's Year by Mary Howitt, illustrated by her daughter Anna Mary Howitt: Retrieved 9 July 2011.
- A chapter on Anna Mary Howitt's travels in Munich in Heidi Liedke: The Experience of Idling in Victorian Travel Texts, 1850–1901. Palgrave Macmillan, 2018 Retrieved 17 August 2018.
- https://www.royalacademy.org.uk/art-artists/exhibition-catalogue/ra-sec-vol81-1849
