= Richard Howitt (poet) =

- Born: 1799; Heanor in Derbyshire
- Died: 1869; Edingley, Nottinghamshire
- Occupation: Poet

Richard Howitt (1799–1869) was a British poet.

== Life ==
Howitt was born in Heanor in Derbyshire in 1799, was the son of Thomas Howitt and Phoebe Tantum. William Howitt, the writer, was his elder brother and Mary Howitt was William's wife. His younger brother was Godfrey Howitt. He spent his earlier years as a pharmacist in Nottingham, at first in partnership with his brother William, but finally on his own account.

He was an ardent lover of literature, and published in 1830 a volume of poems entitled Antediluvian Sketches. This was highly praised and was followed in 1840 by the Gipsy King and other poems. Many of Howitt's poems appeared first in Tait's Magazine and William Dearden's Miscellany.

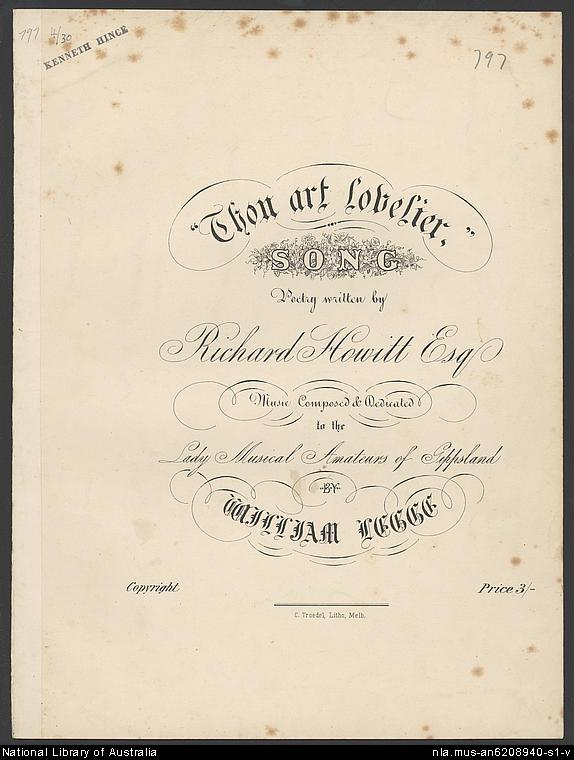
'Richards poetry set to music'

Towards the end of 1839, Richard, in company with his brother, Dr. Godfrey Howitt, emigrated to Australia arriving in Port Phillip in 1840. He farmed on the Heidelberg Road until his return to England in 1844 and published his experiences in Impressions of Australia Felix during Four Years' Residence in that Colony, Notes of a Voyage round the World, Australian Poems/ &c., 1845. This miscellany of prose and verse was described by Leigh Hunt as 'full of genuine pictures of nature, animate and inanimate.'

After a stay in Nottingham, Howitt retired to Edingley and published in 1868 a last volume of verse, Wasp's Honey, or Poetic Gold and Gems of Poetic Thought.

He died at Edingley on 5 February 1869, and was buried in the Friends' cemetery at Mansfield. Christopher North says of him, in the 'Noctes Ambrosianae/ Richard has true poetic feeling, and no small poetic power.

One of Richard poems, "Thou art Lovelier", was set to music in 1870 by William Legge.
