= William Howitt =

English history writer (1792–1879)

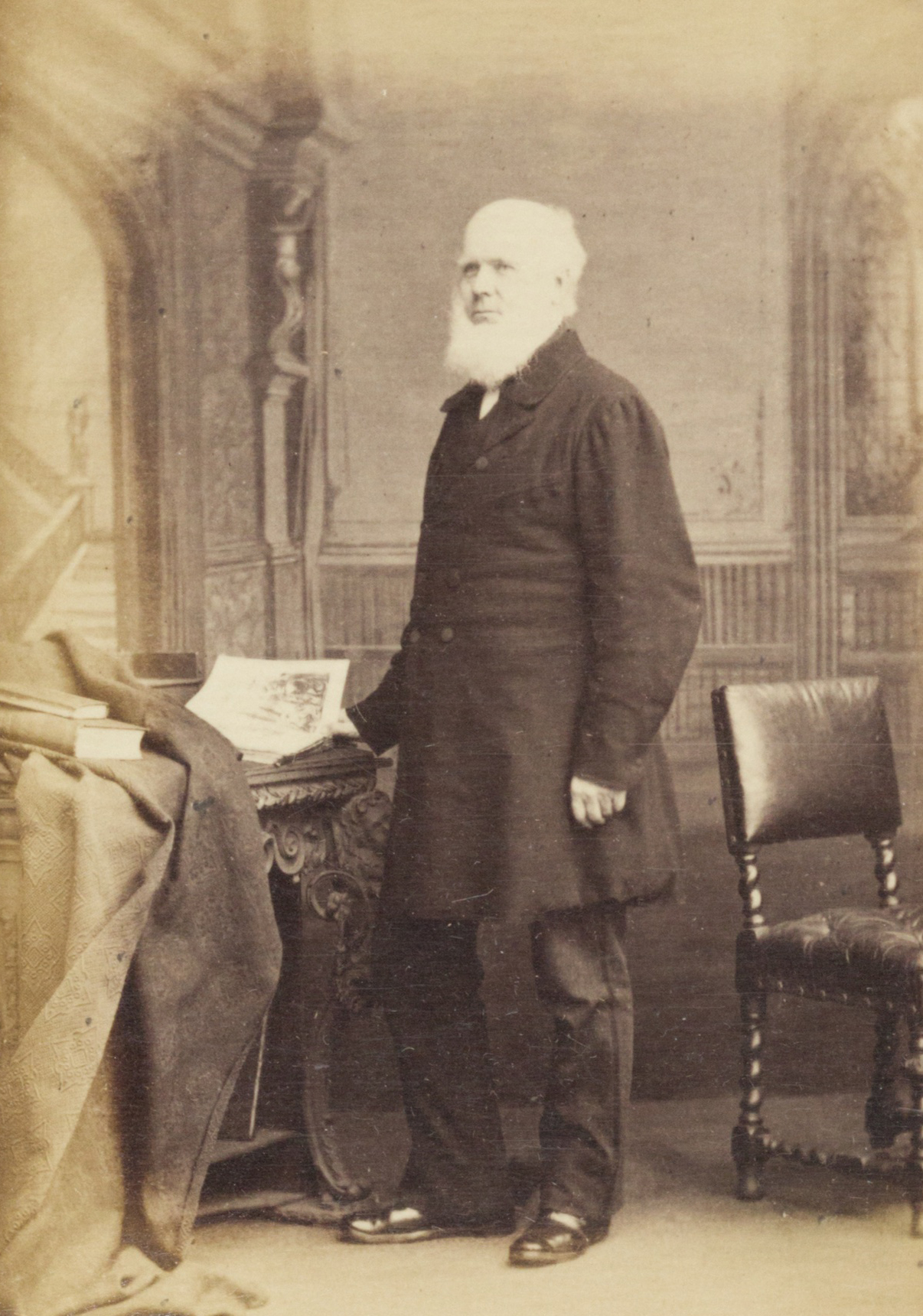
- Portrait of Howitt, c. 1863, by Ernest Edwards
- Born: 18 December 1792; Heanor, Derbyshire, England
- Died: 3 March 1879 (aged 86); Rome, Kingdom of Italy
- Education: Friends public school at Ackworth
- Occupation: Writer
- Spouse: Mary Botham
- Children: 4, including Anna Mary and Alfred

William Howitt (18 December 1792 – 3 March 1879), was a prolific English writer on history and other subjects. Howitt Primary Community School in Heanor, Derbyshire, is named after him and his wife.

== Biography ==
=== In England ===
Howitt was born in Heanor, Derbyshire. His parents were Quakers, and he was educated at the Friends public school at Ackworth, Yorkshire. His younger brothers were Richard and Godfrey whom he helped tutor. In 1814, William Howitt published a poem on the Influence of Nature and Poetry on National Spirit. In 1821, he married Mary Botham, who, like himself, was a Quaker and a poet. William and Mary Howitt collaborated throughout a long literary career; the first of their joint productions was The Forest Minstrels and other Poems (1821).

In 1831, William Howitt produced a work that naturally resulted from his habits of observation and his genuine love of nature. It was a history of the changes in the face of the outside world in the different months of the year, and was entitled The Book of the Seasons, or the Calendar of Nature (1831). His Popular History of Priestcraft (1833) won him the favour of active Liberals and the office of alderman in Nottingham, where the Howitts had made their home.

They moved to Esher in 1837 and became friends with Elizabeth Gaskell and her husband. In 1838, the publication of his Colonization and Christianity, which was later quoted approvingly by Karl Marx in Capital, Volume I, marked a significant moment. In 1840, they went to Heidelberg, primarily for the education of their children, and remained in Germany for two years. In 1841, William Howitt, using the pseudonym Dr Cornelius, produced The Student Life of Germany, the first of a series of works on German social life and institutions. Mary Howitt devoted herself to Scandinavian literature, and between 1842 and 1863 she translated the novels of Frederika Bremer and many of the stories of Hans Christian Andersen.

In 1847 Howitt published the 'Homes and Haunts of the most Eminent British Poets' with the publisher Richard Bently. The Preface to the Second Edition dated 1847, and referring to careful revision of the work is included in the third edition, published by George Routledge & Sons in 1877, suggesting there were either two editions in 1847, or the first edition was earlier. With her husband Mary wrote, in 1852, The Literature and Romance of Northern Europe.

=== In Australia ===
In September 1852, Howitt, with two of his sons, arrived in Melbourne, in colonial Australia, where he visited his youngest brother and visited the newly discovered goldfields. The results of two years in the colony were A Boy's Adventures in the Wilds of Australia (1854), Land, Labour and Gold; or, Two Years in Victoria (1855) and Tallangetta, the Squatter's Home (1857). His eldest son, Alfred William, remained in Australia as an anthropologist, explorer and naturalist and was known for leading the Victorian Relief Expedition, which set out to establish the fate of the ill-fated expedition by Burke and Wills.

=== Return to Europe ===
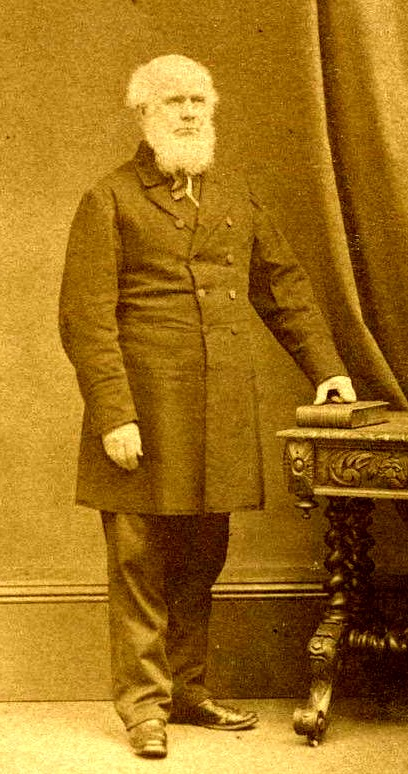
William Howitt (Source: British Library)

On William's return to England, he settled at Highgate and resumed his indefatigable book-making. From 1856 to 1862 he was engaged on Cassell's Illustrated History of England, and from 1861 to 1864 he and his wife worked at the Ruined Abbeys and Castles of Great Britain. The Howitts had left the Society of Friends in 1847, and became interested in Spiritualism. In 1863 he published The History of the Supernatural in all Ages and Nations, and in all Churches, Christian and Pagan, demonstrating a Universal Faith. He added his own conclusions from a practical examination of the higher phenomena through a course of seven years. His eldest daughter Anna Mary paid tribute to his foundational work as a spiritualist and wrote his biography The Pioneers of the Spiritual Reformation in 1883.

From 1870 onwards Howitt spent the summers in Tyrol and the winters in Rome, where he died. In 1880 Mary built a house (which is still standing) in the spa town of Meran in South Tyrol (then part of Austria) and from then on divided her time between Rome and Meran. Mary was much affected by William's death, and in 1882 she joined the Roman Catholic Church, towards which she had been gradually moving during her connection with spiritualism. She died at Rome on 30 January 1888.

== Legacy ==
The Howitts are remembered for their untiring efforts to provide wholesome and instructive literature. Mary's autobiography was edited by her daughter, Margaret, in 1889.

William Howitt wrote approximately fifty books, and together with his wife's publications, inclusive of translations, they number over a hundred.

== Notable works ==
- A Popular History of Priestcraft in all Ages and Nations, 1833
- Calendar of Nature, 1836
- The Rural Life of England, 1838
- Colonization and Christianity: A Popular History of the Treatment of the Natives by the Europeans in all their Colonies, 1838
- Visits to Remarkable Places: Old Halls, Battle Fields and Scenes Illustrative …, 1840–42 (Two series)
- The Student-Life of Germany: By William Howitt, from the Unpublished MS. of Dr. Cornelius, 1841
- The Rural and Domestic Life of Germany, 1842
- The Life and Adventures of Jack of the Mill: commonly called Lord Othmill; created, for his eminent services, Baron Waldeck, and knight of Kitcottie; a fireside story; with forty illustrations on wood by G. F. Sargent, 1844
- Madam Dorrington of the Dene: the story of a life, 1850
- The Literature and Romance of Northern Europe: Constituting a Complete History of the Literature of Sweden, Denmark, Norway, and Iceland, …, 1852
- Land, Labour, and Gold; or, Two Years in Victoria, 1855
- A Boy's Adventures in the Wilds of Australia; or, Herbert's Note-Book, 1855
- The Man of the People, 1860
- The History of the Supernatural in all Ages and Nations, and in all Churches, Christian and Pagan; Demonstrating a Universal Faith, 1863
- The History of Discovery in Australia, Tasmania, and New Zealand, 1865
- The Mad War-Planet; And Other Poems, 1871
- Homes and Haunts of the most eminent British Poets, 1877

As translator (incomplete list)

- The Wonderful History of Peter Schlemihl by Adelbert von Chamisso, 1844, LCCN 06-23327
- The History of Magic by Joseph Ennemoser, 2 vols., 1854 – interior images at Internet Archive; (1970 edition, LCCN 71-118599)

Subtitle: To which is added an Appendix of the most remarkable and best authenticated stories of Apparitions, Dreams, Second Sight, Somnambulism, Predictions, Divination, Witchcraft, Vampires, Fairies, Table-turning, and Spirit-rapping. Selected by Mary Howitt. [Editor's Preface closes "M. H."]
