= Gypsy Kings =

Gypsy Kings may refer to:

- King of the Gypsies, an informal title
- Gipsy Kings, a French musical group
  - Gipsy Kings (album), 1987

== See also ==
- Gypsy King (disambiguation)
