= Alaric Alexander Watts =

British poet and journalist (1797–1864)

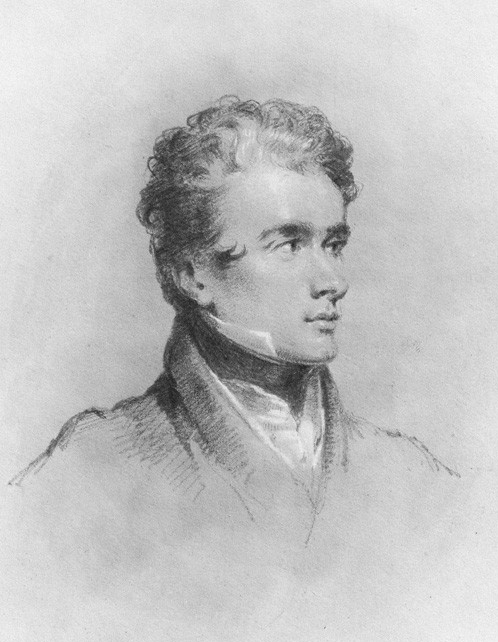
Alaric Alexander Watts by William Brockedon, 1825

Alaric Alexander Watts (16 March 1797 – 5 April 1864) was a British poet and journalist, born in London. His life was dedicated to newspaper creation and editing, and he was seen as a conservative writer. His newspaper ventures failed and led him to bankruptcy, until he received a pension from his friend, Lord Aberdeen.

He may now be best remembered for his alliterative poem "The Siege of Belgrade", which begins with a much-quoted couplet:

An Austrian army, awfully arrayed,
Boldly by battery besieged Belgrade.

== Life as a journalist ==
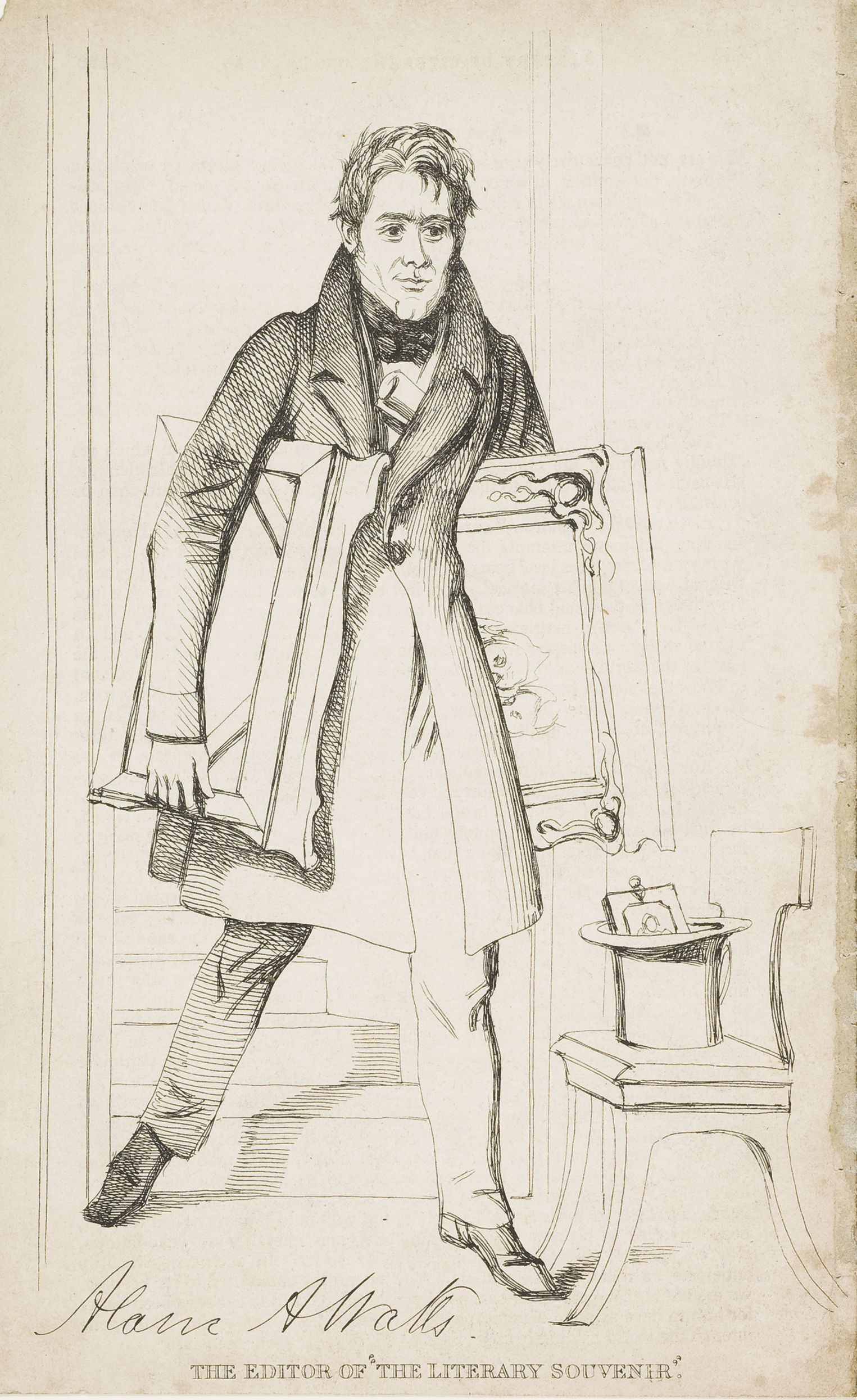
Alaric Watts ("the editor of The Literary Souvenir")

Alaric Watts was the son of John Mosley Watts and grandson of William Watts, a Leicester physician of repute. After leaving school he made his living as a teacher for a short time, and in 1818–19 was part of the staff of the New Monthly Magazine in London. At about the same time he became a contributor to the Literary Gazette.

In 1822, leaving his position at the Gazette, he was made editor of the Leeds Intelligencer (1822–23), in the columns of which he was one of the first to advocate measures for protecting workers in factories against accidents from machinery (see occupational safety). In 1823 he published his first volume of verse, Poetical Sketches, and in 1824 he became the editor of the Literary Souvenir (till 1838), of which he also became the proprietor two years later. During his ownership he secured the co-operation of some of the most famous men of letters of that period. In 1825 he went to Manchester as editor of the Manchester Courier, a position which he resigned a year later. He bought The Literary Magnet around December 1825, first making an unnamed "very clever young literary friend" the editor, before taking over as the anonymous editor from July 1826 to December 1827. Under his ownership, The Literary Magnet changed its emphasis from prose to poetry, and he managed to get contributions from a number of popular poets of the day, including John Clare, Mary Howitt, Thomas Hood, Felicia Hemans, and his brother-in-law Jeremiah Holmes Wiffen.

In 1827 he assisted in founding the Standard as a sub-editor, while the first editor was Stanley Lees Giffard; and in 1833 he started the United Service Gazette, which he edited for eight years. In 1839 he helped Lady Bulwer with a manuscript of Cheveley and during that time he offered her to stay some time at his cottage. During the same year he returned to the Standard as an editor and took a job at the Morning Herald where he worked until 1846.

== Later life ==
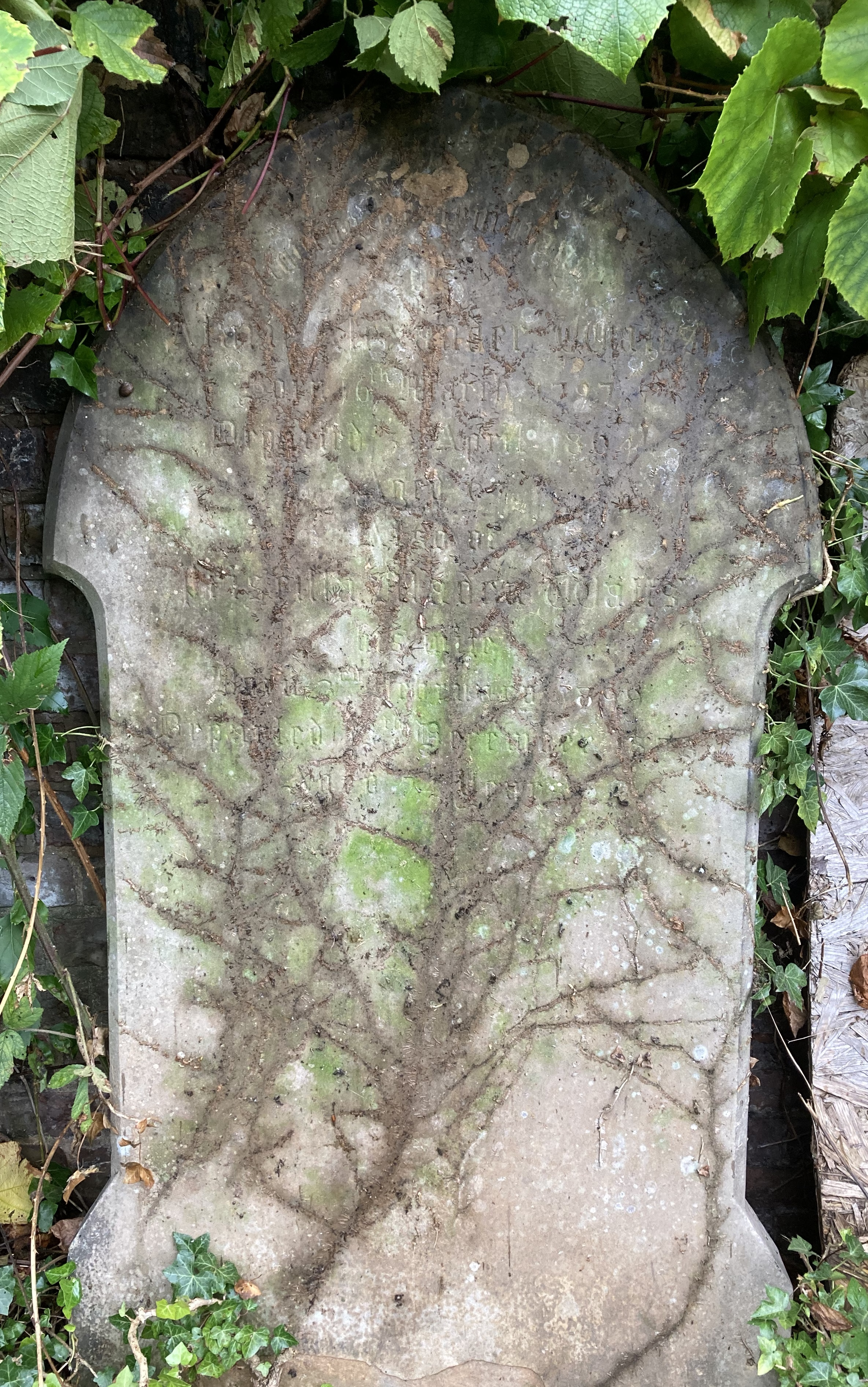
Grave of Alaric Watts in Highgate Cemetery

Watts met and married Priscilla "Zillah" Maden Watts (née Wiffen) in the early 1820s. The couple had a child, Alaric Alfred, in 1825. Mrs Watts also published and wrote for newspapers and magazines like The New Year's Gift and Juvenile Souvenir (1829–36) until she died in 1873.

Watts was involved with a number of provincial Conservative newspapers which were not financially successful. In 1848, he was sentenced for some time in debtors' prison; in 1850 he declared bankruptcy. In 1854, Lord Aberdeen came to his rescue by awarding Watts a civil service pension. In 1856 he was back to editing, publishing the first issue of Men of the Time.

Watts died in London on 5 April 1864 and is buried in Highgate Cemetery, against the northern boundary wall (above the catacombs). His poems were collected as Lyrics of the Heart and published in 1850. In 1867 a collection of his poems was published in a volume titled The Laurel and the Lyre.
