= Joseph Ennemoser =

South Tyrolean physician

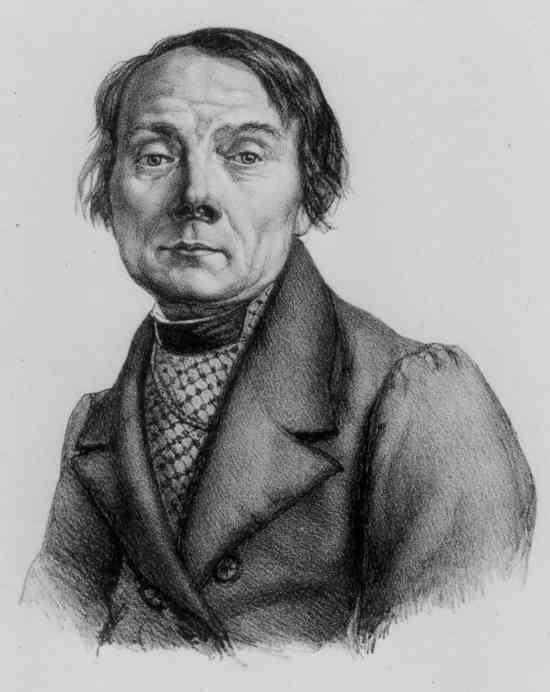

Joseph Ennemoser (15 November 1787 – 19 September 1854) was a South Tyrolean medical doctor and stubborn late proponent of Franz Mesmer's theories of animal magnetism. He became known to English readers through Mary Howitt's translation of his History of Magic (1819, 1844, tr. 1854).

== Biography ==
Ennemoser, the child of poor parents, was born in Egghof bei Rabenstein (today Moos in Passeier, South Tyrol, Italy) and raised by his grandfather. He attended high school in Merano and Trento and, from 1806, studied medicine in Innsbruck. On the outbreak of war in 1809, he became a secretary to Andreas Hofer and later continued his studies in Erlangen and Vienna. In 1812, he moved to Berlin, where he met Christian Friedrich von Petersdorff and Ludwig Adolf Wilhelm von Lützow. In the summer of 1812, he went to London together with several Tyroleans to appeal for support in the fight against Napoleon. From 1813, he was in the Lützow Free Corps as an active leader of a group of Tyrolean marksmen who gained fame at Lauenburg and Jülich. In September 1813, he was promoted to second lieutenant.

After the First Treaty of Paris in 1814, he completed his studies in Berlin and became a supporter of Franz Anton Mesmer and his theory of animal magnetism. In 1819, he became a professor of medicine in Bonn, leaving in 1837 for Innsbruck and then, in 1841, settling in Munich, where he earned a great reputation as a "magnetic physician." He died in Egern (now Rottach-Egern) by Lake Tegernsee in southern Germany.

A Viennese street, the Ennemosergasse, was named after him in 1955.

== Selected works ==
- De Montium Influxu in Valetudinem Hominum, Vitae Genus et Morbos. Dissertatio Inauguralis Medica (Vom Einfluss der Berge auf die Gesundheit der Menschen, auf ihre Lebensweise und ihre Krankheiten). Berlin 1816.
- Der Magnetismus nach der allseitigen Beziehung seines Wesens, seiner Erscheinungen, Anwendung und Enträthselung in einer geschichtlichen Entwickelung von allen Zeiten und bei allen Völkern. Leipzig 1819.
- Ueber die nähere Wechselwirkung des Leibes und der Seele, mit anthropologischen Untersuchungen über den Mörder Adolph Moll. Habicht, Bonn 1825.
- Der Magnetismus in seiner geschichtlichen Entwickelung (Leipzig 1819), from the 2nd edition with the title Geschichte des thierischen Magnetismus. Bd.: 1 Geschichte der Magie. Leipzig 1844. Facsimile edition, Sändig, Wiesbaden 1966.
- Historisch-psychologische Untersuchungen über den Ursprung und das Wesen der menschlichen Seele überhaupt, und über die Beseelung des Kindes insbesondere. Bonn 1824, 2. Aufl., Stuttgart 1851.
- Anthropologische Ansichten zur bessern Kenntnis des Menschen. Bonn 1828.
- Der Magnetismus im Verhältnis zur Natur und Religion (mit einem Anhang über das Tischrücken). Stuttgart 1842, 2. Aufl. 1853.
- Was ist die Cholera und wie kann man sich vor ihr am sichersten verwahren? Nebst Angabe der bewährtesten Heilung derselben. 2. Auflg. Stuttgart 1848.
- Der Geist des Menschen in der Natur oder die Psychologie in Uebereinstimmung mit der Naturkunde. Cotta, Stuttgart 1849.
- Anleitung zur Mesmerschen Praxis. Stuttgart 1852. Neudruck der Ausg. 1852, Kuballe, Osnabrück 1984.
- Das Horoskop in der Weltgeschichte. München 1860. Reprinted with an autobiographical fragment: Mein Leben and extra material and commentary by Hermann Haase. Pflüger Verlag, München 1924.
- Untersuchungen über den Ursprung und das Wesen der menschlichen Seele. Including Mein Leben. Verlag Die Pforte, Basel 1980. ISBN 3-7725-0184-2.

== Bibliography ==
- "Ennemoser Josef". In: Österreichisches Biographisches Lexikon 1815–1950 (ÖBL). Vol. 1, Austrian Academy of Sciences, Vienna 1957, p. 254 f. (Direct links to "p. 254", "p. 255")
- August Hirsch (1877). "Ennemoser, Joseph" . Allgemeine Deutsche Biographie (in German). Vol. 6. Leipzig: Duncker & Humblot. pp. 150–151.
- Jakob Bremm: Der Tiroler Joseph Ennemoser: 1787 - 1854; ein Lehrer des tierischen Magnetismus und vergessener Vorkämpfer des entwicklungsgeschichtlichen Denkens in der Medizin. Fischer, Jena 1930.
- Karl Wilhelm Schmitz: Der Tierische Magnetismus als Teilaspekt der Romantischen Naturphilosophie des frühen 19. Jahrhunderts im Lebenswerk des Tirolers Joseph Ennemoser. Univ., Diss., Bonn 1995.
- Ellen Hastaba, Siegfried de Rachewiltz (Hrsg.): Für Freiheit, wahrheit und Recht! Joseph Ennemoser und Jakob Philipp Fallmerayer. Tirol von 1809 bis 1848/49. Schlern-Schriften 349, Innsbruck 2009.
- Monika Fink-Lang: Der Arzt und Magnetiseur Joseph Ennemoser. Vom Wunder des menschlichen Geistes. DAMALS Das Magazin für Geschichte 4/ 2010.
- Siegfried de Rachewiltz (Hrsg.): Joseph Ennemoser. Leben und Werk des Freiheitskämpfers, Mediziners und Magnetiseurs (1787 - 1854). Haymon, Innsbruck 2010, (= Schriftenreihe historische Quellen zur Kulturgeschichte Tirol Bd 5).
