= Mulgrave Castle (1813 ship) =

UK merchant ship 1813–1825

History

United Kingdom
- Name: Mulgrave Castle
- Namesake: Mulgrave Castle
- Builder: William James & Robert Tindall, Scarborough, for own account
- Launched: 21 October 1813
- Fate: Wrecked 1825

General characteristics
- Tons burthen: 404, or 405, or 440 (bm)
- Armament: 6 guns

Mulgrave Castle was launched in 1813 at Scarborough and spent much of her career sailing between England and India under a license from the British East India Company (EIC). In 1816 she was the subject of a notable incident at Cape Verde. She was wrecked in 1825.

== Career ==
Although Mulgrave Castle was launched in 1813, she first appeared in Lloyd's Register in 1815 with J. Ralph, master, Tindal & Co., owners, and trade London–Jamaica.

A gale on 9 August 1815 dismasted Mulgrave Castle as she was returning to London from Jamaica. On the 13th Valiant saw Mulgrave Castle and Friends, Howell, master, also dismasted, bearing for Halifax, Nova Scotia. A week later Lloyd's List reported that Mulgrave Castle and Friends were among 12 vessels from the Jamaica convoy that Warrior had been convoying and that had put into Halifax in distress.

In 1816 Mulgrave Castle's trade changed to London–Bombay. In 1813 the EIC had lost its monopoly on the trade between India and Britain. British ships were then free to sail to India or the Indian Ocean under a licence from the EIC. Mulgrave Castle's owners applied for a licence on 20 February 1816 and received it the same day. She sailed for Bombay on 1 April 1816.

Porto Praya incident (1816): In May 1816 Mulgrave Castle was on a voyage from London to the Cape of Good Hope when she struck rocks at Boa Vista, Cape Verde, and came into Port Praya. Phillippa, Nichols, master, came into Porto Praya on 18 May as she was travelling from London to India. Philippa was seeking water and supplies, and the initial report was that both intended to leave towards the end of the month.

Captain G. Nichols spoke with Captain Ralph and agreed to take part of Mulgrave Castle's cargo to the Cape of Good Hope so that Mulgrave Castle could sail to Rio de Janeiro for repairs. This news infuriated the governor of Porto Praia, Don Antonio de Continto de Laneastie. Don Antonio had intended to have Mulgrave Castle surveyed and condemned in order that he might profit from the disposal of her cargo. Don Antonio incarcerated Ralph and Nichols, put fifty soldiers aboard Phillipa, and declared one of her passengers, a Captain Harrington a prisoner on parole. Eventually the governor relented and permitted the British vessels to leave. Captains Nichols, Ralph, and Harrington, as well as the other passengers on the vessels, signed a letter of protest to Don Antonio, informing him that they would bring the matter up with the "Right Hon. Viscount Strangford, the British Ambassador at the Court of Brazils, to be by him submitted to the Prince Regent of Portugal, and to the British Government."

Lloyd's List reported that on 6 July 1816 Mulgrave Castle had put into Rio de Janeiro in distress, "having been put on shore at Porto Praya." She would have to undergo considerable repairs before she could proceed.

Lloyd's Register for 1818 reported that Mulgrave Castle's trade was London–Cape of Good Hope, changing to London–Bengal.

On 1 May 1824 Mulgrave Castle sailed from England for Île de France. On 23 May 1825 Mulgrave Castle, J. Ralph, master, Tindale & Co., sailed from London for Madras.

== Fate ==
A letter from the Cape of Good Hope dated 4 September 1825 reported that the night before Mulgrave Castle had been sailing from London to Bombay and coming into Table Bay when she ran ashore about half a mile inside the Green Point Lighthouse, Cape Town. Her crew had been saved and although there was eight feet of water in her hold, most of her cargo would be saved. The ship herself was probably unable to be gotten off. A letter dated 20 September reported that Mulgrave Castle was a total wreck. Most of her stores and cargo was expected to be saved. Victory, Ferguson, master, would take the undamaged cargo to its destination; the damaged cargo would be auctioned. Apparently a heavy gale developed while salvage operations were in progress and she broke up.
