= Mary Howitt =

English poet, author and editor (1799–1888)

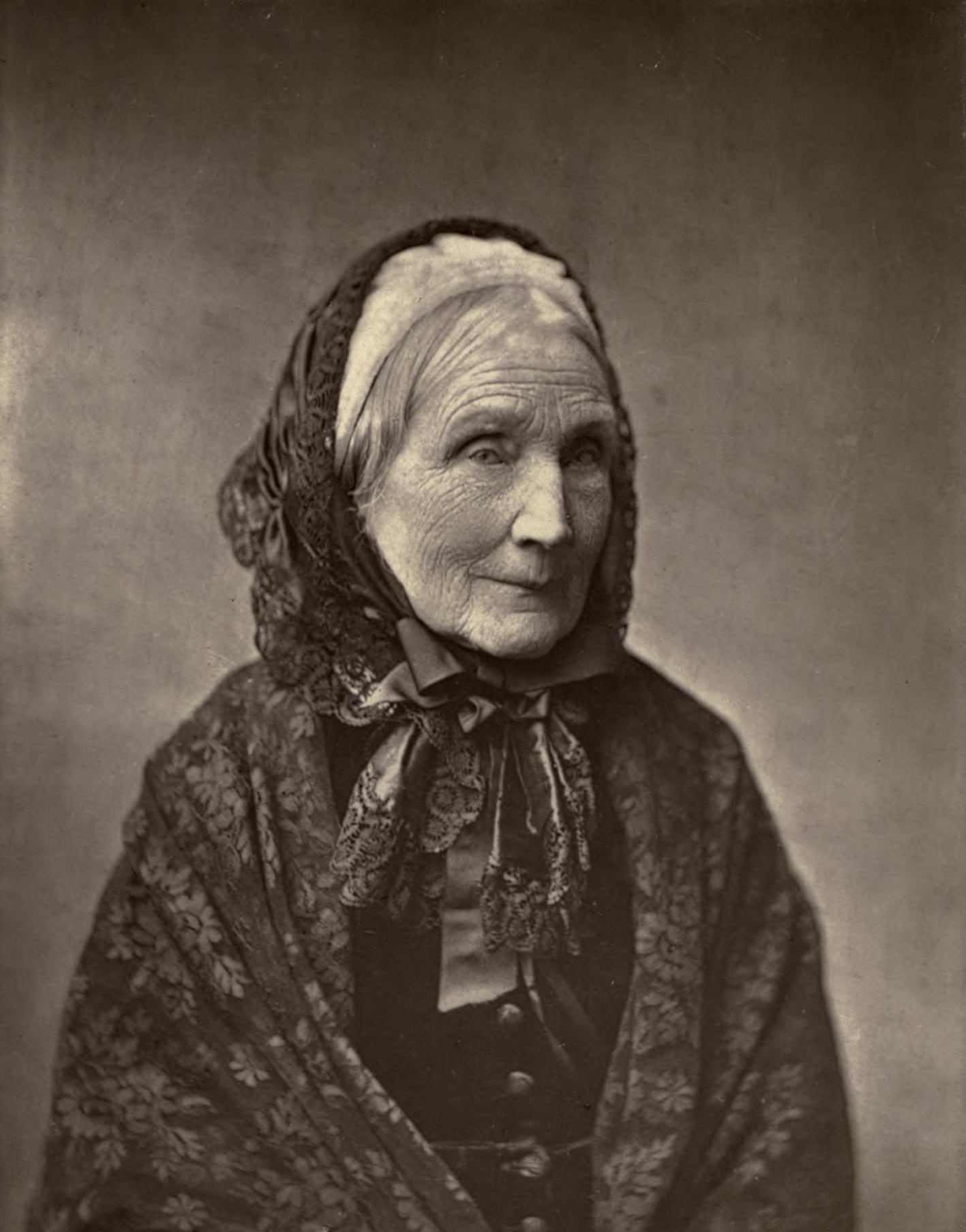
- Born: Mary Botham; 12 March 1799; Coleford, Gloucestershire, England
- Died: 30 January 1888 (aged 88); Rome, Kingdom of Italy
- Occupation: Writer
- Known for: Translator of Hans Christian Andersen's works
- Spouse: William Howitt (m. 1821)
- Children: 4, including Anna and Alfred
- Parents: Samuel Botham; Anne Wood

Mary Howitt (12 March 1799 – 30 January 1888) was an English writer, editor, translator and a pioneer of the women's rights movement in the UK. She is most known as the author of the famous poem The Spider and the Fly. Howitt translated several works by Hans Christian Andersen and Frederika Bremer. Some of her works were written in conjunction with her husband, William Howitt. Many, in verse and prose, were intended for young people.

== Background and early life ==
Mary Botham was born to Samuel Botham and Ann on 12 March 1799, at Coleford, Gloucestershire, where her parents lived temporarily, while her father, a prosperous Quaker surveyor and former farmer of Uttoxeter, Staffordshire, looked after some mining property. In 1796, aged 38, Samuel had married 32-year-old Ann, daughter of a Shrewsbury ribbon-weaver. They had four children: Anna, Mary, Emma, and Charles. Their Queen Anne house is now called Howitt Place. Mary Botham was taught at home, reading widely and began writing verse at a very early age.

== Marriage and writing ==
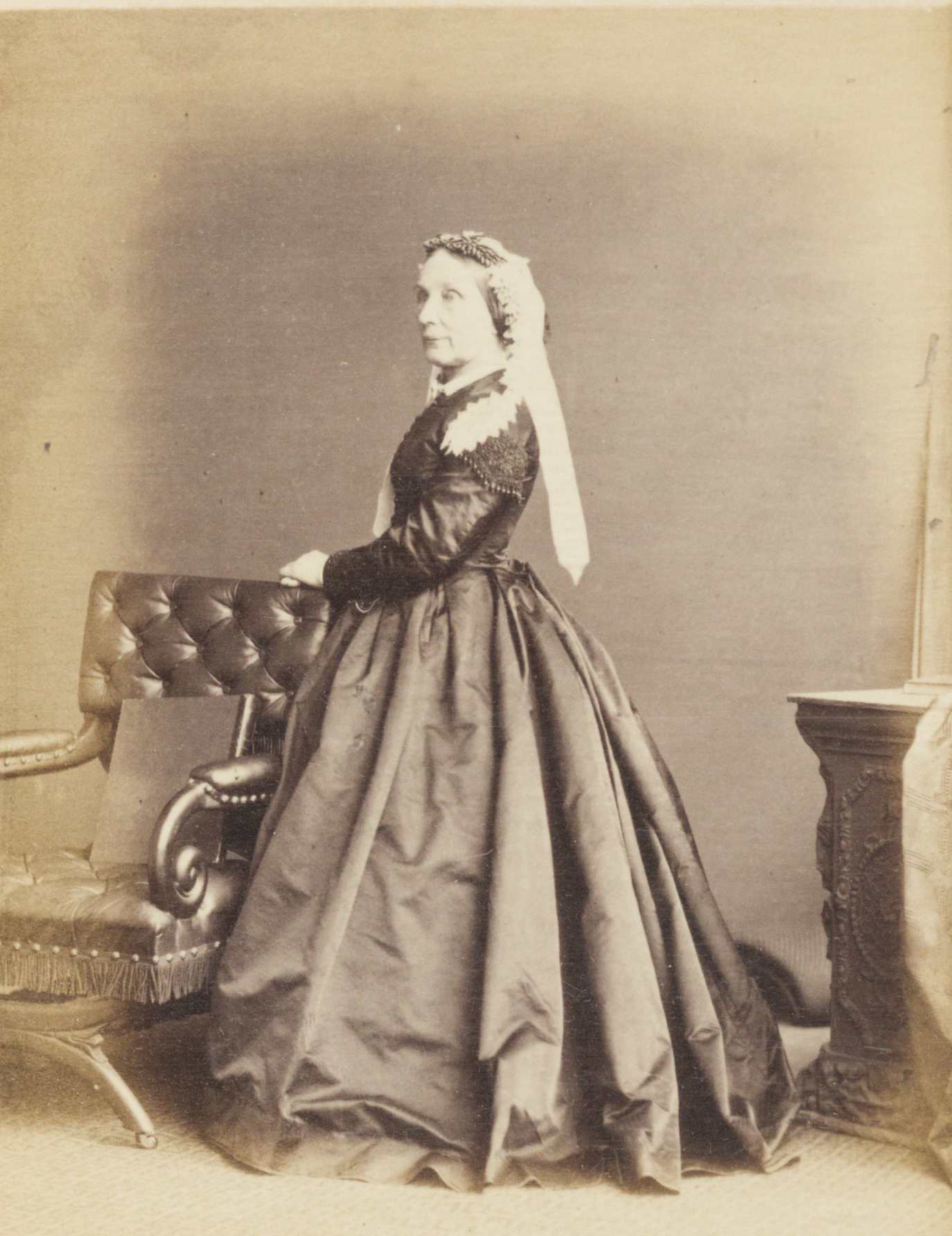
Mary Howitt, c. 1863, by Ernest Edwards

On 16 April 1821, Mary Botham married William Howitt and began a career of joint authorship with him. Her life was bound up with that of her husband; she was separated from him only during a period when he journeyed to Australia (1851–1854). They wrote more than 180 books.

The Howitts lived initially in Heanor in Derbyshire, where William was a pharmacist. Not until 1823, when they were living in Nottingham, did William decide to give up his business with his brother Richard and concentrate with Mary on writing. Their literary productions at first consisted mainly of poetry and other contributions to annuals and periodicals. A selection appeared in 1827 as The Desolation of Eyam and other Poems.

The couple mixed with many literary figures, including Charles Dickens, Elizabeth Gaskell and Elizabeth Barrett Browning. On moving to Esher in 1837, Howitt began writing a long series of well-known tales for children, with signal success. That same year, she and her husband toured Northern England and stayed with William and Dorothy Wordsworth. Their work was generally well regarded: in 1839 Queen Victoria gave George Byng a copy of Mary's Hymns and Fireside Verses.

William and Mary moved to London in 1843, and after a second move in 1844, counted Tennyson amongst their neighbours. While William was in Australia, Mary was responsible for getting his collection Stories from English and Foreign Life, a translation Ennemoser's History of Magic, and the Australian Boy's Book, through the press. During this time she also compiled a history of the United States and edited and wrote various juvenile works. Her Popular History of the United States, published in the United Kingdom in 1859 and the United States in 1860, was "quickly forgotten" in its time but has been praised in the 21st century as a "well-crafted work" that "surpassed all previous histories in its fluid literary style." Uniquely, she paid full attention to slavery, including its role in the north, and made "unprecedented criticisms" of slave codes in New York and South Carolina, compared the "so-called 1741 New York slave revolt" to the Salem witch trials, condemned the American Colonization Society, and pointed out the hypocrisy underlying the American Revolution, in which colonists contended for "their own liberty" while "depriving other people of theirs."

In 1853, they moved to West Hill in Highgate close to Hillside, the home of their friends, the physician and sanitary reformer Thomas Southwood Smith and his partner, the artist Margaret and her sister Mary Gillies. Mary Howitt had some years earlier arranged that the children's writer Hans Christian Andersen would visit Hillside to see the haymaking during his trip to England in 1847. After 1856, Mary, besides anonymous contributions to periodical literature of the day, edited with the assistance of her daughter A Treasury of Stories for the Young, in three volumes.

== Women's rights activism ==
Howitt strongly supported the advancement of women's rights as a professional writer, an editor, translator, mother and campaigner. Her periodical Howitt's Journal (1847–1848), co-edited with her husband, contained a progressive political agenda that allowed women to engage in debates on social and political issues. She translated the works of the Swedish novelist Fredrika Bremer who also championed women's rights. As a mother, Howitt gave her two daughters, Anna Mary Howitt and Margaret Howitt, every opportunity to develop their professional careers. In a letter addressed to her sister Anna, Howitt insisted that 'Girls must be made independent.' Through her eldest daughter Anna, Howitt and her good friend Barbara Leigh Smith Bodichon, author of the pamphlet A Brief Summary of the Laws of England Concerning Women (1854), she became involved as secretary of the Married Women's Property Committee (MWPC). This committee included other eminent and established professional women writers and Leigh Smith's friends such as Anna Mary, Bessie Rayner Parkes and Eliza Bridell Fox. Leigh Smith drafted a petition, which was circulated nationally, with a request for signatures to support a Married Women's Property Bill. Of the 26,000 signatures which were gathered, Mary Howitt personally collected hundreds of signatures. At the head of the petition, some respectable married women were placed, such as Mary Howitt, Elizabeth Barrett Browning and Elizabeth Gaskell. She was also one of the 1,500 women who signed the first mass petition for women's suffrage in 1866. Together with her married eldest daughter, Howitt continued the campaigns for votes for women and married women's property rights. They both contributed to a pamphlet Opinions of women on women's suffrage published by the Central Committee of the National Society for Women's Suffrage in 1879, pleading for votes for women.

== Scandinavia ==
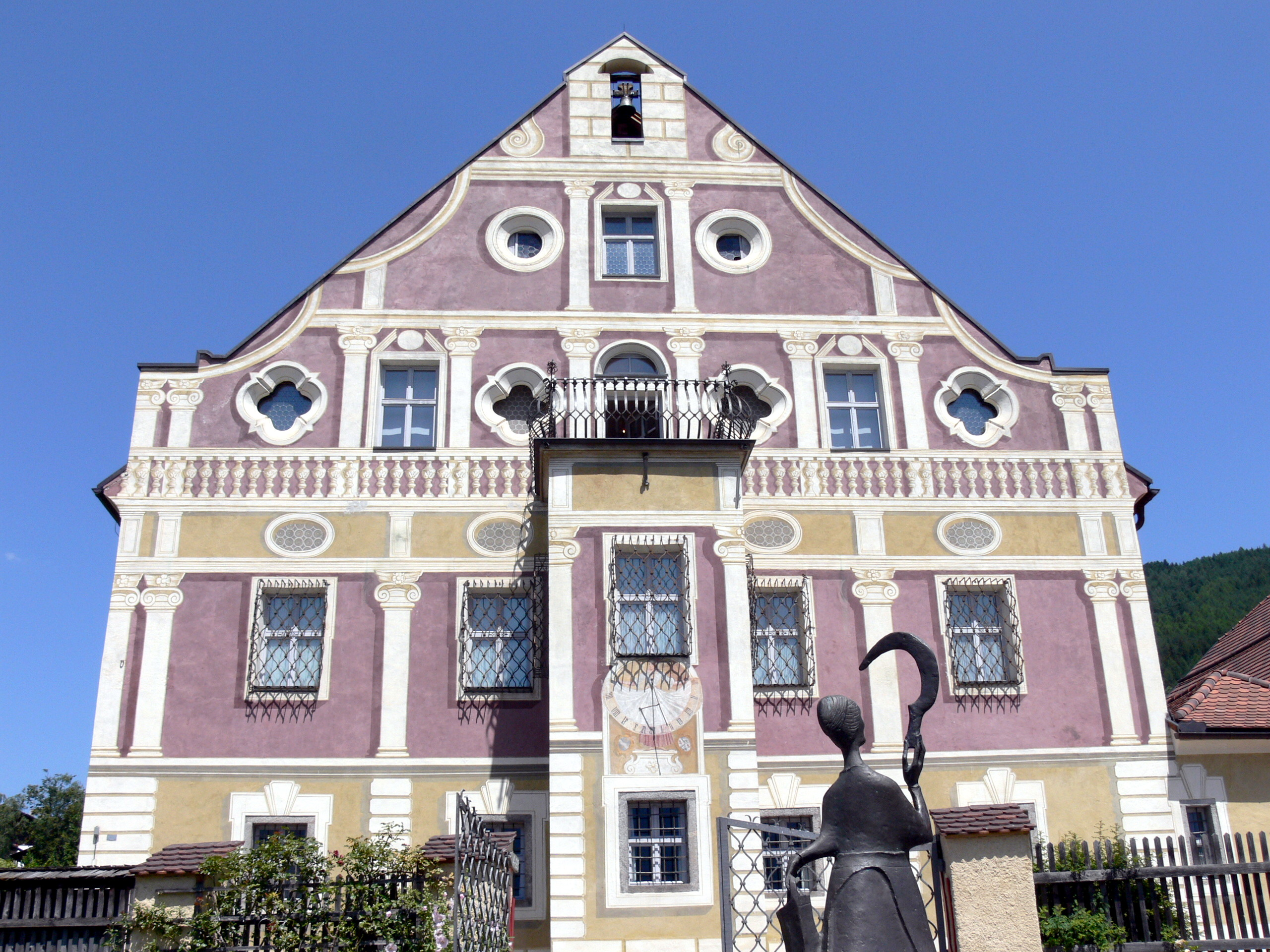
"Ansitz Mair am Hof". The summer retreat in Dietenheim, near Brunico, 1871–1879

In the early 1840s, Howitt was residing in Heidelberg, where her literary friends included Shelley's biographer Thomas Medwin and the poet Caroline de Crespigny, and her attention was drawn to Scandinavian literature. Howitt and a friend, Madame Schoultz, set about learning Swedish and Danish. She then translated into English and introduced Fredrika Bremer's novels (1842–1863, 18 vols). Howitt also translated many of Hans Christian Andersen's tales, such as

- Only a Fiddler (1845)
- The Improvisators (1845, 1847) 1900 edition at the Internet Archive
- Wonderful Stories for Children (1846)
- The True Story of every Life (1847).

Among her original works were The Heir of Wast-WayIand (1847). Howitt edited for three years the Fisher’s Drawing Room Scrap Book, writing, among other articles, "Biographical Sketches of the Queens of England". She edited the Pictorial Calendar of the Seasons, added an original appendix to her husband's translation of Joseph Ennemoser's History of Magic, and took the chief share in The Literature and Romance of Northern Europe (1852). Howitt also produced a Popular History of the United States (2 vols, 1859), and a three-volume novel called The Cost of Caergwyn (1864).

Howitt's brother-in-law Godfrey Howitt, his wife and her family emigrated to Australia, arriving at Port Phillip in April 1840. In June 1852, the three male Howitts, accompanied by Edward La Trobe Bateman, sailed there, hoping to make a fortune. Meanwhile, Howitt and her two daughters moved into The Hermitage, Bateman's cottage in Highgate, which had previously been occupied by Dante Gabriel Rossetti.

The men returned from Australia a number of years later. William wrote several books describing its flora and fauna. Their son, Alfred William Howitt, achieved renown as an Australian explorer, anthropologist and naturalist; he discovered the remains of the explorers Burke and Wills, which he brought to Melbourne for burial.

Mary Howitt had several other children. Charlton Howitt was drowned while engineering a road in New Zealand. Anna Mary Howitt spent two years in Munich with the artist Wilhelm von Kaulbach, an experience she wrote up as An Art-Student in Munich. She married Alaric Alfred Watts, wrote a biography of her father, and died while on a visit to her mother in Tirol in 1884. Margaret Howitt wrote the Life of Fredrika Bremer and a memoir of her own mother.

Howitt's name was attached as author, translator or editor to at least 110 works. She received a silver medal from the Literary Academy of Stockholm, and on 21 April 1879 gained a civil list pension of £100 a year. In her declining years, Howitt joined the Roman Catholic Church, and was one of an English deputation received by Pope Leo XIII on 10 January 1888. Her Reminiscences of my Later Life were printed in Good Words in 1886. The Times wrote of her and her husband:

Their friends used jokingly to call them William and Mary, and to maintain that they had been crowned together like their royal prototypes. Nothing that either of them wrote will live, but they were so industrious, so disinterested, so amiable, so devoted to the work of spreading good and innocent literature, that their names ought not to disappear unmourned.

Howitt was away from her residence in Meran in Tirol, spending the winter in Rome, when she died of bronchitis on 30 January 1888, at age 88.

== Her works ==
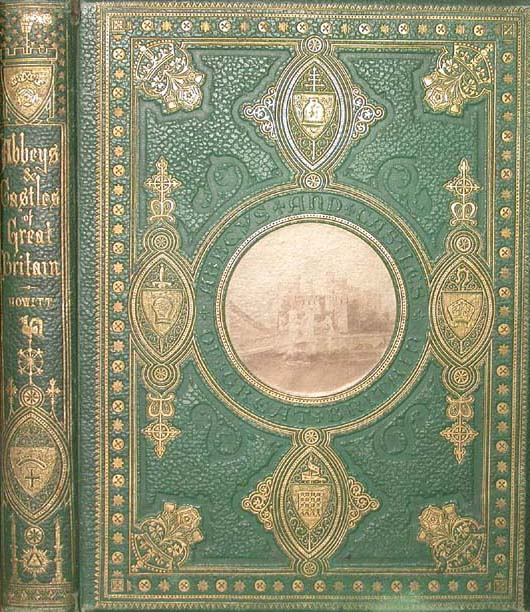
Abbeys and Castles of Great Britain, by William and Mary Howitt, includes photographs; a copy sold in 2007 for over £1000.

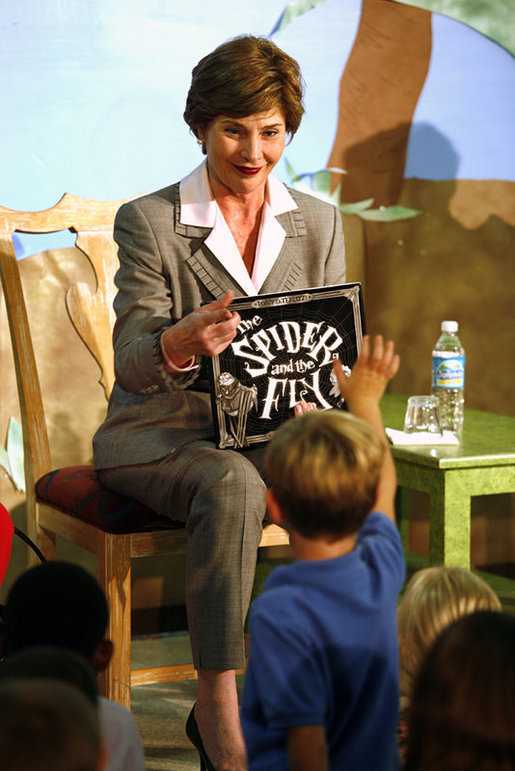
Laura Bush in 2006 when she was US First Lady, after reading from Howitt's The Spider and the Fly

Among those written independently of her husband were:

- Sketches of Natural History (1834)
- Wood Leighton, or a Year in the Country (1836)
- Birds and Flowers and other Country Things (1838)
- Hymns and Fireside Verses (1839)
- Hope on, Hope ever, a Tale (1840)
- Strive and Thrive (1840)
- Sowing and Reaping, or What will come of it (1841)
- Work and Wages, or Life in Service (1842)
- Which is the Wiser? or People Abroad (1842)
- Little Coin, Much Care (1842)
- No Sense like Common Sense (1843)
- Love and Money (1843)
- My Uncle the Clockmaker (1844)
- The Two Apprentices (1844)
- My own Story, or the Autobiography of a Child (1845)
- Fireside Verses (1845)
- Ballads and other Poems (1847)
- The Children's Year (1847)
- The Childhood of Mary Leeson (1848)
- Our Cousins in Ohio (1849)
- The Heir of Wast-Wayland (1851)
- The Dial of Love (1853)
- Birds and Flowers and other Country Things (1855)
- The Picture Book for the Young (1855)
- M. Howitt's Illustrated Library for the Young (1856; two series)
- Lillieslea, or Lost and Found (1861)
- Little Arthur's Letters to his Sister Mary (1861)
- The Poet's Children (1863)
- The Story of Little Cristal (1863)
- Mr. Rudd's Grandchildren (1864)
- Tales in Prose for Young People (1864)
- M. Howitt's Sketches of Natural History (1864)
- Tales in Verse for Young People (1865)
- Our Four-footed Friends (1867)
- John Oriel's Start in Life (1868)
- Pictures from Nature (1869)
- Vignettes of American History (1869)
- A Pleasant Life (1871)
- Birds and their Nests (1872)
- Natural History Stories (1875)
- Tales for all Seasons (1881)
- Tales of English Life, including Middleton and the Middletons (1881)

== The Spider and the Fly ==
The poem was originally published in 1829. When Lewis Carroll was readying Alice's Adventures Under Ground for publication, he replaced a parody he had made of a negro minstrel song with the "Lobster Quadrille", a parody of Mary's poem.

The poem became a Caldecott Honor Book in October 2003.
