= Howat =

Howat is a surname. Notable people with the surname include:

- Alexander Howat (1876–1945), Scottish-born American coal miner and labor leader
- Billy Howat, Scottish curler
- Cameron Howat (born 1985), Australian footballer
- Clark Howat (1918–2009), American actor
- Gerald Howat (1928–2007), British writer, historian and schoolmaster
- Ian Howat (born 1958), Welsh footballer
- John Howat (born 1970), Australian footballer
- Judy Howat MNZM (born 1935), New Zealand lawn bowler
- Kirsty Howat (born 1997), Scottish footballer
- Michael Howat (born 1958), English cricketer
- Nicola Howat (born 1997), Scottish rugby player
- Roy Howat, Scottish pianist and musicologist
- Rudolph Henderson Howat (1896–1957), Dean of Brechin

== See also ==
- Battersby Howat, architecture and interior design firm based in Vancouver, Canada
- Howat Freemantle, main character in And Now Good-bye by James Hilton
- Howatt (surname)
- Hiwatt, British company
- Howitt (surname)
- Howittia, plant genus
