= Margaret Rarru Garrawurra =

Aboriginal artist in Australia

Margaret Rarru Garrawurra is a senior Yolngu artist and weaver from Arnhem Land, Northern Territory, Australia. Born in Galiwin'ku (Elcho Island), as of 2025 she lives between her mother's Country of Laŋarra (Howard Island) and Yurrwi (Milingimbi Island). In Laŋarra, she gathers natural materials and processes them into artworks rooted in ancestral traditions and expressed through distinct, innovative forms.

== Early life ==
Rarru was introduced to the art of weaving by her numa (aunties) at a young age. She and her sister, Helen Ganalmirriwuy Garrawurra, were taught important Liyagawumirr clan designs by their father along with a deep understanding of the ancestral creation narratives of their tradition.

In 2006, after the death of her brother Mickey Durrng, Rarru and her sister inherited the right to paint Liyagawumirr sacred designs. Their aunt, Ruth Nalmakarra, guided them in reviving this cultural inheritance.

== Career ==
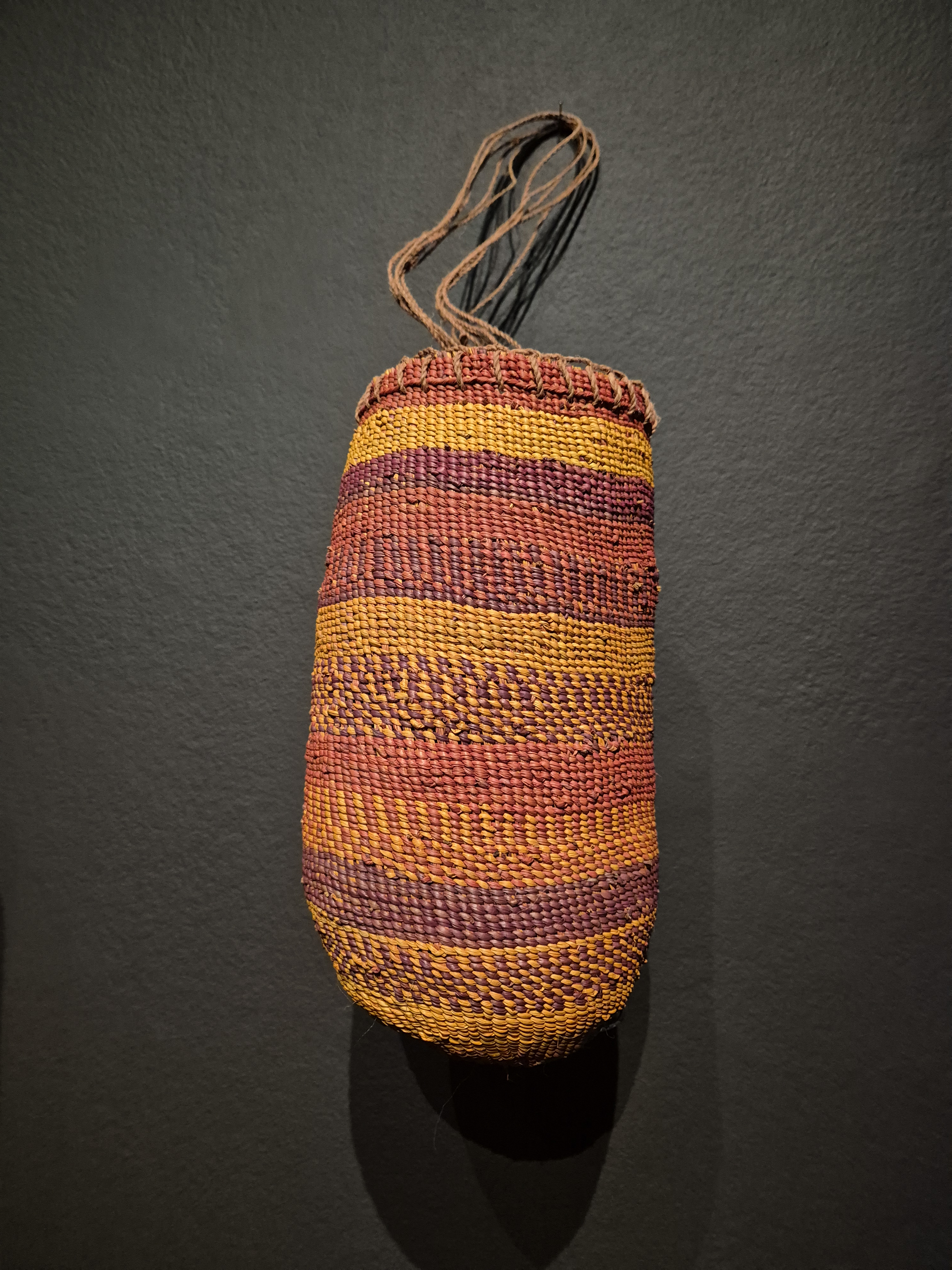
Boduk mindirr (Gamalanga conical basket), or dillybag, created and decorated with ochre by Rarru

Rarru is a leading artist within Milingimbi Art and Culture and is widely respected in her community. She is particularly known for her woven bathi (baskets), including the "Madonna Bra" series and Mindirr Mol, (Note: Mindirr is a dillybag.) black conical forms emphasising minimalist design. Her works incorporate functionality, as well as ceremonial significance, using design motifs such as ceremonial body painting patterns and referencing the journey of the ancestral Djaŋ'kawu Sisters.

Rarru is credited with developing and refining the method for producing black dye (mol) from local plants, a technique that has become a hallmark of Yolŋu weaving. Among Yolŋu weavers, she is acknowledged as the rightful owner of this black dye, and its exclusive use is reserved for her and those she personally authorizes.

== Awards ==
In 2023, Rarru won the main prize at the Telstra National Aboriginal and Torres Strait Islander Art Awards (NATSIAAs), receiving $100,000 for her large woven work Dhomala (Pandanus Sail). This piece reflects the historical connection between Yolŋu people and the Macassan traders. Rarru was inspired by memories of her father making a similar sail, a skill passed down from her great-grandfather, who had learned it from the Macassans. The work took approximately eight months to complete and involved harvesting pandanus leaves, dyeing them with natural bush dyes, and then weaving them into a sail form.

== Collections ==
Rarru's work is held in major collections, such as the Art Gallery of New South Wales, the Queensland Art Gallery, Brisbane's Gallery of Modern Art, the National Gallery of Victoria, the Art Gallery of South Australia, and the Museum der Kulturen in Switzerland.
