= Yakou =

Yakou may refer to:

== People ==
- Yakou Méïté (born February 11, 1996), Ivorian football player

== Places ==
- Yakou (mountain pass), Taiwan
- Yakō Station, Yokohama, Japan

== Traditions ==
- Yakou Piao-se, an event in Yakou, Nanlang, China
- Dillybag, an Aboriginal Australian bag
