= Howitt =

Howitt may refer to:

== Surname ==
Notable people with the surname Howitt include:

- Alfred Howitt (politician) (1879–1954), English medical doctor and politician
- Alfred William Howitt (1830–1908), Australian anthropologist and naturalist
- Anna Mary Howitt (1824–1884), English painter, writer and feminist
- Bobby Howitt (1925–2005), Scottish footballer
- Dann Howitt (born 1964), American baseball player
- Dave Howitt (born 1952), English footballer
- David Howitt (entrepreneur) (born 1968), American business consultant
- Dennis Howitt, British psychologist
- Godfrey Howitt (1800–1863), English-born Australian botanist and doctor
- Hugh Howitt, English pub landlord
- John Ransom Howitt, Canadian politician
- Mary Howitt (1799–1888), English poet and author
- Peter Howitt (actor) (born 1957), English actor and film director
- Peter Howitt (set decorator) (1928–2021), English set decorator
- Peter Howitt (economist) (born 1946), Canadian economist
- Richard Howitt (disambiguation), multiple people
- Sally Howitt, Scottish actress
- Samuel Howitt (1765–1822), English artist
- Steve Howitt, American politician
- Thomas Cecil Howitt (1889–1968), English architect
- William Howitt (1792–1879), English author

== Other uses ==
- Howitt, Queensland, a locality in the Shire of Carpentaria, Queensland, Australia

== See also ==
- Howatt (surname)
- Hiwatt, British company
- Howat (surname)
- Howittia, plant genus
