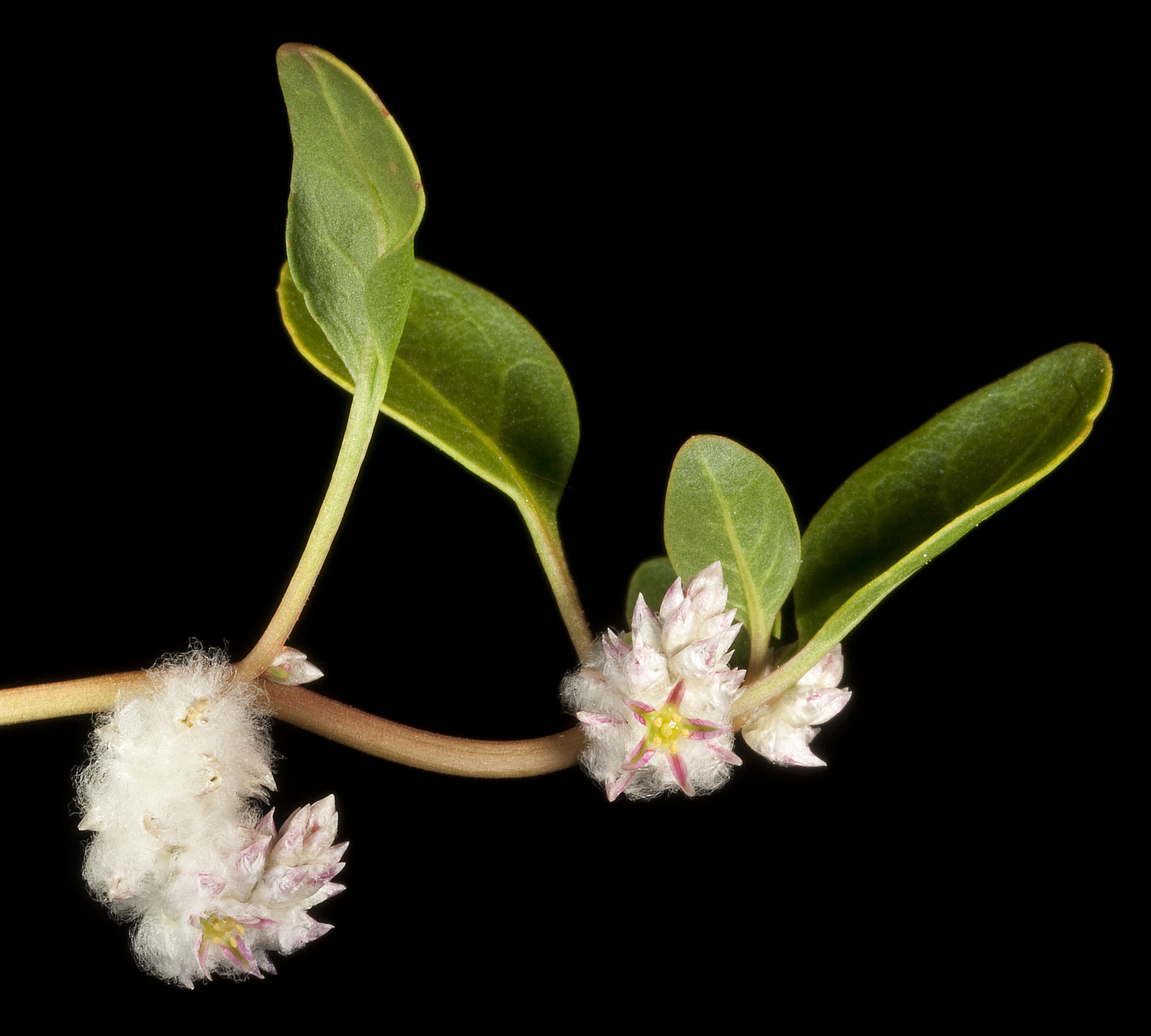

Scientific classification
- Kingdom: Plantae
- Clade: Tracheophytes
- Clade: Angiosperms
- Clade: Eudicots
- Order: Caryophyllales
- Family: Amaranthaceae
- Genus: Ptilotus
- Species: P. murrayi

Binomial name
- Ptilotus murrayi F.Muell.

Synonyms
- Ptilotus murrayi var. major J.M.Black; Ptilotus murrayi F.Muell. var. murrayi; Ptilotus petiolatus Farmar; Trichinium murrayi (F.Muell.) Ewart & O.B.Davies

= Ptilotus murrayi =

Species of herb

Ptilotus murrayi, commonly known as Murray's fox-tail, is a species of flowering plant in the family Amaranthaceae and is native to parts of Australia. It is a prostrate to low-lying annual herb with terete stems, lance-shaped or spatula-shaped stem leaves and cylindrical spikes of pinkish white flowers.

== Description ==
Ptilotus murrayi is a prostrate, mat-forming or low-lying annual herb that typically grows to a height of up to 1–15 cm (0.39–5.91 in), with terete, ribbed, glabrous stems. The stem leaves are lance-shaped to broadly lance-shaped or spatula-shaped, 5–30 mm (0.20–1.18 in) long, 3–9 mm (0.12–0.35 in) wide on a petiole 5–10 mm (0.20–0.39 in) long, and glabrous.

The flowers are pink and green or white and pink and borne singly or in cylindrical spikes in axils or at the ends of branches. There are egg-shaped, glabrous bracts 1.0–1.8 mm (0.039–0.071 in) long and 0.8–1.1 mm (0.031–0.043 in) wide and egg-shaped bracteoles 1.5–2.1 mm (0.059–0.083 in) long and 0.7–1 mm (0.028–0.039 in) wide. The outer sepals are narrowly lance-shaped, 2.0–3.3 mm (0.079–0.130 in) long and the inner sepals 1.8–2.8 mm (0.071–0.110 in) long. The style is 0.3–0.5 mm (0.012–0.020 in) long, straight and fixed to the centre of the ovary and there are five fertile stamens, the anthers 0.3–0.5 mm (0.012–0.020 in) long. Flowering occurs from April to August, extending into October in Queensland and South Australia, and the seeds are round, glossy black, about 0.9 mm (0.035 in) long and 0.7 mm (0.028 in) wide.

== Taxonomy ==
Ptilotus murrayi was first formally described in 1863 by Ferdinand von Mueller in his Fragmenta Phytographiae Australiae from specimens collected near Cooper Creek. The specific epithet (murrayi) honours James Patrick Murray, medical practitioner, member of the Alfred William Howitt expedition to recover the bodies of Burke and Wills, and later a blackbirder, who collected the type specimen from flooded Cooper Creek.

== Distribution and habitat ==
This species of Ptilotus grows in heavy, cracking soil on river banks and mud flats in the Carnarvon, Dampierland, Murchison, Gascoyne and Pilbara bioregions of Western Australia, in south-western Queensland and the Mitchell Grass Downs and Channel Country of South Australia.

== Conservation status ==
Ptilotus murrayi is listed as "not threatened" by the Government of Western Australia Department of Biodiversity, Conservation and Attractions

== See also ==
- List of Ptilotus species
