= Howatt =

Howatt is a surname. Notable people with the surname include:

- Charlie Howatt, Canadian political candidate
- Cornelius Howatt (1810–1895), farmer and political figure in Prince Edward Island
- Garry Howatt (born 1952), Canadian ice hockey player
- Hubert Howatt (1867–1919), farmer and political figure on Prince Edward Island
- John Howatt Bell (1846–1929), lawyer and politician, 14th Premier of Prince Edward Island
- Lester Alexander Howatt (1909–1994), American businessman and politician

== See also ==
- Howat (surname)
- Hiwatt
- Howitt
- Howittia
