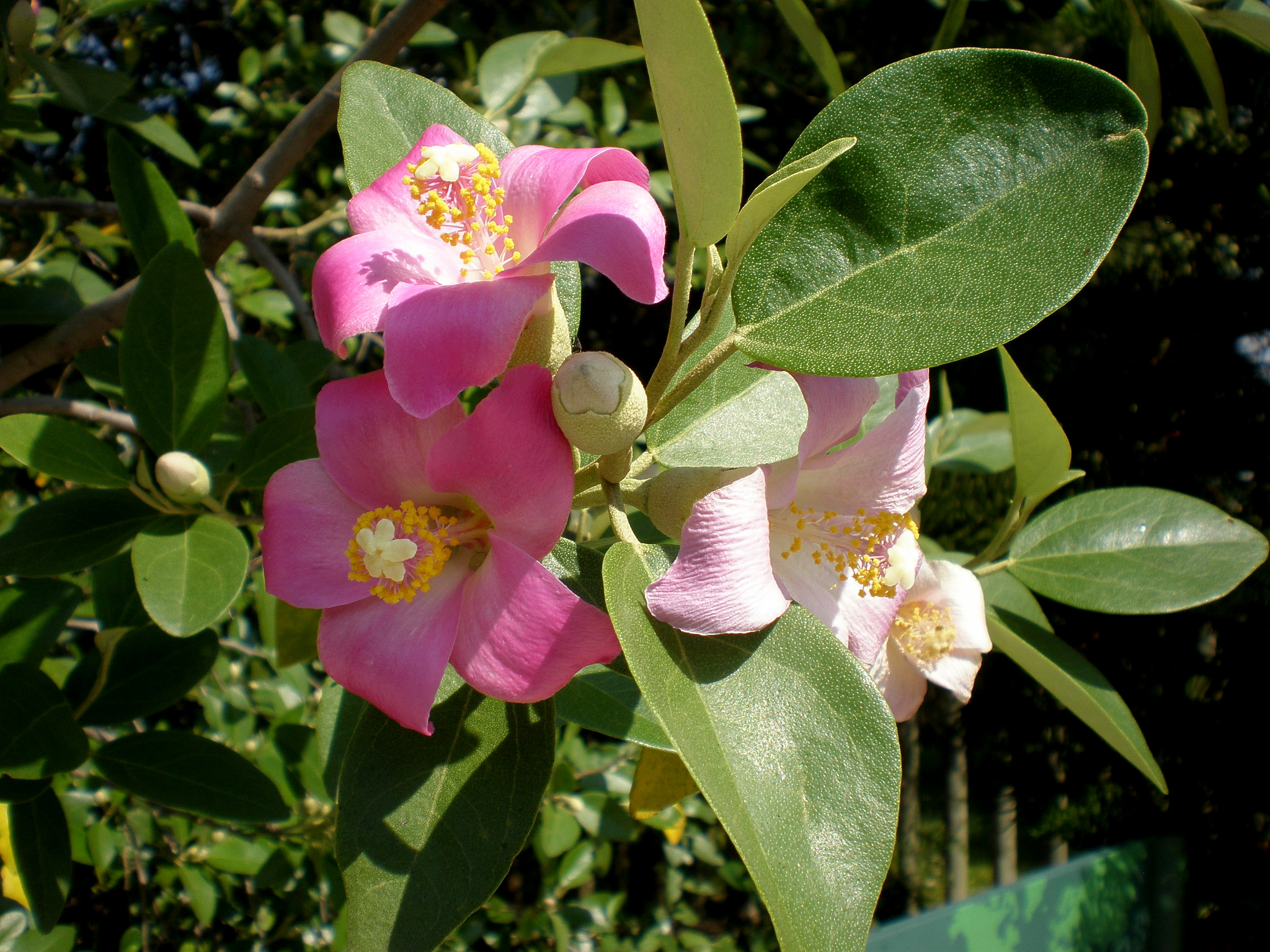

Scientific classification
- Kingdom: Plantae
- Clade: Tracheophytes
- Clade: Angiosperms
- Clade: Eudicots
- Clade: Rosids
- Order: Malvales
- Family: Malvaceae
- Genus: Lagunaria
- Species: L. patersonia

Binomial name
- Lagunaria patersonia (Andrews) G.Don

Synonyms
- Hibiscus patersonii R.Br.; Hibiscus patersonius Andrews, orth. var.; Laguna squamea Vent.; Lagunaria patersonia var. typica Domin; Solandra squamea Poir.

= Lagunaria patersonia =

Species of tree

Lagunaria patersonia is a species of tree in the family Malvaceae. It is commonly known as the pyramid tree, Norfolk Island hibiscus, Queensland white oak, sally wood, or simply as white oak on Norfolk Island. Its seed capsules are filled with irritating hairs giving rise to common names, itchy bomb tree, and cow itch tree.

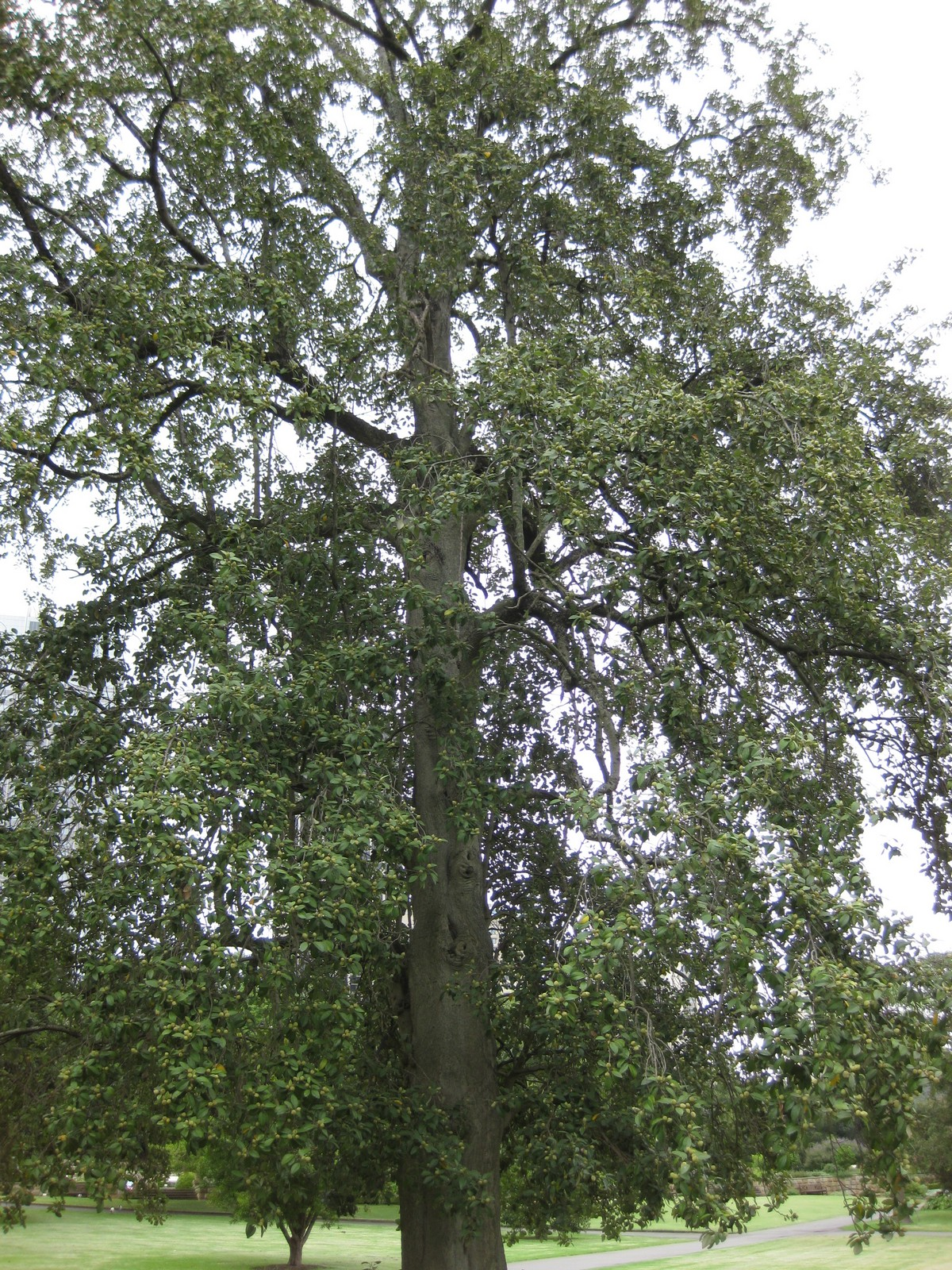
Habit

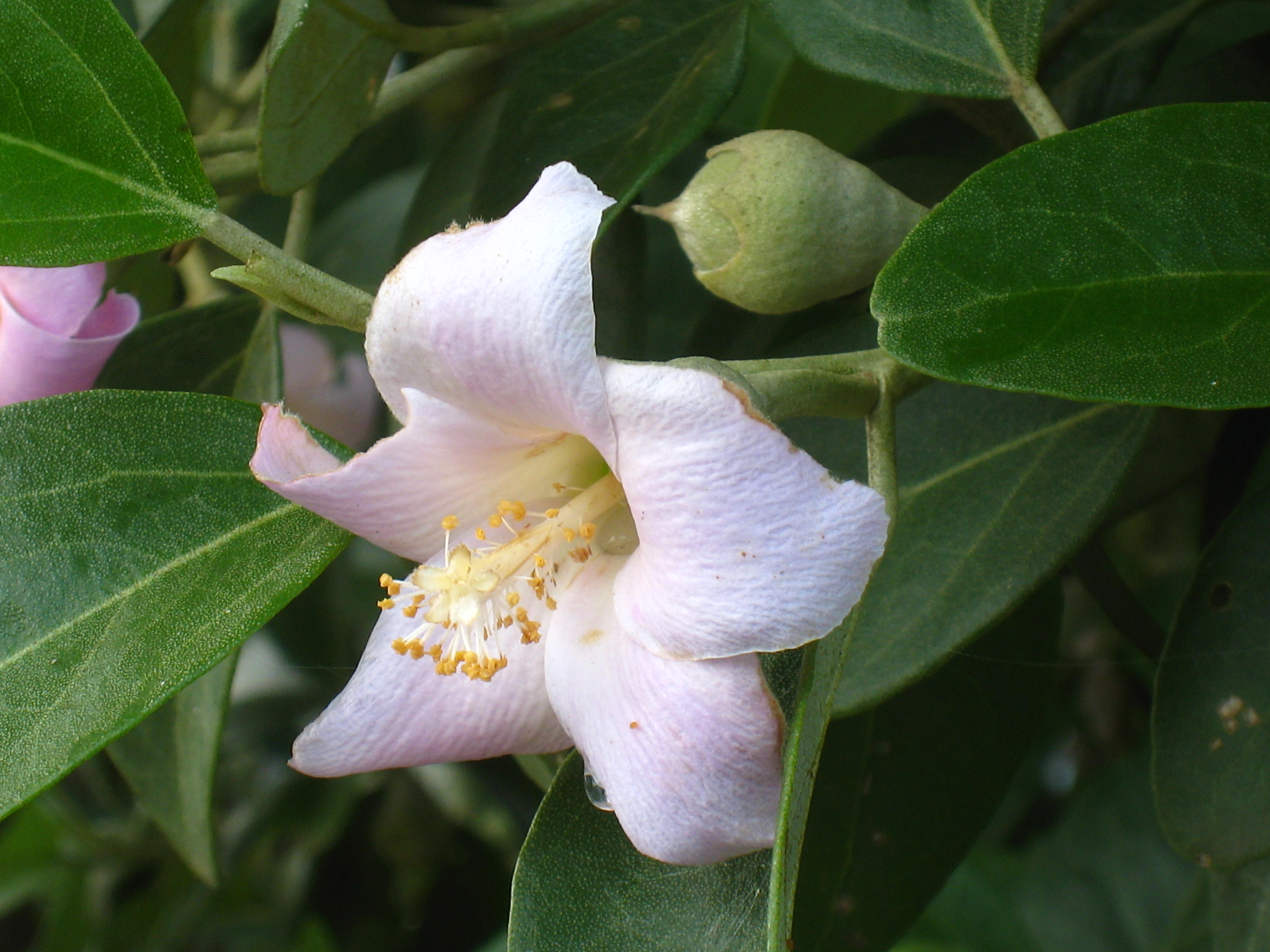
Pale flower

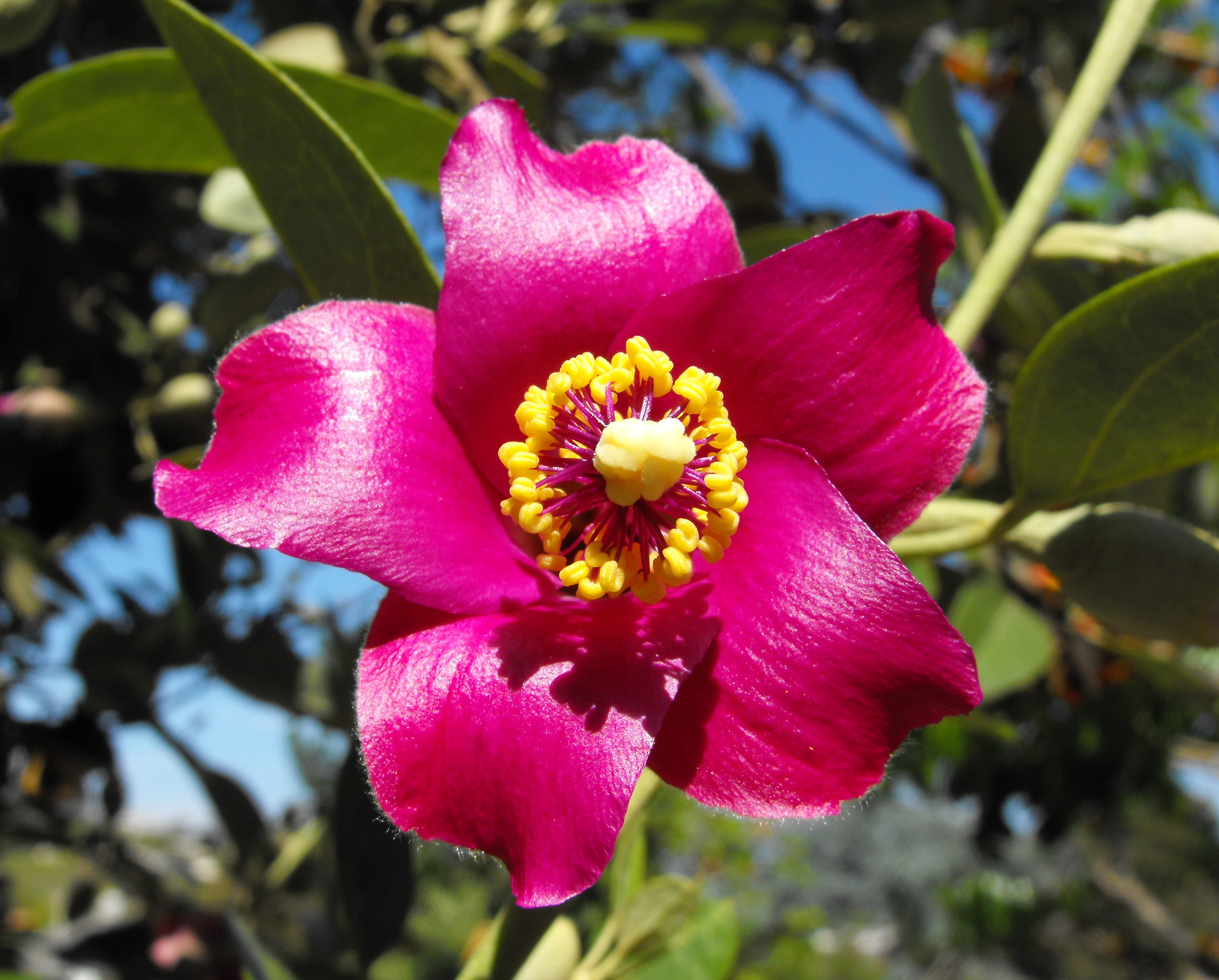
Deeper coloured flower

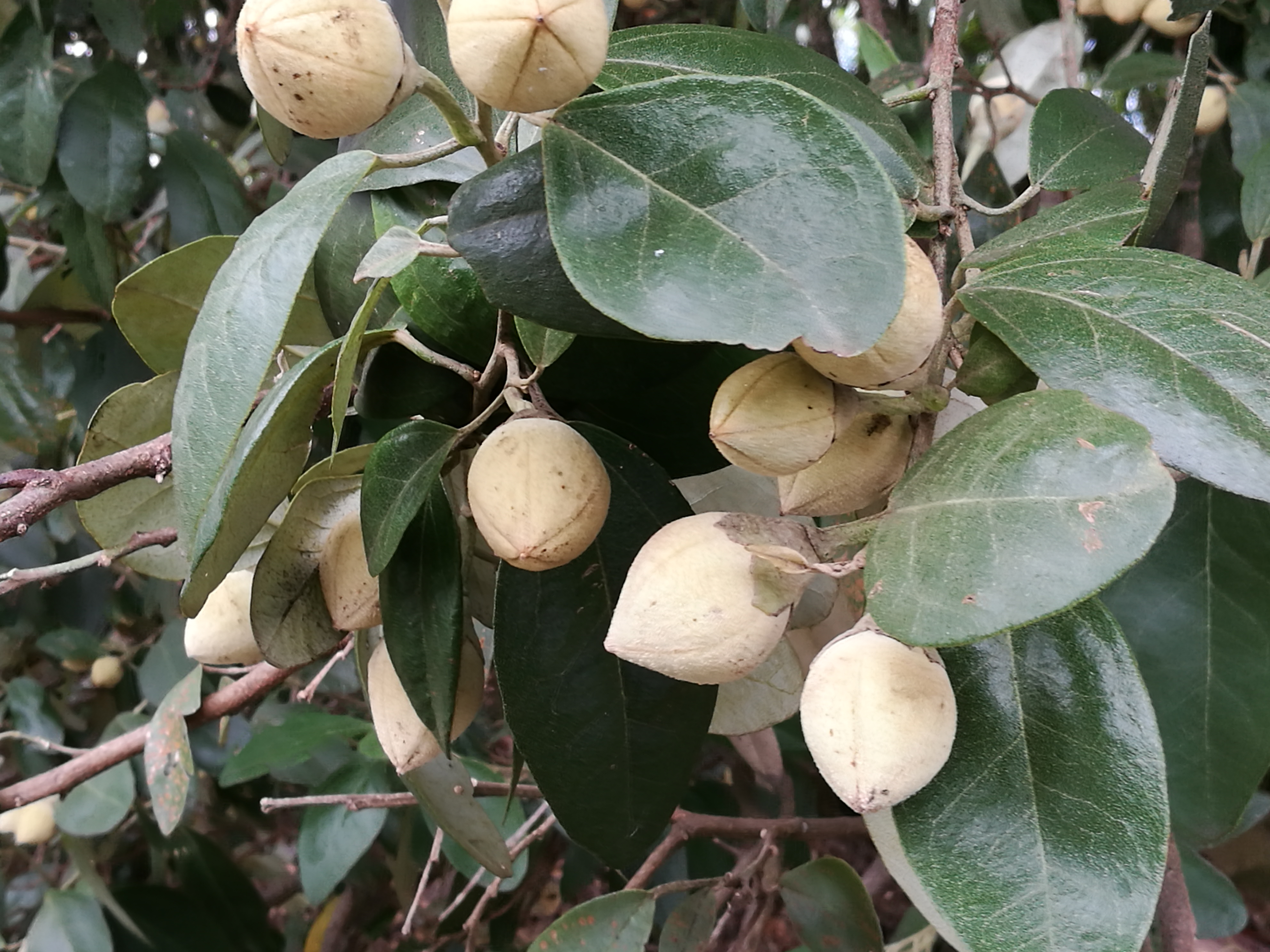
Fruits
