= Battersby Howat =

BattersbyHowat Architects Inc.
- Company type: Private
- Industry: Architecture
- Founded: 1996
- Founder: David Battersby; Heather Howat
- Headquarters: Vancouver, British Columbia, Canada
- Services: Architecture, landscape architecture, interior design
- Website: battersbyhowat.com

BattersbyHowat Architects (also known as Battersby Howat) is an architecture, landscape architecture, and interior design firm based in Vancouver, Canada, with a second office in Edmonton. The practice was founded in 1996 by partners David Battersby and Heather Howat.

== History ==
Battersby and Howat met during their undergraduate degree programs at the University of Manitoba, where they studied landscape architecture and interior design respectively. They completed their graduate studies in architecture at the Technical University of Nova Scotia (TUNS), which has since been merged with Dalhousie University. After university, the pair married and moved to Vancouver to open their architectural practice. While the marriage has since ended, their friendship and professional partnership continue.

== Architectural style ==
The firm is known for their multidisciplinary approach to projects; wherever possible, they design the landscape in tandem with the architecture. The reciprocal relationship between nature and artifice, especially in contrasted interior and exterior contexts, is a frequent motif in their works. Battersby has said that he appreciates the contrast of "crisp architecture and soft landscape; when everything is rigorous, it tends to be overwhelming." Their vernacular approach to architecture takes full advantage of the mild climate and abundance of nature in British Columbia, evoking notable West Coast influences such as Arthur Erickson, Richard Neutra, and Rudolph Schindler.

== Selected projects ==
=== Cornwall (2006) ===
This multi-family development is located on Cornwall Avenue in Vancouver, opposite Kitsilano Beach. Each of the four suites occupies an entire floor, with northerly views towards the ocean and Stanley Park. While the firm is often lauded for their ability to connect their projects with rugged, wild sites, this project was designed around the relationship between the site and its surrounding urban landscape. Concrete walls running north–south are staggered around the long, narrow site to articulate interior and exterior spaces while maintaining privacy between residents and adjacent developments. The intermediate spaces formed by these walls between the site and its neighbor create an oasis of landscaped courts.

=== Gambier 1 (2007) ===
Accessible only by boat, Gambier 1 is a getaway cabin located on Gambier Island in the Gulf Islands, between Vancouver Island and the mainland. The cabin sits on a dramatic four-story cliff face that overlooks Howe Sound. Special attention was given to the impact of construction — for example, the floor slab is cantilevered from the foundation to minimize excavation and the use of footings. The ground freed up by the cantilevering provides space for bracken fern and other indigenous vegetation to flourish. The exterior is clad in vertically oriented dark stained cedar siding, recalling the bark of conifers that surround the site.

=== Whistler Residence (2013) ===
The residence, located on a slope in the resort community of Whistler, British Columbia, is a modern take on the timber chalets local to the area. The design captures the "essential" qualities of a ski lodge, such as exposed timber beams, while dispensing with the formal and stylistic constraints associated with this typology. The visual mass of the building is broken up by the illusion that a significant section of it is below grade. This effect was achieved by carefully blasting away at the bedrock to create a sort of basin around the building. Much of the exterior is covered in dark shingles, referencing the local style. This is contrasted by sections of exposed precast concrete panels. Recesses in the facade are lined with either red cedar or large panels of glazing, inviting warmth and light into the interior.

== List of projects ==
- 2018 Edgemont, North Vancouver, British Columbia
- 2018 Patricia Heights, Edmonton, Alberta
- 2018 West 21st, Vancouver, British Columbia
- 2018 McLeod Building 1, Edmonton, Alberta
- 2017 Southlands, Vancouver, British Columbia
- 2016 West 5th, Vancouver, British Columbia
- 2015 Fairmile, West Vancouver, British Columbia
- 2014 Valdes Island, Valdes Island, British Columbia
- 2014 Burnkit Design Studio, Vancouver, British Columbia
- 2011 Kadenwood 1, Whistler, British Columbia
- 2009 Aritzia Headquarters, Vancouver, British Columbia
- 2008 Tolmie, Vancouver, British Columbia
- 2007 Gambier 1, Gambier Island, British Columbia
- 2006 Cornwall, Vancouver, British Columbia
- 2004 Gulf Island Residence, Gulf Islands, British Columbia
- 2001 Midblock Residence, Vancouver, British Columbia

== Awards ==
- 2019 Lieutenant Governor of British Columbia Award, Award of Merit for Edgemont Residence
- 2018 Western Living's Designer of the Year, Designer of the Year: Landscape
- 2012 Canadian Architect Award of Excellence for UBC Geological Field School, Oliver, BC
- 2011 Western Living's Designer of the Year, Designer of the Year: Architecture
- 2011 Western Living's Designer of the Year, Designer of the Year: Interior Design
- 2004 Canadian Architect Award of Excellence for North Bend Residence
- 2001 Canadian Architect Award of Excellence for Mayne Island Residence
