= Mickey Durrng =

Australian Indigenous artist

- Micky Durrng Garrawurra
- Born: 1940; Howard Island, Australia
- Died: 2006 (aged 65–66); Yurruwi (Milingimbi)
- Other names: Micky Dorrng, Micky Garrawurra
- Known for: Indigenous Australian art, bark painting
- Father: Nupurray Garrawurra

Mickey Durrng Garrawurra (1940–2006), usually referred to as Mickey Durrng, was an Aboriginal Australian artist known for his natural ochres and pigments on paper, bark, and logs.

== Biography ==
Mickey Durrng Garrawurra was born c. 1940 in eastern Arnhem Land. He spent the majority of his life at Langarra on Howard Island, which is located in the Arafura Sea. Durrng died in 2006, at the age of 66, in his home in Millingimbi, in the Corcodile Islands of central Arnhem Land, after a long battle with illness.

In his early life, Durrng worked as a fisherman from the Galiwinku mission on Echo Island. Depending on the time of year, he fished off the island of Milingimbi or upstream in the Glyde River near Ramingining.

Durrng has been described as one of "the best-known artists using classic Garrawurra designs that include bush turkey and the classic body-painting striped design known as kingfisher". Garrawurra men have historical have pursued art as a profession.

"Durrng was one of the last senior men of the great Garrawurra family of 'seven fathers'. Durrng's grandfather sired seven sons, of whom Durrng's father Nupurray Garrawurra was the youngest." He was a member of the Dhuwa moiety and an elder of the Liyagawumirr clan of Yolngu people. His language group is Buyuyukulmirr/Liyagalawumirr. When nearing his death, Durrng's role as elder was to select the person who would carry on the traditions, and he selected his sister Ruth Nalmakarra.

== Career ==
Durrng made a career out of painting with pigments and natural ochres on paper. His career in aboriginal art is extensive and has made a profound impact on the Aboriginal art world. Durrng's works are a detailed description of ancestral beings, stories, and lessons. A majority of his works are centered around the stories of the Djan'kawu sisters and clan designs. Durrng's most profitable piece to date is Oysters and Waterholes which sold for US $4,298.

Durrng's "first bold red, yellow, and white striped Djang'kawu painting" was inspired by a work from Paddy Dhathangu. This painting was the first time the ceremonial design was not on a person or 3-dimensional object. This novel piece led to his first commission from Perspecta 1992 at the Art Gallery of New South Wales.

It was not until 1997 that Durrng finally left his family and homeland to travel to Melbourne for his first art exhibition. After 1997 and until his death, Durrng travelled to both Canada and the United States a multitude of times to display his works at art exhibits.

In regard to his works which are typically riddled with water holes, stripes, and natural pigments, he claims that "stripes are the authority...colours hold the power of the earth. Sun, water, creation, for everything." Durrng is most commonly known for his depictions of the Djan'kawu sisters; ancestral beings known as owners of ceremonial law and founders of the Dhuwa moiety. The sisters gave birth to the first people of the Dhuwa moiety and are responsible for creating all of the Dhuwa customs and ceremonies. The Ngarra ceremony is performed to honor the journey of the Djan'kawu Sisters. The story of the sisters is characterized by flag-like designs as they are representative of the waterholes created with the Djan'kawu Sisters digging sticks. These holes were essential to the growth and life of the land.

Mickey Durrng Garrawurra performed many ceremonial duties and was considered to have a deep level of knowledge about Liyagauwumirr ceremonies and ancestors. Durrng also has a performance background, which allows him to further express his Country. Durrng's style is often described as "jewel-like." His unique artistic style of boldly striped paintings and hollow log coffins that represent "Dreaming" have garnered him recognition and praise.

For an extended period of time, Durrng and his brother Tony Dhanyala were the only people authorised to paint the Liyagauwumirr's most important clan designs: the Djirri-didi painted on the body during the Ngarra cleansing ceremony. These designs are made up of stripes and circles that tell the stories of their ancestors. Many of the paintings are simple bands of red, yellow and white that stretch across the painting. While simple, the works contain the mysteries and cultural knowledge of Durrng's and Dhanyala's homeland. Durrng stated, "These designs are the power of the land. The sun, the water, creation, for everything." At the time, the 'inside' meaning of the Liyagauwumirr clan designs was only understood by initiated men. Dhanyala died two years before Durrng, and just before Durrng's death he gave the rights to his sister, Ruth Nalmakarra and her family, to draw and paint their clan designs. While this was an unorthodox decision made against clan tradition, Nalmakarra has continued his work to revive the cultural designs that strengthen the unity of the community.

A few key differences arise when comparing Mickey Durrng and his sisters' approaches to their artwork. Specifically, their depictions of the Gapu Milminydjarrk (Waterholes at Garriyak) story clearly show a divergence in their artistic styles. Durrng's depiction of the story is characterized by a rigid geometric order, with evenly sized and spaced waterholes that stand out from the contrast of light and dark colours. In comparison, Lena Walunydjanalil arranges her waterholes irregularly to create contrast, unlike Durrng's creation of contrast with colour shades. Margaret Rarru's work differs from Durrng's as it created an illusion of the content pushing outward towards the piece's border. Helen Ganalmirrawuy's art is more complex than her brother's, with white outlines being a prominent technique. Her art still maintains the geometric order featured in Durrng's work. Nalmakarra's paintings are known for their strict adherence to tradition, with a restrained style and use of cross-hatching reminiscent of older aesthetics. Ruth Nalmakarra's work is the most similar to Mickey Durrng's.

His sister, Ruth Nalmakarra, commented on Durrng's decision to pass the traditionally male-known information to his female counterparts, stating that "elders have a responsibility to choose who should take over the leadership to carry on their stories. It happens this way because there are people passing every day, every month, every year. In that case, before they pass, they have to call on those people that they can choose to keep the stories strong. They look to people with strong feelings and a strong voice. They appoint them to know and carry on the story." While this was initially seen as an abnormal choice, his actions had a larger goal and deeper reasoning. His father and uncle had more daughters than sons, which meant that Mickey spent his life with many women role models. Additionally, it was a decision based on concern for the survival of traditional, ceremonial stories, and because he was surrounded by mostly women, he saw who cared for these stories the most and could therefore continue the cultural stories' lineage.

Durrng first gained popularity in the early 1990s when he started painting the Djirri-didi on bark. His popularity was birthed out of the organized rigidity that had been absent in previously successful Aboriginal art from Arnhem Land. Many typical works of modern Aboriginal art contain detailed cross-hatching, and a fluid, meandering nature to the work; Durrng's simplistic colour blocking, and staunch geometric figures provided a contrast that introduced new conceptualizations of modern Aboriginal art.

Critics often claimed that is work was influenced by modern art movements and strayed from the traditional work that has always come from Arnhem Land. However, Durrng's works were only representations of the paintings on the bodies during the Ngarra ceremony which is described as "a mortuary rite performed to remember the dead and to prepare their spirits for the afterlife, [and] is also a celebration of regeneration and renewal that recalls the ancestral travels of the Djan'kawu Sisters". Durrng, a proponent of his own work, was largely unfazed by critics, focusing instead on maintaining the tradition and cultural importance found within his works.

Durrng belonged to the Bula'bula Arts cooperative in Ramingining, and has numerous, well-known works. Notably, his optical murals were exhibited in the Gallery One at Sydney's Museum of Contemporary Art (2000), Sprengel Museum in Hanover (2001), and Reina Sofia in Madrid (2002).

== Impacts ==
After his death, his sisters worked to bring back the culturally-significant designs that Durrng had entrusted them with. While many of them had strong weaving skills, they had never painted before due to the gender restrictions on their clan. However, after a slow start, paintings maintaining Durrng's legacy began to emerge rapidly from his family members. Durrng closely followed the Yonglu assertion that "I am entitled to paint this," and this manifested itself in his art. However, while it also was revealed in his sisters' work following his death, there were key differences in their pieces - most notably in their depictions of the Gapi Milminydjarrk (the Waterholes at Garriyak). While his work depicts evenly sized and spaced waterholes in a rigid geometric order, his sister, Lena Walunydjanalil abandons the order that Mickey uses, and instead places through irregularity around the bark in a movement stemming from her use of line rather than tonal contrast. Additionally, his other two sisters Margaret Rarru and Helen Ganalmirrawuy included key differences in their works, like irregular shapes of bark and more complex schemas.

These differences point to the cultural and epistic moment when shifts in family structure result in a plethora of new approaches to a traditionally restricted and formal mode of art production. Thanks to Durrng's authority, the women in his family were able to make their clan designs widely available to younger female artists, keeping the designs strong as well as a strong economic and cultural outlet at Milingimbi.

== Notable works ==
=== Djang'kawu Sisters' Waterhold at Gariyak (1990) ===
- Natural pigments on bark
- 115 x 56 cm
- Kluge-Ruhe Aboriginal Art Collection
  - Gift of John W. Kluge, 1997

=== Mululu (1993) ===
- Synthetic polymer paint and natural pigments on canvas
- 200.1 x 130 cm A: 200,1 x 130 cm
- Place of Creation: Ramingining, NT

=== Djan'kawu sisters at Gariyak (1994) ===
- Synthetic polymer paint on canvas
- 198.50 x 135 cm
- Place of Creation: Northern Territory, Central Arnhem Land

=== Djang'kawu sisters story (1998) ===
- Earth pigments on Stringybark
- 99.1 x 48.9 cm
- Place of Creation: Elcho Island, Northern Territory
- National gallery of Victoria, Melbourne

Description:

The Ngarra mortuary ceremony is the foundation for the designs painted in the Djang'kawu sisters story (1998). The Djang'kawu sisters story tells of sisters, Dhalkuwrrngawy and Barradawy, which cross the land during creation time, giving rise to the first people of the Dhuwa moiety. The sisters created the clans, languages names, and ceremonies, which connect the clans. The Ngarra ceremony has the Liyagauwumirr paint their bodies in traditional reds (Miku), whites (Watharr), and yellows (Buthjalak), in celebration of the sisters' journey. Durrng's Djang'kawu sisters story, represents the body paint used through the ceremony, telling the story of the sisters.

=== Suite of sacred Djirrididi designs (2000) ===
- Earth pigments on paper
- (a) 143.1 × 93.0 cm (image) 151.0 × 100.6 cm (sheet) (b) 144.0 × 93.0 cm (image) 152.0 × 100.7 cm (sheet) (c) 144.0 × 93.0 cm (image) 152.0 × 100.5 cm (sheet) (d) 144.6 × 93.0 cm (image) 152.0 × 101.0 cm (sheet) (e) 143.1 × 92.6 cm (image) 152.0 × 100.6 cm (sheet)
- Place of Creation: Langarra, Howard Island, Northern Territory
- National Gallery of Victoria, Melbourne

=== Garriyak body painting (2006) ===
- Natural pigments on bark
- Collection: Queensland Art Gallery

Description:

The minimalist, cross patterns may represent the winding yam vines, or rays of sunlight during sunrise, while the contrasting triangles, entwined with interconnected circles represent the location of fresh waterholes. Thick, bold, horizontal stripes, alternating red and yellow are laid upon a white background. The stripes represent the kingfisher, sunrays, shadows found at sunset, and the bodies of the Djang'kawu sisters. It is a story of creation and culture told through very simplistic and modern means.

=== Lorrkon (Burial pole) (2006) ===
- Wood with natural pigments
- 210 x 25 cm (diam.) (irreg.)

== Collections ==
- Art Gallery of New South Wales
- Kluge-Ruhe Aboriginal Art Collection of the University of Virginia
- Linden Museum Stuttgart, Germany
- Museum of Contemporary Art, Sydney
- National Gallery of Australia
- National Gallery of Victoria
- Queensland Art Gallery
