= Richard Howitt =

Richard Howitt may refer to:

- Richard Howitt (poet) (1799–1869), British poet
- Richard Howitt (cricketer, born 1864) (1864–1951), English cricketer
- Richard Howitt (cricketer, born 1977), English cricketer
- Richard Howitt (politician) (born 1961), British politician and CEO
