= Gerald Howat =

British cricket writer

- Born: 12 June 1928; Glasgow, Scotland
- Died: 10 October 2007 (aged 79); Oxford

Gerald Howat (12 June 1928 – 10 October 2007), born Gerald Malcolm David Howat, was a British writer on cricket, a historian and a schoolmaster.

== Early life ==
Howat was born in Glasgow, Scotland. As a boy he was awarded a bursary to Glenalmond College. He continued his education at Edinburgh University. He then did his National Service as a Flying Officer based at RAF Titchfield.

== Academic career ==
He spent three years teaching for the oil firm Trinidad Leaseholds Ltd at Pointe-à-Pierre. Sonny Ramadhin was the firm's storekeeper.

Returning to England, he was head of the history department at Kelly College in Tavistock for five years, followed by fourteen years at Culham College of Education as principal lecturer and head of the history department. He was able to combine his love of cricket with his college duties by instituting the biannual cricket matches between the History Department and his village cricket team of North Moreton for whom he was wicketkeeper and captain. One regularly told story was that he conducted an interview out on the cricket square when one potential teaching student applied who was already on the books of Yorkshire Cricket Club! Unfortunately for Howat, the student did not take up the place which was presumably offered to him, but did go on to have a reasonably successful cricket career. He had an abrupt tutoring technique and once (at least) locked the door when the time of his tutor group was due to start which left only one student in the room (at the magnificent mansion of Nuneham) to enjoy his didactic and engaging teaching style. Meanwhile, he undertook a research degree on "the place of history in education" for Exeter College, Oxford. He also turned his hand to the world of publishing, for a time being general editor of the Historical Division of Pergamon Press.

He wrote several school textbooks, and was general editor of a Dictionary of World History (1973), a massive project which involved working closely with an advisory board that included A.J.P. Taylor, Max Beloff and Asa Briggs. He also spent a year with Mitchell Beazley editing an illustrated biographical dictionary entitled Who Did What (1974).

He was Head of History at Radley College, but writing and editing were taking much of his attention, and neither he nor the school was very happy with his time there. He said: "I was not ambitious to be a headmaster and I came to resent the fact that I never had time to put pen to paper (or, more specifically, to write a book) during my years there." In 1977, he moved to a senior pastoral post at Lord Williams's School, Thame, which gave him more time to pursue his other interests. For a short period he was also a visiting professor at Western Kentucky University. He also acted as an Oxbridge Board examiner. He retired from teaching in 1985.

He was an associate editor of the 2004 edition of the Oxford Dictionary of National Biography. He supplied seventy entries himself, many on former cricketers.

== Cricket literature ==
He covered schools cricket for The Daily Telegraph for many years, as well as for The Cricketer. His retirement from academia gave him more time for his cricket writing, and he produced several well received biographies of famous players. That on Learie Constantine, whom he had first met when at Glenalmond College, won the Cricket Society's golden jubilee award. His last book was his autobiography, Cricket All My Life. This was published only a few months before his death and refers to his poor health although it ended on a positive note with a reference to his return to Lord's for a committee meeting and how he "was coming home".

He was an MCC member for over 40 years. He chaired the club's publishing working party. He seemed well-qualified to serve on the arts and library sub-committee, but he did not get on with the sub-committee's chairman, E.W. Swanton. Howat played club cricket as a wicket-keeper for Moreton CC in Oxfordshire until he was 77. He was associated with the club for almost fifty years.

== Family ==
He had three children: David, Gillian and Michael. Michael played first-class cricket for Cambridge University as a medium-fast bowler, appearing in the University Match in 1977 and 1980. Gerald was the Chairman of TASS (The Abingdon School Society), where his sons were educated.

== Death ==
Howat died at Oxford on 10 October 2007 at age 79. His Independent obituarist wrote:

You had to be quick to keep up with Gerald Howat. The short, staccato sentences were delivered at machine-gun pace... It reflected a fecund and restless mind.

== Bibliography ==
- The Story of Health (with Anne Howat), Pergamon Press, 1967.
- Who Did What: The Mitchell Beazley Illustrated Biographical Dictionary (editor), Mitchell Beazley, 1974, ISBN 0-85533-016-3.
- Stuart and Cromwellian Foreign Policy, A C Black, 1974, ISBN 0-7136-1450-1.
- Learie Constantine, Allen & Unwin, 1975, ISBN 0-04-920043-7.
- Village Cricket, David Charles, 1980, ISBN 0-7153-7727-2.
- Cricketer Militant: The Life of Jack Parsons, North Moreton Press, 1980, ISBN 0-9506957-0-X.
- Culham College History (with Leonard Naylor), Culham Educational Foundation, 1982, ISBN 0-907957-01-3.
- Walter Hammond, Allen & Unwin, 1984, ISBN 0-04-796082-5.
- Plum Warner, Unwin Hyman, 1987, ISBN 0-04-440023-3.
- Len Hutton: The Biography, Heinemann, 1988, ISBN 0-434-98150-8.
- Cricket's Second Golden Age: The Hammond-Bradman Years, Hodder & Stoughton, 1989, ISBN 0-340-42345-5.
- Cricket Medley, Sports History Publishing, 1993, ISBN 1-898010-00-5.
- Cricket All My Life (autobiography), Methuen, 2006, ISBN 978-0-413-77624-2,
