= Ruth Nalmakarra =

Indigenous Australian artist

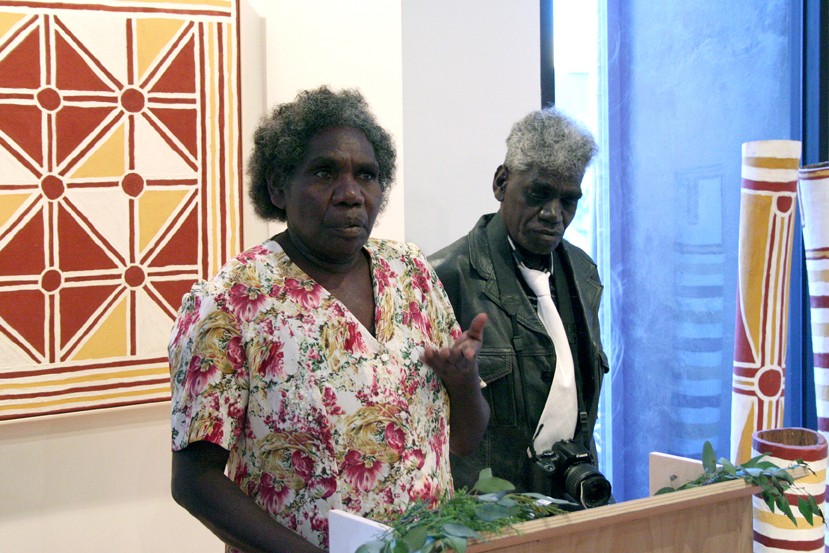
- Ruth Nalmakarra and Joe Dhamanydji at the opening of the exhibition Goyurr Manda Dja'nkawu and the Morning Star at Mossenson Galleries, Melbourne, January 2007
- Born: March 16, 1954 (age 72); Galiwin'ku (Elcho Island)
- Known for: Indigenous Australian art
- Relatives: Mandanggala Garrawurra (father)

Ruth Nalmakarra (born 1954) is an Indigenous Australian artist known for her weaving, painting, and community leadership.

== Biography ==
Ruth Nalmakarra was born in 1954 at Galiwin'ku (Elcho Island) in Arnhem Land, Australia. She moved to Milingibi in the late 1960s. She is a member of the Garrawurra Liyagauwumirr clan. After the death of Nalmakarra's father, Madanggala Garrawurra, her uncle Nupurray Garrawurra raised her and her siblings. Two of her brothers are named Mickey Durrng Garrawurra and Tony Dhanyala. Nalmakarra's father, Madanggala Garrawurra, was a renowned artist who painted the Dijirri-didi design, a sacred clan design used in the Ngarra ceremony. Before his passing, he entrusted Nalmakarra and her family with the knowledge and authority to continue this important artistic tradition. Nupurray's other children include artists Margaret Rarru, Lena Walunydjanalil, and Helen Ganalmirrawuy.

== Career ==
Throughout her career as an artist, Ruth Nalmakarra has been a weaver, painter, and curator. She has been weaving since she was a little girl, and was later taught painting by her family. From 1988 to 1993, she was a teacher's aid and tutor at Milingimbi Primary School, and from 2001 to 2003, she worked as an administration assistant and researcher at the Elcho Island Knowledge Centre.

Nalmakarra's late-brother Mickey Durrng, and his brother, Tony Dhanyala were the only people authorized to paint the Dijirri-didi: the Liyagauwumirr's clan design that is painted on the body during the Ngarra cleansing ceremony, in which the Liyagauwumirr paint their bodies and ceremonial objects. The Ngarra ceremony is not only a mortuary ritual, but also a celebration of regeneration in which the people remember the travels of the Dja'nkawu Sisters. Prior to his death in 2006, Durrng made the decision to pass the knowledge and the authority to paint the Dijirri-didi design to his Nalmakarra and her family, not because there were no available men to pass the knowledge to, but because he believed Nalmakarra would be the best person to ensure the continuation of the stories. In 2009, Nalmakarra worked with researchers to help identify people and objects from Milingimbi that were photographed and collected during the 1948 American-Australian Scientific Expedition to Arnhem Land.

Nalmakarra held a position as assistant manager at the Milingimbi Art and Culture Centre from 2005 to 2009, in addition to being an artist and member of the board. In 2008, Nalmakarra curated the show, Yunumu: The Garrawarra artists of Milingimbi at Collingwood's Mossenson Galleries. Currently, she is a special advisor to the board of directors at Arnhem, Northern and Kimberley Artists (ANKA), the peak advocacy and support body for Aboriginal artists and Art Centres across Northern Australia. Nalmakarra has been involved with ANKA since 2007. In December 2018, Nalmakarra participated in a two-week Indigenous education program at the University of Melbourne, the first accredited university program in Australia designed specifically for Indigenous arts workers from remote communities. The program aimed to enhance local Indigenous management of cultural collections in remote communities.

== Style, works, and impact ==
Nalamkara’s style was passed down from her brother, Mickey Durrng, he used a lot of body art painting in his work. Ruth took the style and flourished. Ruth Nalamkarra’s work was all about connecting the past and the present through art and it is seen in her artwork and her actions to further the communities around her. Ruth’s rotatable style of weaving which she picked up as a young girl and through the family traditions also learned to paint as well. Nalmakara would learn to paint from the scared Ŋarra ceremony where the clan did body clan designs. Ruth tends to use a weaving style with different geometric patterns and shapes influenced by the beautiful clan designs. Nalmakarra's weaving incorporates different geometric patterns and shapes influenced by clan designs used in the sacred Ŋarra ceremony.

Nalmakarra puts effort into acknowledging her elders and showing respect for their stories and teachings that come from the deep meaning behind them. She recognizes the responsibility elders have in passing on knowledge to chosen individuals to keep the stories strong.

Her ability to hold the sacred stories of the past into her art, Ruth is quoted saying:

Elders have a responsibility to choose who should take over the leadership to carry on the stories. It happens this way because people are passing every day, every month, every year. In that case, before they pass, they have to call on those people that they can choose to keep the stories strong. They look to people with strong feelings and a strong voice. They appoint them to know and to carry on the story.

Nalmakara puts in the effort to acknowledge her elders and show why she respects their stories and why others should respect and learn about the many teachings that come from the deep meaning behind the stories.

Ruth is also involved in modern projects like the MEG’s (Musée d'ethnographie de Genève) Plan to “reconnect collections and source communities.” Their mission is to show through the educational lens, they teach the community through hands-on workshops and exhibits. She participates in teaching the community about traditional weaving techniques through hands-on workshops and exhibits to pass knowledge on to younger generations.

Nalmakarra has worked with researchers to help link objects and photographs from the 1948 American-Australian Scientific Expedition to Arnhem Land with the people and stories behind them. In 2008, she identified baskets collected on the Expedition according to their moiety divisions of Dhuwa and Yirritja based on the designs. Nalmakarra and other elders from Milingimbi, including the late Joe Mawunydjil and Joe Neparrnga Gumbula, have been able to identify individuals in photographs from the Expedition. This assists in determining the makers of specific objects collected in 1948.

== Collections ==
- National Gallery of Victoria, Melbourne
- 2005: Twined Together: Kunmadj Njalehnjaleken, Injalak Arts and Crafts, Gunbalanya, Australia.

== Significant exhibitions ==
- 2012: Sharing Our Spirit. Woolloongabba Art Gallery, Brisbane, Australia.
- 2017: Ochre. NOMAD Art Gallery, Darwin, Australia.
- 2020: long water. Museum of Modern Art Australia (MOMAA), Melbourne, Australia.
