= Yakou Piao-se =

Customary event in Yakou, Nanlang, Guandong, China

Yakou Piao-se (simplified Chinese: 崖口飘色; traditional Chinese: 崖口飄色; pinyin: Yákǒu Piāosè; Jyutping: Ngaai^{4}hau^{2} Piu^{1}sik^{1}) is a traditional festival activity in the village Yakou, Nanlang, Zhongshan, in the Pearl River Delta of Guangdong Province, China. In 2008, the Chinese government added Yakou Piao-se to the official list of China's state-level, intangible, cultural heritage items.

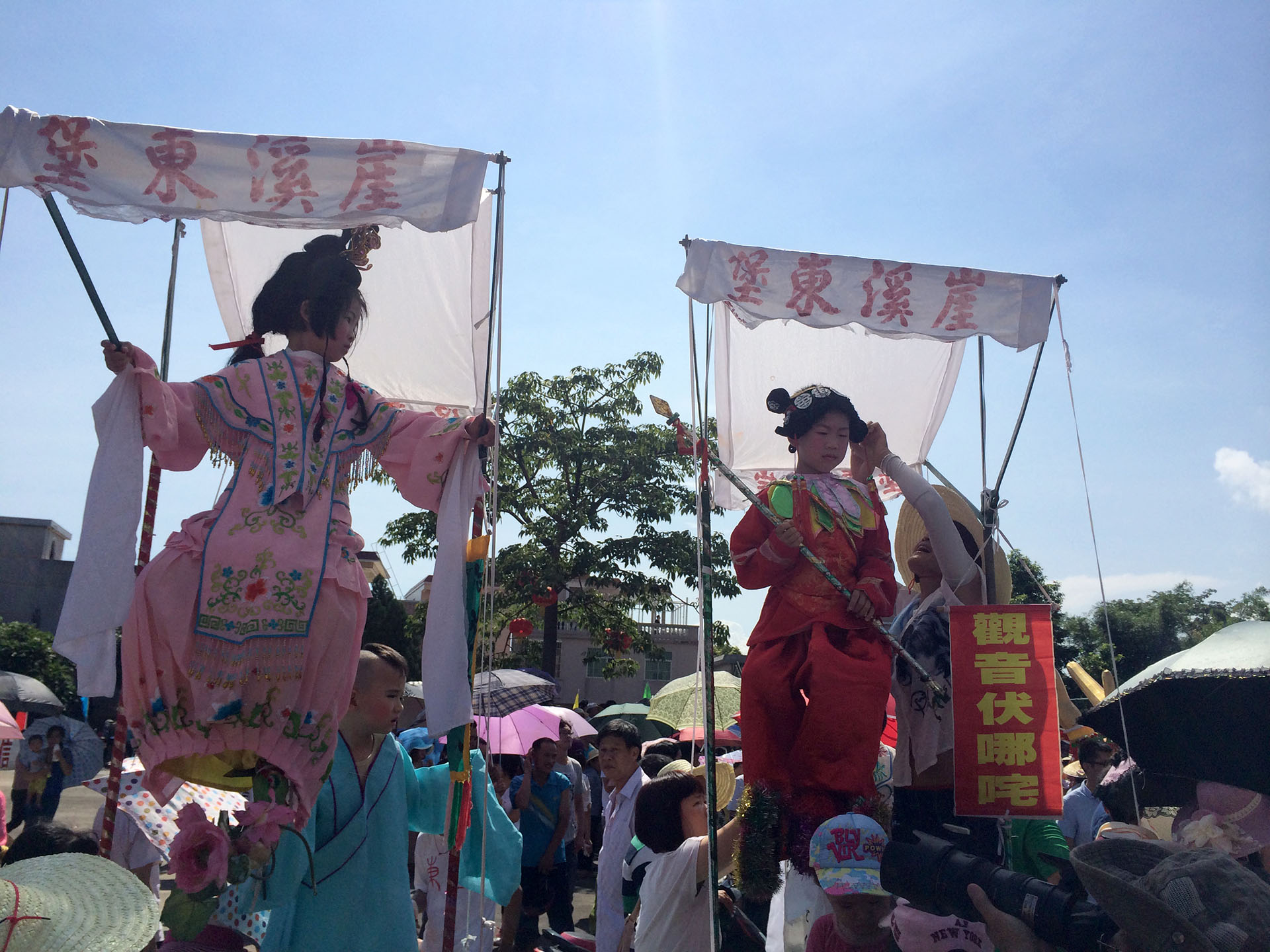
Performance of the story "the Goddess Guanyin Catching Nezha"

== History ==
There are several versions of the origin of Yakou Piao-se. The first version is that at one time the village of Yakou suffered from frequent floods because of its coastal location and low altitude. To solve the problem, villagers began to carry a paper-made statue of Bodhisattva and walk around the village to pray for a good harvest. It was in the late Ming Dynasty that people began to use small children dressed up as bodhisattva to replace the paper-made effigy.

Another version concerns a very moving story. It is said that a long time ago, probably in the Tang Dynasty, a serious plague hit Yakou village. A very kind-hearted couple, Mr. and Mrs. Tan, offered free soup and medicine to the villagers. The villagers were so grateful to them that they called Mr. and Mrs. Tan the "living Buddha". Unfortunately, the couple died of exhaustion from gathering herbs and making medicine. To honor the memory of their great sacrifices, people in Yakou village began parading the paper-made bodhisattva statue around the village on May 6 of the lunar calendar. The tradition gradually developed into the festival Piao-se.

At the end of the Yuan Dynasty, many people from the Central Plains moved to the southern area to escape from war. Settling in Yakou village, the migrants combined the art form of the Central Plains area with the indigenous Baiyue tradition of Piao-se and transformed the festival.

== Form ==
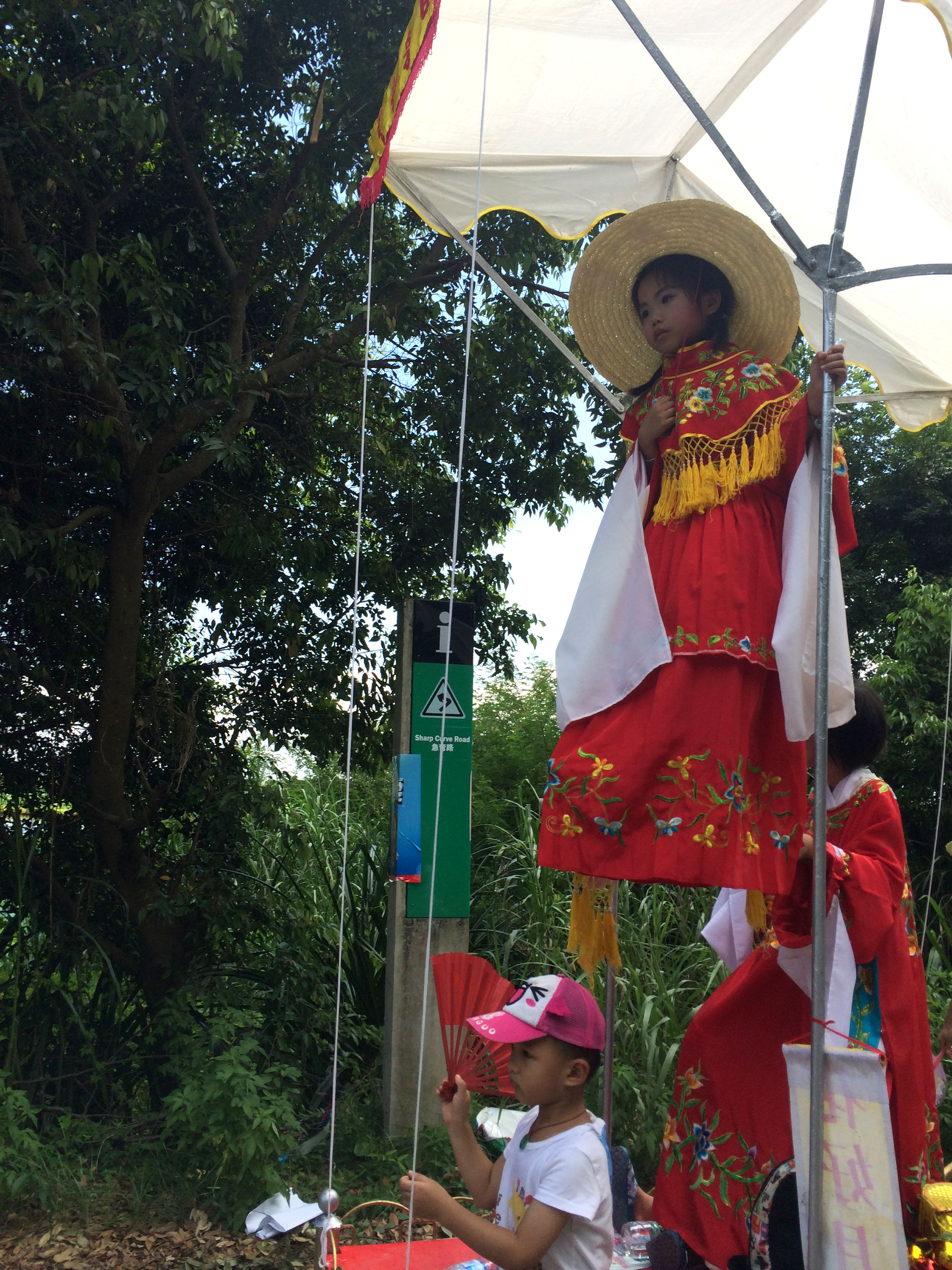
A child performing Piao-se

The character piao (飘) means "floating" in Chinese and the character se (色) means "delicate disguises" in old Chinese.

During Piao-se, people push a special decorated, wheeled cart around the village. The Piao-se performers (2 or 3 small children), wearing heavy makeup and special costumes, stand or sit on the iron shelving fixed on the cart. The artists sometimes perform gestures which help identify the figures they are representing.

The cart is actually a special wheeled cabinet called a "Se cabinet" (色柜). On top of the Se cabinet, there is a vertical steel bar called Se Geng, which is about 1 meter long. It was specifically designed to support 1 to 3 children while lending stability to the Se cabinet. The "Se Geng" also serves to protect the young performers from falling and getting hurt. Most sections of the "Se Geng" are covered by the costumes while the parts out of the costume are disguised as spears and swords for aesthetics.

Yakou consists of eight smaller villages, and each village has one piao-se group. Every year on May 6 of the lunar calendar, different villages will send their groups and they will perform the piao-se parade together across the streets and the field. The colorfulness of the parade and the green of the rice fields mix to create a spectacular scene.

== Innovation ==
In the late Qing Dynasty and the early Republic period, many villagers in Yakou went to Hong Kong or even Southeast Asia to make a living. When they returned home, they not only brought back money, but also many of the techniques and customs they learned from other areas. With their contribution, the content of the Piao-se was enriched.

One of the unique forms which made the Yakou Piao-se special is the "Swinging Se,” which enables performers to swing during their routine. The innovation was brought by a villager named Tan Heyi, who had previously made his living in Southeast Asia. When he was watching the Piao-se performance while visiting his relatives in Yakou village, he thought of the popular activity "swinging" in the Southeast Asia. Tan Heyi improved the Piao-se forms by using the design of swinging and thanks to his creativity, the unique form "Swinging Se" was invented.

In the early 20th century, the villagers who had worked as welding workers in Hong Kong also made great contributions to innovation in Piao-se techniques with their skills.

== Culture ==
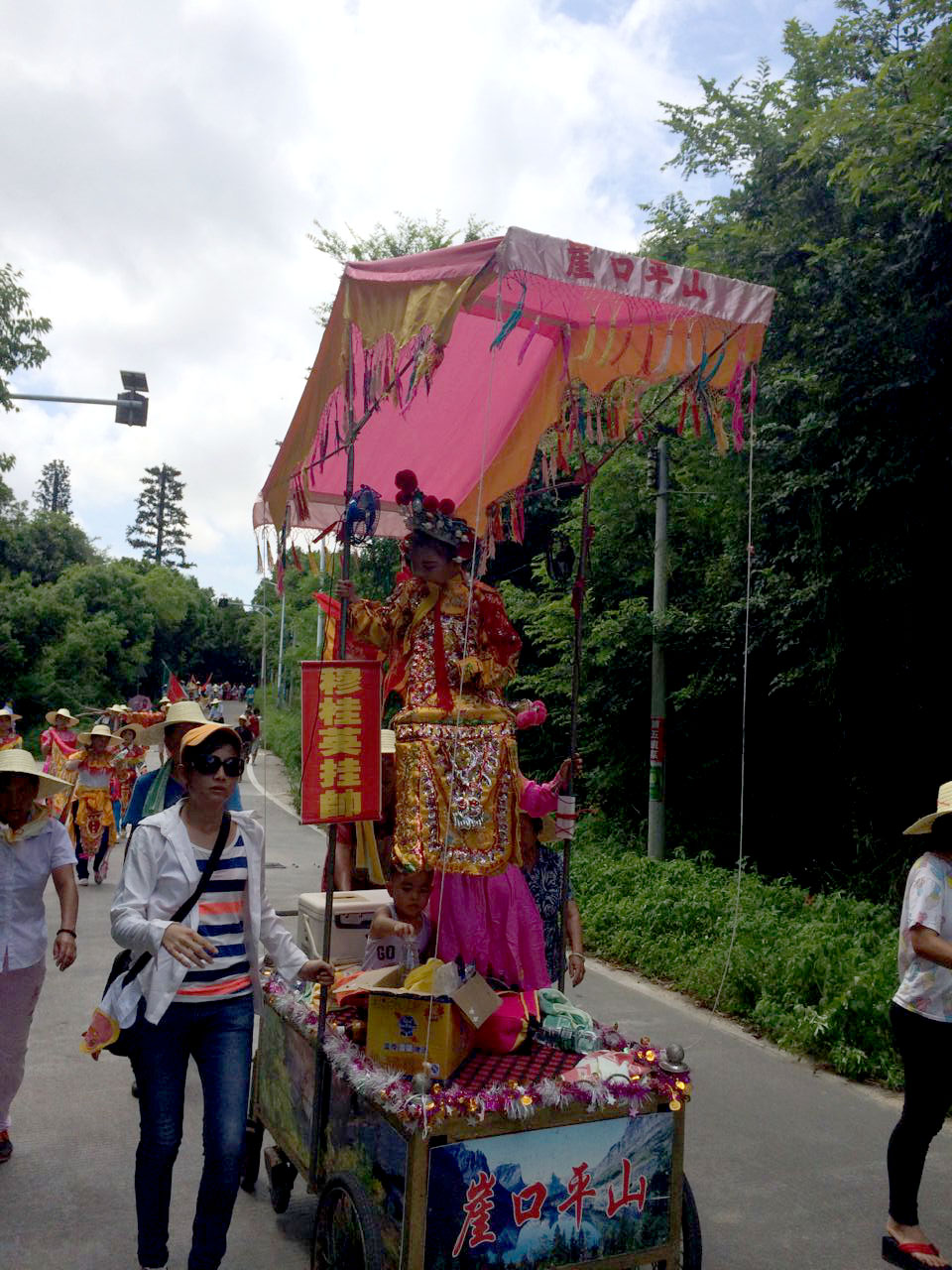
Performance of the story Lady General Mu Takes Command

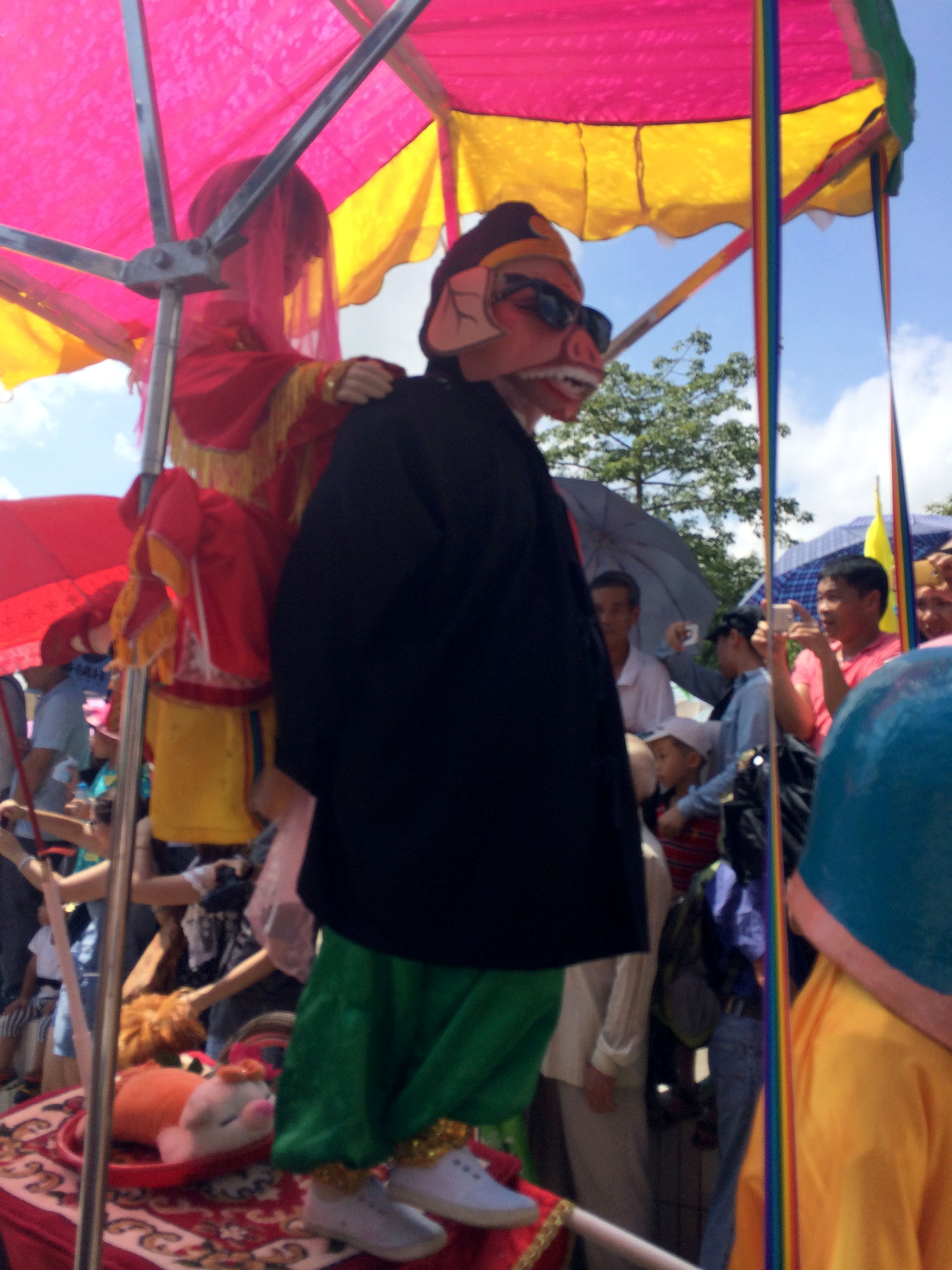
Performance of the Piggy Carrying his Wife on His Back

Many famous figures that are performed in the Piao-se are from Chinese historical and mythological stories, including the Goddess Chang'e "Flying to the Moon", "Lady General Mu Takes Command", "The Goddess Guanyin Catching Nezha", "Prince Nezha's Triumph Against Dragon King", "Goddess Marriage", Journey to the West, Legend of the White Snake, ghost stories in Liaozhai, as well as others.

== Local features ==
As well as the Piao-se performances, Yakou people also perform dragon dances, lion dances and Kylin dances in the Piao-se parade. The dragon used in Yakou is the wooden dragon. At a length of 50 meters, the wooden dragon is made of many boards. Despite its length and material, the dragon can move flexibly. For the Kylin dance, Yakou people used a Kylin which is two or three times bigger than people in other area of Guangdong use, and the performance is lively and natural.

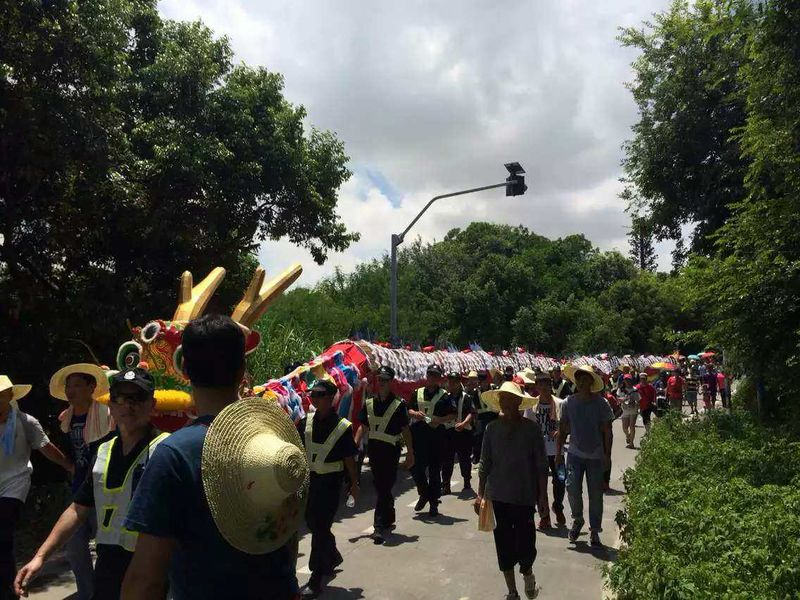
The dragon dance in the Piao-se parade

== Special customs ==
"Passing through the dragon" means children squeeze through the long section of the dragon. They dance and pray that they will grow up healthy.
