= Michael Howat =

English cricketer

Personal information
- Full name: Michael Gerald Howat
- Born: 2 March 1958 (age 68); Tavistock, Devon, England
- Batting: Right-handed
- Bowling: Right-arm medium-fast
- Relatives: Gerald Howat (father)

Domestic team information
- Years: Team
- 1977–1980: Cambridge University

Career statistics
| Competition | First-class | List A |
|---|---|---|
| Matches | 26 | 2 |
| Runs scored | 194 | 2 |
| Batting average | 10.21 | 2.00 |
| 100s/50s | –/– | –/– |
| Top score | 32 | 2 |
| Balls bowled | 2,942 | 54 |
| Wickets | 26 | 0 |
| Bowling average | 60.00 | – |
| 5 wickets in innings | – | – |
| 10 wickets in match | – | – |
| Best bowling | 3/39 | – |
| Catches/stumpings | 7/– | –/– |
- Source: Cricinfo, 4 September 2019

Michael Gerald Howat (born Michael Gerald Henderson-Howat, born 2 March 1958) is an English former cricketer.

== Life and education ==
Howat is the son of the cricketer and schoolmaster Gerald Howat. He was born in March 1958 at Tavistock. He was educated at Abingdon School from 1968 until 1975.

== Cricket career ==
Howat started playing cricket for the under-13 team before being selected for the second XI in 1971 and the first XI by 1974. He won the Morris Cup for the best all-rounder and broke the School record by claiming 62 wickets in one season. He was also a competent field hockey player. He later studied at Magdalene College, Cambridge.

While studying at Cambridge, he made his debut in first-class cricket for Cambridge University against Leicestershire at Fenner's in 1977. He played first-class cricket for Cambridge until 1980, making 26 appearances. In his 26 matches, he took 26 wickets with his right-arm medium-fast bowling at a high average of 60.00, with best figures of 3 for 39. With the bat, he scored 194 runs at a batting average of 10.21, with a high score of 32. In addition to playing first-class cricket while at Cambridge, he also made two List A one-day appearances for the Combined Universities cricket team, making a single appearance apiece in the 1978 and 1980 Benson & Hedges Cup.

== See also ==
- List of Old Abingdonians
