= Howard Island =

Island of the Northern Territory, Australia

Coordinates: 12.141°S 135.4013°E

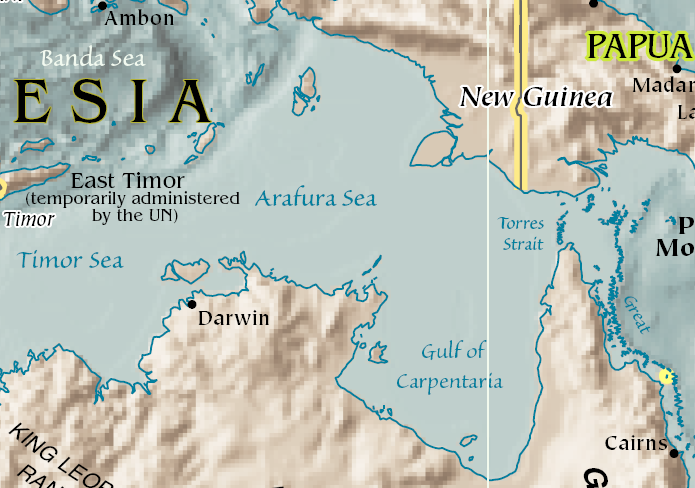
Map of the Arafura Sea, location of the Howard Island

Howard Island known as Laŋarra Island to the Yolngu people is an island in the Arafura Sea, Northern Territory, Australia. It belongs to East Arnhem Region, and is evenly divided between Gumurr Gatjirrk Ward in the west and Gumurr Marthakal Ward in the east. The only settlements are two family outstations. Nikawu is located on the eastern end, and Langarra, the main settlement, on the north coast in the western part of the island.

Howard Island is 39 km long and maximally 10 km wide. The area is 280.3 km^{2}. It is separated from the mainland by a long and narrow marine channel, which is only 70 m wide in places. 1600 m northeast of Howard Island is Elcho Island, and 1400 m to the southwest is Banyan Island.

Artist Mickey Durrng spent much of his life there.
