= Dillybag =

Traditional Australian Aboriginal woven bag

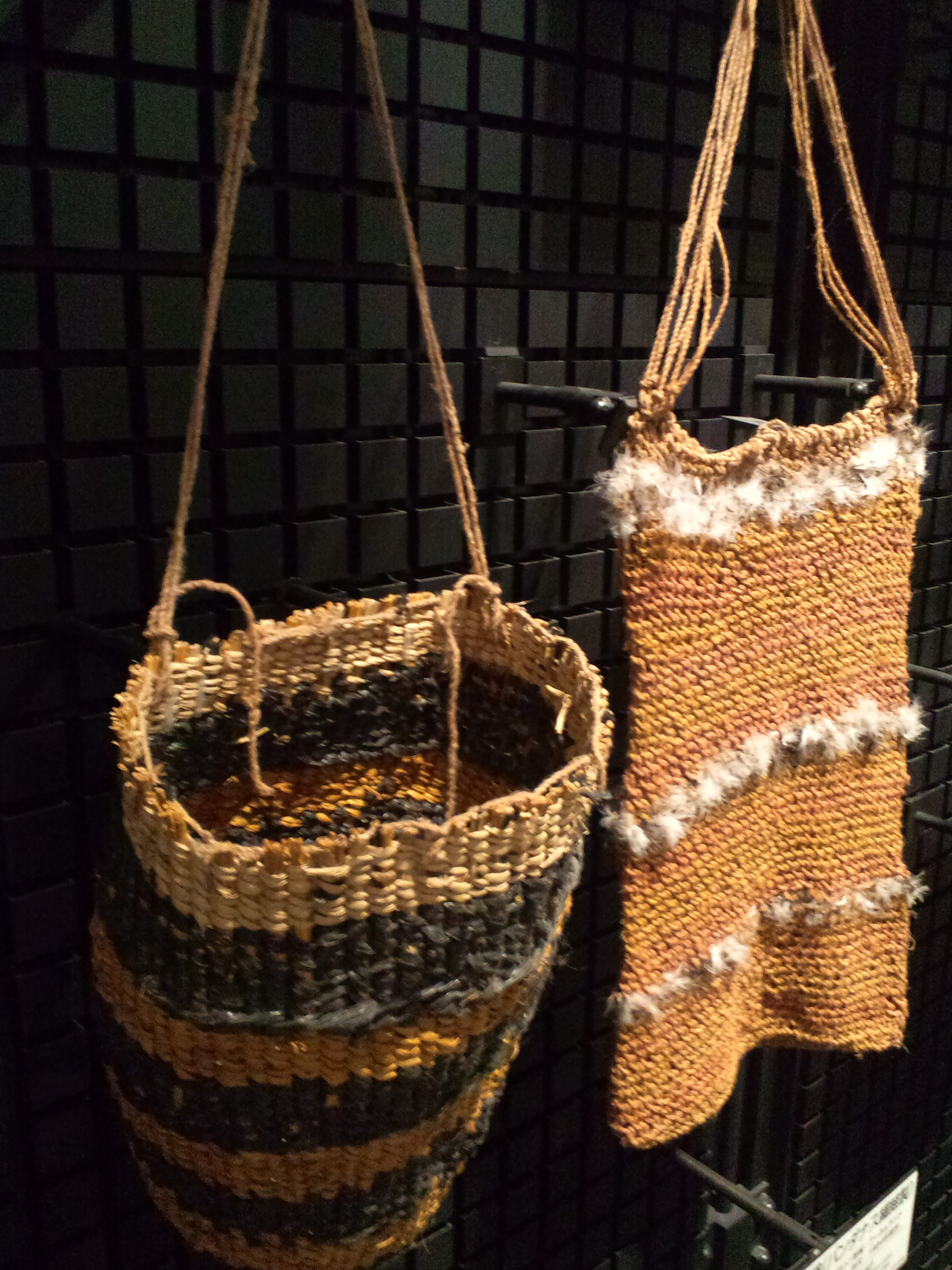
Dillybags from Arnhem Land

A dillybag or dilly bag, also known as a mindirr or bulbbe, among other names, is a traditional Australian Aboriginal bag generally woven from plant fibres. Dillybags are mainly designed and used by women to gather and transport food, and are most commonly found in the northern parts of Australia.

== Etymology and variant names ==
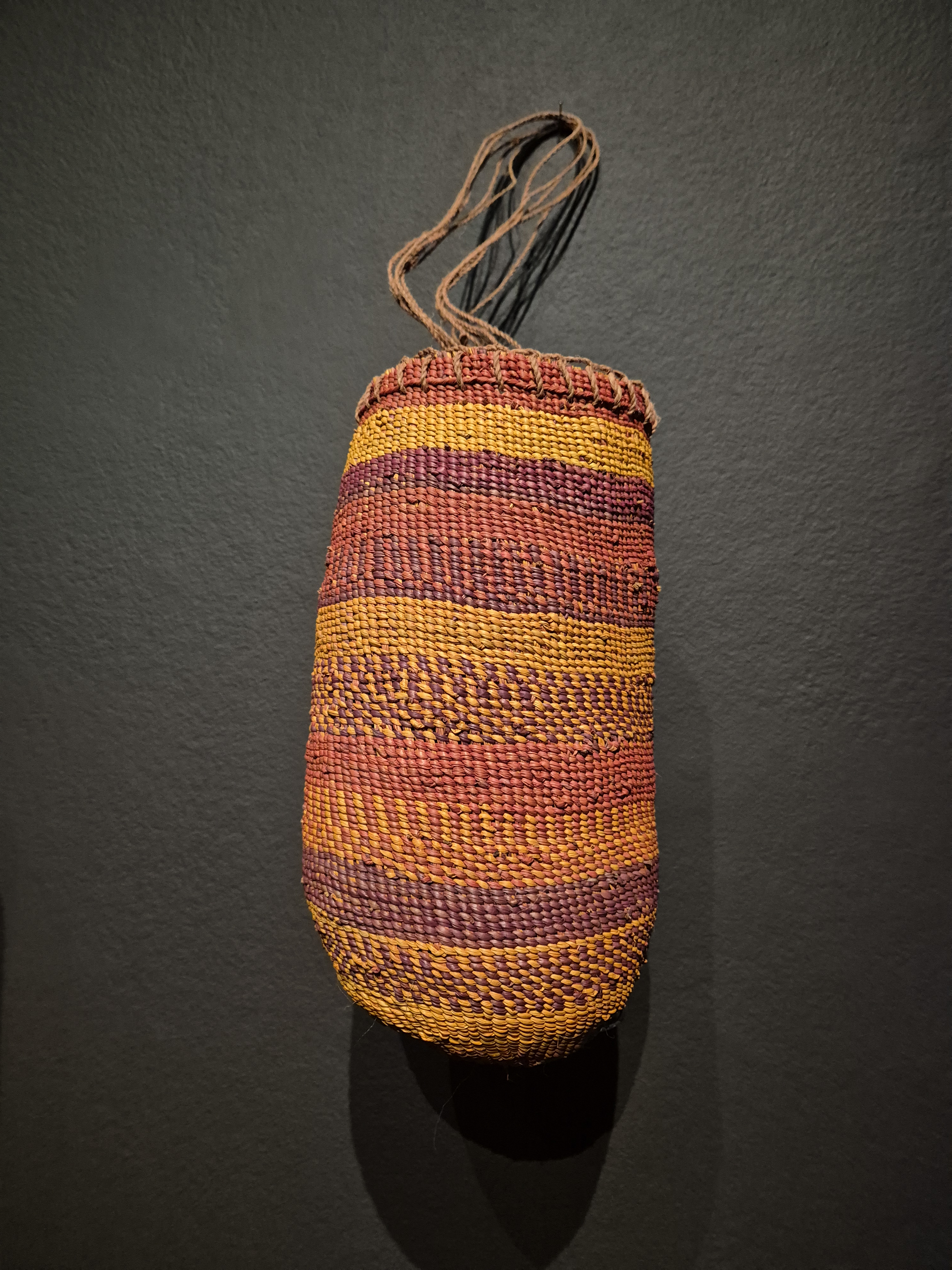
Boduk mindirr (2020) by Margaret Rarru Garrawurra

Dilly comes from the Turrubal language (of the Jagera people of South East Queensland) word dili, which refers to both the bag and the plants from which it is made. Other names used by other Aboriginal peoples include mindirr (central Arnhem Land); bulbbe (Gaagudju people of west Arnhem Land); and numalga or djerrk (Kunwinjku people of west Arnhem Land); and bindan (Bundjalung people of New South Wales).

== History ==
Fibre weaving has long been used to make various artefacts in northern Australia. The oldest known sequence of rock paintings in western Arnhem Land, dating from around 20,000 years ago, show dillybags. Rock art on Injalak Hill shows the ancestor Yingarna (Rainbow Serpent) carrying 15 painted dillybags. Bags may be painted or decorated with feathers as sacred objects for various ceremonies, and continue to be produced using pandanus leaves.

== Production and description ==
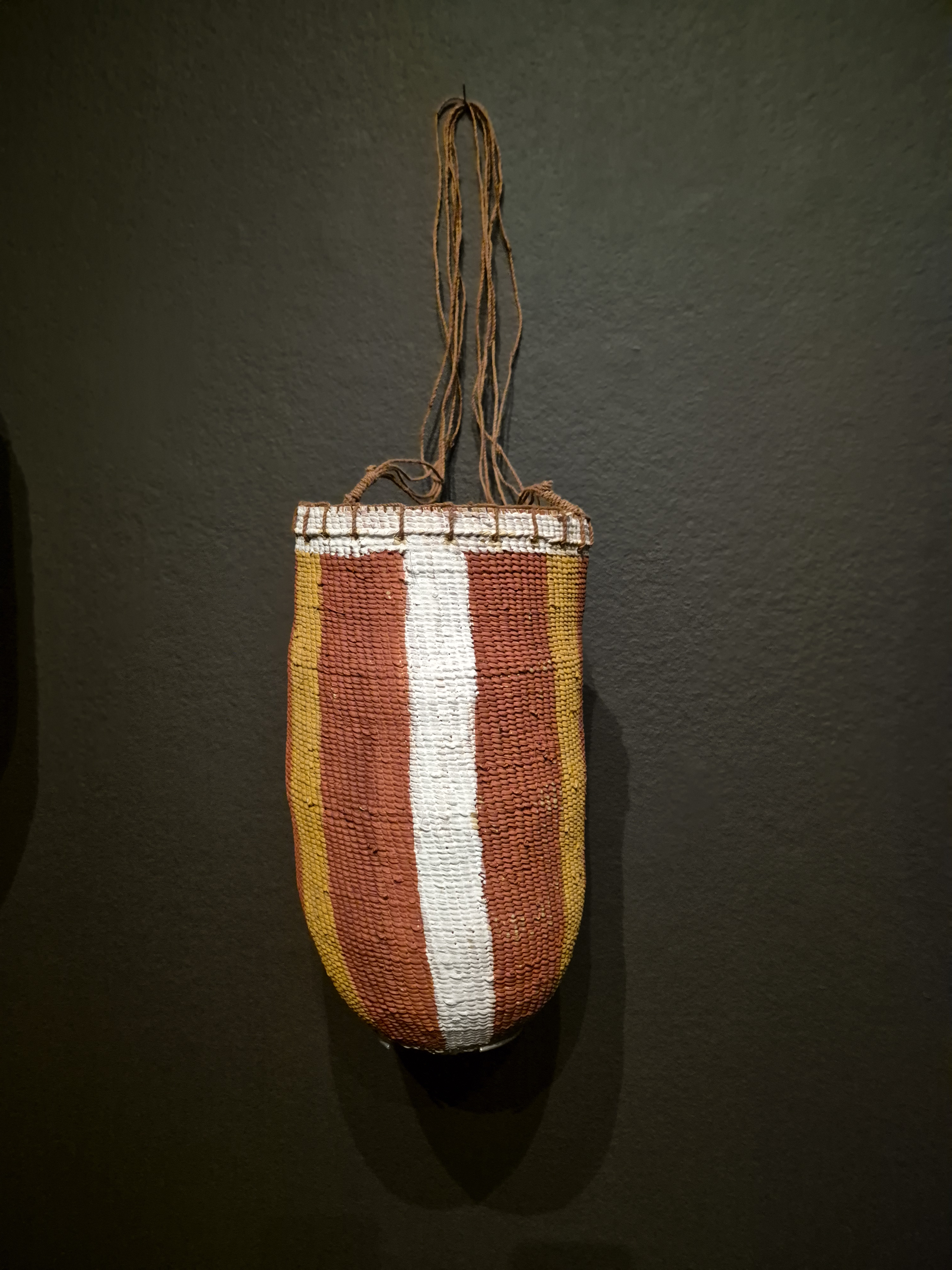
Painted mindirr (2020) created by Helen Ganalmirriwuy Garrawurra, using white ochre

Most dillybags from Arnhem Land are conical in shape, often with a cord attached for carrying. Others are worn like a satchel with a cord around the neck. One example, collected in 1905 from Boulia in south-western Queensland and held in The Australian Museum in Sydney, is made from woollen blanket thread and is almost semi-circular in shape, with a small opening looped with cord for hanging over the carrier's shoulder.

Natural pigments such as charcoal, pipe clay, and ochres may be used as paint to decorate the baskets. Natural dyes made from plants are also used; for example, the colour purple is used in the area from Wugularr to Katherine, in the Northern Territory.

Traditional dillybags are woven out of tough dried grasses, bark, leaves, stems, roots, human hair, animal fur, and animal sinew. In Arnhem Land, Queensland, and northern Western Australia, plant species of the Pandanus genus are often used. According to Kunwinjku woman Garnbaladj Nabegeyo, Kunwinjku women use banyan root, which they cook until it's black, and also use grass for making their djerrk (dillybags), while Gagadju use the bark, not root, to make their string. The bark of the stringybark tree is also used for the handle.

== Uses ==
=== Practical uses ===
Although mainly used by women to gather food, they are sometimes used by men, such as to help carry tools for hunting. Some dillybags are used to hold personal or sacred artefacts. Today they are also produced for artistic purposes.

The 1905 example mentioned above was tightly woven, and was used to carry the chopped leaves and stems of pitjuri, which was chewed after being prepared in a specific way, and prized as a narcotic, so traded across the continent as well as being used in smoking ceremonies.

"Dillybag" is also sometimes used to describe bags that were made and used by non-Aboriginal Australians, for example, a smaller food bag carried by swagmen along with their swags.

=== Sacred and decorative purposes ===
In recreating the creation story of Djang'kawu, the Dhuwa people imbue several objects with sacred significance, representing features of the land and other things that the ancestors brought to Yalangbara. The feathered baskets (dillybags) are regarded as containers of sacred law, as they once contained the sisters' sacred objects. The men decorate their baskets, which are described as "the embodiment of their authority and land ownership", with the orange breast feathers of the lorikeet.

In recent years, the dilly bags have become an art form, demonstrating skilled artistry in weaving. Using traditional weaving techniques, the women have created new designs and used new colours, with the baskets thus becoming a form of cultural expression.

== Notable creators ==
Notable weavers of dilly bags include Margaret Rarru Garrawurra, who is also known for her bark paintings. Her mindirr are held by the Art Gallery of New South Wales and the National Gallery of Victoria.
