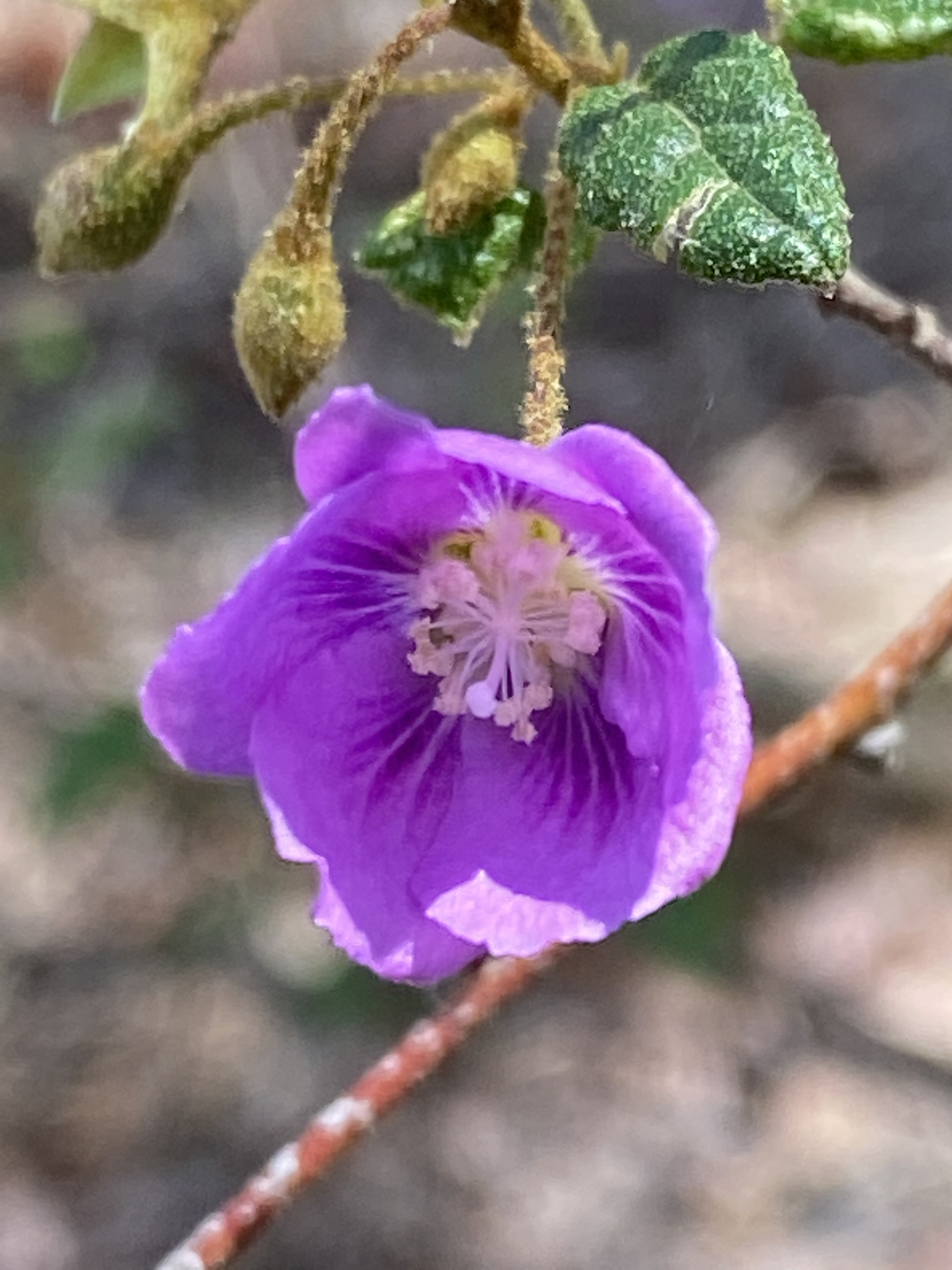
- Howittia trilocularis

Scientific classification
- Kingdom: Plantae
- Clade: Tracheophytes
- Clade: Angiosperms
- Clade: Eudicots
- Clade: Rosids
- Order: Malvales
- Family: Malvaceae
- Subfamily: Malvoideae
- Genus: Howittia; F.Muell.
- Species: H. trilocularis

Binomial name
- Howittia trilocularis F.Muell.

= Howittia =

Genus of flowering plants

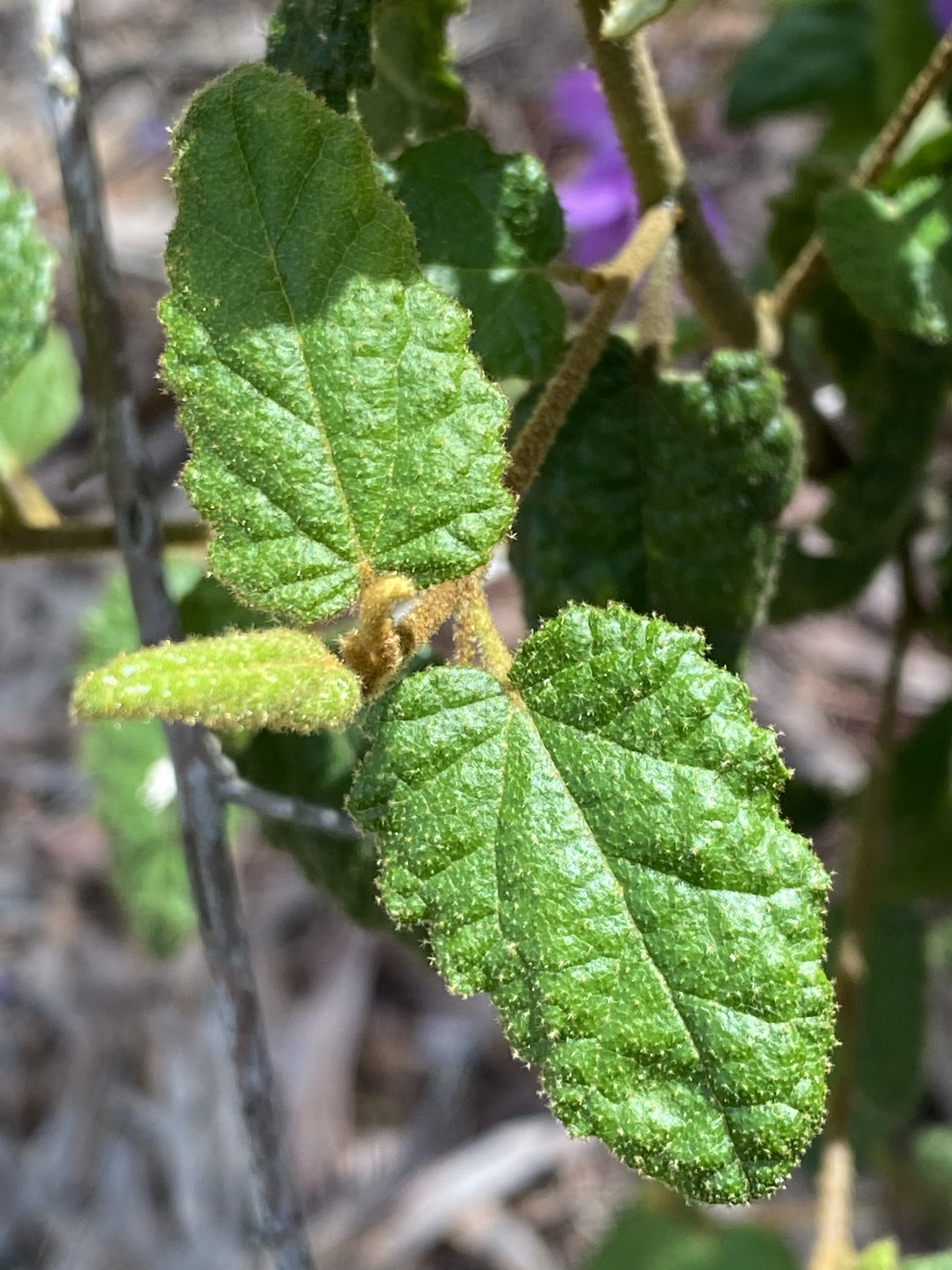
Foliage

Howittia is a genus of plant containing the single species, Howittia trilocularis, commonly known as blue howittia, and is endemic to Australia. It is a tall shrub found growing in shaded valleys and on rainforest edges, it has hairy leaves and single, purple flowers.

== Description ==
Howittia trilocularis is a spreading shrub up to 3 m (9.8 ft) high with oval to oblong-oval shaped leaves, 2.5–12 cm (0.98–4.72 in) long and 1.5–8 cm (0.59–3.15 in) wide, margins smooth, scalloped or slightly lobed. The under surface pale, white, yellow or brownish, irregularly covered with rusty or whitish star-shaped hairs, upper surface dark green. The whitish, lavender or deep mauve flowers are borne singly in the leaf axils, on a peduncle 3–4 cm (1.2–1.6 in) long and densely covered with long, matted hairs. The flowers have five petals, 1–2.5 cm (0.39–0.98 in) long on a pedicels 1.5–5 cm (0.59–1.97 in) long and yellow stamens. The calyx lobes are sharply pointed, 6–10 mm (0.24–0.39 in) long, rusty coloured with soft, star-shaped hairs. The seed capsule is rounded or indented globular shaped, 5–10 mm (0.20–0.39 in) in diameter and covered with soft, silky or star-shaped hairs. Flowering occurs from September to January.

== Taxonomy ==
Howittia trilocularis was first formally described in 1855 by Ferdinand von Mueller and the description was published in Definitions of rare or hitherto undescribed Australian plants from the type specimen which was found growing on "bushy declivities around Lake King". The genus was named after Godfrey Howitt, a Melbourne physician, in recognition of his work as an amateur botanist. The specific epithet (trilocularis) means "having three locules.

== Distribution ==
It is found growing in sheltered gullies, rainforest margins and eucalypt forests in New South Wales, Victoria and South Australia.
