= Edward La Trobe Bateman =

English painter

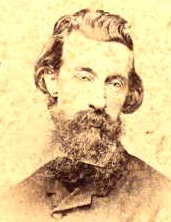
- Born: 8 January 1816; Lower Wyke, Yorkshire, England
- Died: 30 December 1897 (aged 81); Rothesay, Scotland
- Occupations: Victorian painter; watercolourist; architect; book illustrator; draughtsman; garden designer
- Known for: Garden designs in Colonial Victoria
- Movement: Pre-Raphaelite Brotherhood
- Relatives: John F. Bateman (brother); Christian H. Bateman (brother); Benjamin Latrobe (nephew); Charles La Trobe (great nephew)

Edward La Trobe Bateman (8 January 1816 – 30 December 1897) was a British Victorian painter in watercolour, architect, book illustrator, draughtsman and garden designer. He worked in Australia from 1852 to 1869, and had links with the Pre-Raphaelite Brotherhood.

== Life ==
Bateman was probably born in Lower Wyke, Yorkshire, the son of John Bateman, a manufacturer, and his wife Mary (née) La Trobe. His brothers were John Frederick Bateman, the hydraulic engineer, and Christian Henry Bateman, an Anglican Church minister and a composer of hymns. His nephew Benjamin Latrobe was a notable architect, and a great nephew, Charles La Trobe, was first lieutenant-governor of the colony of the state of Victoria in Australia.

In 1924, his great nephew, Charles, donated twelve artworks by Bateman to the Victorian government. The pencil sketches were of (Charles) La Trobe's Cottage and its grounds.

Bateman had lived in London where he had been engaged to Anna Mary Howitt the daughter of William and Mary Howitt. When Bateman visited Australia, he stayed initially with Dr Godfrey Howitt, William's brother. Bateman was in the company of his future father-in-law and two brothers of Anna Mary. When William informed Anna Mary, she broke off the engagement by a letter. He decided to stay in Australia. Edward and her older brother, Alfred, remained friends.

Bateman is attributed with design of the gardens at Barragunda – Godrey Howitt's homestead on the Mornington Peninsula; and gardens at both Chatsworth, in the Western Districts, and at Heronswood at Dromana. In 1856, Bateman was engaged to redesign the Carlton Gardens in Melbourne. The path layout and other features were built, although limitations on funding for maintenance resulted in frequent criticism.

He died in Rothesay, Scotland, where he had lived after leaving Australia in 1870.
