= USS Ontario (AT-13) =

Tugboat of the United States Navy

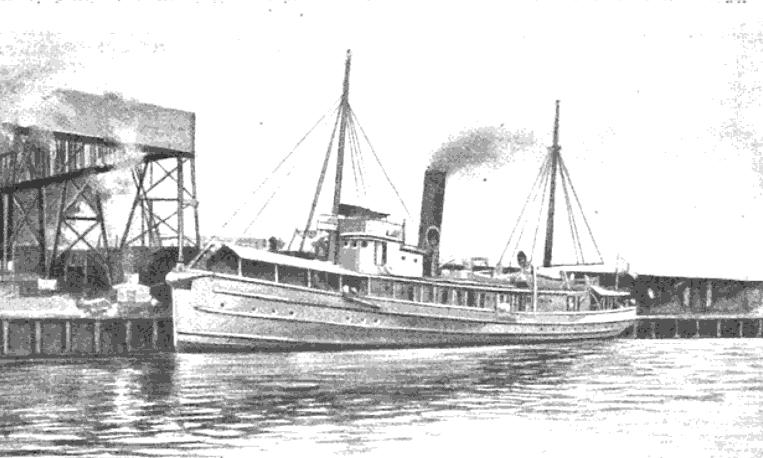
- USS Ontario (AT-13)

History

United States
- Name: Ontario (AT-13)
- Namesake: Lake Ontario
- Builder: New York Shipbuilding Company, Camden, New Jersey
- Laid down: 23 November 1911
- Launched: 11 April 1912
- Commissioned: 4 September 1912
- Decommissioned: 3 June 1946
- Stricken: 19 June 1946
- Honors and awards: 1 battle star (World War II)
- Fate: Sold to Floyd Harrington, Wilmington, California, 4 April 1947

General characteristics
- Type: Sonoma-class tugboat
- Displacement: 1,120 long tons (1,138 t)
- Length: 185 ft 2 in (56.44 m)
- Beam: 34 ft (10 m)
- Draft: 20 ft 3 in (6.17 m)
- Speed: 13.2 knots (24.4 km/h; 15.2 mph)
- Complement: 42
- Armament: 2 × machine guns

The third USS Ontario (AT–13), a single screw seagoing tug, was laid down by the New York Shipbuilding Company, Camden, New Jersey on 23 November 1911, launched on 11 April 1912, and commissioned at Philadelphia Navy Yard on 4 September 1912.

== World War I ==
The finest development in naval tugboats up to that time, Ontario served as part of the Atlantic Fleet for the first five years following commissioning. The ship operated all along the Atlantic Coast and in the Caribbean in support of Fleet exercises and did auxiliary work in various ports and naval stations. When the United States entered World War I in April 1917, the tugboat steamed along the East Coast laying anti-submarine nets and patrolling against minefields from Portsmouth, Virginia, to Portsmouth, New Hampshire and towed barges of essential war supplies to New England ports. On an unknown date she towed Schooner Charlotte W. Miller from near Bartletts Reef (near New London, Connecticut), where she had been sunk in a collision with USS D-2 on either 31 July 1917 to the vicinity of Sarahs Ledge in Long Island Sound where she sank again on 1 August. She damaged Tug Alert on July 31 while engaged with salvaging Miller. From 24 December 1917 to 2 January 1918, Ontario helped rescue grounded freighter Matanzas, an ammunition filled merchantman in danger of breaking up off Halifax, Nova Scotia and then returned to towing and netlaying duties.

== Interwar period ==
The tugboat sailed for Queenstown, Ireland in late summer 1918, and joined the Atlantic Fleet Mine Force, patrolling off Daunt Rock Light Vessel, on guard against enemy submarines until after the Armistice. She then engaged in patrol work out of Ireland, England, the Azores, Portugal, and Gibraltar into 1920 as part of Subchaser Detachment 2, U.S. Naval Forces in European Waters, removing remnants of the Great War's minefields. The ship sailed for American Samoa for duty as station ship, rescue vessel, Governor's yacht, transport, and the flagship of the United States Navy in Samoa in mid-1920.

For the next two decades, aside from regular yard periods at Pearl Harbor for repairs, Ontario operated out of the United States Naval Station Tutuila, becoming well-known amongst Samoa's young men who were encouraged to join the Navy because of her presence.

The U.S. government had placed a ship, the Ontario[iv], at the halfway point but it seems that though Earhart and Noonan saw a ship, it was another one 40 miles further north. This may have resulted in them thinking they were on the correct course when in fact they were heading to an area north of Howland Island. A message she had wanted to send before leaving Lae to the Ontario regarding the radio signals the ship should emit had not reached it.

== World War II ==
On 3 January 1941, the tug sailed for Pearl Harbor for a yard period and remained there throughout the rest of the year while she was converted from coal to oil. When the Japanese attacked Pearl, on 7 December 1941, the ship went into action with her two machine guns and was credited with downing one enemy plane. She next operated on auxiliary service to the Fleet out of Pearl Harbor into late 1943 and then joined Service Squadron 2 for duty with that force at advanced bases in the invasions of the Ellice, Gilbert, and Marshall Islands. From October 1944 to August 1945, the ship served as yard tug at Ulithi supplying the amphibious and fast carrier task forces with barge towing and other varied services during the busiest periods of the war, taking time out only to lay anchor buoys for ships along the coast of Peleliu in November–December 1944.

Ontario departed Ulithi for Eniwetok at the end of August 1945, sailing thence to Pearl Harbor and finally San Diego with two storm damaged patrol boats in tow. The old tug arrived back in the United States for the first time in 25 years on 21 December 1945 and was immediately assigned to duty as yard tug at Long Beach, California until decommissioned on 3 June 1946. She was struck from the Naval Vessel Register on 19 June 1946 and sold to Floyd Harrington, Wilmington, California on 4 April 1947.

== Honors ==
A veteran of two world wars, Ontario received 1 battle star for World War II service.
