= Leioproctus metallescens =

Scientific classification
- Kingdom: Animalia
- Phylum: Arthropoda
- Clade: Pancrustacea
- Class: Insecta
- Order: Hymenoptera
- Family: Colletidae
- Genus: Leioproctus
- Species: L. metallescens

Binomial name
- Leioproctus metallescens (Cockerell, 1914)

Synonyms
- Paracolletes metallescens Cockerell, 1914; Paracolletes atronitens Cockerell, 1914

Species of bee

Leioproctus metallescens, or Leioproctus (Leioproctus) metallescens, is a species of bee in the family Colletidae and subfamily Colletinae. It is endemic to Australia. It was described by British-American entomologist Theodore Dru Alison Cockerell in 1914.

== Description ==
Female body length is about 11 mm, male about 9 mm. Colouration is mainly black, the abdomen very dark bluish-green, with white to orange-reddish hair.

== Distribution and habitat ==
The species occurs across southern Australia. The type locality is Yallingup, Western Australia. It has also been recorded from Cape Schanck , Victoria.

== Behaviour ==
The adults are flying mellivores. Flowering plants visited by the bees include Acacia, Eucalyptus, Lycium and Melaleuca species.
