= Heronswood, Victoria =

Heritage-listed house and garden in Melbourne, Victoria, Australia

Heronswood
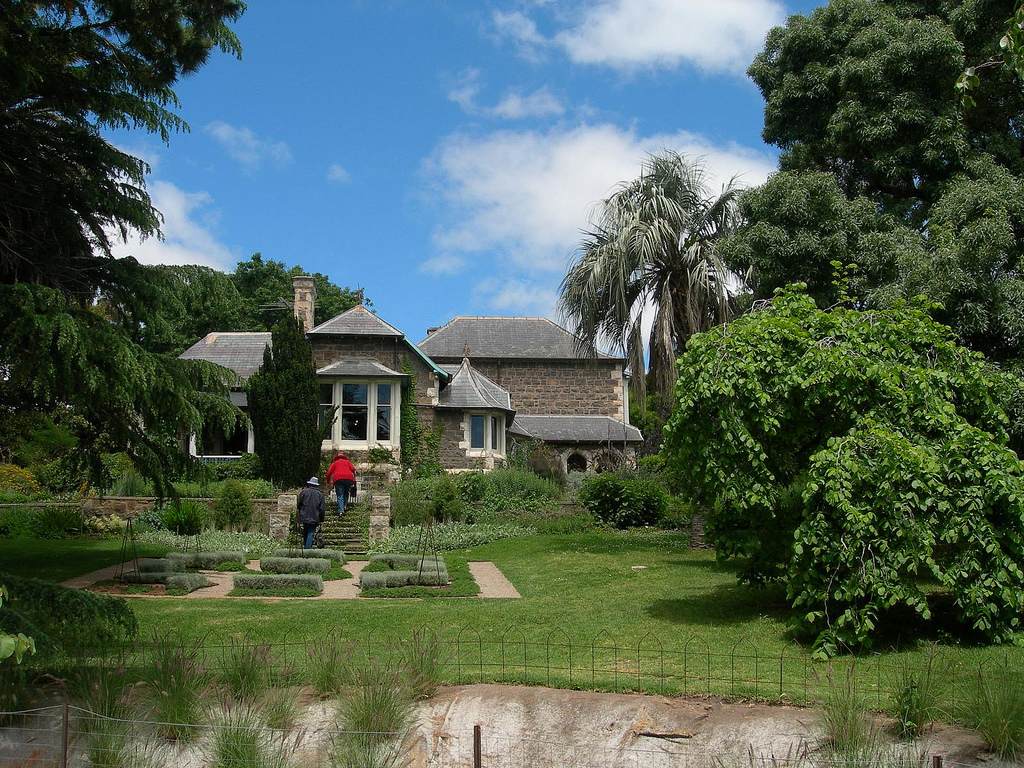
- Heronswood, in 2008

- Location of the house in Greater Metropolitan Melbourne
- Interactive map of the Heronswood area

General information
- Status: Completed
- Type: House, garden, and cottage
- Architectural style: Gothic Revival (house)
- Location: 105 Latrobe Parade, Dromana, Mornington Peninsula, Melbourne, Victoria, Australia
- Coordinates: 38°20′39″S 144°56′38″E
- Years built: Cottage: 1864; House: 1871–1876
- Completed: 1864 (cottage); 1876; 150 years ago (house)
- Renovated: 2017 (cottage)
- Client: William Hearn
- Owner: William Hearn (1871–1888); Alexander Sutherland (1888–1902); H. B. Higgins (1903–1929); anor

Technical details
- Structural system: Cottage: Drop slab
- Material: House: bluestone; limestone dressings; slate roof; Cottage: timber; wattle and daub; shingle; stone
- Grounds: 14 ha (35 acres) (1864–1964); 1.4 ha (3.5 acres) (since 1983)

Design and construction
- Architecture firm: Joseph Reed and Bates
- Other designers: Edward La Trobe Bateman; William Moat
- Known for: Extensive gardens

Website
- diggers.com.au/pages/heronswood

Victorian Heritage Register
- Official name: Heronswood
- Type: Registered place
- Designated: 11 November 1987
- Reference no.: H0664
- Heritage overlay no.: HO114
- Categories: Parks, Gardens and Trees; Residential buildings (private)

Register of the National Estate
- Official name: Heronswood Main House and Cottage
- Type: Defunct register
- Designated: 21 March 1978
- Reference no.: 5799; 5800

Heronswood is a house, extensive garden, and cottage, located at 105 Latrobe Parade, Dromana, on the Mornington Peninsula, a south-eastern suburb of Melbourne, in Victoria, Australia. Located on the traditional lands of the Bunurong people, the house is located directly above the beach where Captain Matthew Flinders landed on 27 April 1802.

The house was built in 1871 and was added to the Victorian Heritage Register on 11 November 1987; and was also added to non-statutory lists by the Victorian branch of the National Trust on 29 October 1959 and the now defunct Register of the National Estate on 21 March 1978. An 1864 drop slab cottage was also added to the defunct Register on the same date.

Since the 1980s, the garden at Heronswood has been open to the public.

== History ==
Hearn

In 1864, William Hearn purchased 14 hectares (35 acres) from Dr Godfrey Howitt, the owner of Barragunda (built c. 1866). Hearn built Heronswood between 1871 and 1876. Hearn was one of the first professors at the University of Melbourne, a political economist, jurist, conservative politician, and lecturer, and had a well-established reputation in British academic circles. He taught and strongly influenced both Sutherland and Higgins – two of the subsequent owners of Heronswood.

Sutherland

Alexander Sutherland, the second owner, was a poet and philosopher, notable as a journalist, educator, and university administrator.

Higgins

In 1903, Heronswood was sold to H. B. Higgins, a close friend of Sutherland and a former pupil of Hearn, a lawyer, a radical politician, and one of the most controversial jurists in Australian history. He remains best known for his famous Harvester Judgement which conceived the concept of the basic wage and as a founder of the arbitration system. Higgins was a highly influential politician, served briefly as the Federal Attorney General, and was a justice of the High Court of Australia from 1906 until his death in 1929.

On 5 February 1912, The Argus newspaper reported a bushfire in the vicinity of Arthurs Seat. Several residences in Dromana were destroyed.

"Last evening, at about half-past 5 o'clock, a bush fire swept a portion of the country between Dromana and Rosebud. It swept away the residences of Mrs. Coburn, Springbank, and the summer residence of Mr. Frank Cornell, despite the efforts of a large number of workers. Miss Burrell's house was saved after great exertions. The township of Rosebud is safe, and the fire is now burning in the direction of Boneo. Portion of the same fire swept towards Heronswood, the seaside residence of Mr. Justice Higgins. The fate of the residence was for some hours uncertain, but the flames were finally beaten off. Fires are still burning at Arthurs Seat and towards Mount Martha."

On 13 January 1929 at Heronswood, Higgins took his regular morning walk to Arthurs Seat. As was his habit he then read on the porch. In the early evening he collapsed and died. The Trades Hall in Melbourne flew the Australian flag at half mast. Higgins was buried in Dromana cemetery, with Anglican rites, under the Celtic cross which he had built to commemorate his son. He was survived by his wife, Mary Alice Higgins.

Subsequent owners

In 1932, W. A. and J. A. Farey, owners of a bakery in Hawthorn, purchased Heronswood for A£4,000 and continued the tradition of using the property as a retreat. In 1957, Jack and Ada Wilson, bought Heronswood and made it their permanent residence, and subdivided the property in 1964. In 1973, Heronswood was purchased by T. Shugg, later to S. Moffat, and, in 1983, to Clive Blazey AM and his wife, Penny, set on 1.4 hectares (3.5 acres). The Blazey family founded Hortico, that later merged with Yates, a subsidiary of the Dulux group.

== Description ==
=== Buildings ===
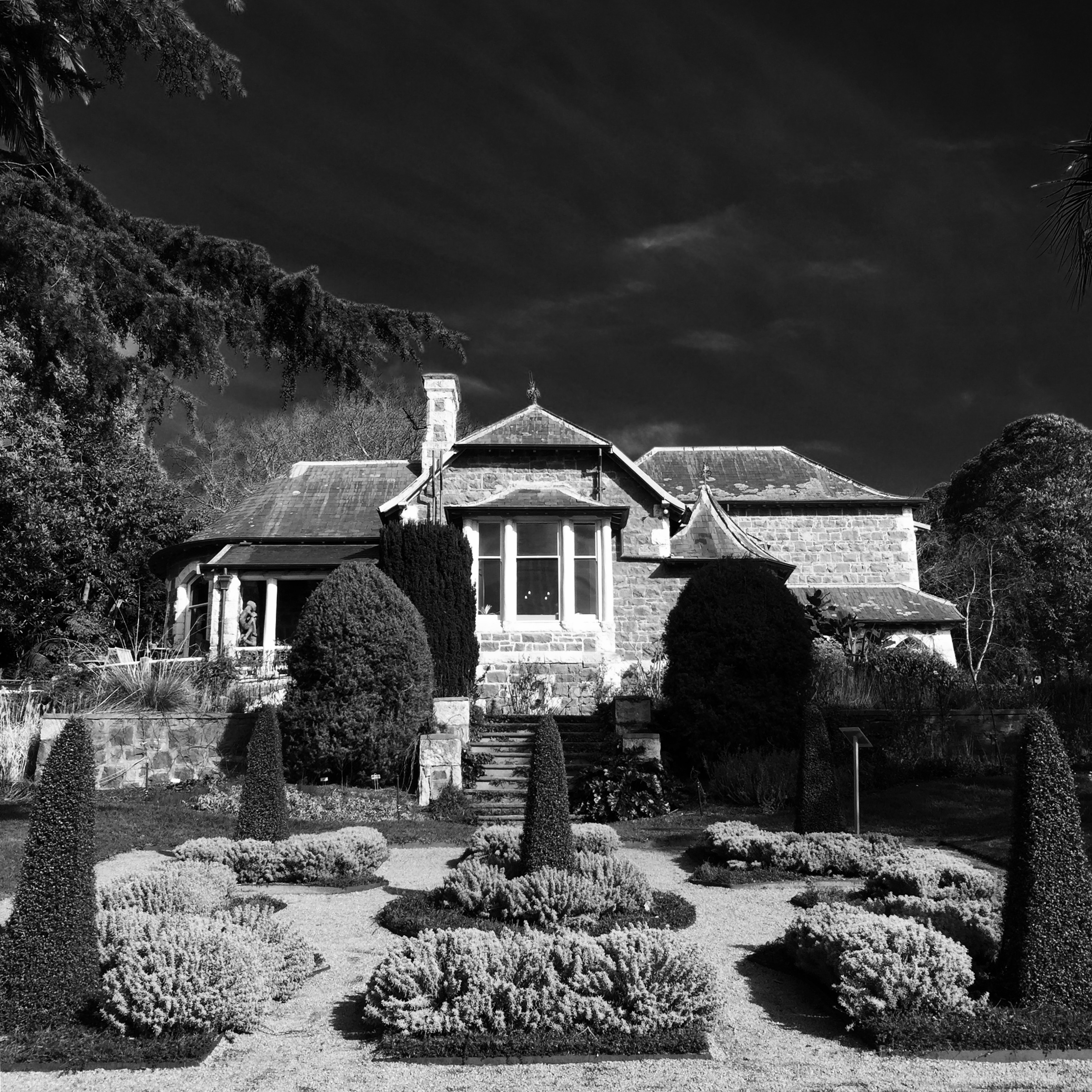
The front garden, in 2015

Mian house

The two-storey five-bedroom house was constructed of bluestone, with limestone dressings, and bell-cast slate roof in the Gothic Revival style. The single storey north-east wing, with varied windows and roof shapes, verandahs and loggia, contrasts with the two-storey south-west wings.

The authorship of Heronswood's design is unclear. (Note: The National Trust of Australia (Victoria) states that it is "…the only known complete house… of La Trobe Bateman…" However, the Register of the National Estate states "…to designs probably by Edward La Trobe Bateman…"; and both the Victorian Heritage Register and the heritage report by Graeme Butler and Associates cast doubts on Bateman's sole authorship, replicating the partnership between Bateman with Reed and Barnes that occurred at Barragunda and elsewhere.) Joseph Reed may have been involved as with the similar house, Barragunda, at Cape Schanck. Edward La Trobe Bateman (1815?-1897) was involved in the designs of Barragunda, principally the gardens. Bateman's grand nephew was Charles Latrobe, and emigrated in 1852 as a gold digger. In Victoria, Bateman worked as an illustrator, draughtsman, architectural decorator and landscape designer. He worked with Reed and Barnes who were Melbourne's leading architects.

There are also similarities with Kolor at Penshurst in the Western District which Reed and Barnes designed for Joseph Twomey in 1868. The design of Kolor is more coherent which suggests the master's hand. Bateman designed the garden at nearby Chatsworth house in 1867 for John Moffat. All these houses form an important expression of the Picturesque movement in Victoria. They parallel the work of the Geelong architects A. Davidson and G. Henderson and follow the theories of Eugène Viollet-le-Duc.

Cottage

In addition to the main dwelling, located on the site, is a diagonally-fitted drop slab cottage, originally constructed with unsawn timber posts, in c. 1864. The cottage has a triple-curved hipped shingled roof and one large stone chimney. The bay window is post framed, as is the covered way to the main house and the gabled south-west extension. The cottage is a rare surviving example of drop slab construction and the use of slabs laid diagonally is unique in Victoria. Stylistically this first building is a very rare example of the Picturesque cottage orne and has no relationship to contemporary Australian practice. The cottage was restored in 2017.

=== Garden ===
The garden of Heronswood laid out by Bateman is also significant. Initially set on 14 hectares (35 acres), when the property was sold in 1983, the size had reduced, via subdivision, to 1.4 hectares (3.5 acres). The original orchard remains on adjacent land.

Hearn employed William Moat to develop spacious lawns and gardens. Rare oriental and occidental trees were planted, many of which survive to this day. A cape chestnut is one of the most impressive trees today that survived from these early plantings. Moat also developed an orchard and fenced Hearn's property. He planted many pine trees, some of which are still standing.

The garden was listed in the Oxford Companion to Gardens as one of only four entries for the state of Victoria, along with the Melbourne Botanical Gardens, Mawallock and Ripponlea. The Oxford Companion is an encyclopedia of the art of garden design from the earliest known gardens to contemporary times. In 2020, the garden at Heronswood was listed as one of the world’s best gardens in the book, The Gardener’s Garden.

== See also ==
- Architecture of Melbourne
- List of places on the Victorian Heritage Register in the Shire of Mornington Peninsula
