= Pulpit Rock (Cape Schanck) =

Rock in Cape Schanck, Victoria, Australia

Coordinates: 38.5001°S 144.8893°E

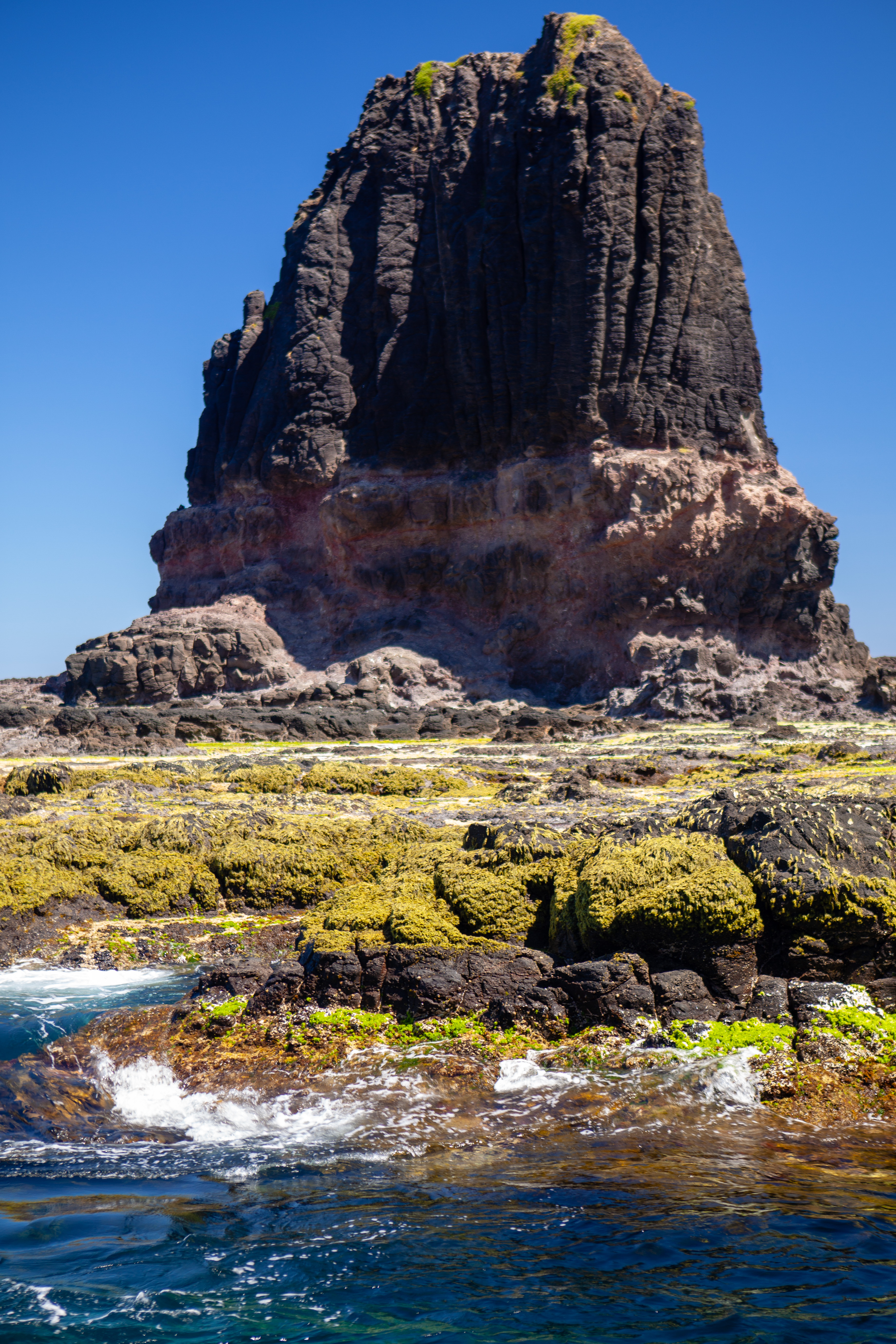
Pulpit Rock

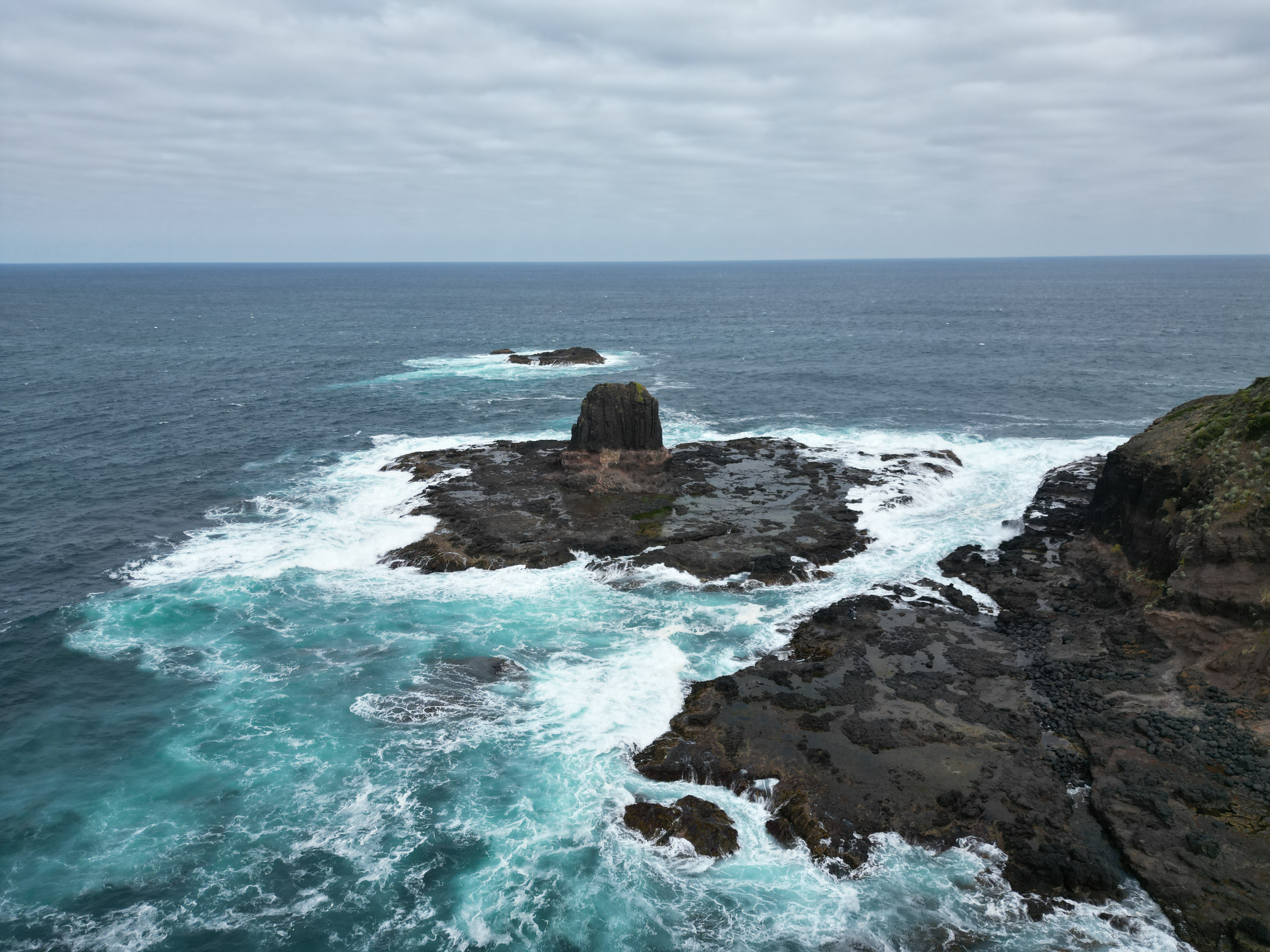
Pulpit Rock at Cape Schanck. April 2024.

Pulpit Rock is a rock located in Cape Schanck, Victoria, Australia. It is in the Mornington Peninsula National Park, near the Bass Strait.

Pulpit Rock is a geological formation created by volcanic activity over millions of years. Its base is called Devils Desk (see image below).

A painting of the rock by Nicholas Chevalier (1828–1902) is held in the Art Gallery of New South Wales.

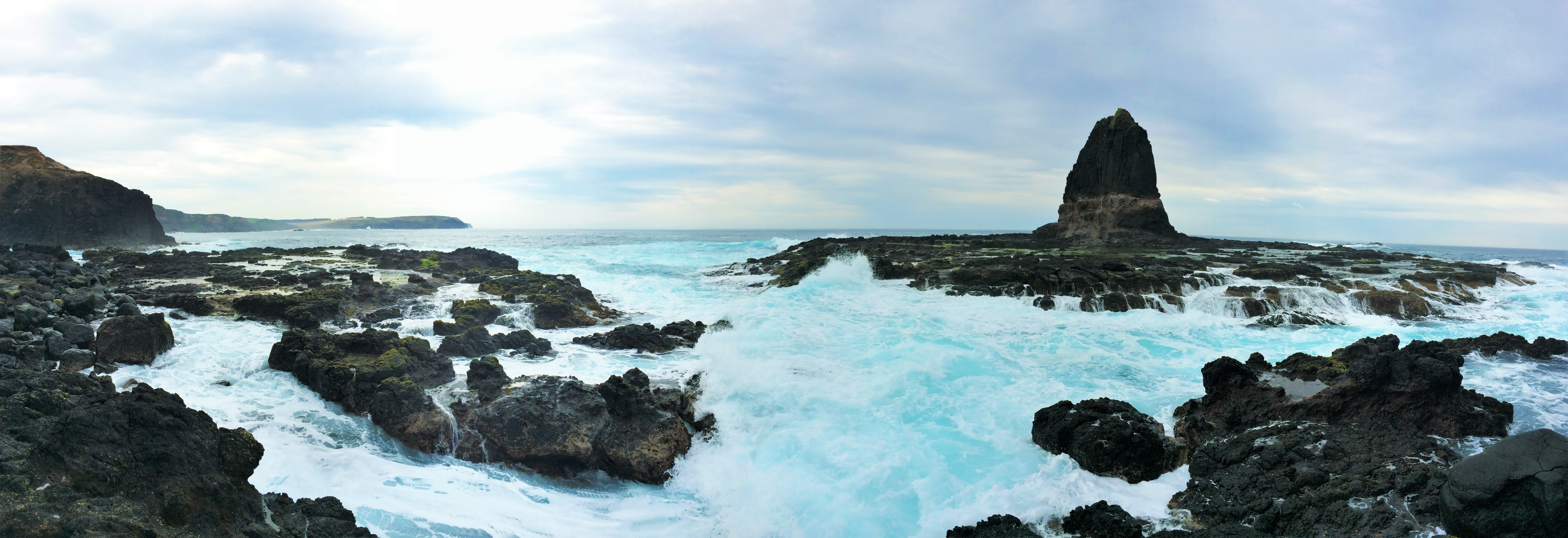
Pulpit Rock - looking as scary as ever. Taken on 10th of October, 2015. Photo details: 4.15mm ƒ/2.2 1/1001s ISO 50

== Erosion ==
Pulpit Rock was eroded constantly by large waves and heavy winds over millions of years, thus its unique appearance.
