= Mornington Peninsula National Park =

National park in Australia

- IUCN category II (national park)
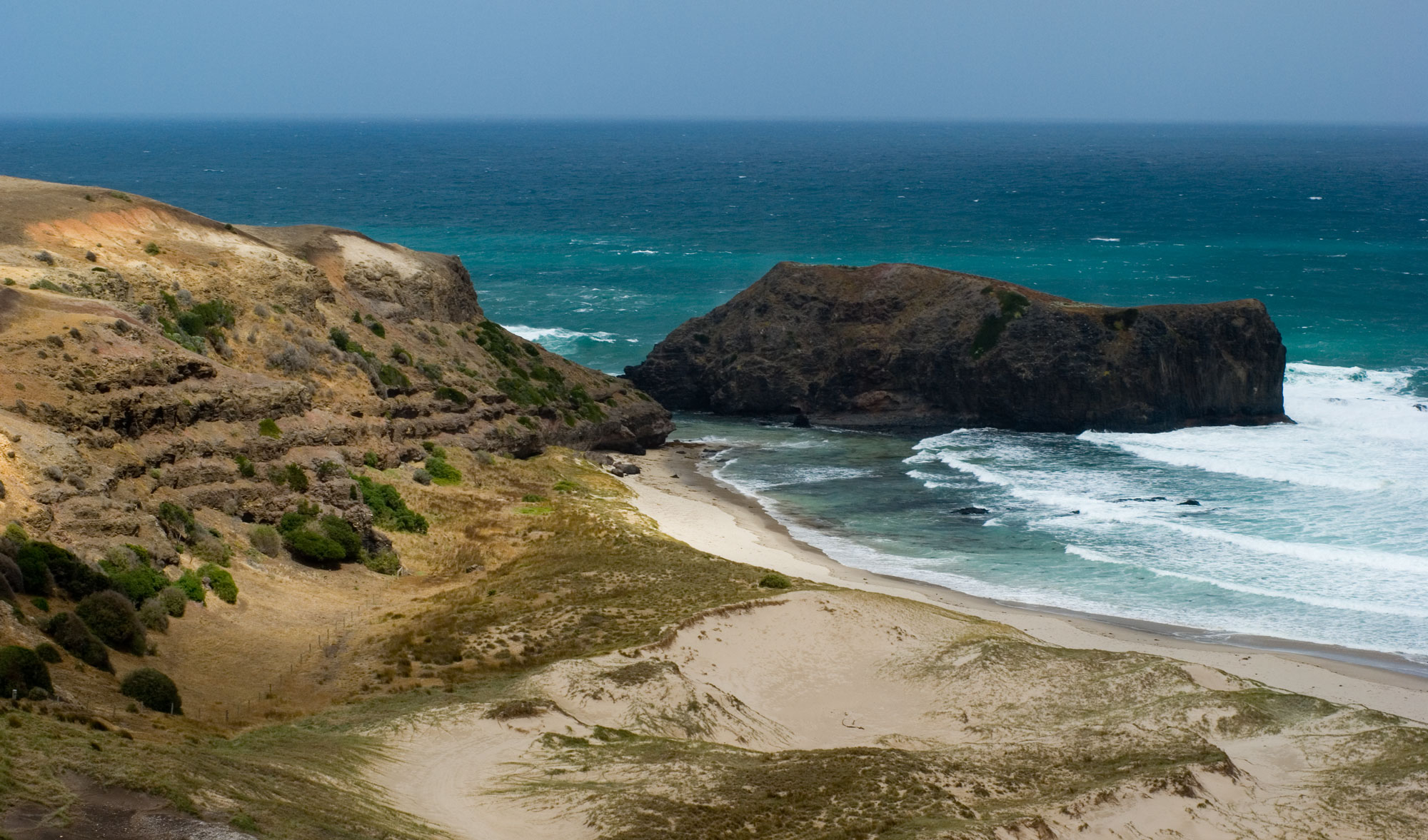
- Elephant Rock, one of the park's landmarks.

- Location within Victoria
- Location: Victoria
- Nearest city: Melbourne
- Coordinates: 38°30′08″S 144°53′18″E
- Area: 26.86 km^{2} (10.37 sq mi)
- Established: 1 December 1975 (as Cape Schanck Coastal Park); 1988 (as Point Nepean NP); 1995 (as Mornington Peninsula NP)
- Governing body: Parks Victoria
- Website: Official website

The Mornington Peninsula National Park is a national park located in the Greater Melbourne region of Victoria, Australia. The 2,686-hectare (6,640-acre) national park is situated approximately 90 kilometres (56 mi) south of Melbourne on the Mornington Peninsula.

Together with the adjacent Arthurs Seat State Park, the national park was listed on the now-defunct Register of the National Estate, in recognition of their outstanding values and their importance as part of the protected area's heritage.

== Features ==
The Coast Walk, a two-day 30-kilometre (19 mi) walking track from Cape Schanck to London Bridge takes in almost the entire coastline of the national park. The walk features a network of cliff top tracks with spectacular ocean views and dense coastal vegetation, as well as sections of long beach walks which pass by sculpted sand dunes and tidal rock pools. The Farnsworth Track links Portsea Surf Beach with London Bridge and is 2 kilometres (1.2 mi) in length. The Coppins Track is a 3-kilometre (1.9 mi) return walking track from Sorrento Ocean Beach to Diamond Bay. The Cape Schanck Lighthouse and associated buildings were constructed from 1859 and are excellent example of the architecture of the day.

Situated between Arthurs Seat and Cape Schanck on the Mornington Peninsula, Greens Bush is the largest remnant of bushland on the Peninsula. Surrounded by farmland, the area contains a variety of vegetation communities, making it a wildlife haven and excellent place for nature walking.

Horse riding is a popular activity in parts of the national park, with access from the national park entrance station near Gunnamatta and also near St Andrews Beach. Dog walking is also permitted in certain parts of beachland within the park, within certain hours; with dogs required to be kept on a leash.

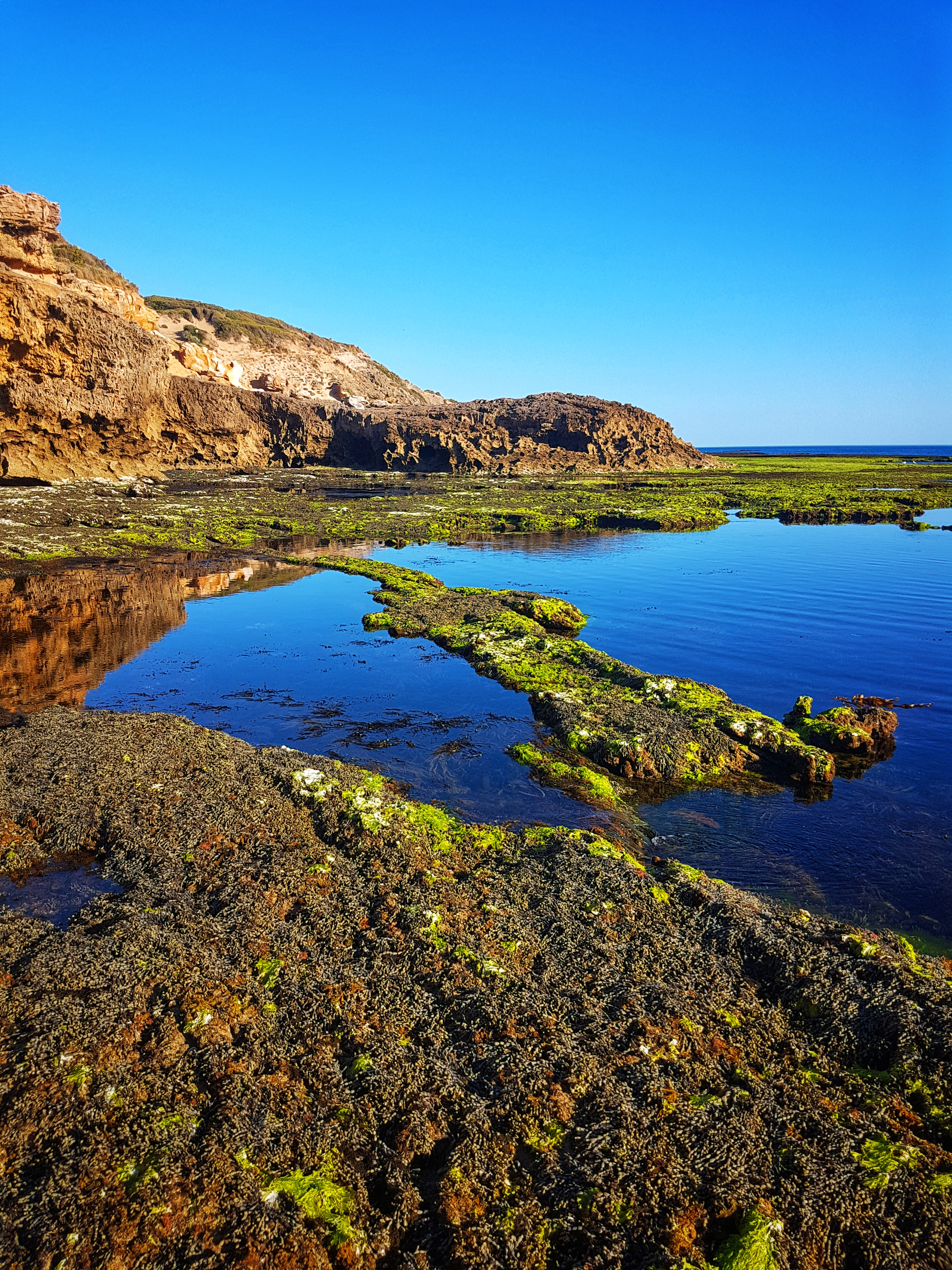
Rock pools and reflections at Sorrento, Mornington Peninsula National Park

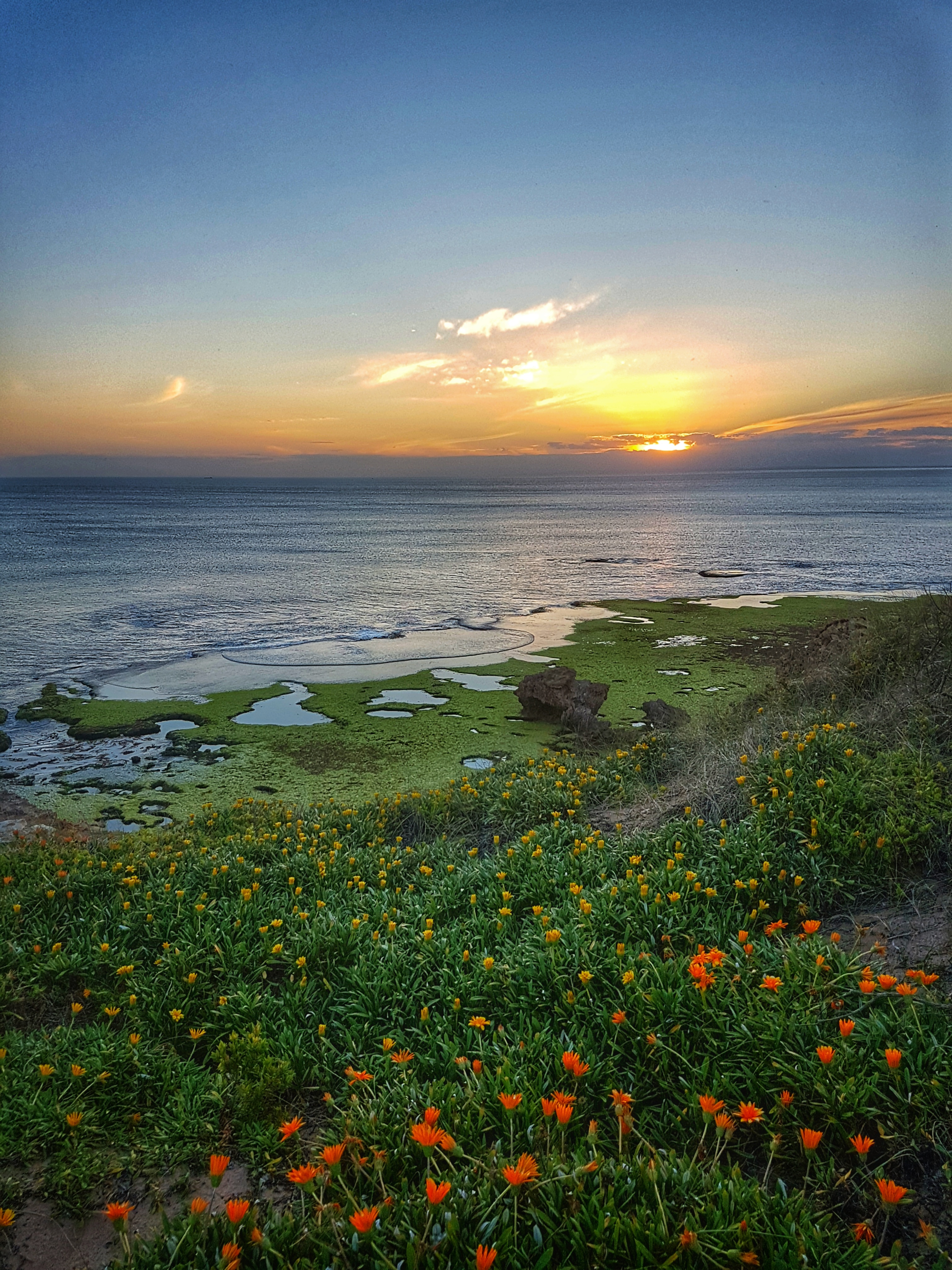
Sunset over rock pools and wildflowers in Sorrento, Mornington Peninsula National Park

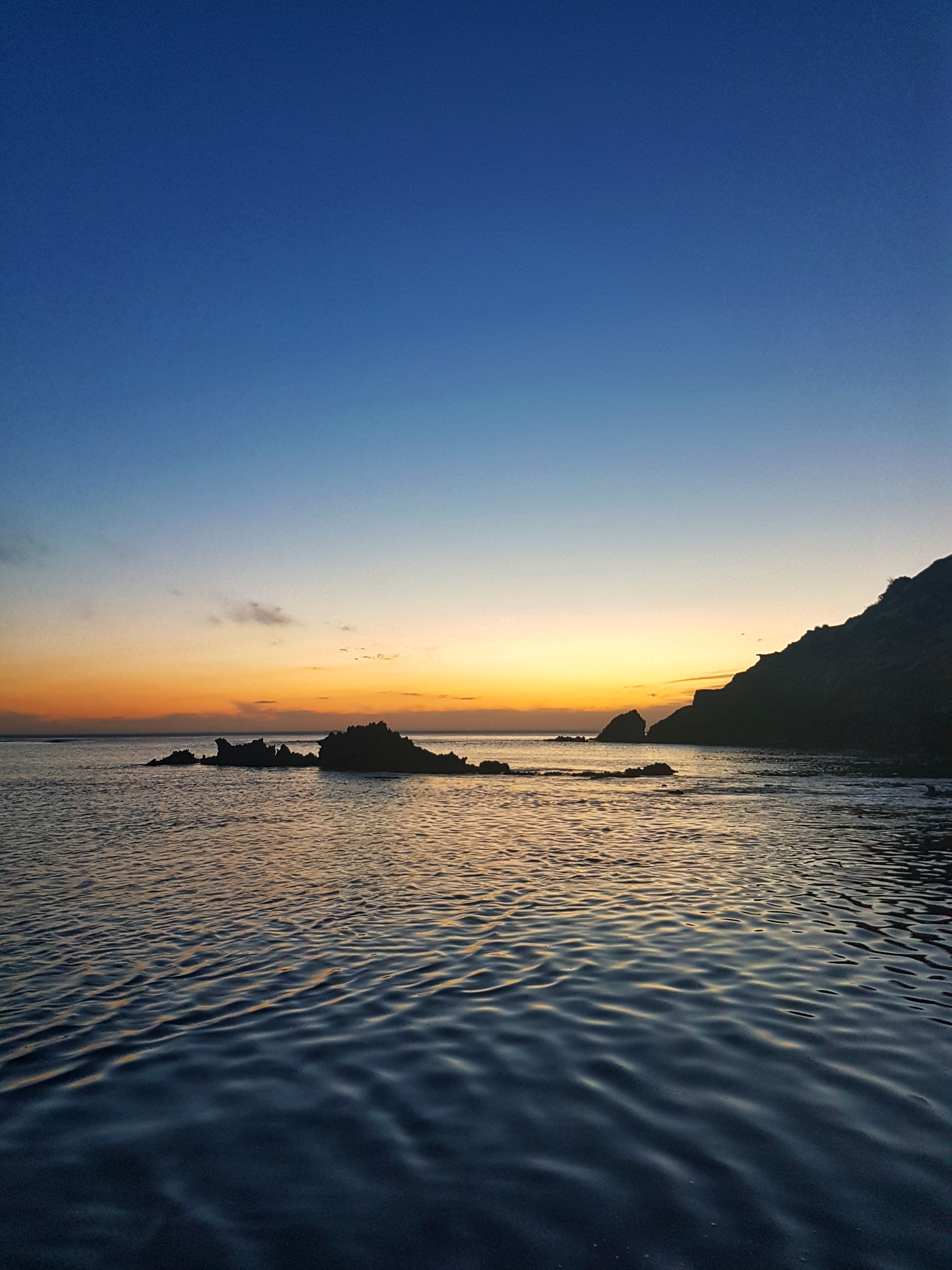
Smooth waves and soothing sunsets at, Sorrento, Mornington Peninsula National Park

== See also ==
- Protected areas of Victoria
- Mornington Peninsula and Western Port Biosphere Reserve
- List of national parks of Australia
