= Barragunda =

Heritage-listed house in Melbourne, Victoria, Australia

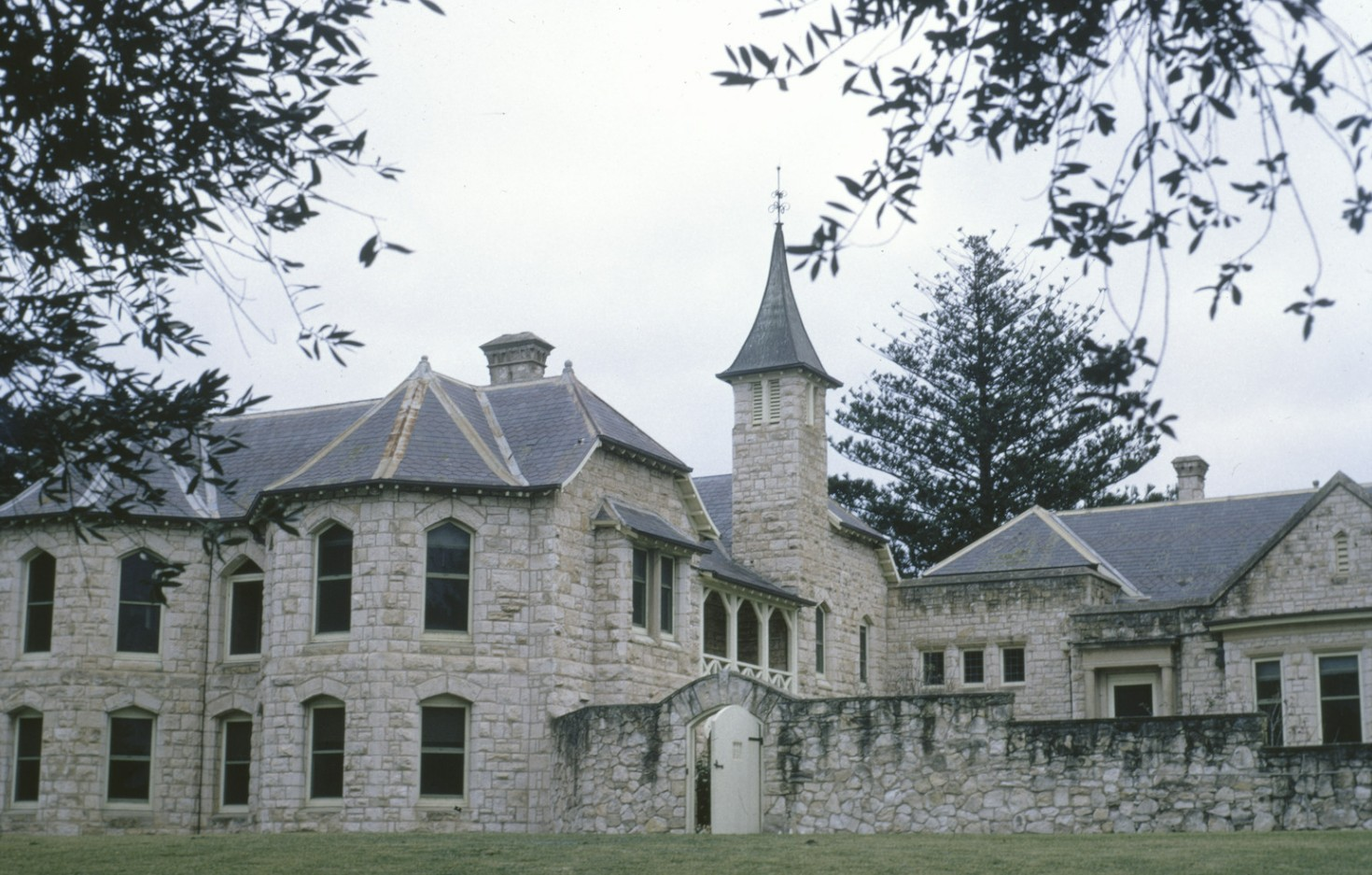
- Barragunda, in 1972

- Location of the homestead in Greater Metropolitan Melbourne

General information
- Status: Completed
- Type: Homestead
- Architectural style: French Gothic (1860s); Georgian Revival (1930s)
- Location: 113 Cape Schanck Road, Cape Schanck, Mornington Peninsula, Melbourne, Victoria, Australia
- Coordinates: 38°28′00″S 144°54′15″E
- Year built: c. 1860 – c. 1866
- Completed: c. 1866; 160 years ago
- Renovated: 1930s
- Client: Dr Godfrey Howitt
- Owner: Godfrey Howitt (1866–1873); Robert and Edith Anderson (1873–1908); Sir Marcus Whiting and John Whiting (1908–1920); John Munckton (1920–1921); Bell family (1921–????); anor; Morris family (since 1999)

Technical details
- Material: Limestone; slate; timber
- Floor count: 2, plus tower
- Grounds: 452 ha (1,120 acres)

Design and construction
- Architecture firm: Joseph Reed and Barnes
- Other designers: Edward La Trobe Bateman

Renovating team
- Architect: Marcus Martin

Victorian Heritage Register
- Official name: Barragunda
- Type: Registered place
- Designated: 19 February 1986
- Reference no.: H0615
- Heritage overlay no.: HO38
- Categories: Parks, Gardens and Trees; Residential buildings (private)

Register of the National Estate
- Official name: Barragunda
- Type: Defunct register
- Designated: 21 March 1978
- Reference no.: 5803

Barragunda is a homestead located at 113 Cape Schanck Road in Cape Schanck, on the Mornington Peninsula, in south-eastern suburbs of Melbourne, in Victoria, Australia.

Located on the traditional lands of the Bunurong people, the homestead was built between c. 1860 – c. 1866 and was added to the Victorian Heritage Register on 19 February 1986; and was also added to non-statutory lists by the Victorian branch of the National Trust on 8 June 1972 and the now defunct Register of the National Estate on 21 March 1978.

== Description ==
The first European settler in the area was John Barker, a pastoralist, from the 1840s. Barker's original homestead is thought to survive nearby, although altered and extended. Barker later subdivided the pastoral run and was sold to J.B. Were CMG and Dr Godfrey Howitt. Were subsequently sold to Howitt, who built Barragunda in the mid-1860s, (Note: The Victorian Heritage Database states that the owner was William Howitt, Godfrey's brother. However, William was only in Victoria between 1852 and c. 1854. The (defunct) Register of the National Estate and a heritage study for the Shire of Mornington Peninsula both stated that Godfrey Howitt built Barragunda during the 1860s.) as a wedding gift to his daughter, Edith, and her husband, Robert Anderson.

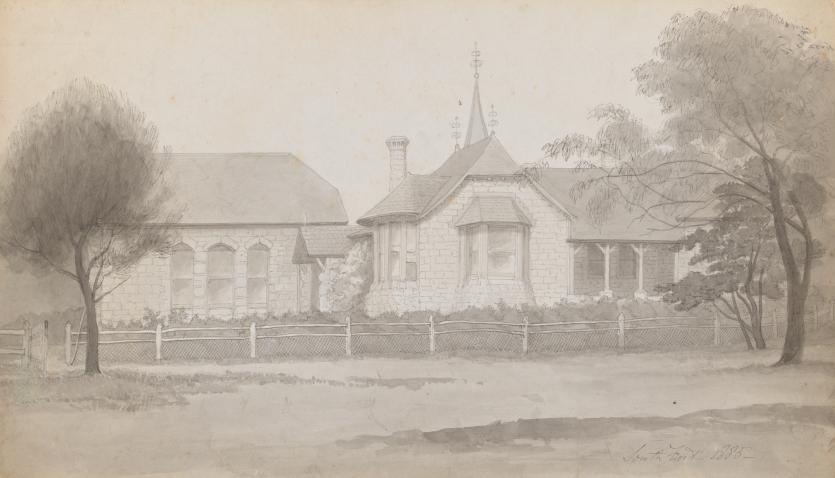
Painting of Barragunda by Georgiana McCrae, c. 1880s

The design of the house was variously attributed to Edward La Trobe Bateman and Joseph Reed and Barnes. Bateman was a very talented English designer who was connected by birth to Benjamin Latrobe. He was also associated with the Pre-Raphaelite Brotherhood and influential artists and designers in London including Rosette and Owen Jones. Bateman came to Australia to search for gold, following Howitt. It is most likely that Joseph Reed and Barnes, architects, supervised Bateman's designs of the garden; Bateman also designed the garden at Chatsworth, in the Western Districts and designed the house and garden of Heronswood at Dromana. The style of the house, a romantic interpretation of French Gothic, is most unusual and Heronswood is its only parallel. Some of the work of Davidson and Henderson, architects based in Geelong, shows similar references. Otherwise the French Gothic influence is limited to ecclesiastic and scholastic architecture. Georgiana McCrae, an acquaintance of Bateman, attributes only the decoration of Barragunda to him in her reminiscences.

The house is built of locally-quarried limestone, with a slate roof, and tower. The planning internally is conventional. Some internal details survive, however, no original decoration. The house was extended in the 1930s by Marcus Martin. The additions are sympathetic but are in the Georgian Revival style which Martin used at this time. Many internal fittings were reused from a mansion demolished in Toorak. The house remains substantially unchanged from that time.

The homestead was surrounded by a simple open park, although a walled garden enclosed the house on two sides. The homestead was set in a rolling landscape, with views across Cape Schanck and the Bushrangers Bay.

== Subsequent owners ==
Howitt died in 1873; and his daughter, Edith Anderson, who was bequeathed right of residency whilst living, until her death, in 1884. Robert Anderson remarried in 1887 and added an extensive north wing to the property in an unsympathetic style that were subsequently removed. In 1908, Anderson retired to Melbourne where he died in September 1923. At that time, the land holding was 2,800 hectares (7,000 acres). The purchaser was Sir Marcus Whiting and his brother, John, a merchant. The following year the Whiting brothers sold approximately 400 hectares (1,000 acres). John Whiting died in 1913, and over the next decade the run was subdivided into five parts and four of them were sold. The portion containing the house and 288 hectares (711 acres) was sold to John Munckton, a tar distiller, in 1920.

Munckton sold the following year to George Turnbull Bell, described as a ‘gentleman’. Bell proclaimed the property as a sanctuary for native game in 1929; however, he died two years later, and the property passed to his children, Dr James Riddell Bell, Constance Fyfe Bell, and Margaret Scott Bell. Dr James Bell bought out his sisters' interests in 1939 and Barragunda became his family's permanent home. He demolished Anderson's crude additions from the late 1880s.

=== Contemporary use ===
The property has changed hands several times since the 1930s, and some of the land that formed the original run has been re-acquired. This includes some of the blocks in the small village subdivision in the lighthouse precinct. The most recent sale was recorded in November 1999 when 452 hectares (1,120 acres) was purchased by the Morris family for A$6.1 million. In 2025, the 1930's part of the homestead was repurposed as a contemporary restaurant with capacity for forty diners. The main heritage-listed part of the homestead is a private residence.

== See also ==
- Architecture of Melbourne
- List of places on the Victorian Heritage Register in the Shire of Mornington Peninsula
