= St Erth (disambiguation) =

St Erth can refer to:

- Saint Erc, an early Irish saint in Cornwall
- St Erth, a parish and village in Cornwall, United Kingdom.
- St Erth gardens, Blackwood, Victoria, Australia
- St Erth railway station, a railway station near the village of St Erth.
