= The Digger's Club =

Australian gardening club

The Diggers Club is Australia's largest gardening club, with over 85,000 members.

They were established in 1978 to provide diverse seeds and plants which were claimed to be disappearing from circulation and promoted heirloom fruit and vegetable revival in the 1990s.

It was originally a commercial business established by Penny and Clive Blazey to provide gardeners with all their gardening needs. Over the years, the club claims to have extended its conservation efforts with extensive seed and plant preservation programs. In 2011 The Diggers Foundation - a registered not-for-profit charity.

== Gardens ==
=== Heronswood ===
Located on the Mornington Peninsula, Heronswood is the home of The Diggers Foundation.

Heronswood is listed on the Register of the National Estate. It is also listed in Oxford Companion to Gardens as one of only four gardens in Victoria, alongside the Melbourne Botanical Gardens, Mawallock and Rippon Lea.

The first law professor at Melbourne University, William Hearn, employed Edward Latrobe Bateman to design Heronswood's main house in 1866. The house, which is of an asymmetric Gothic Revival design, was completed in 1871.

=== The Garden of St Erth ===
In 1854 Matthew Rogers, a Cornish stonemason, left Sydney in pursuit of gold discovered near Mount Blackwood in Victoria. In the 1860s he built a sandstone cottage, naming it "St Erth" after his birthplace in Cornwall now restored and forming the centrepiece of the gardens.

During the Gold Rush, the site was a town of 13,000 people and feverish activity. Now, 160 years later, you can visit the last remaining stone cottage.

=== Cloudehill ===
Cloudehill has been made by Jeremy Francis from one of the ‘home’ properties of the famous Woolrich family Rangeview nursery & flower farm. In 1895, George Woolrich was granted a ‘Village Settlement’ ten-acre block which he cleared and planted to cherries and raspberries. In 1919 his sons, Jim and Ted, took over the property and commenced work on their Rangeview project. Rangeview was to be the first of many ornamental plant nurseries in the Dandenongs in those years and operated through to the late 1960s.
