= La Trobe's Cottage =

Building in Melbourne, Victoria, Australia

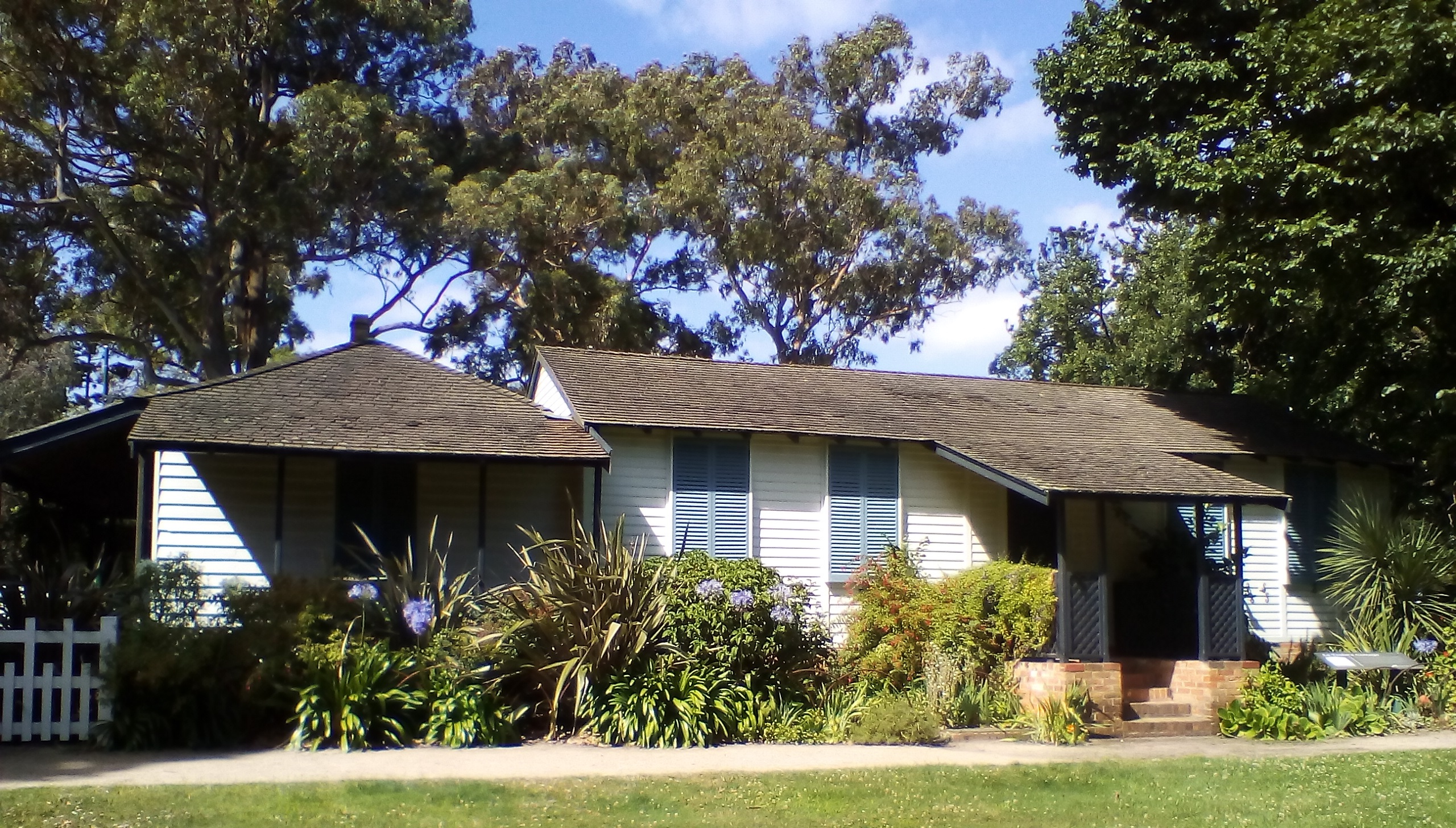
- La Trobe's Cottage in Kings Domain, Melbourne

- Location within Melbourne
- Etymology: Charles La Trobe

General information
- Status: Completed
- Architectural style: Pre-separation colonial Georgian
- Location: Melbourne, Victoria, Australia
- Coordinates: 37°49′54″S 144°58′34″E
- Current tenants: National Trust of Australia (Victoria)
- Completed: 1839; 187 years ago

Victorian Heritage Register
- Official name: La Trobe's Cottage
- Type: State heritage (built)
- Designated: 13 April 1995
- Reference no.: 4729
- Type: Residential buildings; museum
- Category: Registered place
- Builders: Manning of London; and others

La Trobe's Cottage is a historic cottage in Melbourne, Victoria, Australia, built in 1839 by the first superintendent of the Port Phillip District of New South Wales, Charles La Trobe, and his family.

== Construction and significance ==
The cottage was constructed out of prefabricated materials imported from England on 50,000 square metres (540,000 sq ft) of land at Jolimont, near where the Melbourne Cricket Ground now stands. When the colony achieved independence from New South Wales in 1851 La Trobe was made the first Lieutenant-Governor of Victoria and, although land had been reserved in Kings Domain as the site for a future Government House, he remained living with his family in this cottage at Jolimont until his departure for England in 1854.

The cottage is listed on the Victorian Heritage Register for its historical, social and architectural significance. It is one of the few surviving examples still standing of prefabricated houses from this period of history and gives an insight into early colonial domestic architecture and living arrangements. Personal effects of La Trobe and his family are still contained in the cottage. The dining room added by La Trobe is believed to be the oldest surviving structure built in Melbourne. The architectural style is described as Pre-separation colonial Georgian.

== Jolimont and the Bedggoods ==
John Sharp, in a letter to the editor of The Argus of May 1888, refers to 'Governor La Trobe's cottage residence in Jolimont' which had been removed 'several years ago'. Sharp said he had two photographs of the building, one of which he sent to the Australasian Sketcher with Pen and Pencil 'in the hope that some day it may be useful'. In June of that year, the Australasian Sketcher with Pen and Pencil published an illustration based on Sharp's photograph and noted that he was a former owner of the cottage which 'still stands'. They published another illustration based on a photograph provided by its then owner H. W. Patton and repeated Sharps' contention that the cottage had also been the home of Charles Perry, the first Anglican bishop of Melbourne, and Hugh Childers, a Chancellor of the Exchequer in the United Kingdom. In November of that year the Australian Sketcher wrote that 'Governor Latrobe's cottage' was owned by 'Messers. Alfred Fenton and Sons' while 'the quaint old place which Bishop Perry occupied... was some time ago pulled down to make room for the residence of Mr. Sharp'. This different cottage 'at the corner of Wellington-parade and Jolimont-terrace' had also been the home of Childers.

In 1914, the cottage was the property of Messers. Bedggood and Company, who had their boot manufacturing company on an adjoining Jolimont block. It was proposed that the cottage, which was in an 'advanced state of decay', be demolished to extend the Bedggood premises. Daniel Bedggood agreed to a proposal by the 'Early Pioneers Association', who were 'interested in the old edifice as a relic of Australian history', that the intended demolition be delayed 'for a few days' so that 'leading citizens', including the mayor, Premier William Watt and state governor Sir Arthur Stanley, could visit the site. During the visit there were a number of speakers about the cottage and its history and the governor was reported as saying that 'Old landmarks disappeared with the advance of a progressive city' but he hoped 'some kind of mural record should be placed' on the boot factory extension. Daniel Bedggood, 'promised the Government whatever portion of the building that was desired as a relic' and 'stated his intention of erecting a building in his own garden with the remaining material'. A later news report from 1942 stated that the Bedggood family extended the factory but 'the main section of the cottage was preserved in its original state' while 'in more recent times, as a centenary gesture' the company 'had a garden of early 19th century design planted around the cottage' and they 'opened it for public inspection'.

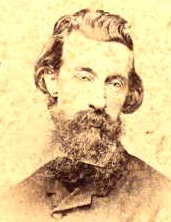
Edward La Trobe Bateman's early sketches of the cottage were donated to the state by Charles La Trobe's grandchildren.

Pencil sketches of the cottage and its grounds from the era when the La Trobe family were in residence were donated by Charles La Trobe's grandchildren to the state of Victoria in 1924. The sketches were the work of Edward Bateman, Charles La Trobe's cousin. Later that year The Argus newspaper reproduced one of Bateman's sketches adding that 'until recently the remains' of the cottage 'were still standing at the rear of the factory of Bedggood and Co. Pty. Ltd., in Agnes Street'. Two watercolours 'dated 1842 or 1844' depictions of the cottage were also donated by another La Trobe grandchild in 1934.

Thunderstorms were reported to have damaged the cottage in 1935 which was 'already weakened by senile decay in its ninety-fifth year'. Rain had 'severely damaged the ceiling of the old banqueting hall' and two sheets of iron were blown off the roof. Contractors had concerns 'another heavy storm might send the tall brick chimney crashing down'. H.L. Bedggood of owners Bedggood and Co. said that 'the damaged ceiling would be repaired immediately' while the 'rusted' roof 'would be painted with a covering of red oxide' which 'would not enhance the appearance of the building but would help to preserve it'.

A photograph and article from The Argus' 'Week-end Magazine' in 1941 stating that the cottage had been removed from the site and rebuilt at Mt. Evelyn received reader replies, including one from a representative of the Historical Society of Victoria, that the removed building had belonged to a Thomas Elder Boyd, not La Trobe. A further reader reply, from a correspondent of Charles La Trobe's daughter Eleanor, wrote that when 'Bedggood bought Governor La Trobe's house he wrote me and told me he had framed a letter he received from Miss La Trobe and attached it to the cottage'.

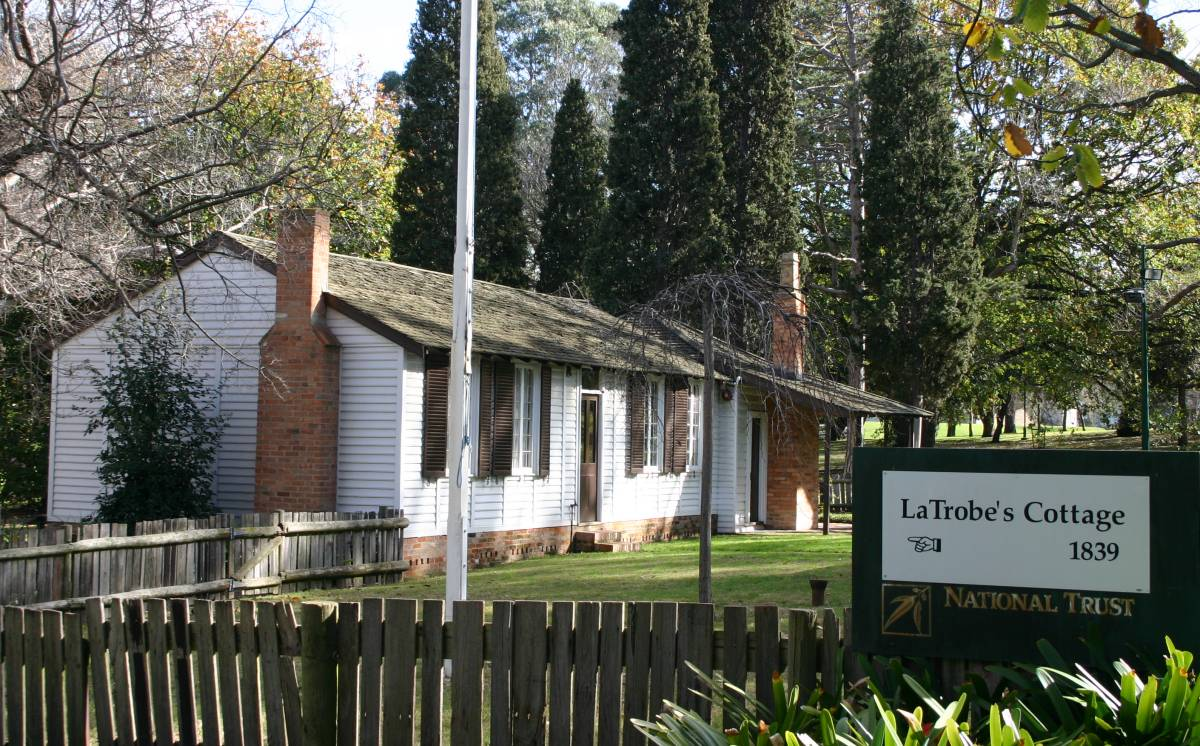
La Trobe's Cottage (back side)

In March, 1942 it was reported that the cottage was to be demolished to make way for an air raid shelter that would accommodate 350 people. The following month 'a portion of the cottage' was 'taken down'. Mr. H.L. Bedggood said that the family would demolish the cottage 'with regret' to build the air shelter for its factory workers but it was a choice between destroying the 'old building' or the more recently added 19th century garden. However, 'if possible' the 'front portion of the cottage' would be retained.

The bricks from the demolition were turned into doorstops by 'Mrs. H. C. Colville, Burke rd, Hawthorn and sold at the 'Red Cross Variety Shop at 82 Collins st, Melbourne'. In making the doorstops 'Mrs Colville covers the sides and back with green felt, and on the front is a small copper plate bearing the inscription "Brick from residence of Victoria's first Governor, 1839."' The doorstops sold for 3 shillings but for an extra shilling the buyer could 'have the brick covered with felt to match the room where it will be used'. The Red Cross had other bricks from the cottage for sale which 'would be most suitable for use as garden paving squares or surrounds' and, for 10 shillings and sixpence, landscape gardener Edna Walling would 'plan designs and supervise construction'. Also available for sale were 'other interesting relics from the cottage' including '5 windows with wood and metal frames', 3 doors, '10 panel wall sections' and 'one pair of cedar shutters'.

Before the 1956 Summer Olympics, which were held in Melbourne, a letter to the editor remarked on the 'sorry condition' of the cottage with its roof 'thick with rust, the walls dingy with grime, the garden untidy' and expressed the hope it would be 'tidied up before the Games'. In reply, the following day, Horace Bedggood was quoted as saying:

'We have left the building there as an antique for people to see and naturally it looks like an antique... Architects tell us it would fall down if we interfered with it too much.'

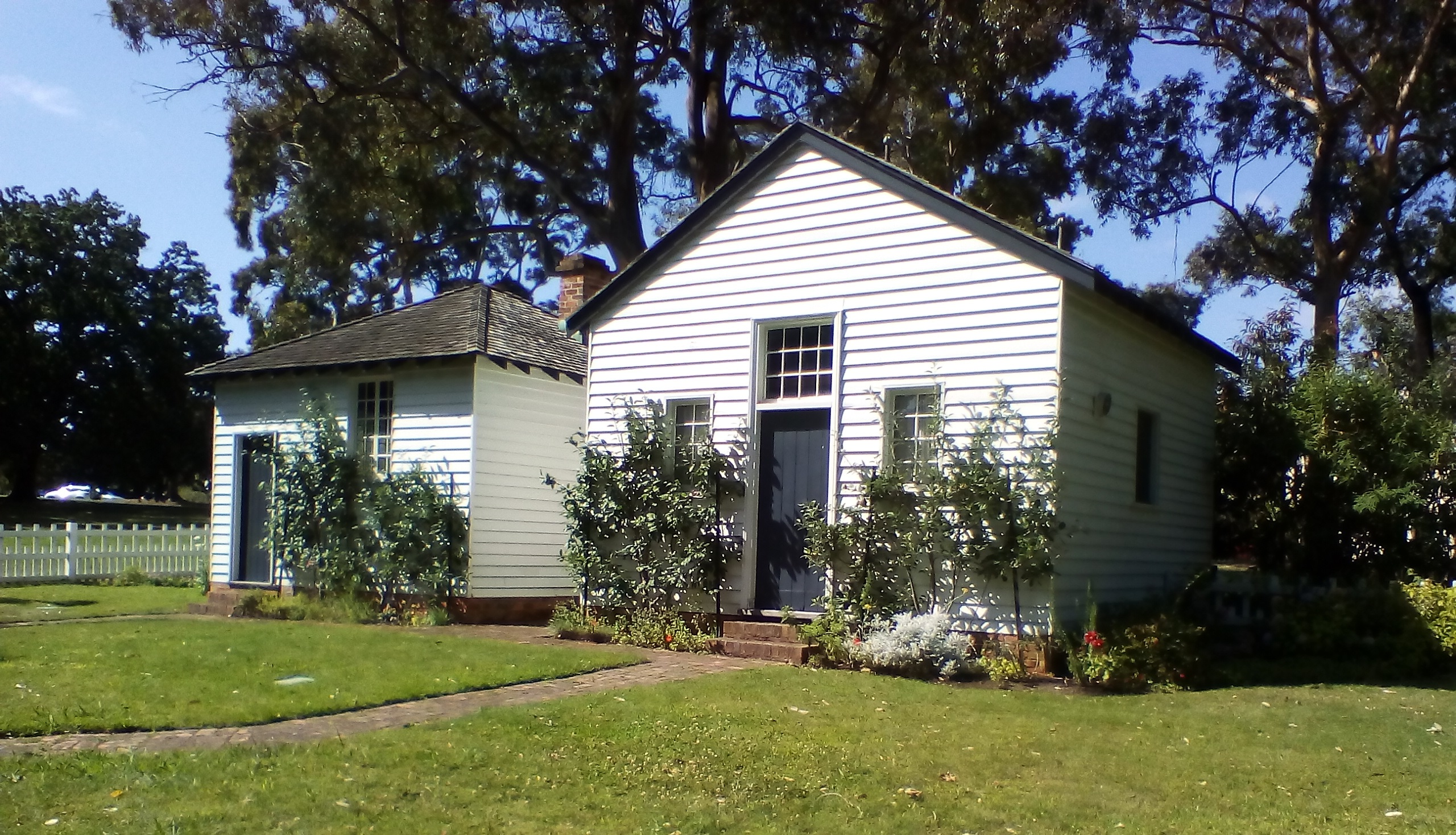
Kitchen and servants quarters

== Relocation ==
In December 1963, the rebuilt cottage was officially opened at its new location in Kings Domain, as an historical landmark. It was later moved again, a short distance, and is now located backing on to Dallas Brooks Drive. It represents an early example of conservation of an endangered heritage building, utilising early techniques of heritage preservation but the cottage is 'largely a reconstruction' and it 'contains within it a small portion of authentic fabric, including one wall of the building originally prefabricated by Manning of London'. It is now operated as a museum by the National Trust of Australia, and is regularly open to the public.

In January 2026, the cottage was vandalised with red paint and graffiti resulting in an estimated $8,000 in damages.

== See also ==
- Charles La Trobe
