= SS Alert =

Shipwreck in Victoria, Australia

Coordinates: 38°31′34.23″S 144°52′29.35″E

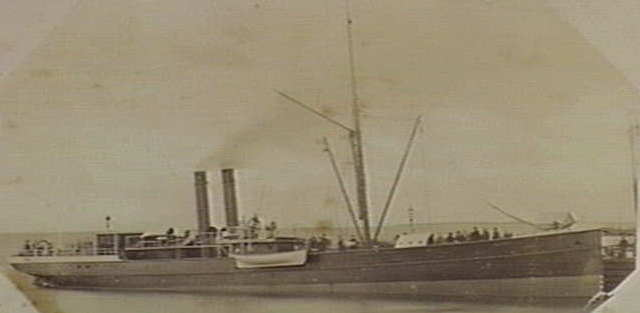
- SS Alert

History

Australia
- Name: Alert
- Owner: Huddart Parker
- Port of registry: Melbourne, Australia
- Builder: Robert Duncan & Co., Port Glasgow
- Launched: 1877
- Identification: Official number: 76169
- Fate: Sunk, 28 December 1893

General characteristics
- Type: Steamship
- Tonnage: 243 tons
- Length: 169 ft (52 m)
- Beam: 19 ft 6 in (5.94 m)
- Depth: 9 ft 10 in (3.00 m)
- Propulsion: Rankin & Blackmore compound steam engine, 90 nhp, 1 screw

SS Alert was a steamship that sank off Cape Schanck, Victoria, Australia on 28 December 1893. The ship was built for the gentle waters of Scottish lochs and was almost 51 m (167 ft) long and weighed 247 tonnes.

After Alert sank the ship laid for 113 years on the ocean floor until being rediscovered in June 2007 by a team from Southern Ocean Exploration.

== History ==
Alert was built at Port Glasgow in 1877 and later sailed to Australia as a three-masted schooner with her funnel and propeller stowed in the hold. After a few years on the Melbourne–Geelong route she temporarily replaced the SS Despatch on the Gippsland–Melbourne run in 1893 whilst Despatch was being refitted.

During a gale, the ship set out from Lakes Entrance bound for Melbourne via Port Albert. She encountered hurricane-force southerly winds and mountainous seas and sank about four miles off Cape Schanck. Of the 16 people on board, the only survivor was Robert Ponting, the ship's cook, who was washed ashore at Sorrento "back" (ocean) beach after clinging to a portion of cabin door. He was found and revived by locals using brandy and the body heat of a St. Bernard dog. Two bodies were also washed ashore at Sorrento back beach.

An inquiry was held and attached no blame to the lighthouse keeper or the captain but, after years of litigation, compensation was awarded to Ponting and the wife of one of the deceased.
