= Cape Schanck Lighthouse =

Lighthouse in Victoria, Australia

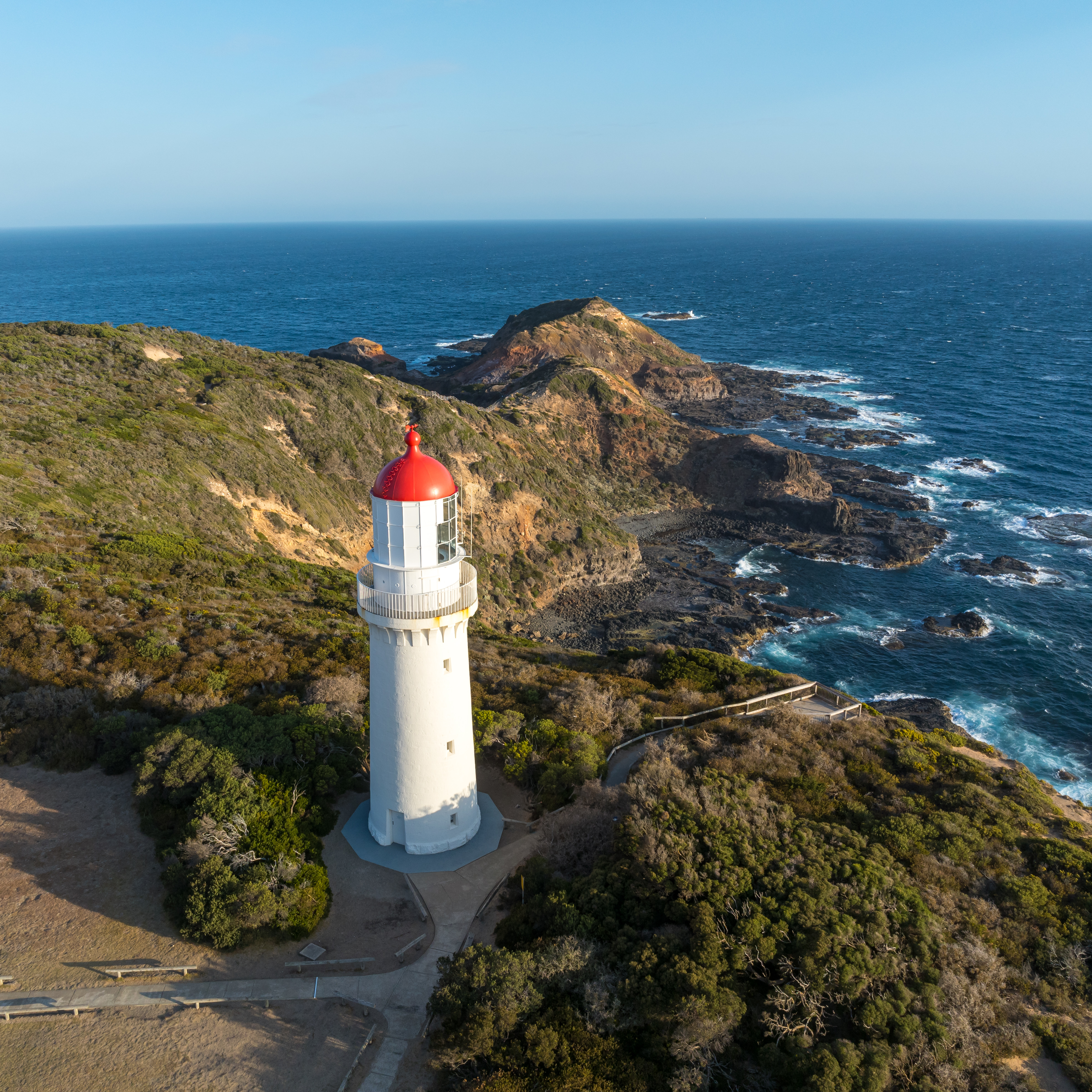
- Aerial view of the lighthouse, 2025
- Location: Cape Schanck, Mornington Peninsula, Victoria
- Coordinates: 38°29′34″S 144°53′11″E

Tower
- Construction: Limestone tower
- Automated: 1987
- Height: 21 m (69 ft)
- Shape: Conical tower with balcony and lantern
- Markings: White tower, red lantern dome
- Power source: mains electricity
- Operator: Australian Maritime Safety Authority
- Heritage: Victorian Heritage Register

Light
- First lit: 1859; 167 years ago
- Focal height: 100 m (330 ft) AHD
- Light source: 1st order Fresnel by Chance Brothers
- Intensity: 1,000,000 cd
- Range: 26 nmi (48 km)
- Characteristic: Mo (N)

History
- Built by: Public Works Department

Site notes
- Material: Limestone; red bricks; cast iron
- Architect: Charles Maplestone
- Website: capeschancklighthouse

Victorian Heritage Register
- Official name: Cape Schanck Lightstation
- Type: Registered place
- Designated: 12 November 1998
- Reference no.: H1748
- Heritage overlay no.: HO39
- Category: Transport - Water

Register of the National Estate
- Official name: Cape Schanck Lighthouse Group
- Type: Defunct register
- Designated: 21 October 1980
- Reference no.: 5796

The Cape Schanck Lighthouse is an active lighthouse and associated museum, located at Cape Schanck, at the southernmost tip of the Mornington Peninsula, in Victoria, Australia. Built in 1859 as the second coastal lighthouse in Victoria, the 21-metre-tall (69 ft) tower was built from limestone.

The light's focal plane is situated 100 metres (330 ft) above sea level, the light characteristic is the Morse code letter "N", a long signal of 10.8 seconds followed by a flash. Depending on the bearing of the light, the colours are either white (south to west sector) or red (east sector). Due to its powerful lantern of one million candela and a first order Fresnel lens, which was installed in 1915, the light has a range of 26 nautical miles (48 km).

Operated by the Australian Maritime Safety Authority, the lighthouse is the first lighthouse tower with stone stairs built in Australia.

The lighthouse was added to the Victorian Heritage Register on 12 November 1998 in recognition of its historical, architectural, scientific, social and archaeological importance; and was also added to non-statutory lists by the Victorian branch of the National Trust on 23 November 1978 and the now defunct Register of the National Estate on 21 October 1980.

== History ==
A coastal light at Cape Schanck was authorised in the second campaign of Victorian highway or ocean — as opposed to harbour — lighthouse construction during the 1850s, alongside the lights at Wilsons Promontory and Gabo Island. The program was a response to repeated shipwrecks in Bass Strait and was financed through intercolonial cooperation between the Australian colonies, an arrangement that has been described as a precursor to Federation.

Initially administered by the Victorian Government, Cape Schanck, along with other Victorian ocean lighthouses, was handed over to the Australian Government after Federation. All the transferred lighthouses, now automated, were returned to Victoria in 1995.

== Description ==
The Cape Schanck Lighthouse forms one corner of a triangle of Bass Strait lights together with Cape Otway to the west and Cape Wickham on King Island to the south, marking the western approaches to Port Phillip.

The 21-metre-tall (69 ft) tower was constructed of locally quarried limestone and incorporated a stone stairway in place of the wrought iron stair more usual for Australian lights of the period. The lighthouse buildings at Cape Schanck were designed within the Public Works Department, most likely by Charles Maplestone. Maplestone, who had arrived in Victoria in 1853, produced a closely related series of limestone keepers' residences at Cape Schanck, Wilsons Promontory, and Gabo Island, with similar quarters added later at Cape Otway. Like Cape Otway there was also a stone signal station; however, this has been demolished leaving only archaeological remains. Other demolished buildings include the stables and stone privies. Unusual features of the Cape Schanck lighthouse are the dispersed layout of the buildings around a central lawn and the retention within the tower of an early clockwork mechanism (despite conversion to automatic operation) and the original 1859 Chance Brothers Fresnel lens, manufactured in Birmingham, and was the first of its type imported to Victoria.

As well as the early buildings there is a red brick 1938 residence and some later utility buildings. One half of the early duplex assistants' quarters has been converted to a museum while the other has been converted to a generator room. A separate weatherboard kitchen block was built in 1887 for these tiny dwellings and was converted to a guest residence in the 1960s.

The lighthouse and museum are open daily for visitors, from 10:00 to 16:00, with extended summer hours. Bookings during peak seasons are encouraged.

== Gallery ==
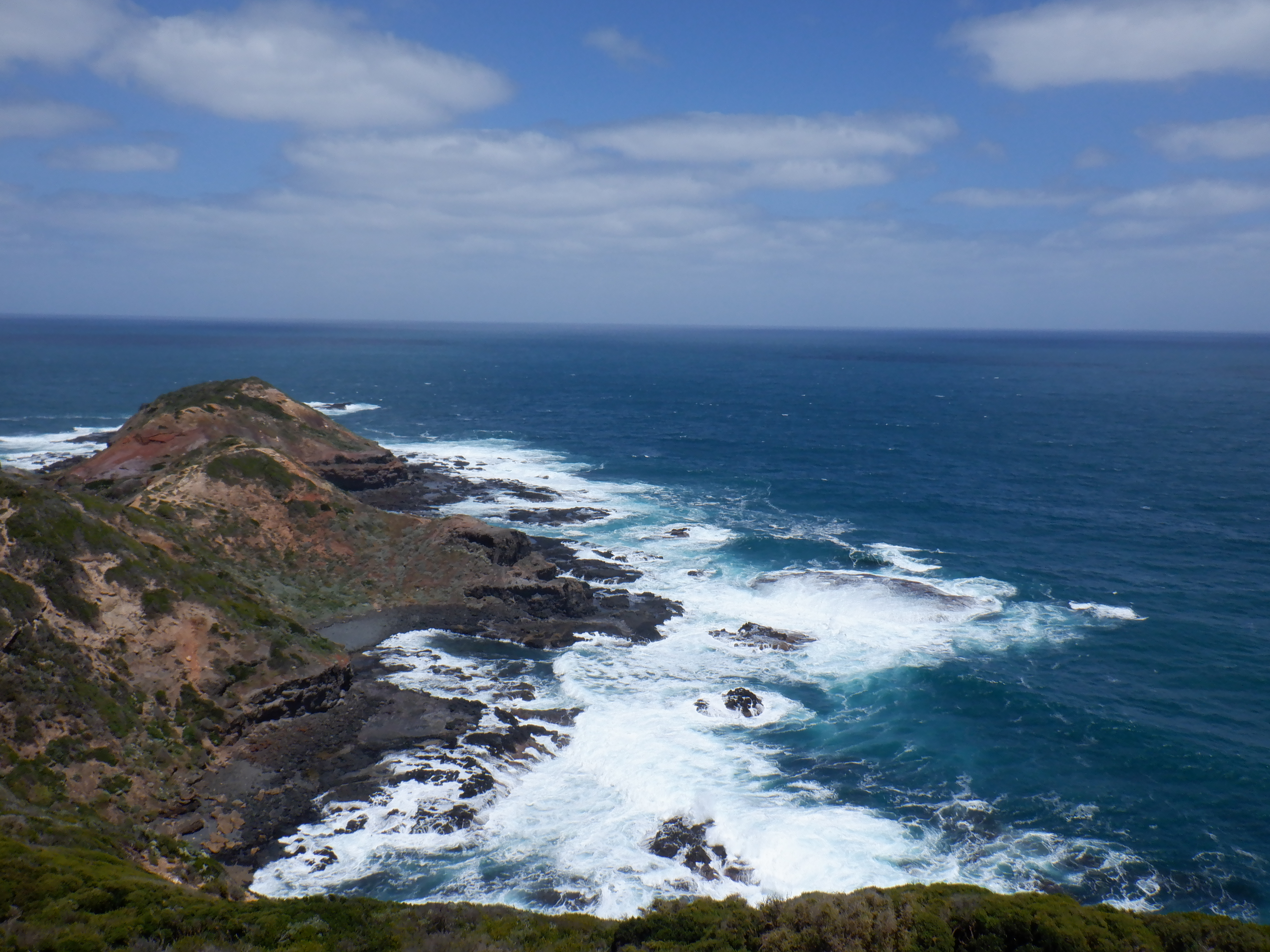
View from the lighthouse

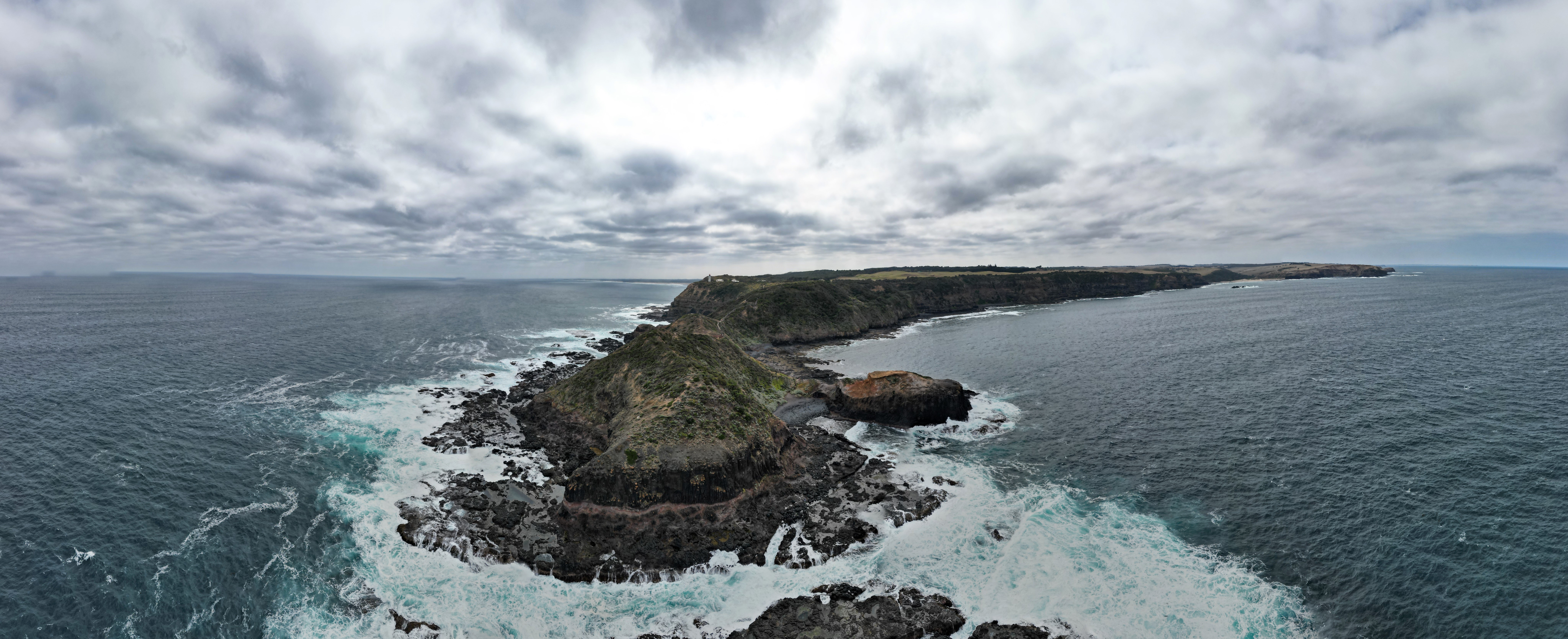
An aerial panorama, 2024

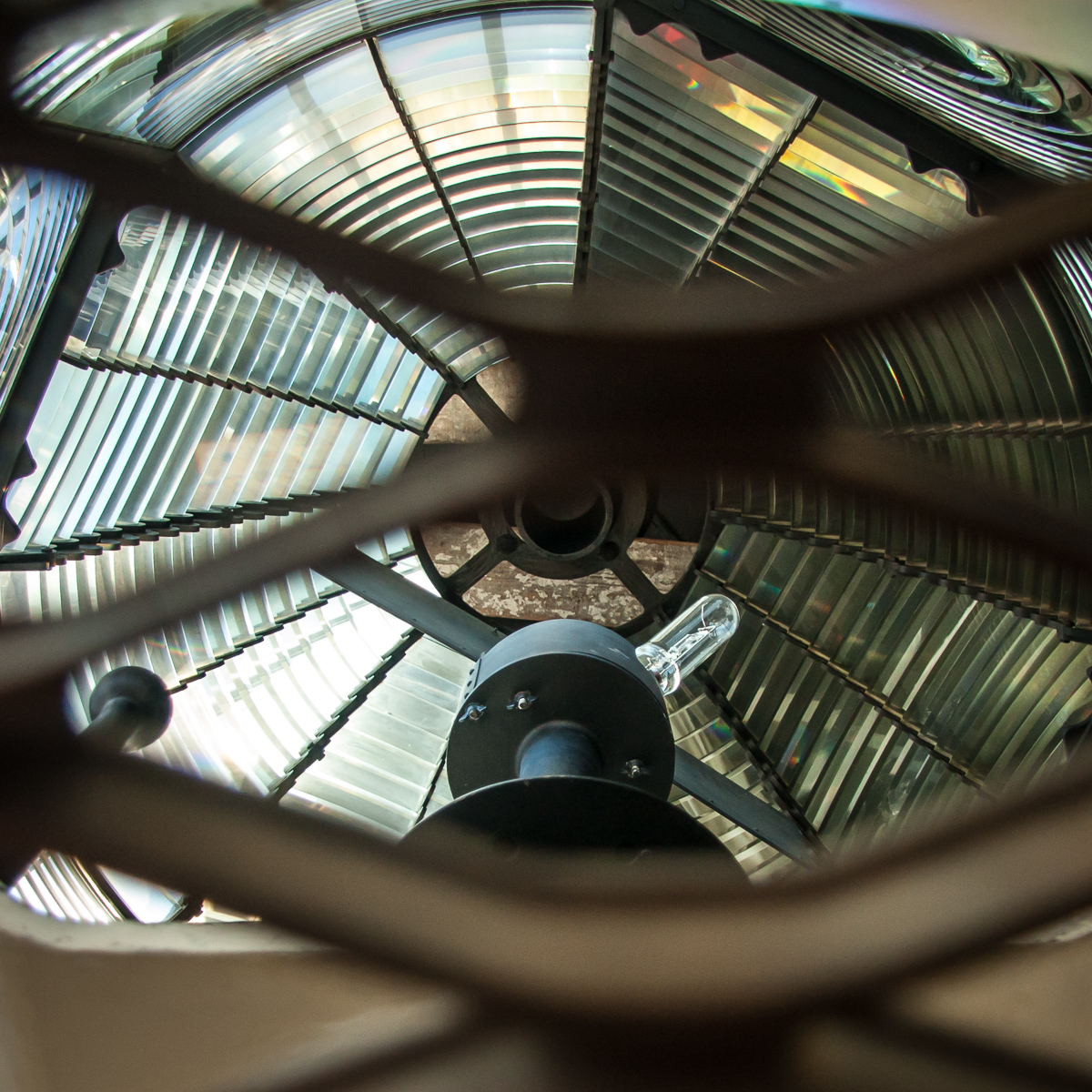
Inside the lens, 2016

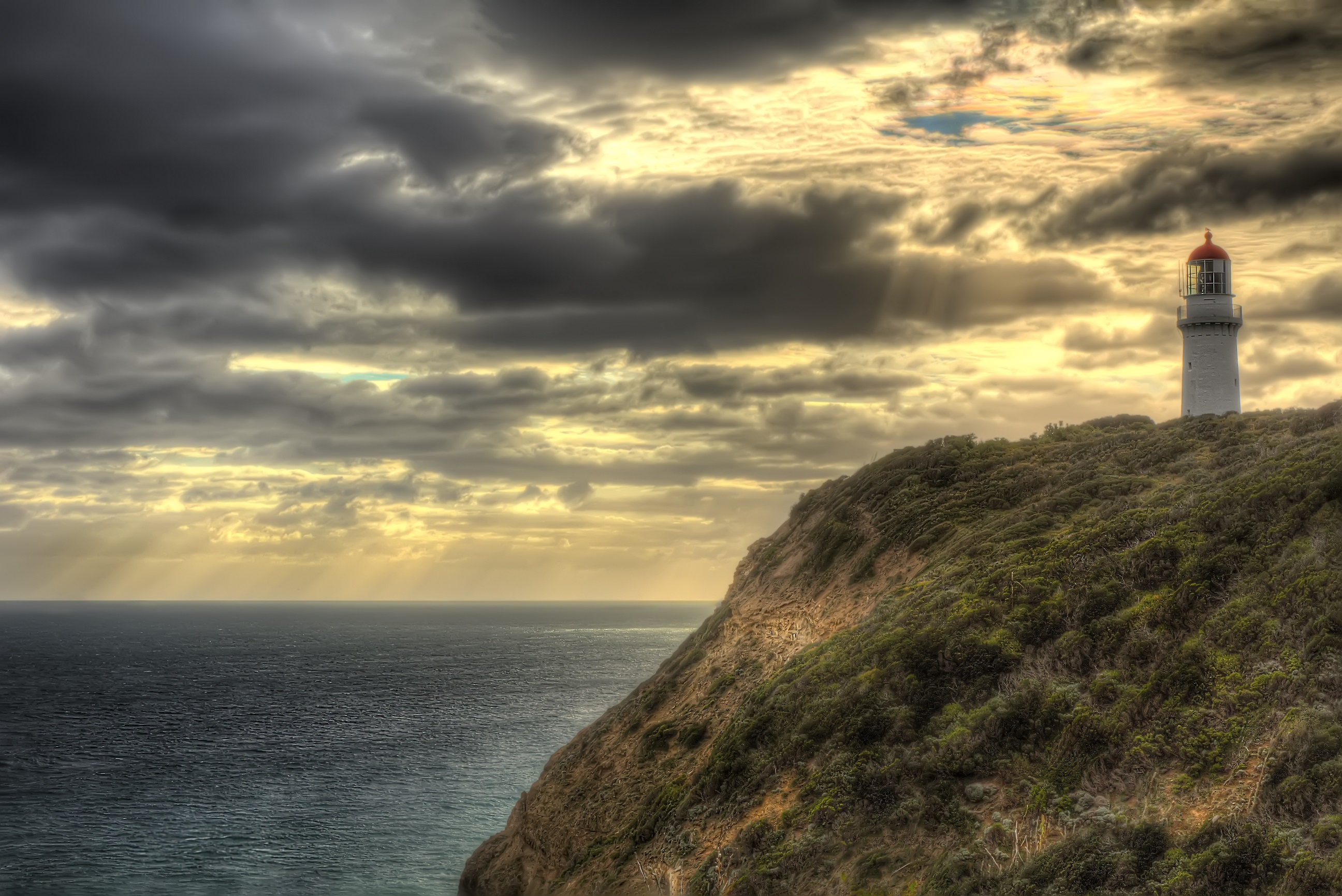
Steep basalt cliff below the lighthouse

== See also ==
- List of lighthouses in Australia
- List of places on the Victorian Heritage Register in the Shire of Mornington Peninsula
