= Godfrey Howitt =

British entomologist (1800–1873)

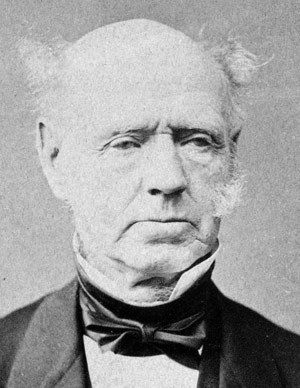
- Born: 8 October 1800; Heanor, Derbyshire, England
- Died: 4 December 1873 (aged 73); Caulfield, Victoria, Australia
- Education: Edinburgh University
- Occupations: Doctor; entomologist; amateur botanist
- Board member of: Melbourne Benevolent Asylum; University of Melbourne Medical School; Philosophical Society of Victoria; Philosophical Institute of Victoria; Royal Society of Victoria
- Spouse: Phoebe Bakewell (m. 1831)
- Children: 4; (3 m, 1 f)
- Parents: Thomas Howitt (father); Phoebe Tantum (mother)
- Relatives: William Howitt (brother)

Godfrey Howitt (8 October 1800 – 4 December 1873) was an English and colonial Australian entomologist.

== Background ==
Howitt was born in Heanor in Derbyshire to Thomas Howitt and Phoebe Tantum, both Quakers. They farmed a few acres of land at Heanor and together acquired a considerable fortune. Godfrey Howitt was educated at Mansfield and tutored by his brother, William, before graduating from Edinburgh University Medical School with an MD in 1830. He married Phoebe Bakewell on 6 April 1831, at the Friends' Meeting House in Castle Donington.

Howitt practised medicine in Leicester and in Nottingham was honorary physician at both the City Infirmary and the General Hospital. In 1833, he issued the exsiccata Muscologia Nottinghamiensis; or, a collection of mosses found chiefly in the neighbourhood of Nottingham: arranged in fasciculi, with descriptions and occasional remarks, with William Valentine as co-editor.

== Life in Australia ==
In 1839, he migrated to improve the health of his eldest child, John Henry. Howitt and his family, a nephew and his wife's brothers, arriving at Port Phillip on the Lord Goderich in April 1840. Howitt erected a prefabricated wooden house he had brought with him and shortly after arriving began work at the Melbourne Hospital.

In 1842 Godfrey and his wife lost their youngest son, Charles, whose death was recorded in the letter of the eldest child, John Henry to his cousin Alfred, still in England at the time. John Henry, whose health had always been precarious, survived his youngest sibling by less than a year and in 1843 he also died.

Howitt continued to work and by 1845 he had extensive lands which covered a number of streets, a large garden, fields near Yea and a farm in Caulfield. Howitt Road in North Caulfield runs through his former lands.

Howitt was made president and honorary physician of the Melbourne Benevolent Asylum in 1847. In June 1852, he was visited by his brother, William, and his sons, Alfred William and Charlton, accompanied by the Pre-Raphaelite Edward La Trobe Bateman. In the October he also played host to two other Pre-Raphaelites, Thomas Woolner and Bernard Smith, before they set out to the gold-rush diggings. Woolner and Smith stayed in Australia for a number of years, eventually returning to England, whilst La Trobe Bateman and Alfred Howitt stayed. Alfred Howitt became a significant figure in the developing colony through his contributions to literature, administration and exploration, whilst La Trobe Bateman applied himself to landscape design; and is attributed with the design of Howitt's summer homestead, Barragunda, on the Mornington Peninsula.

From 1853 to 1871 Godfrey Howitt was a member of the University of Melbourne's council and on the Medical School Committee. He was a founder of the University of Melbourne Medical School in 1858. He was also the first vice-president of the Philosophical Society of Victoria in 1854, Treasurer and Vice President of the Philosophical Institute of Victoria in 1855 and 1856 respectively and a founding member of the Royal Society of Victoria, its successor from 1859 to 1868.

== Botany and entomology ==
Botanist Ferdinand von Mueller named the monotypic genus Howittia, an Australian blue-flowered mallow he had found in Victoria in 1855 after Howitt, "in acknowledgement of his devotion to botany". Howitt helped to found the Entomological Society of London, was a member of the Botanical Society of Edinburgh and in 1839 published The Nottinghamshire Flora.

When he died on 4 December 1873 in Caulfield he was survived by three sons and a daughter. To the University of Melbourne he left one thousand pounds for scholarships, books on botany and his entomological collection.
