= Christian Henry Bateman =

English minister and hymn writer

Christian Henry Bateman (9 August 1813 – 27 July 1889) was an English minister and hymn writer. He is chiefly known as the writer of "Come, Christians Join to Sing", a remix of William Edward Hickson's "Join Now in Praise, and Sing".

Bateman was born in 1813 in Wyke, Yorkshire, the son of John Bateman and Mary Agnes Latrobe. He was baptised into the Moravian Church.

After successfully serving as a congregational minister at the Moravian Church, he was ordained at the Church of England at age 30.

He ministered at the Richmond Place Congregational Church in Edinburgh, Scotland, and successive Congregational parishes in Hopton, Yorkshire, and Reading, Berkshire. At age 56, he took Holy Orders in the Anglican Church and served as a curate and vicar in several Anglican parishes.

He died in 1889 in Carlisle, Cumberland.
