= Pastoralist =

Pastoralist may refer to:

- Pastoralism, raising livestock on natural pastures
- Pastoral farming, settled farmers who grow crops to feed their livestock
- People who keep or raise sheep, sheep farming
