= Alfred Howitt =

Alfred Howitt may refer to:

- Alfred William Howitt (1830–1908), Australian anthropologist and naturalist
- Sir Alfred Howitt (politician) (1879–1954), English Conservative Party politician, member of parliament 1931–1945
