= Cape Schanck =

- Town
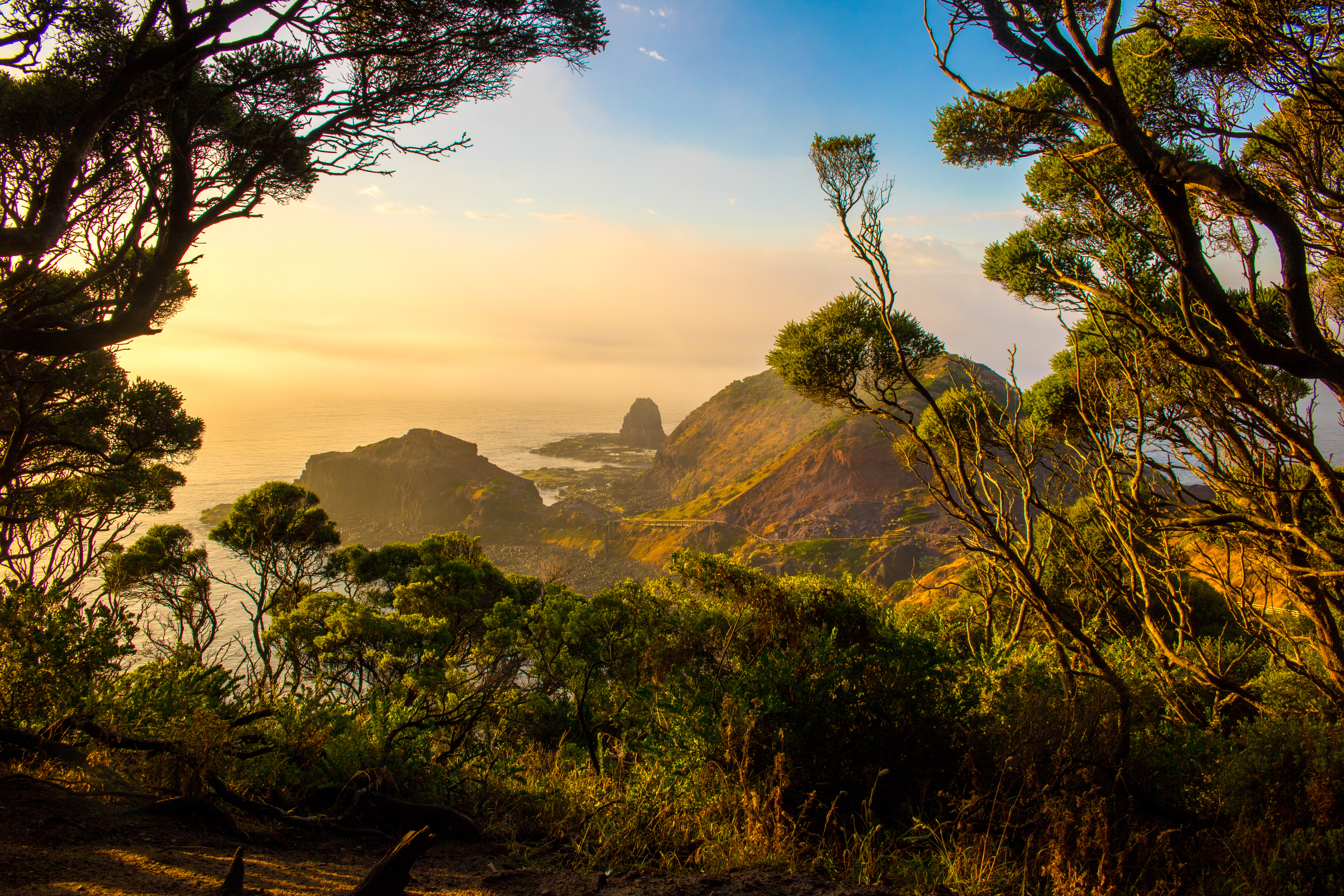
- Cape Schanck looking towards Pulpit Rock at dawn

- Interactive map of Cape Schanck
- Coordinates: 38.461°S 144.905°E
- Country: Australia
- State: Victoria
- LGA: Shire of Mornington Peninsula
- Location: 90 km (56 mi) from Melbourne; 17 km (11 mi) from Rosebud

Government
  - State electorate: Nepean
  - Federal division: Flinders
- Elevation: 79 m (259 ft)

Population
  - Total: 569 (2021 census)
- Postcode: 3939
- Mean max temp: 16.9 °C (62.4 °F)
- Mean min temp: 11 °C (52 °F)
- Annual rainfall: 751.2 mm (29.57 in)

Cape Schanck, or Tunnahan (Boonwurrung) is a locality at the southernmost tip of the Mornington Peninsula in Melbourne, Victoria, Australia, approximately 72 km (45 mi) south of Melbourne's Central Business District, located within the Shire of Mornington Peninsula local government area. Cape Schanck recorded a population of 569 at the 2021 census.

Cape Schanck separates the wild ocean waters of Bass Strait from the slightly calmer waters of Western Port. The most recognisable symbol of Cape Schanck is the Cape Schanck Lighthouse. The lighthouse was built in 1859 and was the second lighthouse built in Victoria. A prominent rock outcrop is Pulpit Rock and stands out at the very tip of the cape.

Cape Schanck is also home to the RACV Resort Cape Schanck on Boneo Road which includes an eighteen-hole golf course and The National Golf Club on Cups Drive.

British-Australian artist Georgiana McCrae produced many of her paintings at Cape Schanck.

A keen artist–traveller in the Romantic tradition, Nicholas Chevalier concentrated on effects of atmosphere, mood and dramatic lighting in his depictions of the iconic natural wonders he found at Cape Schanck.

== History ==
The traditional Boonwurrung name for the cape is Tunnahan.

The location was given its European name in 1800 after Captain John Schank, R.N. (note spelling with only one 'c') by Lieutenant James Grant sailing on the Lady Nelson. Schank had designed the raised keel (or centreboard) on the Lady Nelson. The spelling of the locality as 'Schanck' (two c's) is a misspelling of Schank. Nicolas Baudin called it Cap Richelieu when he sailed past on the Géographe on 30 March 1802.

Cape Schanck Post Office opened around March 1879 and closed in 1962.

In 1893, a steamship, the SS Alert, sank off the coast at Cape Schanck during a storm. It was rediscovered after 113 years on the ocean floor in June 2007.

=== Heritage listings ===
The following places in Cape Schanck are listed on the Victorian Heritage Register:

- Barragunda, 113 Cape Schanck Road
- Cape Schanck Lightstation, Cape Schanck Road

== Flora and fauna ==
Albatrosses (black-browed, Chatham, yellow-nosed, etc.) are occasionally spotted off the cliffs as are short-tailed shearwaters (particularly during their spring migration), black-faced and pied cormorants, kelp gulls and Australasian gannets. The shrubs decorating the area are frequently home to brown thornbills, singing honeyeaters and a number of other passerines. The elusive striated fieldwren has also been known to inhabit the area. Some flora include cushion bushes.

Panorama view of Cape Schanck

== Gallery ==
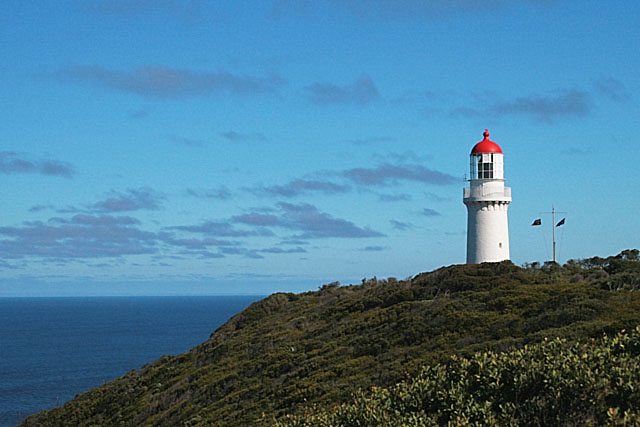
The lighthouse

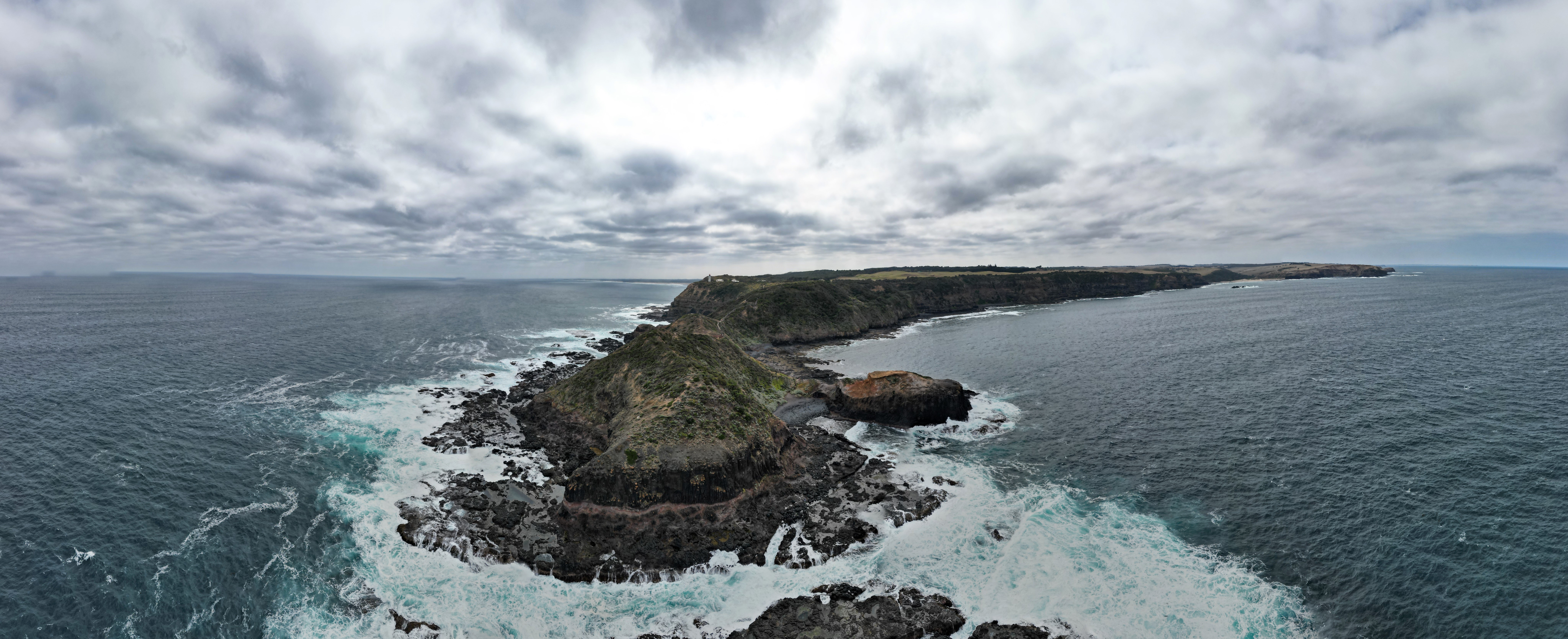
An aerial panorama, 2024

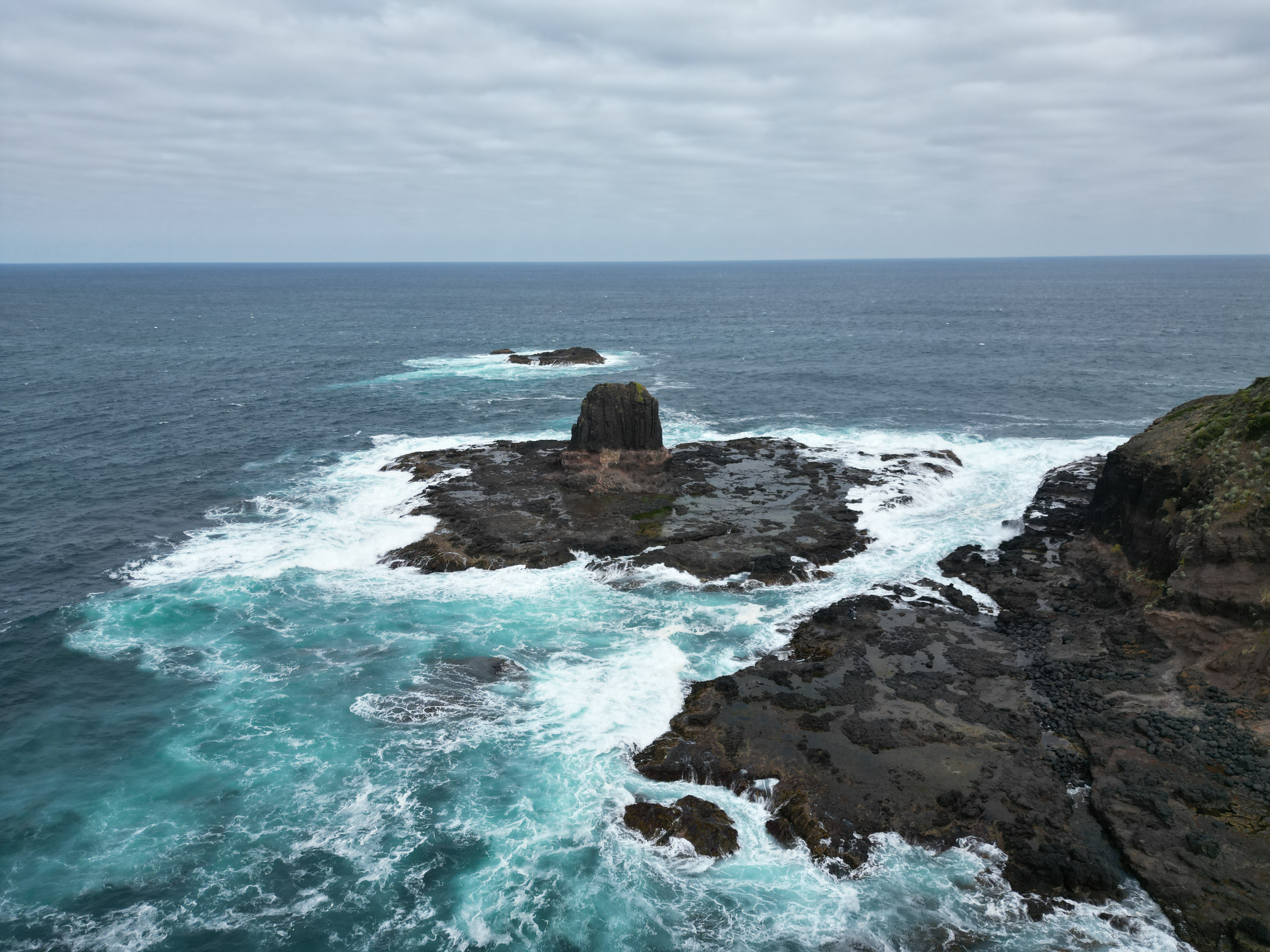
Pulpit Rock, 2024

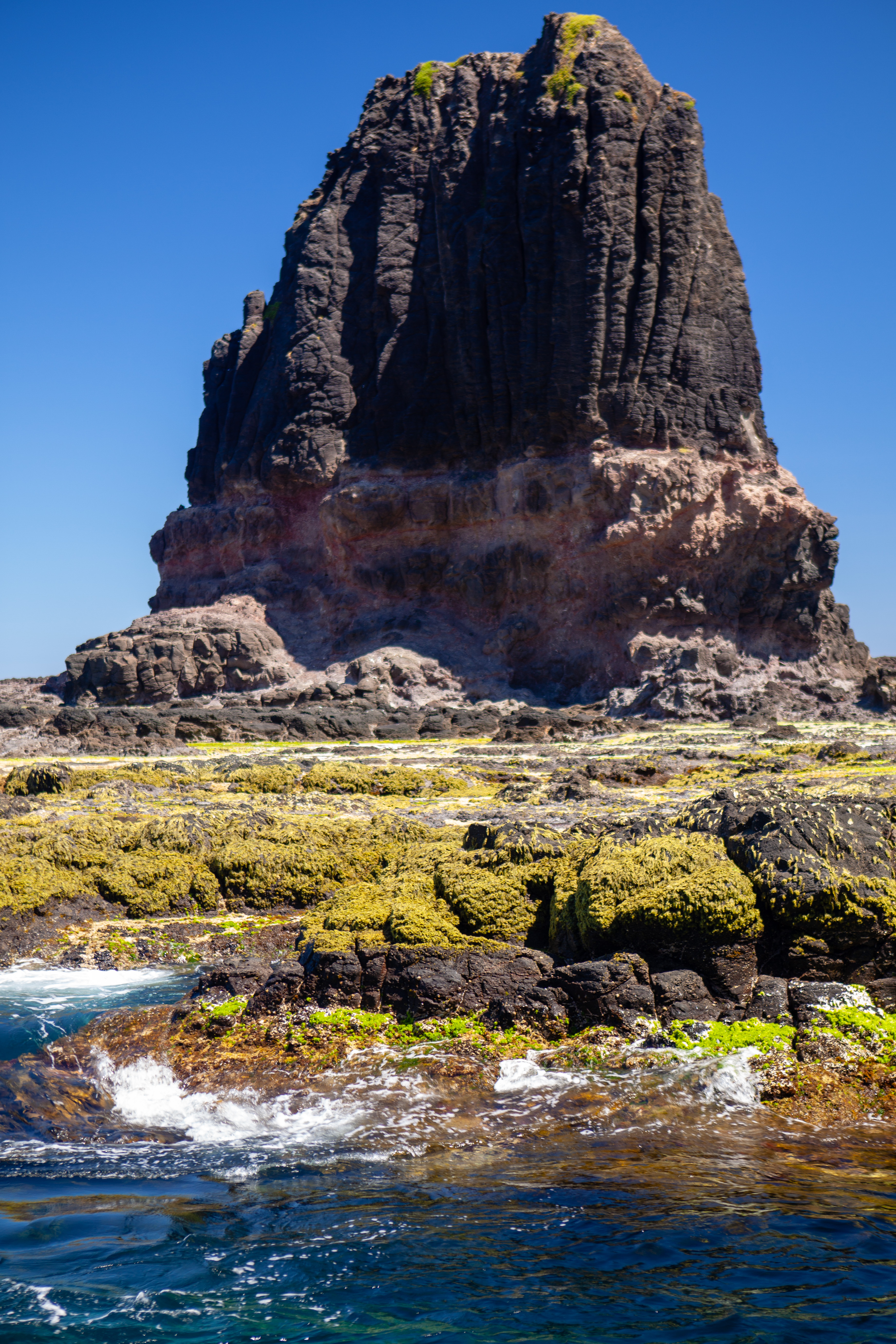
Pulpit Rock

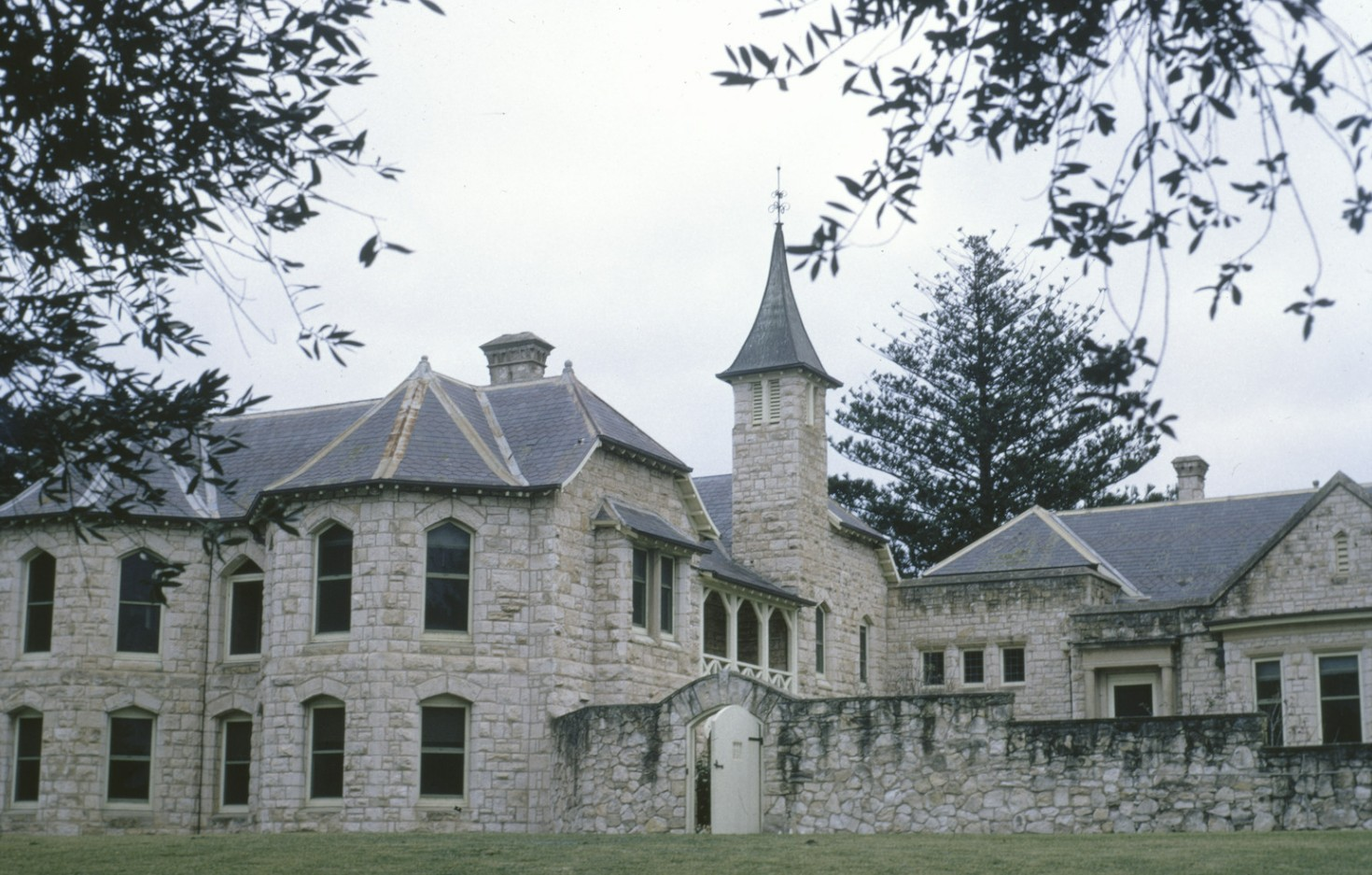
Barragunda, heritage-listed homestead, 1972

== See also ==
- Shire of Flinders – Cape Schanck was previously within this former local government area.
