= Sutherland (surname) =

Sutherland is a Scottish surname which may refer to:

== People ==
- Alexander Sutherland (disambiguation), multiple people
- Andrae Hugh Sutherland (born 1988), Jamaican singer
- Alyssa Sutherland (born 1982), Australian model & actress
- Angus Sutherland (born 1982), American-Canadian actor and producer
- Anne Bryson Sutherland (1922–2011), Scottish plastic surgeon
- Anne Sutherland-Leveson-Gower, Duchess of Sutherland (1829–1888)
- Arthur Sutherland (1867–1953), English shipowner and philanthropist
- Arthur E. Sutherland, Jr. (1902–1973), Harvard Law School professor and legal scholar
- Audrey Sutherland (1921–2015), American traveler, kayaker, teacher, and author
- Bert Sutherland (1936–2020), American IT researcher
- Bruce Sutherland (1926–2010), American pianist, music educator and composer
- Catherine Sutherland (born 1974), Australian actress
- Charles W. Sutherland (1860–1943), American newspaper editor and politician
- Christy Sutherland (born 1976), American singer
- Craig Sutherland (born 1988), Scottish footballer
- Cromartie Sutherland-Leveson-Gower, 4th Duke of Sutherland (1851–1913), British politician
- Daniel Sutherland (1869–1955), American businessperson and politician
- Darren Sutherland (1982–2009), Irish boxer
- David Sutherland (disambiguation), multiple people
- Donald Sutherland (1843/1844–1919), British soldier and explorer of New Zealand
- Donald Sutherland (1935–2024), Canadian actor
- Doug Sutherland (disambiguation), multiple people
- Douglas Sutherland (1919–1995), British author and journalist
- Dwight Sutherland (born 1969), Barbadian politician
- Earl Wilbur Sutherland Jr. (1915–1974), American physiologist and Nobel laureate
- Edmund G. Sutherland (1815–1883), New York politician
- Edwin Sutherland (1883–1950), American sociologist
- Efua Sutherland (1924–1996), Ghanaian playwright
- Eileen Sutherland-Leveson-Gower, Duchess of Sutherland (1891–1943), British courtier
- Esi Sutherland-Addy, Ghanaian academic, writer and human rights activist
- Esther Sutherland (1932–1986), American actress
- Euan Sutherland (born 1969), Scottish businessman, CEO of the Co-operative Group
- Fern Sutherland (born 1987), New Zealand actress
- Gary Sutherland (1944–2024), American baseball player
- Gavin Sutherland (disambiguation), multiple people
- Gavin & Iain Sutherland, the Sutherland Brothers, British folk and rock music duo
- George Sutherland (disambiguation), multiple people
- Sir Gordon Sutherland (1907–1980), Scottish physicist
- Graham Sutherland (1903–1980), English artist
- Hal Sutherland (1929–2014), American animator and painter
- Harriet Sutherland-Leveson-Gower, Duchess of Sutherland (1806–1868), British courtier and philanthropist
- Heather Sutherland (historian) (born 1943), Australian historian
- Howard Sutherland (1865–1950), American politician
- Humphrey Sutherland (1908–1986), English numismatist
- Iain Sutherland (disambiguation) or Ian Sutherland, several persons
- Ivan Sutherland (born 1938), American computer scientist and Internet pioneer
- Jabez G. Sutherland (1825–1902), U.S. Representative from Michigan
- James Sutherland (disambiguation), multiple people
- Jeff Sutherland (born 1941), American software developer
- Dame Joan Sutherland (1926–2010), Australian opera singer
- Jock Sutherland (1889–1948), American football player and coach
- Joel Sutherland (disambiguation), multiple people
- John Sutherland (disambiguation), multiple people
- Josiah Sutherland (1804–1887), New York lawyer and politician
- Keaton Sutherland (born 1997), American football player
- Kenneth F. Sutherland (1888–1954), New York politician
- Keston M. Sutherland (born 1976), British poet
- Kev F. Sutherland (born 1961), Scottish comedian and comic strip creator
- Kevin Sutherland (born 1964), American professional golfer
- Kiefer Sutherland (born 1966), Canadian actor
- Kimble Sutherland (born 1966), Canadian politician
- Kristine Sutherland (born 1955), American actress
- Larry Sutherland (1951–2005), New Zealand politician
- Leslie Sutherland (1892–1967), Australian aviator
- Dame Lucy Sutherland (1903–1980), British historian and university college head
- Luke Sutherland (born 1971), Scottish novelist and musician
- Margaret Sutherland (1897–1984), Australian composer
- Matthew R. Sutherland (1894–1971), Canadian politician
- Max Sutherland (ice hockey) (1904–1984), Canadian ice hockey player
- Michael Sutherland (born 1954), Australian politician
- Nadine Sutherland (born 1968), Jamaican singer
- Neil Sutherland (footballer) (1942–1998), Australian rules footballer
- Peter Sutherland (1946–2018), Irish politician
- Peter A. Sutherland (1933–1994), American diplomat
- Rachel Sutherland (born 1976), New Zealand field hockey player
- Ranald Sutherland, Lord Sutherland (1932–2025), Scottish judge
- Rhoda Sutherland (1907–1989), British academic
- Richard Sutherland (disambiguation), multiple people
- Robert Sutherland (1830–1878), Jamaican-Canadian lawyer
- Robert Franklin Sutherland (1859–1922), Canadian politician
- Roderick Dhu Sutherland (1862–1915), American lawyer and politician
- Rory Sutherland (born 1992), Scottish and British and Irish Lions international rugby union player
- Rosamund Sutherland (1947–2019), British mathematics educator
- Rupert Sutherland (born 1967), New Zealand geologist
- Sabrina S. Sutherland, American producer
- Selina Sutherland (1839–1909), New Zealand nurse and social worker
- Seven Sutherland Sisters, famous American family that toured the US, known for very long hair
- Sonita Sutherland (born 1987), Jamaican runner
- Solomon Sutherland (1762–1802), New York politician
- Spencer Sutherland (born 1992), American indie pop singer
- Stella Sutherland (1924–2015), Shetland writer
- Steve Sutherland (DJ) (19??–2020), British DJ
- Stewart Sutherland, Baron Sutherland of Houndwood (1941–2018), Scottish public servant and philosopher of religion
- Struan Sutherland (1936–2002), Australian toxicologist
- Stuart Sutherland (1927–1998), British psychologist
- Sylvia Sutherland, Canadian politician
- Thomas Sutherland (disambiguation), multiple people
- Trevor Sutherland (born 1946), Jamaican-British reggae musician
- Trevor Sutherland (born 1954), New Zealand cricketer
- Tui T. Sutherland (born 1978), Venezuelan-American children's author
- Victor Sutherland (1889–1968), American stage, film, and television actor
- Walter Sutherland (1890–1918), Scottish rugby union footballer
- William Sutherland (disambiguation), multiple people
- Zena Sutherland (1915–2002), American children's literature critic and author

== Fictional characters ==
- William Sutherland, a fictional character in the anime Gundam SEED
- Beth Sutherland in Australian soap opera Home and Away
- Beth Sutherland in British soap opera Coronation Street
- Dani Sutherland in Australian soap opera Home and Away
- Katie Sutherland in British sitcom The Inbetweeners
- Kevin Sutherland in British sitcom The Inbetweeners
- Kirk Sutherland in British soap opera Coronation Street
- Max Sutherland in Australian soap opera Home and Away
- Maria Sutherland in British soap opera Coronation Street
- Neil Sutherland in British sitcom The Inbetweeners
- Rhys Sutherland in British soap opera Coronation Street
- Victoria Sutherland, vampire in American film series The Twilight Saga
- Peter Sutherland, an FBI agent in the American TV series The Night Agent
