= Dickens in America =

2005 television documentary

- Genre: Documentary
- Directed by: Christopher Swann; Sarah Howitt; Richard Shaw
- Presented by: Miriam Margolyes
- Theme music composer: Giles Lamb
- Country of origin: United Kingdom
- Original language: English
- No. of seasons: 1
- No. of episodes: 10

Production
- Executive producers: Andrew Lockyer; Richard Shaw; Colin Cameron; Krishan Arora
- Camera setup: Single camera
- Running time: 30 minutes
- Production companies: British Broadcasting Corporation; Lion Television Scotland

Original release
- Network: BBC4
- Release: April 5 – June 7, 2005

Dickens in America is a 2005 television documentary following Charles Dickens's travels across the United States in 1842, during which the young journalist penned a travel book, American Notes for General Circulation. It is hosted by British actress Miriam Margolyes, a lifelong fan of Dickens, and intersperses history with travelogue and interviews. It was produced by Lion Television Scotland for BBC Four. Nathaniel Parker provided the voice of Dickens, quoting from his texts throughout the journey.

== Overview ==
Margolyes developed a love of Dickens' work when she was 11 years old and read Oliver Twist, and was inspired to create the series due to the small number of people who were familiar with American Notes. Margolyes received an Olivier Award nomination for her one-woman show Dickens' Women, in which she portrayed 23 characters from the novels and short stories. The show was originally devised for the 1989 Edinburgh Festival and Margolyes continued to reprise the role through to the Dickens bicentennial celebrations in 2012.

Dickens sailed for the United States on January 3, 1842, leaving Liverpool with his wife Catherine on board the steamship RMS Britannia. During the five-month trip, Dickens travelled by ship, railway and stagecoach as far west as St Louis and as far north as Quebec. He visited countless social institutions across all levels of society as well as making a specific trip to Richmond, Virginia to observe slavery firsthand, about which he wrote scathingly on his return to the United Kingdom.

Margolyes follows Dickens' route, leaving the UK on the Queen Mary 2, the contemporary equivalent flagship of Cunard, and wherever possible sleeping in the same inns and visiting the same sites that the author did. She traces both Dickens' own experiences as a travelling celebrity and the differences and similarities of the American culture which so shocked him. The series has been reviewed as being "far from... a critical academic analysis of Dickens' narrative of his 1842 journey" but as a work designed to bring viewers closer to the author with the aid of Margolyes' "subjective opinions".

== Home media ==
The DVD of the series was released in North America on 1 March 2011.

== Episodes ==
No. overall	No. in season	Title	Original release date
1	1	"The Passage Out"	5 April 2005
Miriam rereads American Notes and visits the Victoria and Albert Museum and Charles Dickens Museum in London to learn about Dickens' plans for the American trip. Miriam boards the RMS Queen Mary 2 and receives a behind-the-scenes tour of the ship before she disembarks in New York and heads north to Boston. Guests: Professor Lisa Jardine, Jan Mark.
2	2	"Boston"	12 April 2005
Miriam visits numerous tourist spots in Boston as well as the Massachusetts Historical Society and the Boston Museum of Fine Arts, where she views a portrait of Dickens by Francis Alexander which is not kept on general view. Miriam stays at the Omni Parker House where Dickens stayed and then visits the Perkins School for the Blind. Dickens' praise of the school inspired Helen Keller's mother to send her daughter there.
3	3	"New England"	19 April 2005
Miriam travels by train to Lowell, Massachusetts and Boston University, where she learns about Dickens' interest in factories and working people, as well as the generally negative reviews American Notes received in the USA. After a Dickens-themed barbeque, Margolyes visits the Supreme Court of Massachusetts and learns about Dickens' understanding of human nature. She takes a boat down the Connecticut River to New Haven seeing a replica of the slave ship La Amistad and a progressive church, which was another cause close to Dickens' heart.
4	4	"New York City"	26 April 2005
Miriam takes a train to New York City. Here she learns of Dickens' challenged relationship with international copyrights, his concerns about the lack of successful social reform in the US, and the Boz Ball which was held in Dickens' honour on Valentine's Day, 1842, which became the social event of the decade. Miriam travels to Roosevelt Island in the middle of the East River where Dickens visited a lunatic asylum, and then travels with police officers on night shift throughout Greenwich Village. Guest: Michael Patrick Hearn
5	5	"Philadelphia"	3 May 2005
In Philadelphia, Margolyes witnesses the only full-length statue of Charles Dickens, contradicting the author's express wish not to be memorialised in sculpture. Miriam visits the Dickens Fellowship, the Wanamaker Organ and Pennsylvania Hospital - all sites of Dickens' tour - as well as Eastern State Penitentiary, about which Dickens wrote at length. He was permitted to speak with some of the inmates during his journey.
6	6	"Washington DC and Richmond"	10 May 2005
Miriam follows in Dickens' footsteps by taking a boat down the Potomac River to Washington DC. Miriam learns that Dickens did not think Washington would survive as the capital of the US, since it had no strong non-government services or purpose to the country. Miriam tours the Library of Congress before going by train to Richmond, Virginia where she visits a tobacco farm. Dickens visited Richmond in the hopes of understanding the South's endorsement of slavery. Miriam meets Southern journalists and reverends, and is confronted by their opinions. Guests: Juan Williams, Bill Schneider
7	7	"Pittsburgh to Louisville"	17 May 2005
In Pittsburgh, Miriam learns about Dickens' interest in mesmerism and meets a Civil Rights Attorney specialising in prisoners' rights. She takes a paddleboat steamer down the Ohio River to Cincinnati, where she sees the beauty which Dickens cherishes and a first edition of Dombey and Son at the Mercantile Library. Miriam attends an etiquette dinner, noting that Dickens commented extensively on the perceived bad manners of Americans. Finally, in Louisville, Kentucky, Miriam stays at the Galt House Hotel. She meets linguist Martha Banette to understand the difference between Southern and Northern American Speech. Miriam is surprised by how Louisville locals can't agree on the pronunciation of their own city name.
8	8	"St Louis & The Mid West"	24 May 2005
Margolyes takes a steam-powered paddleboat down the Ohio River, following the route Dickens took. Margolyes notes that Dickens and his wife, Catherine, celebrated their 6th wedding anniversary while on the Mississippi River. Margolyes stops off in Cairo, Illinois, which served as a model for the disastrous development of Eden in Martin Chuzzlewitt. Margolyes discusses Cairo's history with Preston Ewing, Jr., a local historian. Margolyes visits a 9th grade class in St. Charles, Missouri and meets two Native Americans, from separate nations, Dana Klar and Noel Frazer. Margolyes and a companion take a picnic basket, similar to Dickens's and visit the Looking Glass Prairie.
9	9	"Canada"	31 May 2005
Originally Dickens was not going to write much about Canada, but he liked it so much that he spent five weeks there. Margolyes visits many of the same places Dickens did, including Niagara Falls and its accompanying museum, as well as Old Fort Niagara. Margolyes travels to Toronto where she meets Dickens collector Dan Calinescu of Boz and Friends Rare Books. In Montreal, she tours the city in a horse-drawn carriage, takes lessons on how to be a lady's maid, and becomes involved with a show put on by the Concordia University Theatre Department.
10	10	"Journey's End"	7 June 2005
Dickens had five days in New York before his ship sailed and he used it to see more of the state. He went up the Hudson River to West Point. Margolyes goes to visit the military academy and meets the cadets. She takes a tour of the Shaker Museum and Library in Old Chatham. Margolyes finishes her tour of America with a special performance at the Bruno Walter Auditorium at the New York Public Library on Saturday 18 December 2004. She is alone on stage and gives a riveting account of her travels. Like Dickens, Margolyes finds herself changed by her American journey.
