= Anne Sutherland =

Anne Sutherland may refer to:

- Anne Sutherland-Leveson-Gower, Duchess of Sutherland (1829–1888)
- Anne Sutherland (actress) (1867–1942), American actress
- Anne Bryson Sutherland (1922–2011), Scottish plastic surgeon

== See also ==
- Ann Sutherland (born 1943), Welsh lawn and indoor bowler
