= American Notes =

1842 book by Charles Dickens

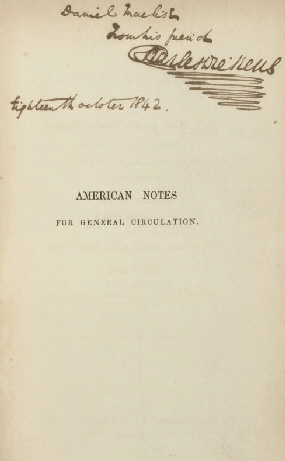
- Title page inscribed by the author to illustrator "Daniel Maclise From his friend Charles Dickens, Eighteenth October 1842", one day prior to its official publication
- Author: Charles Dickens
- Original title: American Notes for General Circulation
- Language: English
- Genre: Non-fiction
- Publisher: Chapman & Hall
- Publication date: 19 October 1842
- Publication place: England
- Media type: Print hardback, and paperback)
- Preceded by: Barnaby Rudge
- Followed by: Martin Chuzzlewit

American Notes for General Circulation is a travelogue by Charles Dickens detailing his trip to North America from January to June 1842. While there he acted as a critical observer of North American society, almost as if returning a status report on their progress. This can be compared to the style of his Pictures from Italy written four years later, where he wrote far more like a tourist. His American journey was also an inspiration for his novel Martin Chuzzlewit. Having arrived in Boston, he visited Lowell, New York, and Philadelphia, and travelled as far south as Richmond, as far west as St. Louis and as far north as Quebec. The American city he liked best was Boston – "the air was so clear, the houses were so bright and gay. [...] The city is a beautiful one, and cannot fail, I should imagine, to impress all strangers very favourably." Further, it was close to the Perkins Institution and Massachusetts Asylum for the Blind where Dickens encountered Laura Bridgman, who impressed him greatly.

== Background ==
On 3 January 1842, one month shy of his 30th birthday, Dickens sailed with his wife, Catherine, and her maid, Anne Brown, from Liverpool on board the steamship RMS Britannia bound for America. Arriving in Boston on 22 January 1842, the author was at once mobbed. Dickens at first revelled in the attention, but soon the endless demands on his time began to wear on his enthusiasm. He complained in a letter to his friend John Forster:

I can do nothing that I want to do, go nowhere where I want to go, and see nothing that I want to see. If I turn into the street, I am followed by a multitude.

He travelled mainly on the East Coast and the Great Lakes area of both the United States and Canada, primarily by steamboat, but also by rail and coach. During his extensive itinerary, he made a particular point of visiting prisons and mental institutions and even took a quick glimpse at the prairie. Among his early visits to American institutions, Dickens visited Perkins School for the Blind near Boston, where he met Laura Bridgman, who is considered the first deaf-blind person to receive a significant education in English. His account of this meeting in American Notes would inspire Helen Keller's parents to seek an education for their daughter. He was particularly critical of the American press and the sanitary conditions of American cities. He also wrote merciless parodies of the manners of the locals, including, but not limited to, their rural conversations and practice of spitting tobacco in public (Ch. 8 – Washington):

As Washington may be called the headquarters of tobacco-tinctured saliva, the time is come when I must confess, without any disguise, that the prevalence of those two odious practices of chewing and expectorating began about this time to be anything but agreeable, and soon became most offensive and sickening.

In Washington, D.C., he called upon President John Tyler in the White House, writing that:

... he looked somewhat worn and anxious, and well he might; being at war with everybody – but the expression of his face was mild and pleasant, and his manner was remarkably unaffected, gentlemanly, and agreeable. I thought that in his whole carriage and demeanour, he became his station singularly well.

Although generally impressed by what he found, he could not forgive the continued existence of slavery in the United States, which he described as "that most hideous blot and foul disgrace ..." The final chapters of the book are devoted to a criticism of the practice. He was also unhappy about copyright issues. Dickens, by this time, had become an international celebrity, but owing to the lack of an international copyright law, bootleg copies of his works were freely available in North America and he could not abide losing money. Dickens called for international copyright law in many of his speeches in America, and his persistence in discussing the subject led some critics to accuse him of having travelled to America primarily to agitate for that cause.

Dickens's letters home to his friends, including Forster and illustrator Daniel Maclise, helped to form the basis of the book.

== Critique of society in the US ==
Throughout the narrative, he notes the good and bad of American society at the time, sometimes jocularly. Then, in a conclusion, he gives a considered analysis of what he views as major flaws in US society.

He critiques slavery. Apart from its corruption of both whites and blacks in slave states, he writes, the free states are complicit in the system as well in their ignorance. He is also horrified by the physical violence vented on both male and female slaves.

Next, he places violence, writing that the American ideal of liberty seems to include the freedom to violence any other American.

Third, he cites what he calls universal distrust, the extreme individualism that leads people to suspect others and to seek advantage over them. With a few exceptions, the scandal-seeking press contributes by undermining private life and destroying confidence in public life, he writes. Allied to this is the overriding commercialism, with the urge to pull off a smart deal and the idolisation of successful businessmen. In this capitalist country, he finds most people far too serious and puritanical, lacking humour and a wider perspective.

Additionally, in many places he finds standards of personal cleanliness and public health still very primitive and is particularly disgusted by the almost universal habit of spitting.

== Title ==
According to Dickens's biographer Michael Slater, the title American Notes for General Circulation may have been a joke at the expense of American currency. The end of the Second Bank of the United States and the ensuing Panic of 1837 led to widespread bank failures and rendered much paper currency worthless.

== Documentary (2005) ==
The book formed the basis for Dickens in America (2005), an authored documentary series by Miriam Margolyes in which she followed Dickens's journey through the United States, visiting many of the places mentioned by the author in his book.
