= Alexander Sutherland (educator) =

Scottish-Australian educator, writer and philosopher

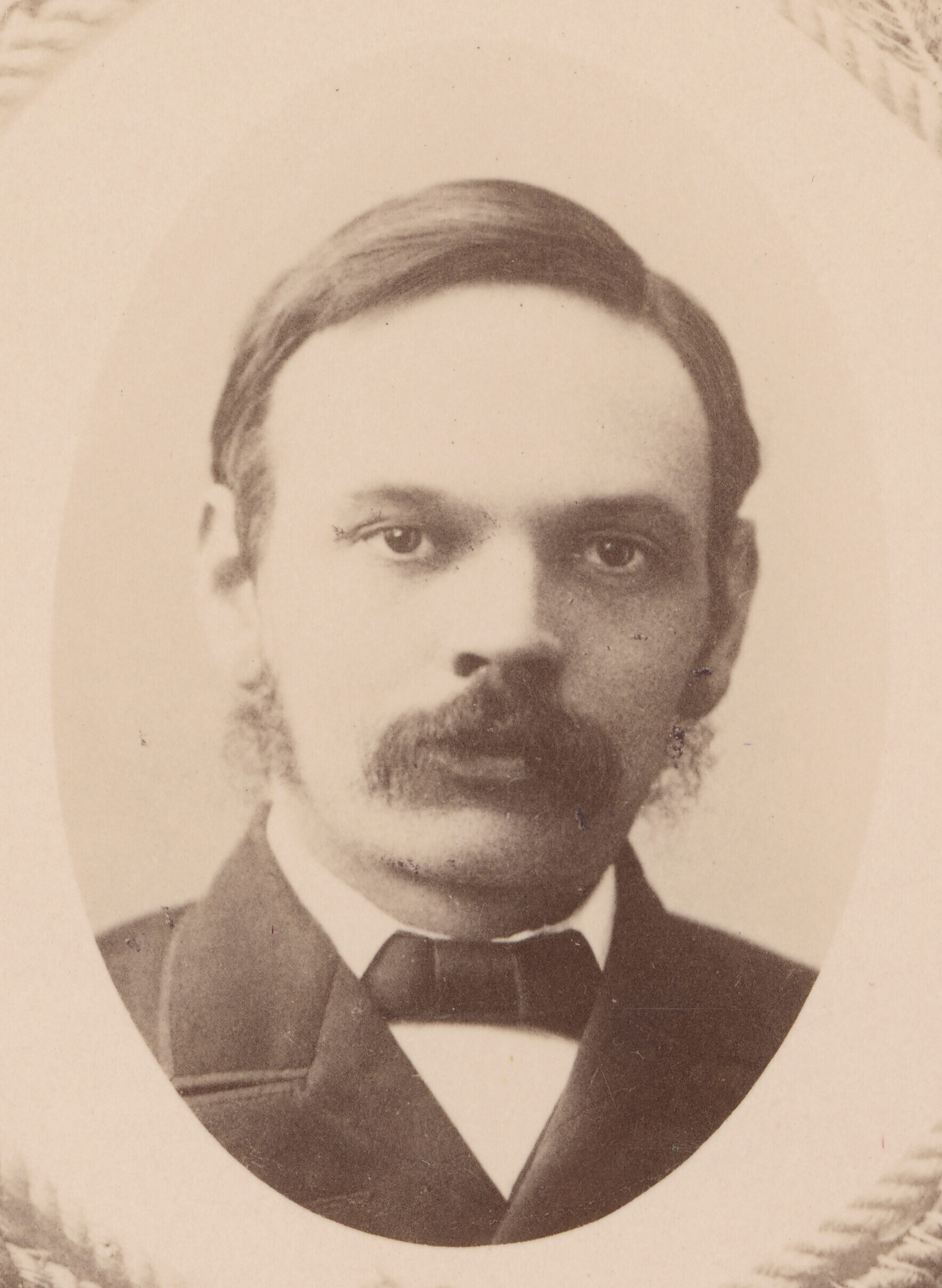
- Portrait of Sutherland, in c. 1890 – c. 1894, by Samuel Milbourn (Source: State Library of Victoria)
- Born: 26 March 1852; Glasgow, Scotland
- Died: 9 August 1902 (aged 50); Melbourne, Victoria, Australia
- Occupations: Educator; writer; philosopher; academic administrator
- Spouse: Elizabeth Jane Ballantine (m. 1879)
- Children: 6
- Parents: George Sutherland (father); Jane Smith (mother)
- Relatives: Jane Sutherland (sister); George Sutherland (brother); William Sutherland (brother); Margaret Ada Sutherland AO OBE (niece); Ruth Sutherland (niece)

Academic background
- Education: University of Melbourne

Alexander Sutherland (26 March 1852 – 9 August 1902) was a Scottish-Australian educator, writer and philosopher.

== Early life and background ==
Sutherland was born at Glasgow, both parents were Scottish, his father, George Sutherland, a carver of ship's figureheads, who was of ill health, and his mother was an engraver Jane Smith-Sutherland, a woman of character and education. His siblings include painter Jane Sutherland (1853–1928), author George Sutherland (1855–1905), and physicist William Sutherland (1859–1911). The family came to Sydney, in colonial Australia, in 1864 on account of George Sutherland's health, and Alexander, aged 14 years, became a pupil-teacher with the education department.

== Career ==
Sutherland arrived in Melbourne, Victoria in 1870, he first taught at John Meeson's Hawthorn Grammar School, then entered on the arts course at the University of Melbourne where he was taught by William Hearn, was largely supported by scholarships, and graduated with honours in 1874. For two years he was a mathematics master at Scotch College, and in 1877 succeeded George Henry Neighbour as proprietor and principal of Carlton College. The school was so successful that 15 years later he was able to retire and devote himself to literature. He was responsible for the first volume of Victoria and its Metropolis (1888), a history of the first 50 years of the state of Victoria. In 1890 he published Thirty Short Poems, the cultured verse of an experienced literary man.

Upon Hearn's death in 1888, Sutherland purchased Heronswood, on the Mornington Peninsula, as his summer residence.

The Australian banking crisis of 1893 however, affected his financial position, and he was obliged to take up journalism for the Argus and The Australasian. But his The Origin and Growth of the Moral Instinct, appeared in 1898 in two volumes. Sutherland had long brooded over this work and was greatly pleased at receiving the commendation of some of the leaders of philosophic thought in England. Generally the book was well received both in Europe and the United States. With his brother, George Sutherland, he wrote a short History of Australia, selling 120,000 copies, and he collaborated with Henry Gyles Turner in a useful volume, The Development of Australian Literature (1898). His undoubted powers as a teacher gave value to his text book, A New Geography, and other works of that kind. He contributed on scientific subjects to the nineteenth century, and did a large amount of lecturing on literature and science in Melbourne.

=== Political career ===
In 1897 he was a candidate for parliament, but he failed to win the seat of Williamstown in the Victorian Legislative Assembly. In 1898, he went to London as representative of the South Australian Register, but found the climate oppressed him and returned to Australia towards the end of 1899. He continued his journalistic work in Melbourne, and in March 1901 was an unsuccessful candidate for the Southern Melbourne seat in the first federal parliament. Soon afterwards he was appointed by the council of the University of Melbourne to the position of registrar.

== Personal life and later achievements ==
Sutherland married Elizabeth Jane "Lizzie" Ballantine (1854 – 14 June 1939) in Hobart on 26 March 1879 and lived at Dunrobin, 31 Alma Road, St Kilda, and later in Chaucer Crescent, Canterbury, as well as Heronswood. They had six children, including a son who was killed in France in World War I.

The university was passing through a difficult time that impacted Sutherland's health. Professor Morris died on 1 January 1902 while on leave in Europe; and Sutherland took over his lectures on English literature. The burden of the extra work was too great for Sutherland who did not have a strong constitution, and he died suddenly on 9 August 1902. He was survived by his wife, a son, and three daughters. His estate sold Heronswood to Sutherland's close friend, jurist H. B. Higgins.
