= Bill Sutherland =

Bill Sutherland may refer to:

- Bill Sutherland (ice hockey) (1934–2017), Canadian NHL player
- Bill Sutherland (Toronto politician) (1926/27–1998), Canadian municipal politician
- T. Bill Sutherland (born 1942), American theoretical physicist
- Bill Sutherland (racewalker) (born 1945), Scottish athlete

== See also ==
- William Sutherland (disambiguation)
