= Thomas Sutherland =

Thomas Sutherland may refer to:

- Thomas W. Sutherland (ca. 1817–1859), early settler and attorney in San Diego, California
- Thomas Sutherland (banker) (1834–1922), Scottish banker in Hong Kong
- Thomas Sutherland (British Army officer) (1888–1946), British Army officer
- Thomas Sutherland (academic) (1931–2016), former Dean of Agriculture in Lebanon, kidnapped by Islamic Jihad
- Thomas Sutherland (cricketer) (1880–?), English first-class cricketer
- Thomas Sutherland (artist) (1785–1838), painter of maritime and naval subjects

== See also ==
- Tom Sutherland (disambiguation)
