= Alexander Sutherland =

Alexander Sutherland may refer to:

- Alexander Sutherland (educator) (1852–1902), Scottish-Australian educator, writer and philosopher
- Zander Sutherland (born 1987), Scottish footballer
- Alexander Sutherland (politician) (1849–1884), lawyer and political figure in Manitoba
