= Nina Needs to Go! =

Children's television series

- Written by: Bradley Zweig
- Directed by: Sarah Cox
- Creative directors: Emma Lazenby; Matthew Walker; Sylvia Bull
- Voices of: Aubree Young; Miriam Margolyes; Colleen O'Shaughnessey; Jess Harnell; Josie Totah
- Composers: Jean-Mark Pestas; Christian Siddel
- Countries of origin: United States; United Kingdom
- Original language: English
- No. of seasons: 1
- No. of episodes: 20

Production
- Executive producer: Helen Brundson
- Producer: Kaia Rose
- Editors: Zurine Ainz; Stephen Perkins; Claire Dodgson; Katie Bryer; Yulia Martynova; Ben Campbell
- Running time: 2-3 minutes
- Production company: ArthurCox

Original release
- Network: Disney Junior
- Release: February 6, 2014 – 2017

Nina Needs to Go! is an animated series of shorts that aired on Disney Junior, beginning on February 6, 2014 and ending sometime in 2017. Each short is approximately three minutes long. It was produced by Bristol-based animation studio ArthurCox, and written by Bradley Zweig.

== Overview ==
The titular 4-year-old Nina goes to a variety of settings, like the zoo and the beach. In each location, Nina finds she "needs to go" to the bathroom after becoming too engrossed in something such as play or looking at the scenery, and the mission is to get her there before it is too late. This is always accomplished by her Nana, who takes her to the bathroom in time and performs several different stunts.

The scenario is familiar to parents of preschoolers the world over and inspired by real life. Sarah Cox, Creative Director and CEO of ArthurCox has explained: "Nina Needs To Go is based on my real experiences with my daughter. Dramatic car journeys, missed trains and a back track through the whole of the Alhambra in Spain in search of a bathroom are real situations that have inspired each episode. A fabulous creative team has helped us create action-packed 'race against time' scenarios to excite and amuse a family audience."

== Characters ==
- Nina: a 4-year-old girl, title character of the series, voiced by Aubree Young
- Nana: Sheila, Nina and Frank's British grandmother. She would show up in most episodes to help Nina reach the bathroom in time. Voiced by Miriam Margolyes
- Kate: Nina and Frank's mother, voiced by Colleen O'Shaughnessey
- Nat: Nina and Frank's father, voiced by Jess Harnell
- Frank: Nina's older brother, voiced by Josie Totah
- Amber: Nina's best friend
- Gladys: Nina's aunt
- Walter: Nina's uncle

== Episodes ==
The episodes are:

1. "Train" – Nina needs to use the bathroom on a train. Trouble ensues when the train is crowded; her mother and herself try to get past a band, then she and her dad end up trapped in the quiet car until her Nana comes to the rescue.
2. "Snow" – Nina insists that she does not have to use the bathroom until she and her mother are on a ski lift and Nina realises the bathroom is at the bottom of the mountain.
3. "Mall" – Nina needs to use the bathroom while buying a dress at the mall so she and Nana race to the bathroom to get there in time.
4. "Play" – Nina must use the bathroom while dressed as a rock for a play but she gets stuck in a doorway until Nana comes right on time.
5. "Water Park" – Nina’s brother Frank tries to help her find a bathroom at a water park and Nana comes to the rescue.
6. "Beach" – Nina suddenly has to use the bathroom while building sand castles at the beach but is distracted by showers and volleyball so Nana is here to help.
7. "DIY" – Nina has to go to the bathroom while visiting a hardware store with her father to buy paint.
8. "Zoo" – Nina needs to use the bathroom while at the zoo so her and Nana take a ride through the zoo.
9. "Camping" – Nina does not want to relieve herself in the woods, however, there are no bathrooms in the woods so Nana makes a makeshift outhouse for Nina with the help from the animals.
10. "Tower" – Nina has to go to the bathroom on a trip to the Tower of London but she accidentally sets off the alarm when trying to touch a jewel.
11. "County Fair" – Nina’s brother Frank tries to help her find a bathroom during a three-legged race. She and Nana make it in time after winning a toy duck.
12. "Parade" – Nina needs to use the bathroom while dressed as a mermaid on a parade float but when she gets to the bathroom there is no toilet paper until she gets some from Frank’s mummy costume.
13. "Wedding" – Nina needs to use the bathroom during Aunt Gladys' wedding. She and Frank try to get to the bathroom but Frank is distracted by fruit punch and the conga line until Nana calls out to cut the cake.
14. "Traffic" – Nina has to use the bathroom while her family gets stuck in traffic en route to Aunt Gladys' trailer but when she and Nana get to the rest stop the bathroom is closed, so Aunt Gladys lets her use her bathroom.
15. "Library" – Nina has to use the bathroom while being read a story about a knight during story time so she and Nana take the library express.
16. "To Sleep" – Nina is unable to go to sleep until Nana gives her a book to read until she falls asleep.
17. "On a Playdate" – Nina goes on a playdate with Amber but make a big mess, so Nana shows them how to clean up.
18. "To the Museum" – Nina gets lost in a museum and Nana must get her back to her dad before he notices she is gone.
19. "To a Fancy Restaurant" – Nina's meatball falls off of her plate and she chases it.
20. "To Preschool" – Nina is scared to go to preschool until she accidentally leaves the door open to let the hamster escape and she and Nana race to get it back.
