= George Sutherland (disambiguation) =

George Sutherland (1862–1942) was an English-born U.S. jurist and political figure.

George Sutherland may also refer to:

- George Sutherland (author) (1855–1905), Scottish-born Australian writer
- George Sutherland (athlete) (1903–1951), Canadian athlete
- George Sutherland (footballer) (1876–1956), Australian rules footballer
- George Alexander Sutherland (1861–1939), British cardiologist and paediatrician
- George B. Sutherland, American artist and teacher
- George Eaton Sutherland (1843–1899), American politician and jurist

== See also ==
- George Sutherland Fraser (1915–1980), Scottish poet, literary critic and academic
- George Sutherland-Leveson-Gower, 2nd Duke of Sutherland (1786–1861), son of George Leveson-Gower, 1st Duke of Sutherland
- George Sutherland-Leveson-Gower, 3rd Duke of Sutherland (1828–1892), son of the 2nd Duke
- George Sutherland-Leveson-Gower, 5th Duke of Sutherland (1888–1963), son of the 4th Duke
