= George Sutherland (author) =

Australian journalist and writer

George Sutherland (1 October 1855 – 1 December 1905), was a Scottish-born Australian journalist and writer.

== Biography ==
He was taken to Sydney, New South Wales in 1864 with his family where he attended Sydney Grammar School. They moved to Melbourne in 1870 and he continued school at Scotch College. He graduated from the University of Melbourne in 1877. After teaching for some time he took up journalism and worked for the South Australian Register from 1881 to 1902, after which he joined the Melbourne Age.

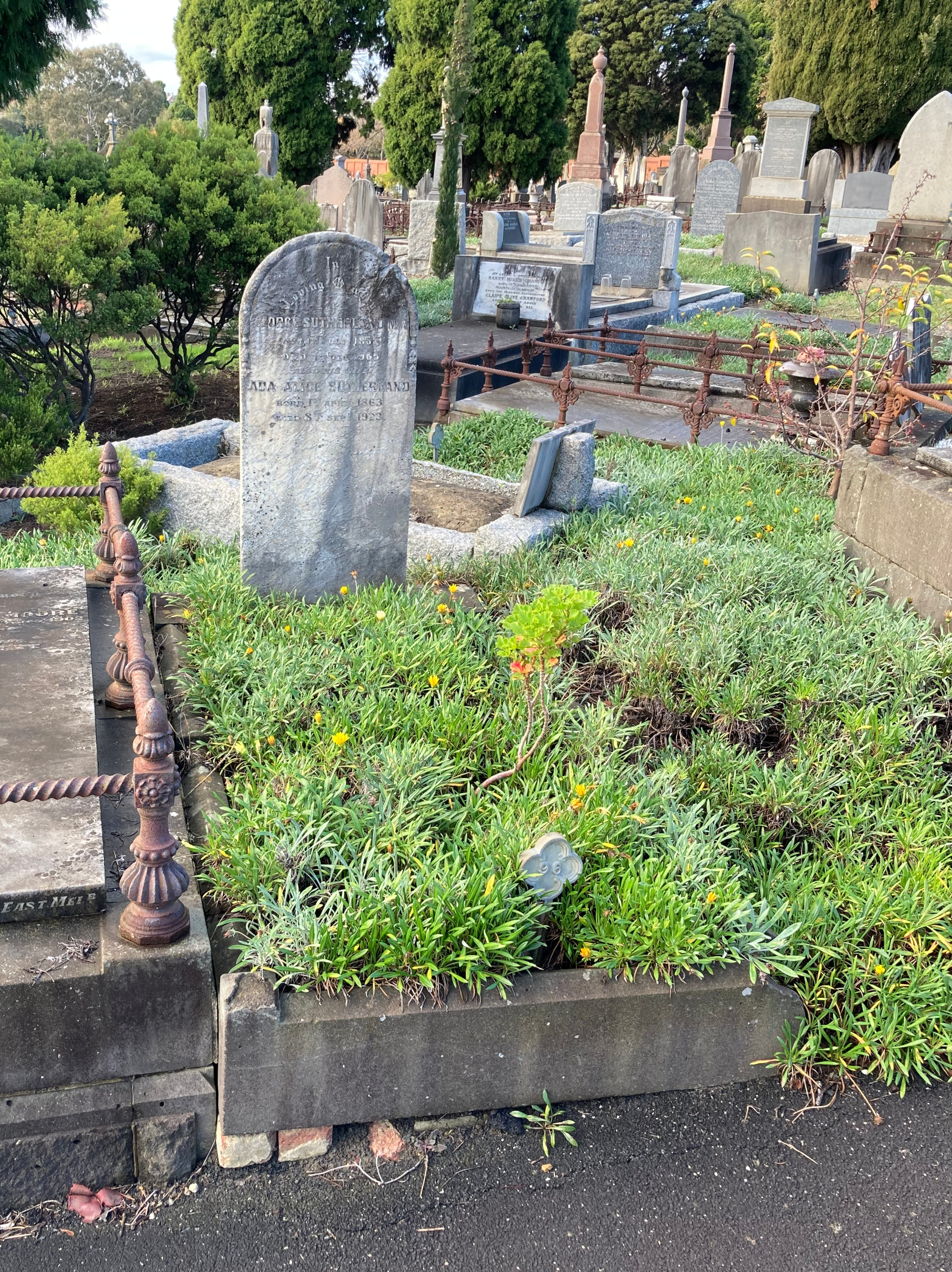
Sutherland's grave at Boroondara General Cemetery

His published works include:

- The History of Australia (1877), with his brother Alexander Sutherland
- Tales of the Goldfields (1880)
- Australia: Or, England in the South (1886)
- The South Australian Company (1898)
- Twentieth Century Inventions (1901)

Other works related to vinegrowing and livestock handling.

== Family ==
His mother was an engraver and his father a carver. His siblings included the educator Alexander Sutherland, the painter Jane Sutherland, and the physicist William Sutherland. He was the father of the composer Margaret Sutherland and artist Ruth Sutherland.
