= James Sutherland =

James Sutherland may refer to:

== Politics ==
- James Sutherland (Wisconsin politician) (1820–1905), Wisconsin politician
- James Sutherland (Canadian politician) (1849–1905), Canadian politician
- James Miller Sutherland (1853–1921), lawyer and political figure in Prince Edward Island, Canada

== Sports ==
- James T. Sutherland (1870–1955), "Father of Hockey"
- James Sutherland (footballer) (1881–?), Scottish footballer who played as a winger
- Jim Sutherland (Australian footballer) (1900–1973), Australian rules footballer
- Jim Sutherland (1914–1980), American football coach
- James Sutherland (cricket administrator) (born 1965), CEO of Cricket Australia

== Other ==
- James Sutherland (botanist) (c. 1639–1719), first professor of botany at the University of Edinburgh, from 1676 to 1705
- James Sutherland (bushranger) (1865–1883), Australian bushranger active in Tasmania
- James H. Sutherland (1872–1932), Scottish born soldier and elephant hunter
- James Sutherland (Nip/Tuck), fictional character in American television series
- James W. Sutherland (1918–1987), United States Army general
- James Runcieman Sutherland (1900–1996), English literary scholar
- James Sutherland, 2nd Lord Duffus (died 1705), Scottish nobleman

== See also ==
- James Southerland (born 1990), American basketball player
