= David Sutherland =

David Sutherland may refer to:

- David Sutherland (baseball) (born 1985), Australian baseball player
- David Sutherland (comics) (1933–2023), Scottish comic book artist
- David Sutherland (cricketer) (1873–1971), Australian cricketer
- David Sutherland (golfer) (born 1966), American golfer
- David Sutherland (politician) (1803–1879), Scottish merchant, farmer and politician in South Australia
- David C. Sutherland III (1949–2005), American game designer
- David S. Sutherland (born 1948/49), American businessman
- David Sutherland (filmmaker) (born 1945), American documentary filmmaker
- Sudz Sutherland (David Sutherland), Canadian film maker
- David Macbeth Sutherland (1883–1973), Scottish artist
- David Sutherland (British Army officer) (1920–2006)
- D. M. Sutherland (1874–1951), British journalist and editor
- David Waters Sutherland (1872–1939), Australian physician
- David Sutherland (rugby union), Scottish rugby union referee
