= William Sutherland (physicist) =

Scottish-Australian theoretical physicist, chemist and writer

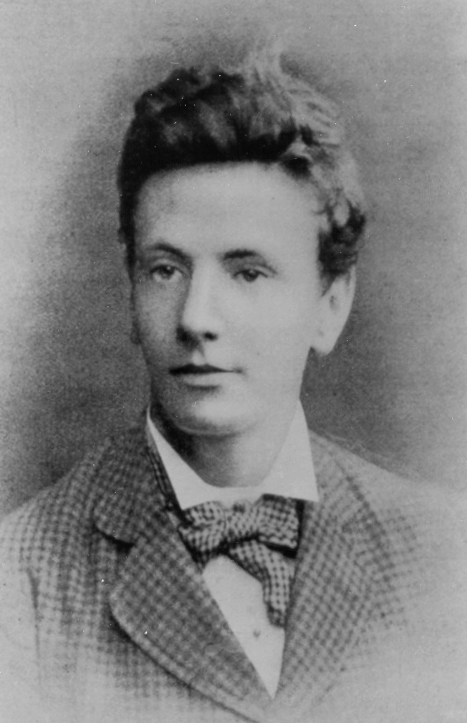
- Sutherland in his twentieth year
- Born: 24 August 1859; Glasgow, Lanarkshire, Scotland
- Died: 5 October 1911 (aged 52); Kew, Melbourne, Victoria, Australia
- Education: University of Melbourne (B.A., M.A.); University College London (B.Sc.)

William Sutherland (24 August 1859 – 5 October 1911) was a Scottish-born Australian theoretical physicist, physical chemist and writer for The Age (Melbourne) newspaper.

== Early life and education ==
Sutherland was born in Glasgow, Scotland, son of George Sutherland, a woodcarver, and engraver Jane Smith-Sutherland. Among his siblings were Alexander Sutherland, George Sutherland and Jane Sutherland. The family emigrated to Australia in 1864, staying in Sydney for six years and then moving to Melbourne in 1870. Sutherland later graduated from Wesley College. Martin Howy Irving was the headmaster (the second professor of classics at the University of Melbourne) but it was Henry Martyn Andrew the second master, afterwards professor of natural philosophy at the same university, whose influence was more important to Sutherland. From Wesley Sutherland enrolled at the University of Melbourne in February 1876, graduating B.A. in 1879 (first-class final honours), the scholarship in natural science, and third-class honours in engineering.

The Melbourne University council nominated Sutherland for the Gilchrist scholarship at University College London, in England. He was awarded it and in July 1879 left for England. Sutherland entered as a science student at University College London and came under the influence of Professor Carey Foster. In the final examination for the B.Sc. degree took first place and first-class honours in experimental physics and the clothworkers scholarship (£50 for two years). Sutherland had not enjoyed his time in England and arrived back in Melbourne in February 1882.

== Career ==
Sutherland's home life meant a lot to him, other members of his family excelled in either literature, music or art.Sutherland was offered the position of superintendent of the School of Mines, Ballarat, in July 1882 but he declined the offer as was it was too far from the public library and his home. Sutherland for many years earned just enough to pay his way by contributing articles to the press and acting as an examiner; the rest of his time was given to scientific research. In 1884 he applied unsuccessfully for the University of Adelaide chair of chemistry, and in 1888 when the professor of natural philosophy Henry Martyn Andrew died, Sutherland was appointed lecturer at the University of Melbourne until the chair could be filled. Through the Victorian agent-general in London Sutherland had applied for this position, but the application was reportedly mis-filed and was not considered. In 1897 Professor Thomas Ranken Lyle was appointed and when he was away on leave, Sutherland was again made lecturer. In 1885 Sutherland had begun contributing to the Philosophical Magazine and for the next 25 years averaged about two articles a year to it. Sutherland was a leader writer and regular contributor to the Melbourne Age for the last 10 years of his life, particularly on scientific subjects. Sutherland declined an offer of an appointment on the staff of the paper. Sutherland wrote on such topics as the surface tension of liquids, diffusion, the rigidity of solids, the properties of solutions (including an influential analysis of the structure of water), the origin of spectra and the source of the Earth's magnetic field. Sutherland devoted most of his time to scientific research. A list of 69 of Sutherland's contributions to scientific magazines appears in W. A. Osborne's, William Sutherland a Biography. Sutherland died quietly in his sleep on 5 October 1911 from a ruptured heart.

== Legacy ==
Sutherland was a well-built man, just under medium height and very quiet in manner. He could have been a good musician or a painter if he had been able to give the time. An early papers that brought Sutherland into notice was on the viscosity of gases, this appeared in the December 1893 edition of Philosophical Magazine. Other papers dealt with the viscosity of water, the constitution of water, atomic sizes, molecular attractions and ionization and ionic velocities. A discussion of Sutherland's scientific work appeared in chapter VI of Osborne's biography of Sutherland, but its full value could only be calculated by another physicist who was willing to collate Sutherland's papers with the state of knowledge at the time. It was well known and valued in America, Germany and England. Professor T. R. Lyle said at the time of Sutherland's death that he was "the greatest authority living in molecular physics". Modest and selfless, Sutherland was happy to add to human knowledge and to trust that someone else would carry on the work. Sutherland never married.

Sutherland wrote an equation describing Brownian motion and diffusion which was published in a 1904 paper, which he presented at a Dunedin ANZAAS conference. Albert Einstein's first published work on the same topic was published in 1905.
