= Dickens' Women =

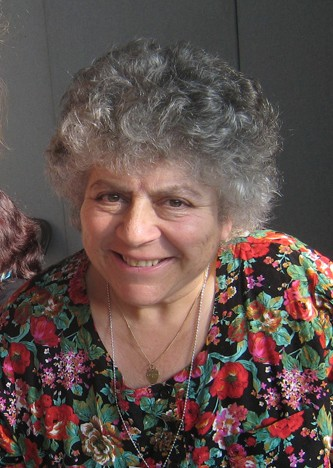
- Miriam Margolyes in 2008
- Written by: Miriam Margolyes; Sonia Fraser
- Characters: 23 characters from Dickens' fiction and life

Premiere
- Date: 1989
- Place: Edinburgh Festival

Dickens' Women is a one person show written by Miriam Margolyes and Sonia Fraser and starring Margolyes.

The play includes 23 different characters (21 women and 2 men) based on or inspired by characters in Charles Dickens' novels.

The Sydney Morning Herald wrote that the "elegantly crafted production puts the focus on the storyteller" (Dickens), highlighting his "obsession with youthful beauty and his baffling relationships with his sisters-in-law". The Age noted that it "combines character sketches, short readings, biographical material and mordant commentary".

The show was developed in 1989 for the Edinburgh Festival, and Margolyes has taken it on tour worldwide, including a 2007 tour to Australia and New Zealand. Margolyes was nominated for an Olivier Award in 1992 for her original West End season of the show.

Dickens' Women was taken on a world tour in 2012 as part of the 200th anniversary celebrations of Dickens' birth.
