= Margaret Sutherland =

Australian composer (1897–1984)

Margaret Sutherland AO OBE
- Born: 20 November 1897; Adelaide, Australia
- Died: 12 August 1984 (aged 86); Melbourne, Australia
- Known for: Music composition
- Spouse: Norman Arthur Albiston (m. 1927–1948)

Margaret Ada Sutherland AO OBE (20 November 1897 – 12 August 1984) was an Australian composer, among the best-known female musicians her country has produced.

== Career ==
Margaret Sutherland's father was George Sutherland, a journalist and writer and member of a prominent Scottish-Australian family. The painter Jane Sutherland was her aunt and the physicist and mathematician William Sutherland was her uncle. Her sister, Ruth Sutherland was a painter and writer.

Her first piano teacher was another aunt, Julia Sutherland (1861-1930), a pupil of Louis Pabst, a German émigré then considered to be Melbourne's leading piano teacher (himself a pupil of Anton Rubinstein, and Percy Grainger's first teacher). A student of Edward Goll in Australia and of Sir Arnold Bax in London during the 1920s, Sutherland wrote pieces in almost all forms, but particularly concentrated on the genre of chamber music. Her major works include a symphony, The Four Temperaments (orchestrated by Robert W. Hughes in 1964), concertos for various instruments (including violin), a symphonic poem entitled Haunted Hills (1953), and the chamber opera The Young Kabbarli (1964; libretto by Maie Casey). A severe stroke in 1969 ended her composing career.

Despite the emphasis on non-vocal works in her total output, one of Sutherland's most recognised pieces is "In the Dim Counties" (1936) for voice and piano accompaniment from Five Songs. Sutherland sets her music to the poetry of Shaw Neilson, considered a "pastoral lyric poet" from Australia whose verse has "simplicity of form and restraint of utterance". Sutherland captures this through sharp rhythms, light instrumentation and "even musical balance". Five Songs has been recorded by numerous Australian female artists such as Helen Noonan. A recording of her Trio in C major (1935), from a manuscript only recently rediscovered at the University of Melbourne, was issued in 2026.

== Personal life ==
In 1927 Margaret Sutherland married a Melbourne physician and psychiatrist, Norman Arthur Albiston. They had a son (Mark, 1928) and a daughter (Jennifer, 1930, who predeceased her mother). The marriage did not last, and they divorced in 1948. Although Norman was a music lover, he believed that a woman aspiring to be a composer was an indicator of mental derangement, and at one time he discussed his wife's mental state with Felix Werder.

== Honours ==
The University of Melbourne conferred an honorary doctorate of music on Margaret Sutherland in 1969.

She was appointed an Officer of the Order of the British Empire (OBE) in the 1970 Queen's Birthday Honours. She was awarded the Queen Elizabeth II Silver Jubilee Medal in 1977. She was appointed an Officer of the Order of Australia in the 1981 Queen's Birthday Honours.

== Selected works not mentioned above ==
- 6 Australian Songs (1950–1962), for 1 voice and piano, settings of poems by Judith Wright
1. "Midnight"
2. "Winter Kestrel"
3. "The Old Prison"
4. "Woman's Song"
5. "The Twins"
6. "Bullocky"
- Extension, for solo piano (1967)
- Four Blake Songs, for 1 voice and piano (1957)
- Two Chorale Preludes on Bach's Chorales, for solo piano (1935)
1. "Herzliebster Jesu"
2. "Jesu, meine Freude"
- Suite on a Theme by Purcell, for orchestra (1938)
- Concertino for Piano and Orchestra (1940)
- Quartet in G minor, for clarinet, horn, piano and viola (1942)
- String Quartet No. 1 (c. 1937)
- String Quartet No. 3 (1967)
- 6 Profiles, for solo piano (1947)
1. "With Animation"
2. "Expressively"
3. "Cool and Detached"
4. "A Little Fussily"
5. "Quietly Flowing"
6. "Rhythmically"
- Clarinet Sonata, for clarinet or viola and piano (c. 1948)
- Concerto for String Orchestra (1953)
- Contrasts, for 2 violins (1953)
- Discussion (String Quartet No. 2) (1954)
- Violin Concerto (1960)
- The World and the Child (1959), for mezzo voice and piano or string trio, text by Judith Wright
- Chiaroscuro I & II, for solo piano (1967)
