= Richard Sutherland (disambiguation) =

Richard K. Sutherland (1893–1966) was a US Army general.

Richard Sutherland may also refer to:

- Richard Sutherland, character in Every 9 Seconds
- Richard Sutherland (actor), actor in the 2011 film in Face to Face
- Dick Sutherland (1881–1934), actor
