= David Sutherland (cricketer) =

Australian cricketer

Personal information
- Born: 4 June 1873; Hawthorn, Melbourne, Australia
- Died: 6 October 1971 (aged 98); Hawthorn, Melbourne, Australia
- Batting: Right-handed

Domestic team information
- Years: Team
- 1896/97–1900/01: Victoria
- Source: Cricinfo, 27 July 2015

David Sutherland (4 June 1873 – 6 October 1971) was an Australian cricketer. He played six first-class cricket matches for Victoria between 1896–97 and 1900–01.

Born at Hawthorn in Melbourne in 1873, Sutherland was a member of Melbourne Cricket Club for more than 80 years. He scored a total of 516 runs for Victoria, including 180 scored against Tasmania in January 1901. This innings involved a partnership of 206 runs made with William McCormack which set a record for the second-wicket for Victoria.

Sutherland died at Hawthorn in 1971. He was aged 99.
