= Tom Sutherland =

Tom Sutherland may refer to:

- Tom Sutherland (footballer) (1910–1981), Australian rules footballer
- Tom Sutherland (sport shooter) (1932–2008), New Zealand rifle shooter
