= Henry Martyn Andrew =

English-born professor of mathematics

Henry Martyn Andrew (3 January 1845 – 18 September 1888) was an English-born professor of mathematics and natural philosophy at the Royal Agricultural College, Cirencester, and later professor of Natural Philosophy at the Melbourne University.

Andrew, son of Rev. Matthew Andrew and his wife Louisa, née Job, was born at Bridgnorth, Shropshire, England. He was educated at several English and Continental schools, and after his arrival in Victoria in 1857, at the Church of England grammar school, Melbourne, under the Rev. Dr. Bromby. He entered the University of Melbourne in 1861, and graduated B.A. in 1864, with the scholarship in mathematics and natural philosophy, and first-class honours in natural science. He was appointed in June of that year lecturer on civil engineering, being the first graduate of Melbourne to be appointed to office in the University, and resigned the position in June 1868 on his departure for England. He also resigned the second mastership of Wesley College, Melbourne, which he had accepted in 1866; and on his arrival in England in Oct. 1868 he entered St. John's College, Cambridge, where in 1870 he was second foundation scholar and a Wright's prizeman. He graduated BA as 27th wrangler in Jan. 1872, accepted the professorship of mathematics and natural philosophy at the Royal Agricultural College, Cirencester, took his M.A. degree in 1875, returned to Wesley College, Melbourne, in the same year as second master under Professor Irving, whom he succeeded as head master at Christmas 1875. In 1882 he left Wesley College to succeed Mr. Pirani as Lecturer on Natural Philosophy in Melbourne University, where he became first professor on the establishment of the chair on that subject, and continued in this position until his death at Suez on 18 September 1888, whilst on leave. Professor Andrew was author of a paper on "Brain Waves," joint author with the late Mr. F. J. Pirani, M.A., C.E., of an edition of the first three books of Euclid, graduated M.A. at Melbourne University in 1867, and acted as joint secretary of the University Senate. He was three times elected a member of the University Council between and 1886. Professor Andrew was ensign in the St. John's company of the Cambridge University Volunteer Corps, and captain of the Melbourne University company; and both as a musician and a contributor to the press he did valuable work. His widow has adopted the dramatic profession, under the name of Miss Constance Edwards.
