= Jim Sutherland (Australian footballer) =

Australian rules footballer

Personal information
- Full name: James Scott Sutherland
- Born: 10 May 1900; Malvern, Victoria
- Died: 31 May 1973 (aged 73); Brisbane, Queensland
- Original team: Leopold

Playing career^{1}
Years	Club	Games (Goals)
1924	South Melbourne	1 (0)
- ^{1} Playing statistics correct to the end of 1924.

James Scott Sutherland (10 May 1900 – 31 May 1973) was an Australian rules footballer who played with South Melbourne in the Victorian Football League (VFL).
