= Joel Sutherland =

Joel Sutherland may refer to:

- Joel A. Sutherland (born 1980), Canadian author
- Joel Barlow Sutherland (1792–1861), member of the U.S. House of Representatives from Pennsylvania
