= Iain Sutherland =

Iain or Ian Sutherland may refer to:

- Iain Sutherland (conductor) (born 1936), British conductor
- Iain Sutherland (diplomat) (1925–1986), British diplomat
- Iain Sutherland (1948–2019), member of the Sutherland Brothers
- Ian Sutherland (bowls) (1935–1999), Welsh lawn bowler
