= William Sutherland =

William or Bill Sutherland may refer to:

== Law and politics ==
- William Sutherland of Roscommon (died 1715), Member of the Scottish Parliament
- William Andrew Sutherland (1849–1908), American lawyer and politician in New York
- William Sutherland (Northwest Territories politician) (1854–1930), Canadian politician
- William Charles Sutherland (1865–1940), Canadian politician in Saskatchewan
- William A. Sutherland (California politician) (1874–1935), American lawyer and California State Assemblyman
- William Henry Sutherland (1876–1945), Canadian physician and politician in British Columbia
- Sir William Sutherland (Liberal politician) (1880–1949), Scottish politician
- William Sutherland (Ontario politician) (1926/7–1998), Canadian politician

== Science and medicine ==
- William Sutherland (physicist) (1859–1911), Australian physicist
- William Garner Sutherland (1873–1954), American osteopath
- Bert Sutherland (William R. Sutherland, 1936–2020), American technology researcher
- T. Bill Sutherland (born 1942), American theoretical physicist
- William J. Sutherland (born 1956), British conservation biologist

== Others ==
- William Sutherland, 17th Earl of Sutherland (1708–1750), Scottish nobleman
- William Sutherland (British Army officer) (fl. 1770s), British officer in the American Revolutionary War
- William A. Sutherland (American football) (1876–1969), American football coach and lawyer
- Sir William Sutherland (police officer) (1933–2022), British police officer
- Bill Sutherland (ice hockey) (1934–2017), Canadian ice hockey player
