= Miriam Margolyes =

British and Australian comedian, writer, and actress (born 1941)

Miriam Margolyes OBE
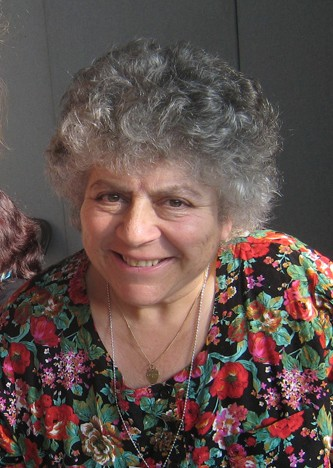
- Margolyes in 2008
- Born: 18 May 1941 (age 85); Oxford, England
- Citizenship: United Kingdom; Australia (since 2013)
- Education: Oxford High School; University of Cambridge
- Occupations: Actress; comedian; narrator; author
- Years active: 1963–present
- Known for: The Age of Innocence; Yentl; Harry Potter; End of Days
- Political party: Labour
- Other political affiliations: Workers Revolutionary Party (1970s)
- Partner: Heather Sutherland (1968–present)
- Awards: BAFTA Award for Best Actress in a Supporting Role
- Website: miriammargolyes.com

Miriam Margolyes (/ˈmɑːrɡəliːz/ MAR-gə-leez; born 18 May 1941) is a British and Australian actress and comedian. Known for her work as a character actor across film, television, and stage, she received the BAFTA for Best Supporting Actress for her role as Mrs Mingott in Martin Scorsese's The Age of Innocence (1993), and achieved international prominence with her portrayal of Professor Sprout in the Harry Potter film series (2001–2011). Margolyes was appointed Officer of the Order of the British Empire (OBE) in the 2002 New Year Honours for Services to Drama.

After starting her career in theatre, Margolyes made the transition to film with a small part in the British comedy A Nice Girl Like Me (1969). Subsequent credits include Yentl (1983), Little Shop of Horrors (1986), Little Dorrit (1988), I Love You to Death (1990), Immortal Beloved (1994), Balto (1995), Different for Girls, Romeo + Juliet (both 1996), Magnolia, End of Days (both 1999), Being Julia, and Ladies in Lavender (both 2004). She voiced roles in Babe (1995), James and the Giant Peach (1996), Mulan (1998), Happy Feet (2006), Flushed Away (2006), and Early Man (2018).

Margolyes appeared in the television films Poor Little Rich Girl: The Barbara Hutton Story (1987), Orpheus Descending (1990), Stalin (1992), Cold Comfort Farm (1995), and The Life and Death of Peter Sellers (2004). Her other credits include Blackadder (1983–1988), Vanity Fair, Supply & Demand (both 1998), and Doctor Who (2023), as well as the recurring roles of Prudence Stanley in the Australian drama series Miss Fisher's Murder Mysteries (2012–2015), and Sister Mildred in the BBC1 drama series Call the Midwife (2018–2021).

On stage, Margolyes toured her one-woman show, Dickens' Women, between 1989 and 2012, which earned her an Olivier Award nomination; starred as Sue Mengers in the Australian premiere of I'll Eat You Last (2014); and originated the role of Madame Morrible in Wicked (West End, 2006; Broadway, 2008). In 2025, she starred in the short film A Friend of Dorothy, which was nominated for the Best Live Action Short Film at the 98th Academy Awards. Outside of acting, she has fronted various travelogue series and written three memoirs: This Much Is True (2021), Oh Miriam! (2023), and The Little Book of Miriam (2025).

== Early life and education ==
Miriam Margolyes was born on 18 May 1941 in Oxford, England, into an Ashkenazi Jewish family of Russian-Jewish and Belarusian-Jewish origins. She is the only child of Joseph Margolyes (1899–1995), a Scottish-born physician and general practitioner from the Strathbungo area of Glasgow, and property developer Ruth (née Sandeman; 1905–1974), daughter of a second-hand furniture dealer and auctioneer at Kirkdale, Liverpool, who later relocated to London. The maternal family surname changed from Sandeman to Walters before Margolyes' birth. Her maternal great-grandfather, Symeon Sandmann, was born in the Polish town of Margonin, then part of the Kingdom of Prussia, which Margolyes visited in 2013. Her paternal grandfather, Philip Margolyes, was born in the small Belarusian shtetl of Amdur, then in Grodno Governorate, Russian Empire.

Margolyes attended Oxford High School and Newnham College, Cambridge. There, in her 20s, she began acting and appeared in productions by the Cambridge Footlights. She represented Newnham College in the first series of University Challenge, where she may have been one of the first people to say "fuck" on British television; she claims to have used the word in frustration on the show in 1963. The word was "bleeped out" for transmission. (Note: However, at least two others said it on British television before that: Brendan Behan on Panorama in 1956 (although his drunken slurring was not understood), and an anonymous man who painted the railings on Stranmillis Embankment alongside the River Lagan in Belfast, who in 1959 told Ulster Television's magazine show, Roundabout, that his job was "fucking boring".)

== Career ==
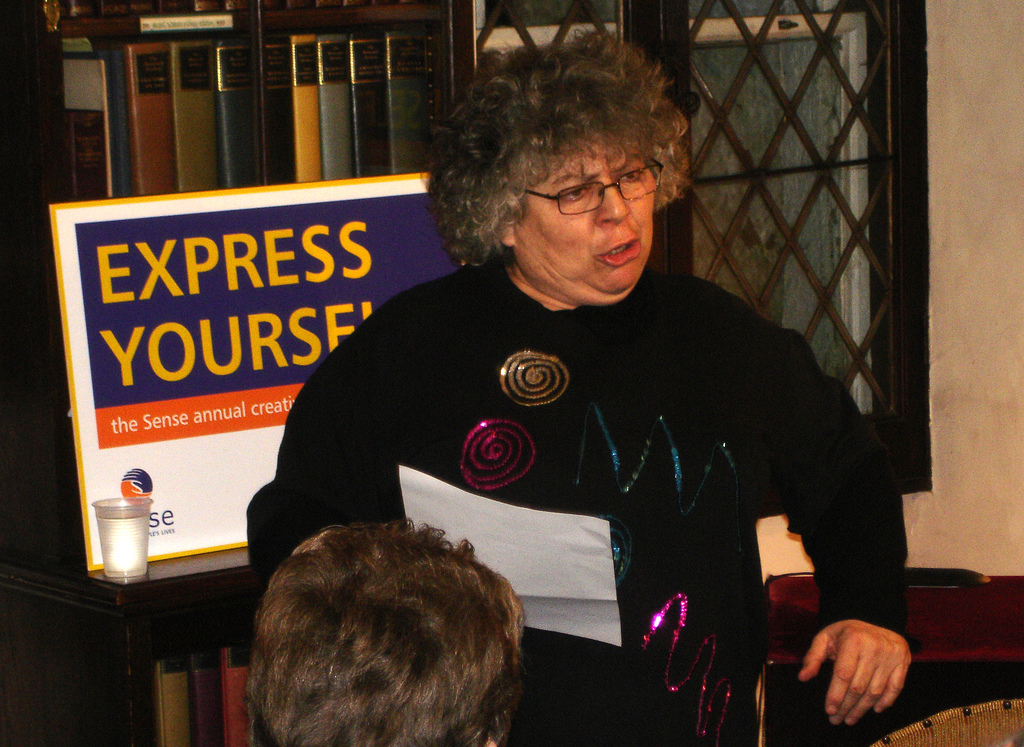
Margolyes reading Oliver Twist in 2006

With her versatile voice, Margolyes first gained recognition as a voice artist. In the 1970s, she recorded a soft-porn audio titled Sexy Sonia: Leaves from my Schoolgirl Notebook. In 1972, she played alongside Tony Robinson in the educational TV show Sam on Boffs' Island. She performed most of the supporting female characters in the dubbed Japanese action TV series Monkey. She also worked with the theatre company Gay Sweatshop and provided voiceovers in the Japanese TV series The Water Margin.

In 1974, she appeared with Kenneth Williams and Ted Ray in the BBC Radio 2 comedy series The Betty Witherspoon Show.

Margolyes's first major film role was as Elephant Ethel in Stand Up, Virgin Soldiers (1977). In the 1980s, she made appearances in Blackadder opposite Rowan Atkinson: these roles include the Spanish Infanta in The Black Adder, Lady Whiteadder in Blackadder II, and Queen Victoria in Blackadder's Christmas Carol. In 1986, she played a major supporting role in the BBC drama The Life and Loves of a She-Devil. She won the 1989 LA Critics Circle Award for Best Supporting Actress for her portrayal of Flora Finching in the film Little Dorrit (1988). On American television, she headlined the short-lived 1992 CBS sitcom Frannie's Turn. In 1994, she won the BAFTA Award for Best Supporting Actress for her role as Mrs Mingott in Martin Scorsese's The Age of Innocence (1993).

Margolyes played the dental nurse to Steve Martin's dentist in the 1986 film Little Shop of Horrors. In her 2023 memoir Oh Miriam: Stories from an Extraordinary Life, Margolyes said Martin was "undeniably brilliant, but horrid to me" during the film. Martin responded that "My memory is that we had a good communication as professional actors. But when it is implied that I harmed her or was in some way careless about doing the stunts, I have to object".

In 1989, Margolyes co-wrote and performed a one-woman show, Dickens' Women, in which she played 23 characters from Dickens' novels. In 2005, she hosted a ten-part BBC Four documentary, Dickens in America, which retraced Dickens's 1842 journey across the United States of America.

Margolyes played Aunt Sponge and voiced the Glow-Worm in James and the Giant Peach (1996). She played the Nurse in Baz Luhrmann's Romeo + Juliet (1996). She voiced the rabbit character in the animated commercials for Cadbury's Caramel bars and provided the voice of Fly the dog in the Australian-American family film Babe (1995).

She played Professor Sprout in Harry Potter and the Chamber of Secrets (2002) and again in Harry Potter and the Deathly Hallows – Part 2 (2011). In a 2011 interview on The Graham Norton Show, Margolyes said she got on well with Maggie Smith, but bluntly admitted that she "didn't like the one that died", referring to Richard Harris. In 2024, she enraged adult Harry Potter fans by stating, "I worry about Harry Potter fans because they should be over that by now. It was 25 years ago, and it's for children." Fans responded on X, one saying "Nobody has a right to try and shame people into not enjoying something they harmlessly enjoy." Louis Chilton wrote in The Independent that "Margolyes does have that right. Don't we all? And what's a bit of shame every now and then between friends?"

In 2004, Margolyes played Peg Sellers, the mother of Peter Sellers, in the Golden Globe-winning film The Life and Death of Peter Sellers.

Margolyes was one of the original cast of the London production of the musical Wicked opposite Idina Menzel in 2006, playing Madame Morrible, a role she reprised on Broadway in 2008.

In 2009, she appeared in a new production of Endgame by Samuel Beckett at the Duchess Theatre in the West End.

Margolyes voiced Mrs Plithiver, a blind snake, in the 3D-animated-epic film Legend of the Guardians: The Owls of Ga'Hoole (2010).

In 2011, she recorded a narrative for the album The Devil's Brides by klezmer musician-ethnographer Yale Strom.

Margolyes played the recurring character Prudence Stanley in the Australian-based TV series Miss Fisher's Murder Mysteries from 2012 to 2015.

In 2014, she voiced Nana in the Disney Junior animated series Nina Needs to Go!

In January 2016, Margolyes appeared in The Real Marigold Hotel, a travel documentary in which a group of eight celebrities travelled to India to see whether retirement would be more rewarding there than in the UK. The series was reprised for two Christmas Specials, The Real Marigold On Tour, from Florida and Kyoto. She narrated the 2016 ITV documentary about Lady Colin Campbell entitled Lady C and the Castle.

In December 2017, Margolyes appeared in the second season of The Real Marigold On Tour to Chengdu and Havana. She appeared in the first episode of the third series, in which she travelled to St Petersburg with Bobby George, Sheila Ferguson and Stanley Johnson.

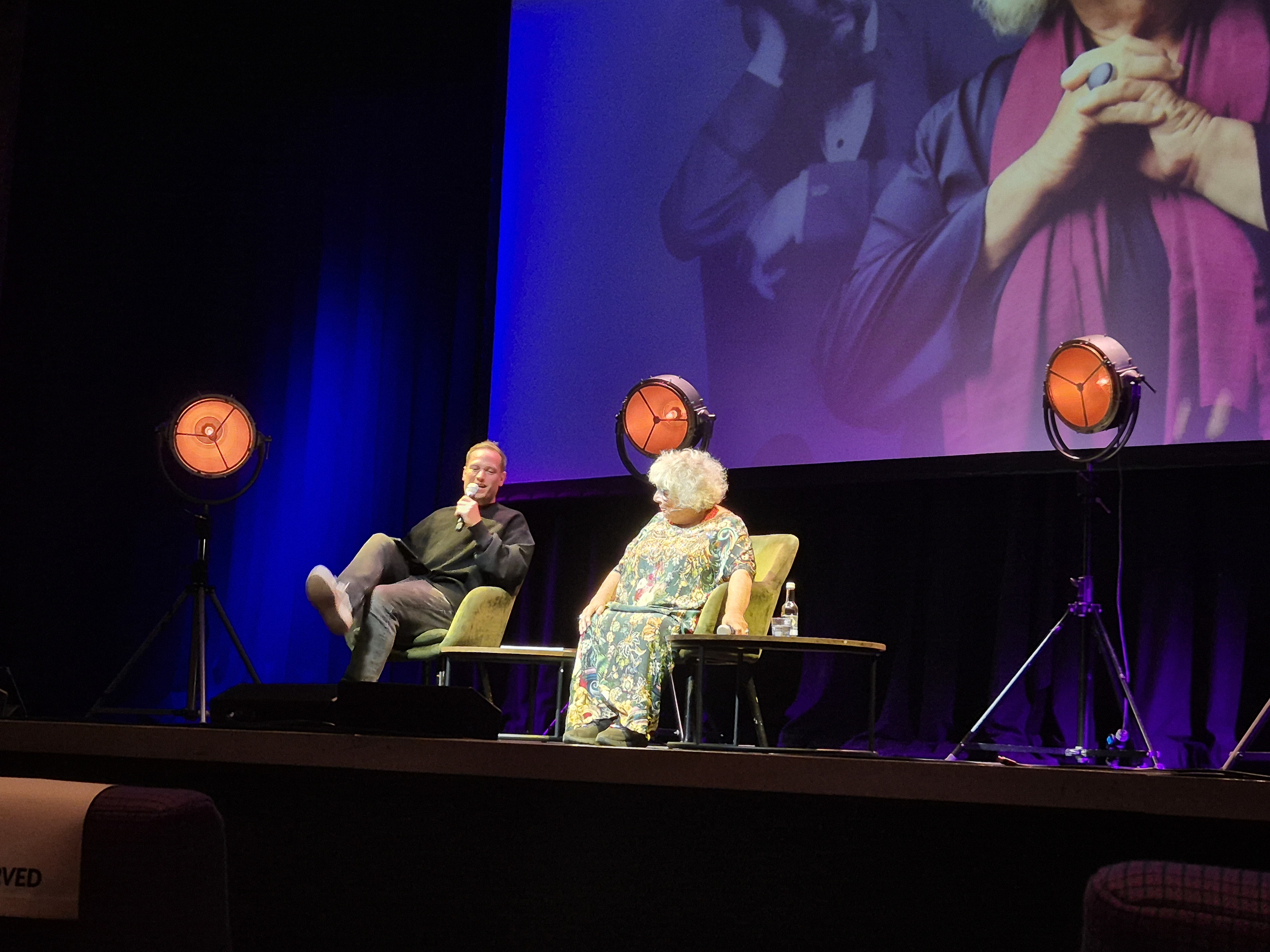
Margolyes in Edinburgh in August 2025 during the Q&A session after her show Margolyes and Dickens: More Best Bits

In January 2018, Margolyes hosted a three‑part BBC series titled Miriam's Big American Adventure, highlighting citizens of the United States and the issues facing the country. She voiced Queen Oofeefa in the film Early Man. Margolyes portrayed Mother Mildred in the BBC One drama Call the Midwife from 2018 until 2021.

She played Miss Shepherd in a 2019 production of The Lady in the Van for the Melbourne Theatre Company in Melbourne in Australia.

In October 2021, she played Lillian opposite Helen Monks in the BBC Radio 4 sitcom Charlotte and Lillian, where she introduced her autobiography This Much Is True. On 5 November, she appeared on BBC One's The Graham Norton Show, where she discussed the book, explaining that it was written only because she "was paid an enormous amount of money". On 16 September, the book was published by Hachette Books.

In April 2022, Margolyes was the subject of the BBC documentary Miriam Margolyes: Up for Grabs in the Imagine... series, where she was interviewed by Alan Yentob.

She appeared on BBC Radio 4's The Museum of Curiosity in February 2023. Her hypothetical donation to this imaginary museum was "Charles Dickens and all his works". In November 2023, Margolyes appeared as the voice of The Meep in "The Star Beast", the first of three Doctor Who 60th anniversary specials.

In 2025, she performed as a solo entertainer in her show Margolyes and Dickens: More Best Bits at the Edinburgh Festival Fringe. That same year, she starred in A Friend of Dorothy, which was nominated for Best Live Action Short Film at the 98th Academy Awards.

== Personal life ==
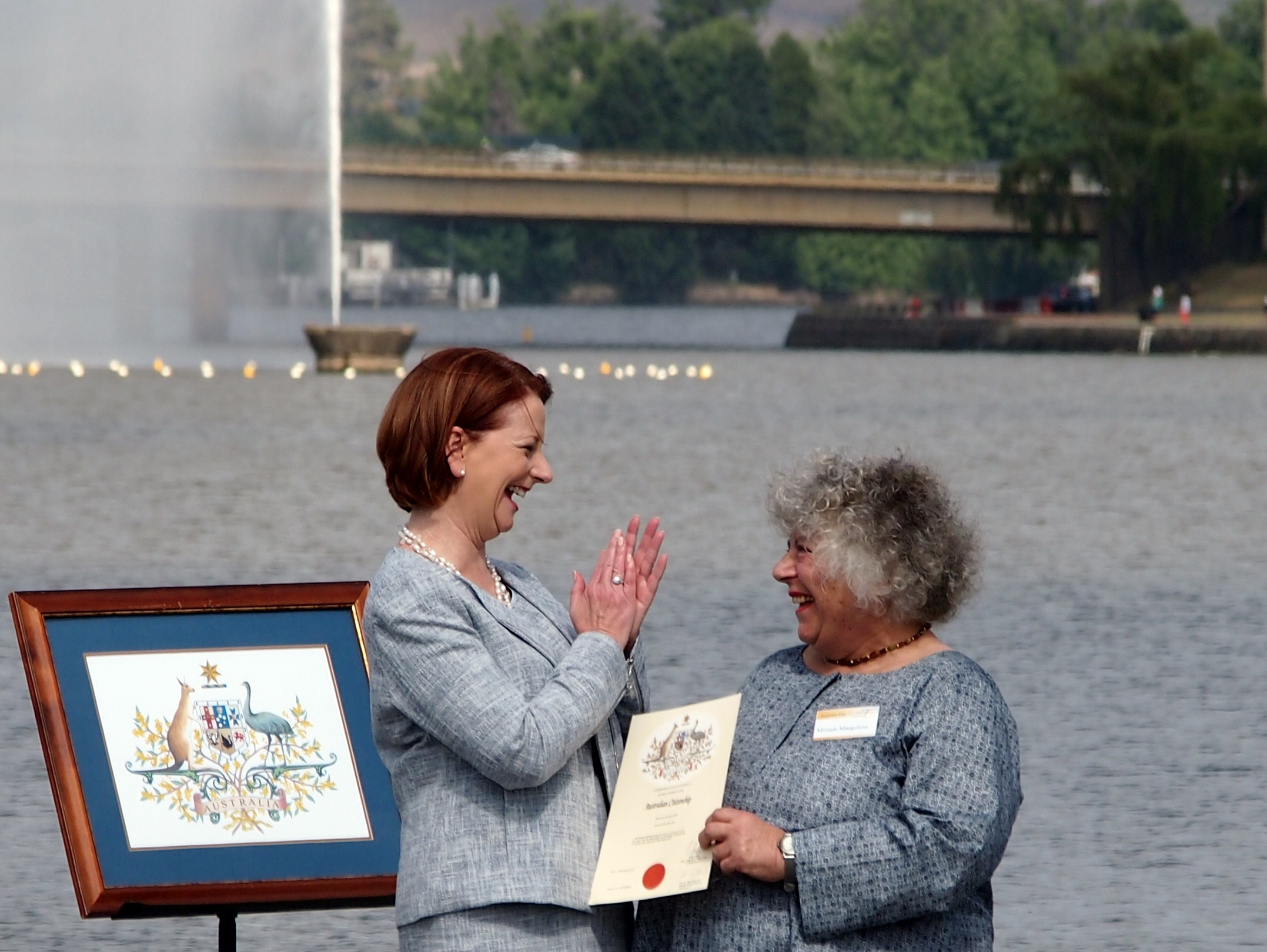
Margolyes shortly after being presented with her Australian citizenship certificate by Prime Minister Julia Gillard, 2013

Margolyes spent many years living for long periods in Australia, and became an Australian citizen on Australia Day 2013 while retaining her British citizenship.

She identifies as lesbian, and referred to herself as a "dyke" live on national television and in front of Australian prime minister Julia Gillard in 2013. Since 1968, she has been in a relationship with Heather Sutherland, an Australian retired professor of Indonesian studies. On 26 June 2013, Sutherland and Margolyes entered into a civil partnership. As of 2012, they were dividing their time between homes in London and Kent in England, Robertson, New South Wales in Australia, and Montisi in Italy. In November 2023, Margolyes revealed on The Graham Norton Show that she and Sutherland had never lived together but she wanted to do so as they were now both old and did not have much time left. She had been living in London and Sutherland had been living in Amsterdam for a while.

=== Health ===
Margolyes has spoken openly about several health challenges in later life. She has been diagnosed with spinal stenosis, a condition that causes narrowing of the spinal canal and affects mobility. As a result, she uses mobility aids, including walking sticks, a walker, and a mobility scooter, and is registered as disabled. She also suffers from osteoarthritis, which contributes to chronic pain in her legs, hands, and back, and has undergone knee replacement surgery on her left knee.

In May 2023, she underwent a transcatheter aortic valve implantation (TAVI), a minimally invasive heart procedure in which her aortic valve was replaced with one made from the tissue of a cow's heart.

In July 2025, Margolyes responded to renewed media speculation about her health, following earlier claims that she had said in an interview she was "probably going to die within the next five or six years, if not before". In a video message, she dismissed claims that she was "at death's door" as "bollocks", affirming she was "very much alive" and preparing to perform at the Edinburgh Fringe Festival.

In August 2025, during an interview with the Daily Mail's Weekend magazine, Margolyes expressed support for assisted dying, stating she would consider it if a stroke left her unable to speak, doubly incontinent or cognitively impaired.

=== Charities ===
Margolyes is a patron of My Death My Decision, a UK organisation that seeks to legalise medical assisted suicide if that is a person's persistent wish.

She is a supporter of Sense (the National Deafblind and Rubella Association), and was the host at the first Sense Creative Writing Awards, held at the Charles Dickens Museum in London in December 2006, where she read works written by deafblind people. She is also a campaigner for the respite care charity Crossroads.

=== Political views ===
Margolyes's political activism started at university. "I came from a very middle-class Jewish background, always Tory-voting", she later said. However, in the 1970s, she joined the Workers Revolutionary Party with other actors and Equity members, including Vanessa Redgrave, Frances de la Tour, and Tom Kempinski.

Margolyes is a member of the Labour Party and is registered to vote in Vauxhall. In August 2015, she was a signatory to a letter criticising The Jewish Chronicle's reporting of Labour leader Jeremy Corbyn's alleged associations with antisemites. In November 2019, she endorsed the Labour Party in the UK general election because of their policies on the National Health Service. Later in the month, along with other public figures, she signed a letter supporting Corbyn and describing him as a "beacon of hope in the struggle against emergent far-right nationalism, xenophobia, and racism in much of the democratic world".

Margolyes was very critical of the British Government's handling of the coronavirus pandemic. She considered it "a public scandal" and "a disgrace". With the Prime Minister hospitalised suffering from COVID-19, Margolyes said "I had difficulty not wanting Boris Johnson to die."

In her 2020 ABC series Almost Australian, Margoyles interviewed the Sistergirls of the Tiwi Islands, a transgender group of indigenous Australians. Margoyles can be seen telling the group "to be a woman you're gonna have to get rid of all that stuff [referring to facial hair] but I get whiskers on my chin and I have to pluck them out with tweezers because that's what women do," before being told by one of the indigenous members "you know, in our culture we respect that person regardless of the look. We don't look on the outside, it's the inside that you have to change." Margolyes responded "I apologise, now I understand."

In a 2022 interview with Radio Times, Margolyes questioned the usefulness of attacks on J. K. Rowling despite disagreeing with Rowling's stance on trans people, commenting that "There is a spectrum and people can be anywhere along that. There isn't one answer to all these trans questions". In November 2023, Margolyes said during another appearance on The Graham Norton Show that her position had changed after a discussion with Zoe Terakes, a trans Australian actor, and that she no longer believed that grammar was paramount over making someone happy by using their preferred pronouns.

On 15 October 2022, after being interviewed by Justin Webb about the recently deceased Robbie Coltrane on BBC Radio 4's Today, she commented to the presenters that she had never expected to be in a seat that had just been vacated by the Chancellor of the Exchequer, Jeremy Hunt. She said, live on air, "When I saw him there I just said, 'You've got a hell of a job, the best of luck', and what I really wanted to say was 'Fuck you, you bastard!'" She was herself shaken by the blunder, explaining to a researcher as she left the studio that she thought the mics were off at the time of the comment.

She is a signatory of Jews for Justice for Palestinians. Margolyes said, "What I want to try to do is to get Jewish people to understand what's really going on, and they don't want to hear it. If you speak to most Jews and say, 'Can Israel ever be in the wrong?' they say, 'No. Our duty as Jews is to support Israel whatever happens.' And I don't believe that. It is our duty as human beings to report the truth as we see it."

On 6 April 2024, a video by Margolyes was published by the Jewish Council of Australia (JCA) criticising the Israeli government for its ongoing invasion of the Gaza Strip and calling on Jews to "shout, beg, scream" for a ceasefire. In her 2.5 minute video she said:

... I have never been so ashamed of Israel as I am at this moment. To me, it seems as if Hitler has won. He's changed us Jews from being compassionate and caring and do unto others as you would have them do unto you into this vicious genocidal nationalist nation, pursuing and killing women and children. Of course, I condemn the Hamas action, of course I do. But what we are doing, Jewish people over in Israel, is shocking, embarrassing and wicked and I cannot understand why all Jewish people, particularly members of synagogues, do not want immediately to stop what is going on. And in the name of humanity, I call upon all Jews to shout, beg, scream for a ceasefire. ...

The Campaign Against Antisemitism described these comments as "repugnant" and "anti-Jewish venom". It said it would write to the Honours Forfeiture Committee and the British Academy of Film and Television Arts and urge them to revoke her honours. Jewish author and activist Andrew Feinstein said Margolyes is "a Jew who believes that ‘Never Again' applies to all humanity and speaks up about the reality that Israel does not represent us. She speaks truth to power in the best Jewish tradition". Margolyes said "I'm not antisemitic, I'm anti-killing children. I am criticising the Israeli government. But I am also criticising the Jewish people in the UK, the community that I belong to, which is not coming out in support of me. I just want people not to kill each other".

In June 2025 Margolyes again endorsed a JCA campaign over Palestinians facing starvation calling on the Australian Government to sanction Israel.

== Books ==
- Dickens' Women (2011) Co-authored with Sonia Fraser
- This Much is True (2021)
- Oh Miriam!: Stories from an Extraordinary Life (2023)
- The Little Book of Miriam (2025)
- Miriam's Full English: A Grand Tour of All Our Best Bits (2026)

== In popular culture ==
Author and comedian David Walliams says he used Margolyes as a model for the title character in his children's book Awful Auntie after an argument with her during a stage production, though he stressed that he has nothing against her and is a fan of her work.

== Filmography ==
=== Film ===
Year	Title	Role	Notes
1969	A Nice Girl Like Me	Pensione 'Mama'	
1974	On the Game	Narrator	Uncredited
1975	Rime of the Ancient Mariner	Dorothy Wordsworth	
1977	Stand Up, Virgin Soldiers	Elephant Ethel	
1977	Confessions from a Holiday Camp	Blackbird	Uncredited voice role
1977	The Battle of Billy's Pond	Tour Guide	
1978	On a Paving Stone Mounted	Performer	
1980	The Apple	Landlady	
1980	The Awakening	Dr Kadira	
1981	Reds	Woman writing in notebook	Uncredited role
1982	Crystal Gazing	Newsreader	
1983	Yentl	Sarah	
1983	Scrubbers	Jones	
1984	Electric Dreams	Ticket girl	
1985	The Good Father	Jane Powell	
1985	Morons from Outer Space	Doctor Wallace	
1986	Little Shop of Horrors	Dental Nurse	
1987	Body Contact	Mrs Zulu	
1988	Little Dorrit	Flora Finching	
1990	The Fool	Mrs Bowring	
1990	Pacific Heights	Rochelle	
1990	I Love You to Death	Mrs Soca	
1991	The Butcher's Wife	Gina	
1991	Dead Again	Lady	Uncredited role
1992	As You Like It	Audrey	
1993	The Age of Innocence	Mrs Mingott	
1993	Ed and His Dead Mother	Mabel Chilton	
1994	Immortal Beloved	Nanette Streicherová	
1995	Balto	Grandma Rosy	
1995	Babe	Fly	Voice role
1996	Different for Girls	Pamela	
1996	Romeo + Juliet	The Nurse	
1996	James and the Giant Peach	Aunt Sponge/Glowworm	Voice role
1998	Mulan	The Matchmaker	Voice role
1998	Babe: Pig in the City	Fly	Voice role; cameo
1998	The First Snow of Winter	Sean the duck	Voice role
1998	Left Luggage	Mrs Goldman	Voice role
1998	Candy	Gisella	
1999	Magnolia	Faye Barringer	Uncredited role
1999	End of Days	Mabel	
1999	Dreaming of Joseph Lees	Signora Caldoni	
1999	Sunshine	Rose Sonnenschein	
2000	House!	Beth	
2001	Not Afraid, Not Afraid	Performer	
2001	Cats & Dogs	Sophie the Castle Maid	
2002	Harry Potter and the Chamber of Secrets	Professor Pomona Sprout	
2002	Plots with a View	Thelma & Selma	
2002	Alone	Caseworker	
2004	Being Julia	Dolly de Vries	
2004	Ladies in Lavender	Dorcas	
2004	Modigliani	Gertrude Stein	
2004	End of the Line	Bag Lady	Short film
2004	Chasing Liberty	Maria	
2006	Flushed Away	Rita's Grandma	Voice role
2006	Happy Feet	Mrs Astrakhan	Voice role
2007	The Dukes	Aunt Vee	
2008	How to Lose Friends & Alienate People	Mrs Kowalski	
2009	A Closed Book	Mrs Kilbride	
2010	Legend of the Guardians: The Owls of Ga'Hoole	Mrs Plithiver	Voice role
2011	Harry Potter and the Deathly Hallows – Part 2	Professor Pomona Sprout	
2012	Sir Billi	Baroness Chantal McToff	Voice role
2012	The Wedding Video	Patricia	
2012	The Guilt Trip	Anita	
2014	The Legend of Longwood	Lady Thyrza	
2014	Maya the Bee	The Queen	Voice role
2017	The Little Vampire 3D	Wulftrud	Voice role
2017	The Man Who Invented Christmas	Mrs Fisk	
2018	Early Man	Queen Oofeefa	Voice role
2019	H Is for Happiness	Miss Bamford	
2020	Miss Fisher and the Crypt of Tears	Prudence Stanley	
2023	My Happy Ending	Judy	
2023	Pored tebe	Vera	
2025	A Friend of Dorothy	Dorothy	Short film
2026	Holy Days	Sister Luke	

=== Television ===
Year	Title	Role	Notes
1965	Theatre 625	Rita	Episode: "Enter Solly Gold"
1967	Crossroads	Mrs Perkins	3 episodes
1967	ITV Play of the Week	Heidi	Episode: "The English Climate"
1967	Boy Meets Girl	Maria	Episode: "Flight of the Kingfisher"
1968	Dixon of Dock Green	Anna	Episode: "An Ordinary Man"
1969	Thirty-Minute Theatre	Voice	Episode: "The Boat to Addis Ababa"
1969	ITV Playhouse	Kathie	Episode: "The Ha Ha"
1972	A Place in the Sun	Maid	Episode: "Achilles Heel"
1972	Jackanory Playhouse	The Witch	Episode: "The Wily Wizard and the Wicked Witch"
1972–73	Words and Pictures	Various Voices	20 episodes
1973	Doctor in Charge	Doris	Episode: "Men without Women"
1974	World of Laughter	Various parts	6 episodes
1974	Fall of Eagles	Anna Vyrubova	Episode: "Tell the King the Sky is Falling"
1975	The Girls of Slender Means	Jane Wright	3 episodes
1976	Christmas Box	Mrs Kaplan	Television film
1976	Angels	June Morris	2 episodes
1976	Kizzy	Mrs Doe	2 episodes
1976	The Glittering Prizes	Olive Wise	TV serial
1976	The Water Margin	Voice	English dub of Japanese series
1976, 1982	Crown Court	Marilyn Munro; Mrs King	2 episodes
1977	Play for Today	Veronica	Episode: "The Thin Edge of the Wedge"
1977	Spasms	Rose Finn	Television film
1978	Monkey	Voice	English dub of Japanese series Saiyûki; 52 episodes
1980	The Lost Tribe	Queenie	TV serial
1980	Tales of the Unexpected	Mary Burge	Episode: "Fat Chance"
1981	Take a Letter, Mr Jones	Maria	6 episodes
1981	A Kick Up the Eighties	Various roles	3 episodes
1981	The History Man	Melissa Tordoroff	3 episodes
1983	The Black Adder	Infanta Maria Escalosa of Spain	Episode: "The Queen of Spain's Beard"
1984	Freud	Baroness	TV serial
1985	Oliver Twist	Mrs Corney	TV serial
1985	Honour, Profit and Pleasure	Elephant and Castle	Television film
1986	The Life and Loves of a She-Devil	Nurse Hopkins	2 episodes
1986	Blackadder II	Lady Whiteadder	Episode: "Beer"
1986	A Little Princess	Miss Amelia	6 episodes
1986	Scotch and Wry	Various	Television film
1987	Poor Little Rich Girl: The Barbara Hutton Story	Elsa Maxwell	Television film
1988	Blackadder's Christmas Carol	Queen Victoria	Television Special
1988	Mr Majeika	Wilhelmina Worlock	2 episodes
1989	Murderers Among Us	Mrs Rajzman	Television film
1990	Orpheus Descending	Vee Talbot	Television film
1990	The Finding	Poll	Television film
1990	Screen Two	Nellie	Episode: "Old Flames"
1991	Tonight at 8.30	Mrs Wadhurst	2 episodes
1992	Stalin	Nadezhda Krupskaya	Television film
1992	Frannie's Turn	Frannie Escobar	6 episodes
1993	The Comic Strip Presents...	Mother	Episode: "Demonella"
1994	Just William	Miss Polliter	Episode: "William's Busy Day"
1994	Moonacre	Old Elspeth	6 episodes
1995	Cold Comfort Farm	Mrs Beetle	Television film
1997	The IMAX Nutcracker	Sugar Plum	Short film
1997	The Phoenix and the Carpet	Cook	BBC TV serial
1997	The Place of Lions	Miss Cole	Television film
1998	Vanity Fair	Miss Crawley	TV serial
1998	The First Snow of Winter	Sean McDuck	Voice; UK version
1998	Supply & Demand	Chief Superintendent Edna Colley	TV serial
1998, 2001	Rugrats	Shirley Finster	Voice; 3 episodes
2000	Dharma & Greg	Chloe	Episode: "Midwife Crisis"
2004	Agatha Christie's Marple	Mrs Price-Ridley	Episode: The Murder at the Vicarage
2004	The Life and Death of Peter Sellers	Peg Sellers	Television film, HBO
2005	Wallis & Edward	Bessie Merryman	Television film
2005	Inconceivable	Malva	Episode: "Balls in Your Court"
2006	Jam & Jerusalem	Mrs Midge	Season 2, Episode 6
2008	Kingdom	Henny	Episode 2.04
2009	The Sarah Jane Adventures	Leef Slitheen-Blathereen	Voice; 2 episodes
2010	Tinga Tinga Tales	Giraffe and Squirrel	Voice; Recurring Role
2010	Merlin	Grunhilda	Episode: "The Changeling"
2011	Doc Martin	Shirley	Episode: Born with a Shotgun
2012–15	Miss Fisher's Murder Mysteries	Prudence Elizabeth Stanley	12 episodes
2013	Hebburn	Millie	Christmas special
2014	Nina Needs to Go!	Nana Sheila	Voice; 15 episodes
2014	Trollied	Rose	Series 4
2016	Plebs	Iona	Episode: "The Cupid"
2016–17	Bottersnikes & Gumbles	Weathersnike	3 episodes
2016–18	Rake	Huntley-Brown	3 episodes
2017	Bucket	Mim	4 episodes
2017	Family Guy	Right Eyeball	Voice; Episode: "Emmy-Winning Episode"
2018–21	Call the Midwife	Sister Mildred/Mother Mildred	7 episodes
2019	101 Dalmatian Street	Bessie	Voice; Episode: "A Summer to Remember"
2020	The Windsors	Queen Victoria	Episode: #3.1
2021	Apple & Onion	Queen Victoria Sponge	Voice; Episode: "For Queen and Country"
2022	Dog Squad	Sylvie	Voice; 3 episodes
2023	Doctor Who	The Meep	Voice; episode: "The Star Beast"
2023	Hilda	Astrid	Voice; 4 episodes
2023	Mog's Christmas	Aunt	Voice

=== Non-fiction television ===
Year	Title	Role	Notes
2005	Dickens in America	Herself	10 episodes
2016	The Real Marigold Hotel	Herself	BBC documentary series
2018	Miriam's Big American Adventure	Herself	BBC documentary series
2019	Miriam's Dead Good Adventure	Herself	BBC documentary series
2020	Miriam's Big Fat Adventure	Herself	BBC documentary series
2020	Miriam Margolyes: Almost Australian	Herself	ABC documentary series
2021, 2022	Miriam and Alan: Lost in Scotland	Herself	C4 documentary series
2022	Miriam Margolyes: Up for Grabs	Herself	An Alan Yentob imagine... documentary for BBC
2022	Miriam Margolyes Australia Unmasked	Herself	ABC documentary series
2022	Miriam's Dickensian Christmas	Herself	C4 documentary
2023	Irish Road Trip with Miriam Margolyes	Herself	SBS documentary series
2023	Lady Gregory: Ireland's First Social Influencer	Herself	RTÉ documentary series
2024	Impossibly Australian	Herself	ABC documentary series
2024	Miriam Margolyes: A New Australian Adventure	Herself	BBC documentary series
2025	Miriam Margolyes Discovers New Zealand	Herself	BBC documentary series
2026	Miriam Margolyes Made Me Me	Herself	BBC documentary

Notes

- The Thief and the Cobbler (1993) – the voice of the Maiden from Mombasa (original version only; the character was not heard at all in the re-edited versions and another actor was never available in all the re-edited versions)
- The Life and Death of Peter Sellers (2004) – Peg Sellers – note this film was shown in cinemas in the UK, Ireland, and Australia – it aired on cable television on the HBO network in the US.

=== Theatre ===
Year	Title	Role	Venue
1970	Fiddler on the Roof	Matchmaker	UK Tour
1972	Threepenny Opera	Nelly	Piccadilly Theatre, London
1974	Canterbury Tales	Wife of Bath	Bristol Old Vic
1975	Kennedy's Children	Performer	Arts Theatre, London
1976	The White Devil	Zanche the Moor	Old Vic Theatre, London
1978	Cloud Nine	Performer	Joint Stock/Royal Court Tour
1979	Flaming Bodies	Psychiatrist	ICA
1984	84 Charing Cross Road	Helen Hanff	Colchester
1985–87	Gertrude Stein and a Companion	Gertrude Stein	Edinburgh Festival; Hampstead Theatre; Australian Tour
1986	Man Equals Man	Widow Begbick	Almeida Theatre, London
1988	Orpheus Descending	Vee Talbot	Theatre Royal Haymarket, London
1989–91	Dickens' Women	Performer	Edinburgh Festival; Hampstead Theatre; Duke of York's Theatre, London
1993	She Stoops to Conquer	Mrs Hardcastle	Queen's Theatre, London
1995	The Killing of Sister George	June "George" Buckridge	Ambassadors Theatre, London
1999	The Cherry Orchard	Madame Ranevskaya	Theatre Royal, York
2001	Romeo and Juliet	Nurse	Ahmanson Theater, Los Angeles
2001	The Vagina Monologues	Performer	Arts Theatre, London
2003	The Way of the World	Lady Wishfort	Sydney Theatre Company
2004	Blithe Spirit	Madame Arcati	Melbourne Theatre Company
2006	The Importance of Being Earnest	Miss Prism	Ahmanson Theater, Los Angeles; Brooklyn Academy of Music, New York
2006	Wicked	Madame Morrible	Apollo Victoria Theatre, London
2008	Wicked	Madame Morrible	George Gershwin Theater, New York
2009	Realism	Performer	Melbourne Theatre Company
2009	Endgame	Nell	Duchess Theatre, London
2010	Me and My Girl	The Duchess	Crucible Theatre, Sheffield
2011	A Day in the Death of Joe Egg	Grace	Citizens' Theatre, Glasgow
2012	Dickens' Women	Performer	World Tour
2014	Neighbourhood Watch	Ana	Adelaide State Theatre
2014	I'll Eat You Last	Sue Mengers	Melbourne Theatre Company
2015	The Importance of Being Miriam	Performer	Australian Tour (Note: Her May 2015 live performance in the Canberra Theatre, with John Martin on piano, was filmed and released on DVD by ABC Classics 076 2926 in 2015)
2017	Madame Rubinstein	Helena Rubinstein	Park Theatre, London
2019	The Lady in the Van	Miss Shepherd	Melbourne Theatre Company
2019	Sydney & The Old Girl	Nell Stock	Park Theatre, London
2024	White Rabbit Red Rabbit	Performer	@sohoplace, London
2025	Margolyes and Dickens: More Best Bits	Performer	Edinburgh Festival, Edinburgh International Conference Centre

=== Video games ===
Year	Title	Role	Notes
2021	Wallace & Gromit: The Big Fix Up	B.E.R.Y.L	
2023	Wallace & Gromit in The Grand Getaway	B.E.R.Y.L	

== Awards and nominations ==
Year	Award	Category	Nominated work	Result	Refs
1989	Los Angeles Drama Critics Circle	Supporting Actress	Little Dorrit	Won	
1991	Laurence Olivier Award	Best Actress in a Musical	Dickens' Women	Nominated	
1993	Sony Radio Award	Best Actress On Radio	The Queen and I	Won	
1994	British Academy Film Award	Best Supporting Actress	The Age of Innocence	Won	
1997	The Talkies Performer of the Year	—N/a	Oliver Twist	Won	
2001	Audiofile's Earphones Award	—N/a	A Christmas Carol	Won	
2007	Theatregoer's Choice Award	Best Supporting Actress in a Musical	Wicked	Won	
2010	Theatregoer's Choice Award	Best Supporting Actress in a Play	Endgame	Won	
2018	Audiofile's Earphones Award	—N/a	Bleak House	Won	

Margolyes was appointed Officer of the Order of the British Empire (OBE) in the 2002 New Year Honours for Services to Drama.
