= Ruth Sutherland =

Australian painter and art critic

- Born: 1884; Adelaide, Australia
- Died: 1948 (aged 63–64)
- Known for: Painting, Writing
- Movement: Impressionism

Ruth Sutherland (1884–1948), was an Australian painter and art critic. She was a founding member of the Twenty Melbourne Painters Society.

== Biography ==
Sutherland was born in Adelaide in 1884. She was granddaughter to notable sketcher George Sutherland and an engraver Jane Smith-Sutherland, who emigrated to Australia from Scotland with their family. She was a pupil of Gwen Barringer in South Australia before coming to Melbourne. She attended the National Gallery of Victoria Art School where she was taught by Lindsay Bernard Hall.

Sutherland wrote articles for the Melbourne newspaper 'The Age' and to the journal 'Art in Australia' about Max Meldrum and Hilda Rix Nicholas.

Sutherland was the niece of the painter Jane Sutherland and the sister of the composer Margaret Sutherland. She was also a cousin of Stella Bowen's. She was a member of the Twenty Melbourne Painters. She had a joint exhibition of oils, watercolours and pastels with fellow artists Dora Wilson and May Roxburgh in 1918. Sutherland had a history with Dora Wilson prior to later established artist societies, exhibiting as part of "The Waddy" in 1909, along with Janet Cumbrae Stewart and Norah Gurdon. She enjoyed doing landscapes, renting a cottage in Lilydale with Bernice Edwell and Florence Rodway to sketch the surrounding country. She also exhibited with the Yarra Sculptors' Society.

She died in 1948. A memorial exhibition of her work referred to her as "a quiet artist in a mode of painting now largely abandoned" and that her works were most sympathetic.

== Selected works ==
Watercolour paintings by Ruth Sutherland

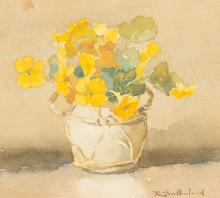
Still life, Private collection

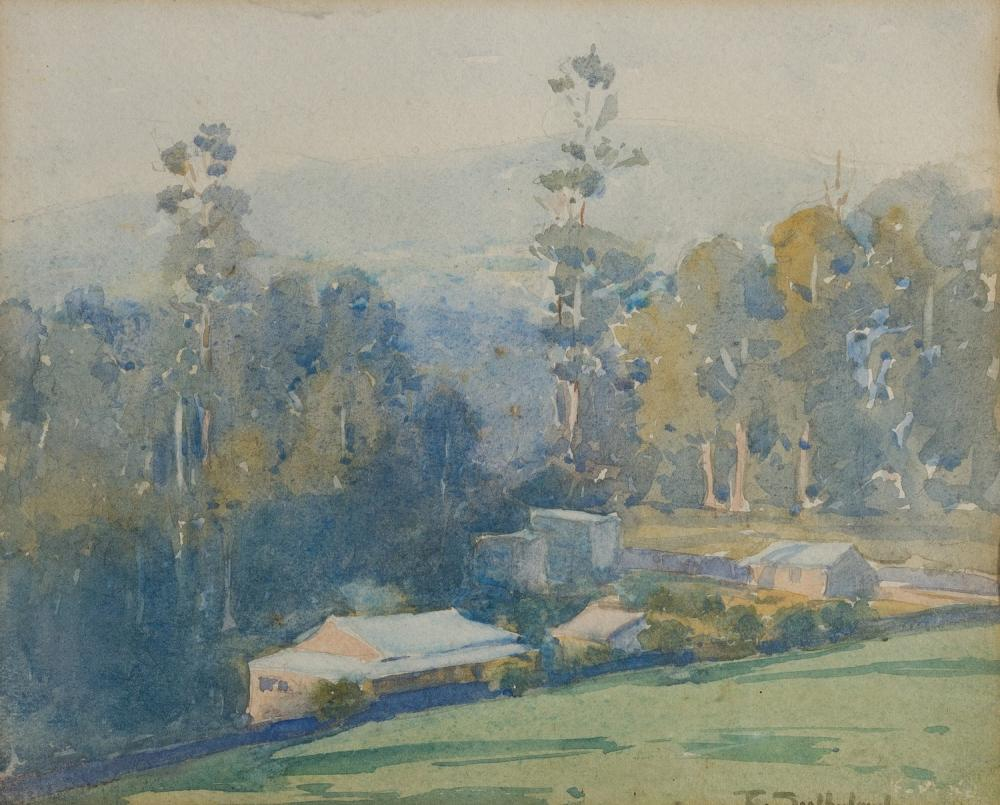
Homestead, Private collection

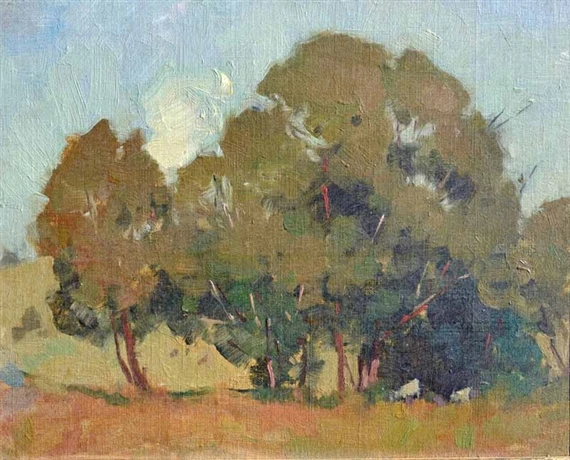
The Ruin & Trees, Private collection

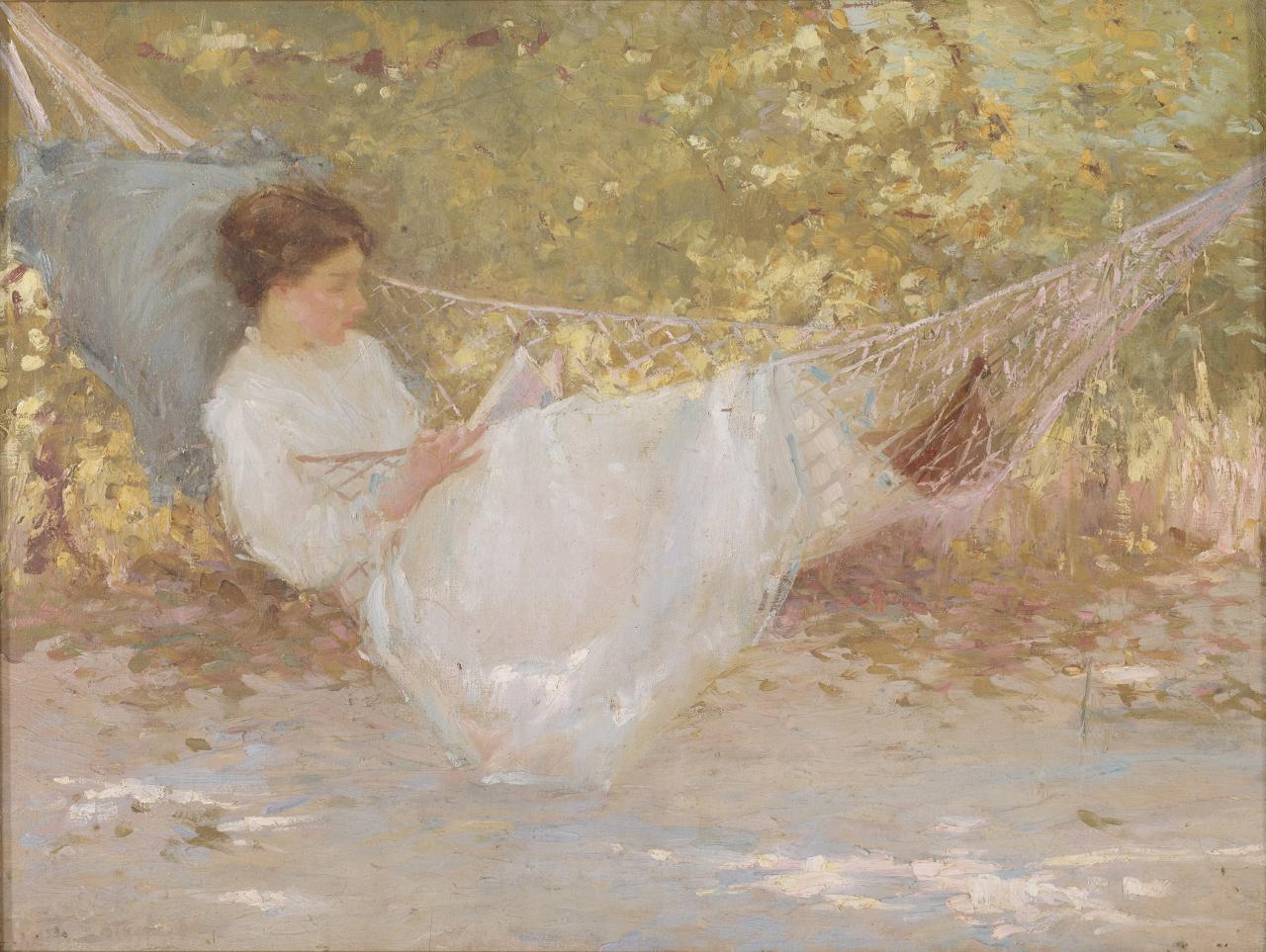
Girl in a hammock, National Gallery of Victoria

== Exhibitions ==
- 1909, "The Waddy" society of artists, Guild Hall
- 1909, Federal Art Exhibition, North terrace
- 1911, Yarra Sculptors Society, Athenaeum Hall
- 1912, "The Waddy" society (with Dora Taylor and Janet Cumbrae Stewart), Tuckett and Styles' Gallery
- 1912, Group exhibition (with Dora Wilson and Nora Gurdon), Tuckett and Styles' Gallery
- 1912 Victorian Artists Society autumn exhibition, Albert Street galleries
- 1913, Group exhibition, Athenaeum Hall
- 1914, Australian Art Association, Athenaeum Hall
- 1914, British History Tableaux (in aid of Red Cross), Victorian Artists Society
- 1914, Twelve Melbourne Painters Society second exhibition, Athenaeum Hall
- 1915, Victorian Artists Society twentieth annual exhibition
- 1916, Victorian Artists Society annual exhibition
- 1916, French Week appeal exhibition, Town Hall
- 1917, Australian Art Association fifth annual exhibition
- 1918, Group exhibition (with Dora Wilson and May Roxburgh), Fine Art Society
- 1919, French aid exhibition, Fine Art Galleries
- 1919, Twenty Melbourne Painters Society, Athenaeum Gallery
- 1919, Melbourne Society of Women Painters and Sculptors annual exhibition, Victoria Markets
- 1920, Twenty Melbourne Painters Society, Athenaeum Hall
- 1940, Melbourne Society of Women Painters and Sculptors annual exhibition, Athenaeum Gallery
- 1941, Melbourne Society of Women Painters and Sculptors annual exhibition, Athenaeum Gallery
- 1950, Memorial exhibition for Ruth Sutherland, Melbourne Book Club Gallery
