= Anne Bryson Sutherland =

Scottish surgeon (1922–2011)

Anne Bryson Sutherland FRCS
- Born: 7 January 1922; Wellford, Broxburn, Scotland
- Died: 27 March 2011 (aged 89); Edinburgh, Scotland
- Education: University of Edinburgh
- Medical career
- Field: plastic surgery
- Institutions: Bangour Hospital; Royal Hospital for Sick Children, Edinburgh; Royal College of Surgeons of Edinburgh
- Sub-specialties: plastic surgery of burn victims

Anne Bryson Sutherland (7 January 1922 – 27 March 2011) was a Scottish plastic surgeon specializing in the care of burn victims. Sutherland was the first woman to be appointed a consultant plastic surgeon, the first woman Chairperson of the British Burn Association and the first woman President of the British Association of Plastic Surgeons.

== Early life and education ==
Anne Sutherland was born in Wellford, Broxburn, West Lothian. She was the only child of David Murdoch Sutherland and his wife Margaret Bryson. She attended Bathgate Academy and St Hilda's School, Liberton, Edinburgh. On leaving school, she had wanted to study medicine, but due to the opposition of her father who thought it an unsuitable career for a woman, she instead attended the Edinburgh College of Domestic Science, and went on to train as a dietician. Four years after her father's death, she began a degree in pure science at the University of Glasgow, but left after a year when she obtained a place on the MB ChB course at the University of Edinburgh, from which she graduated in 1951.

== Career ==
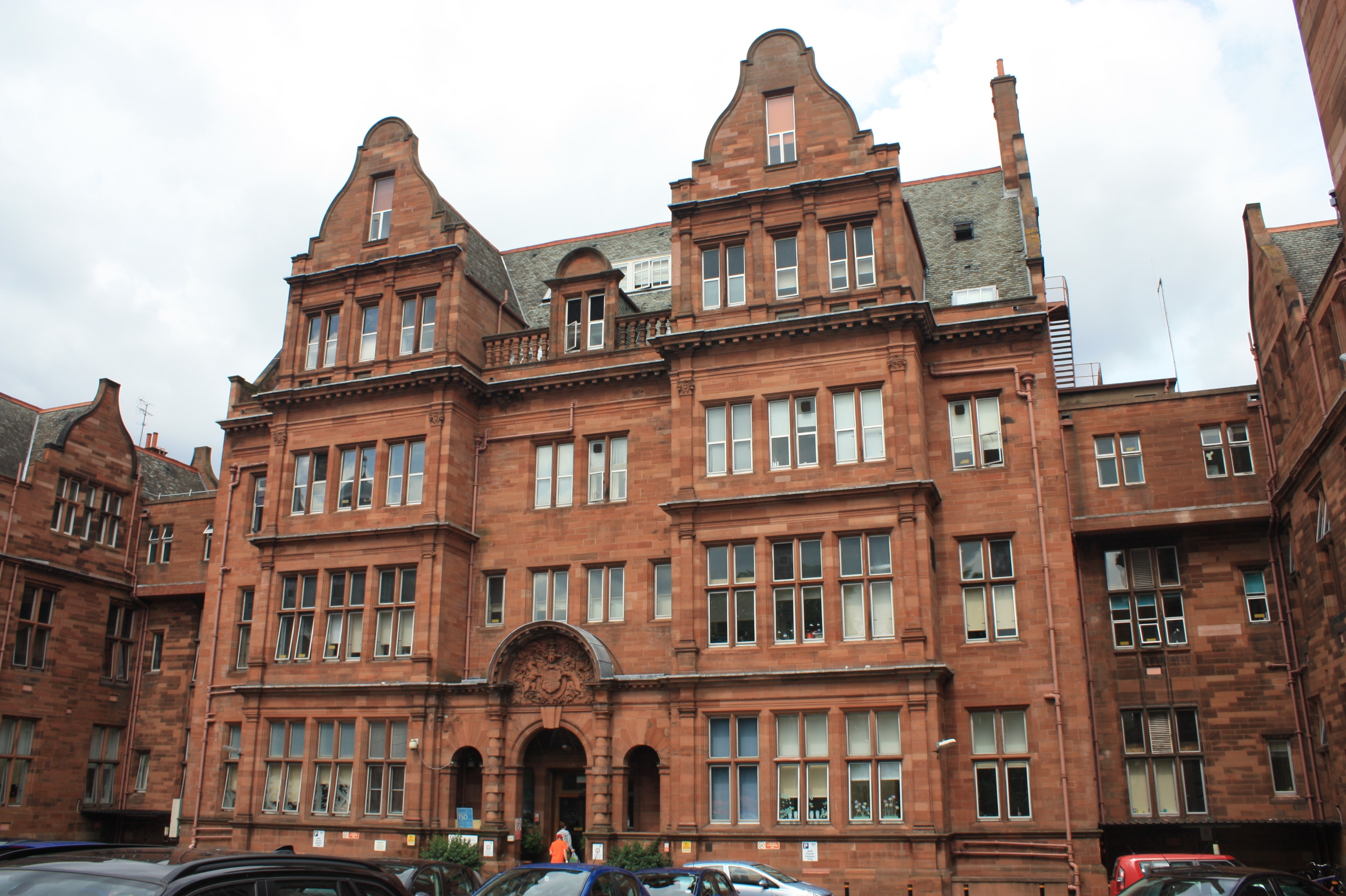
Royal Hospital for Sick Children, where Sutherland was employed.

During her time as a junior hospital doctor, she became interested in plastic surgery, in particular in the effect of nutrition on the recovery of burned patients. She spent much of her career working at Bangour Hospital and the Royal Hospital for Sick Children in Edinburgh under Mr A.B. Wallace, who made many advances in the care of burns, and in 1956–57 spent a year in the American Army Burns Institute in San Antonio, Texas, US, where she worked on the treatment of burns sustained by men serving in the US Forces. On her return to Edinburgh she gained her MD in 1958 with a thesis on: "Thermal Injury: its effect on nutrition, with special reference to bodyweight and food intake".

In 1963, she passed the examinations to become a Fellow of the Royal College of Surgeons of Edinburgh. Sutherland was the first woman to be appointed a consultant plastic surgeon, the first woman Chairperson of the British Burn Association and in 1987 became the first woman President of the British Association of Plastic Surgeons. She was also President of the European Burns Association and also active in the International Society for Burn Injuries.

== Later life ==
Following retirement, Sutherland was awarded long service badges as a volunteer in the National Trust for Scotland's properties at Gladstone's Land and 28 Charlotte Square. At the age of 76 she embarked on a French course with the Open University, which led her on to studying several more courses for the sake of interest, and in 2004 found she had unintentionally achieved a Bachelor of Arts degree at the age of 82.
