= Delgany, Portsea =

Heritage-listed house in Melbourne, Victoria, Australia

Delgany
- Location of the house in Greater Metropolitan Melbourne
- Interactive map of the Delgany area
- Alternative names: Delgany Castle; Delgany Portsea
- Etymology: Delgany, County Wicklow, Ireland

General information
- Status: Completed
- Type: House (1927–1947); School for the deaf (1947–c. 1980s); Luxury hotel (1988–c. 2003); Luxury residential estate (since 2008)
- Architectural style: Eclectic
- Location: 3809–3819 Point Nepean Road, Portsea, Mornington Peninsula, Melbourne, Victoria, Australia
- Coordinates: 38°19′21″S 144°42′33″E
- Year built: 1923–1925
- Completed: 1925; 101 years ago
- Renovated: 1953; 1968; 2007
- Client: Harold, Laura, and Leila Armytage

Technical details
- Material: Mount Gambier limestone; reinforced concrete; concrete bricks
- Grounds: 3.5 ha (8.6 acres)

Design and construction
- Architect: Harold Desbrowe-Annear

Renovating team
- Renovating firm: McGauran Giannini Soon (2007)
- Other designers: Stephen Akehurst (2007); Allom Lovell (2007); John Patrick (2007); Tract Consultants (2007)

Website
- delganyportsea.com.au (as a residential estate)

Victorian Heritage Register
- Official name: Delgany
- Type: Registered place
- Designated: 11 March 2004
- Reference no.: H2058
- Heritage overlay no.: HO207
- Categories: Residential buildings (private); Education

Register of the National Estate
- Official name: Delgany Castle
- Type: Defunct register
- Designated: undated
- Reference no.: 103011

Delgany, also known as Delgany Castle, is a former house, now luxury residential estate, known as Delgany Portsea, located at 3809–3819 Point Nepean Road in Portsea, on the Mornington Peninsula, in the south eastern suburbs of Melbourne, in Victoria, Australia.

Built in 1925 on the traditional lands of the Bunurong people, the house was added to the Victorian Heritage Register on 11 March 2004 in recognition of its historical and architectural significance; and was also added to non-statutory lists by the Victorian branch of the National Trust in November 1993 and the now defunct Register of the National Estate on an unknown date.

== History ==
Some of Melbourne's established families constructed many large country houses on the Mornington Peninsula as semi-rural retreats. Delgany in its prominent location, was intended to be one of the grandest of these.

=== à Becket family ===
The land on the Delgany property was first alienated in 1872 in a package of 27 hectares (67 acres) by Henry Morgan Murphy. Jurist Sir Thomas à Beckett purchased a section of Murphy's holding and built the first house known as Delgany, prior to 1821. This name was derived from Delgany, a small village in County Wicklow, Ireland. The house was described as 'low-spreading', 'a snug house, sweetly attractive'.

=== Armytage family ===
George Armytage, an engineer from Ticknall, Derbyshire, England, arrived in colonial Sydney in 1815 and moved to Van Diemen's Land the following year. In 1817, he established a 202-hectare (500-acre) pastoral run at Bagdad, that he doubled in ensuing years, grazing sheep. He also established pastoral runs in the Western District of colonial Victoria, centred on Geelong. Two of his seven sons were Charles Henry and Frederick William, who further developed the family's land holdings in Victoria, New South Wales, Queensland and Van Diemen's Land; and they became pioneers in the development of the frozen meat export industry in the colonies. In 1863, Charles and his wife, Caroline, purchased Como, for £18,000, set on 22 hectares (54 acres) on the south bank of the Yarra River in Melbourne, where they raised ten children.

The Armytage family took summer holiday breaks on the Mornington Peninsula from at least the early 1920s.

In c. 1923, three of Charles and Caroline's children – Harold Augustus, Laura and Leila – purchased land in Portsea and consulted with Harold Desbrowe-Annear, a well-known Melbourne architect, to assist with their plans. The Armytage family built the original house of Delgany in 1925; with additions made by subsequent owners in 1953 and 1968. Nine months after Delgany was completed, Harold, who was unmarried, died at the Mount Sturgeon Homestead, one of the Armytage family properties. Delgany passed to his sisters who remained at Delgany until the early 1940s.

Harold Armytage was attributed with the following description of Delgany in 1927:

"I am Delgany — The Castle on the Hill — the most beautiful spot on the most favoured Peninsula in Australia. Here, the hot north winds of summer are tempered to coolness as they cross the bay. Within half an hour of sunset a southern breeze invariably blows and soothes all night till dawn. In winter months the average temperature is ten degrees warmer than in Melbourne and in summer fifteen degrees cooler. This is indeed a blessed spot."

— Harold Armytage, 1927 (attrib.)

In the same year, in the March edition of The Australian Home Beautiful, Delgany was featured as "…the most imposing residence on Port Phillip Bay…".

In addition to Delgany and Como – the latter purchased by the Victorian branch of the National Trust in 1959 – other houses, estates, and properties established or owned by the Armytage family include the initial cottage at Bagdad, The Hermitage – now part of the Geelong Grammar School – other similar homesteads near Geelong (Elcho, Wooloomanata, and Windermere), the bluestone Ingleby Homestead, near Winchelsea and other similar homesteads nearby (Wormbete and Turkeith), Mount Sturgeon Homestead on the Wannon River, Fulham Homestead, and Congbool (Note: Sometimes spelled as Kongbool.) on the Glenelg River.

Requisitioned from the Misses Armytage by the Australian Government during World War II for use by the Australian Red Cross, Delgany was used as the 62 Australian Camp Hospital (62 ACH), (Note: The Victorian Heritage Register, the (defunct) Register for the National Estate, and Virtual War Memorial Australia state that Delgany was 62 ACH; yet the Australian War Memorial image collection states that Delgany was 58 ACH.) a convalescent hospital for the Royal Australian Army Medical Corps (RAAMC), from 1942 to 1946, later converted to the Heidelberg Repatriation Hospital while still in the ownership of the Armytage sisters.

=== Subsequent ownership ===
School for the deaf

In 1947 Delgany was sold to the Dominican Sisters who converted the house to St Mary’s School for the Deaf (Note: Other recorded names for the school were Portsea School for Deaf Children and St Mary's Home for the Deaf and Dumb.) with on-site dormitory facilities. The school for the deaf opened on February 1948 with 38 students and catered for boys aged 3-10 and girls aged 3-16, all of whom had hearing difficulties. In 1985, St Mary’s school relocated to Wantirna South and was renamed St Mary's School for Children with Impaired Hearing, and continues to operate as St Mary's College for the Deaf for primary and secondary school students, owned and operated by the Archdiocese of Melbourne. The Dominican Sisters sold Delgany in 1985; and during their occupancy, they made several alterations to Delgany, including the additions of two new wings that were completed in 1953 and 1968 in sympathetic limestone construction, to the south west of the main house. Other alterations include the conversion of the drawing room to a chapel and kitchen; and the garage into classrooms. Whilst Delgany never fell into disrepair, after the Sisters' occupancy, it was in need of work.

Luxury hotel and restaurant

Following further internal development, it opened in 1988 as the Delgany Country House Hotel, a Peppers luxury country retreat and restaurant. In 1990, Delgany was again listed for sale as a hotel/restaurant going concern, with expectations of A$10 to $15 million.

Luxury residential estate

In August 2004, the luxury hotel site was sold for A$10 million to a syndicate, led by GRC Buxton, who aimed to redevelop Delgany into a luxury housing and apartment complex. McGauran Giannini Soon were appointed as architects and the redevelopment was completed in 2007. The 3.5-hectare (9-acre) estate, including the Delgany house and adjacent grounds, was subdivided into 33 lots for redevelopment of luxury houses and apartments – 18 of which were within the old castle of Delgany, nine luxury two-storey townhouses and six detached larger homes within the grounds, ranging in size from 120 to 300 square metres (1,300 to 3,200 sq ft). Most of the apartments were sold between 2006 and 2008, prior to completion. The developer sold the remaining units during 2010. The development includes an underground carpark, gymnasium, and in-ground swimming pool facilities. Known listings on Armytage Drive include:

#	Description	Within house	Area		Listed price (million)	Year listed	Notes
#	Description	Within house	m2	sqft	Listed price (million)	Year listed	Notes
1	A castellated two-storey three-bedroom apartment	Yes	325	3,500	$3.9–$4.25	2020	
4	Single-storey, three-bedroom apartment	Yes			$2–2.2	2023	
8	Single-storey, three-bedroom apartment	Yes			$3.6–$3.96	2021	
11	Single storey, three-bedroom apartment	Yes	214	2,300	$1.29	2010	
14	Single storey, three-bedroom apartment	Yes	288	3,100	$1.65–$1.75	2020	
18	Three-bedroom apartment with large terrace	Yes	176	1,890	$1.15	2010	
20	Two-storey, three-bedroom unit with terrace	No	253	2,720	$1.4	2010	

== Description ==
Delgany is a large limestone building with prominent castellated parapets and towers incorporating an eclectic mix of Gothic and Medieval elements, designed by Desbrowe-Annear who was strongly influenced by the design philosophy of John Ruskin and the Arts and Crafts movement. Many of Desbrowe-Annear's works in South Yarra and Toorak demonstrate his interest in North American vernacular architecture and Spanish Mission Revival styles. Delgany is set in an expansive and largely informal landscaped setting.

The main building complex is situated in an elevated position at the south end of the property with panoramic views over the surrounding landscape and coastal area. The entrance to the site is off the Nepean Highway (also known as Point Nepean Road) where a serpentine drive leads to the building through a treed landscape. Originally the main entrance was a little further to the west; however, this was moved in the mid-1950s to its current location. To facilitate this change a new section of driveway and the tear drop shaped turning circle were also built. The tear shaped turning circle replaced the original driveway layout, which with the garage formed an integral unit, as the garage was designed for the drive to pass through it. It is unclear where the current gates and gate post came from but is thought that they may have been the gates to a large house built on the site during the 1880s by Sir Thomas à Beckett.

It was originally intended to build Delgany in local limestone, but scarce resources eventuated in Mount Gambier limestone being used. The à Beckett house was demolished by Armytage in the process of redevelopment, and some of limestone from the original building was incorporated into the garage and possibly parts of the main house

The exterior of the 1925 building is an eclectic mix of elements including Tudor castellation, an Italianate loggia with terrace, Voysean buttresses and a tower. This eclecticism is augmented by the addition a number of Annear's signature details including sliding sash windows recessed into the wall space and a distinct chimney design. The external walls are unusually thick, with 17-centimetre (6.7 in) deep limestone at the exterior, with approximately 10 centimetres (3.9 in) in reinforced concrete in the centre, with 17-centimetre (6.7 in) thick concrete bricks for the internal walls. The 1953 and 1968 wings are faced in limestone and match the castellated style of the original structure. While not of any particular architectural merit in themselves, the later components come together with the original building to form a largely coherent whole. The main entrance is now located to the side and rear of the older building, where it joins one of the later wing additions. The verandah has been enclosed with Neo-Georgian style arched windows, creating one of the dining rooms.

The interiors of all sections of the main building have been altered, although the 1925 wing retains some of its original plan form and principal spaces. The renovations have involved the conversion of many of the nuns offices on the ground floor, and quarters on the upper levels. Most of the ceilings have been lowered to accommodate serVices and there are new wall and floor surfaces. The dumb waiter is still intact, as is the original main staircase. The fireplace surrounds are copies, reduced somewhat in size.

The 1925 garage is a key element of the original Desbrowe Annear design, and retains a formal relationship to the main house. The former garage, which is believed to be constructed of local limestone, rather than the Mount Gambier (Note: Sometimes incorrectly referred to as "Geelong" limestone in sources.) limestone of the main house, has been converted to a special function room. During the reconstruction of the interior in the late 1980s, seaweed was also discovered as a form of insulation in the walls.

The Delgany landscape also provided a largely informal and naturalistic setting for the buildings, with a park-like surrounds featuring numerous Moonah interplanted with scattered pines and conifers. The immediate setting for the hotel, however, which was established after 1988, is considered to be uncharacteristically formal and ornamental.

== See also ==
- Architecture of Melbourne
- Eclecticism in architecture
- List of places on the Victorian Heritage Register in the Shire of Mornington Peninsula
