= List of historic homesteads in Australia =

This is a list of historic houses or notable homesteads located in Australia. The list has been sourced from a variety of national, state and local historical sources including those listed on the Australian Heritage Database, on the various heritage registers of the States and territories of Australia, or by the National Trust of Australia.

== Australian Capital Territory ==
Name	Address	Style	Date	Source	Notes	Image
Duntroon, Campbell family homestead	Duntroon	Gothic Revival	1833–1850s	GHA		Duntroon Homestead in the 1800s.
Lanyon Homestead	Tharwa	Mid-Victorian	1859–1908	GHA		Lanyon Homestead, in 2015

== New South Wales ==
name	Address	Style	Date	Heritage register(s)	Source	Notes	Image
Addington House	813 Victoria Road, Ryde	Colonial	1794				
Ahimsa	67 Cobran Road, Cheltenham	Meditative Bushland			NTA		
Balala Station	Uralla	Colonial	1840		HHA		
Bedervale and contents	Monkitee Street, Braidwood	Colonial	1845		HHA		
Belltrees	Gundy Road, Scone	Federation Filligree	1907		CEA		
Bookanan	West Guyong Road, Byng	Late Georgian	1839		ACH		
Booloominbah	60 Madgwick Drive, Armidale	Queen Anne	1888		GHA		Booloominbah, in 2009.
Boree Cabonne	Parkes Road, Boree via Cudal	Late Victorian	1897		ACH		
Broughton	3 Bungonia Road, Goulburn	Gothic Revival	1878		GHA		
Brownlow Hill	Orangeville, Cobbitty	Early Victorian	1828		HHA		
Historic Burnima Estate	Bombala	Late Victorian gothic	1896				
Burrawang West Station	Mulguthrie-Ootha	Modern Colonial	1860s–1907–1990s		ACHU; CEA		
Burrundulla	Mudgee	Mid-Victorian	1864		HHA		
Burrungurroolong	Goulburn	Mid-Victorian	1870		ACH		
Camden Park House	Camden Park, Menangle	Georgian Palladian	1834		HHA		Camden Park House, in 2006.
Colly Creek	Willow Tree Inn, New England Highway, Willow Tree	Federation Bungalow	c. 1920s		ACHU		
Cooma Cottage	756 Yass Valley Way, Marchmont, Yass	Colonial	1830s	NSW SHR: 01496	NTA		Cooma Cottage, in 2004.
Curry Flat Homestead and Garden	Nimmitabel, Monaro	Federation Filigree; Claude Crowe	1907				
Dairy Cottage	Parramatta Park, Parramatta	Colonial	1798				
Dalwood House	Wyndham Estate, Branxton	Georgian, Greek Revival	1829		NTA		Dalwood House, in 2001.
Denbigh	421 The Northern Road, Cobbitty	Colonial	1817–27		HHA		
Dundullimal Homestead	23L Obley Road, Dubbo	Vernacular Colonial	c. 1840s		NTA		
Durham Hall	207 Albion Street, Surry Hills	Late Georgian	c. 1830s		ACH		Durham Hall, in 2010.
Dyraaba	Dyraaba via Casino	Colonial	1842		HHA2		
Edinglassie	710 Denman Road, Muswellbrook	Italianate	c. 1880 and c. 1895	NSW SHR: 00170			
Elizabeth Bay House	Elizabeth Bay	Colonial	1835–38	NSW SHR: 00006	GHA		Elizabeth Bay House, in 2010.
Elizabeth Farm	Rosehill	Colonial	1793		HHA		Elizabeth Farm, c. 1920s.
Everglades Gardens	37-49 Everglades Avenue, Leura	Inter-War	c. 1930s		NTA		Everglades Gardens, in 2016.
Experiment Farm Cottage	Harris Park	Colonial	c. 1790s		NTA		Experiment Farm Cottage, in 2013.
Frankfield	Gunning	Mid-Victorian	1870		ACH		
Garrooigang Historic Home	Goulburn	Colonial	c. 1850s		ACHU		
Gidleigh Station	Bungendore	Mid-Victorian	1840		HHA2		
Glenlee Homestead	Menangle Road, Campbelltown	Georgian	1824		ACHU		
Glenrock	7932 The Snowy River Way, Jindabyne	Victorian Vernacular	c. early 1840s		HHA2		
Grossmann House	55 Cumberland Street, East Maitland	Mid-Victorian	1860–62		NTA		
Hadley Park	Penrith	Early Colonial	1812		NTA		Hadley Park, Castlereagh, NSW.
Harrington Park Homestead	Harrington Park	Colonial	1817				
Harper's Mansion	Berrima	Georgian	1834		NTA		Harper's Mansion, in 2009.
Hartwood	Riverina	Early Victorian	1850s–1907		ACH		
Havilah	Lue, near Mudgee	Late Victorian	1875		GHA; HHA		
Hazeldean	1410 Maffra Road, Cooma	Inter-War, Leslie Wilkinson	1895				
Hopewood	Wallacia	Edwardian Garden	1884		CEA		
Iandra Castle	870 Iandra Road, Greenethorpe	Federation Queen Anne	1908		ACHU		Iandra Castle, near Greenethorpe
Joyce Farmhouse	15 Valerie Avenue, Baulkham Hills	Colonial	1794, rebuilt after fire in 1804				
Kelvin	30 The Retreat, Bringelly	Georgian	1820		HHA		
Kennerton Green	Bong Bong Road, Mittagong	Old Colonial, Edwardian Garden			CEA		
Markdale Station and Garden	Binda, near Crookwell	Colonial	c. 1850s		ACHU		The homestead at Markdale, in 2013.
Maryland & Garden	773 The Northern Road, Bringelly	Colonial	1840		HHA2		
Mona Homestead and Garden	140 Little River Road, (Mongarlowe Rd), Braidwood	Victorian	c. 1850s		ACHU		
Mount Airlie Homestead and Garden	Woodstock Road, Milton	Mid Victorian	c. 1868				
Maryville, later Springwood, and Landscaped Garden now known as the Norman Lindsay Gallery	14-20 Norman Lindsay Crescent, Faulconbridge	Vernacular	c. 1900s		NTA		Norman Lindsay Gallery, in 2001.
Old Government House	Parramatta Park, Parramatta	Colonial	1799–1818	WHS: 1306; ANHL: 105957; NSW SHR: 00596	NTA		Old Government House, Parramatta. in 2012.
Oldbury Farm	Moss Vale	Georgian	1828		HHA		
Perricoota	Perricoota State Forest Road, Moama	Mid-Victorian	c. 1860s		ACH		
Pomeroy	2217 Range Road, Goulburn	Gothic	1842		ACH		
Retford Park	Bowral	Late Victorian Italianate	1887		GHA		
Riversdale	Maude Street, Goulburn	Old Colonial Regency	1837	NSW SHR: 01504	GHA; NTA		Riversdale, in 2006.
Rouse Hill House	356 Annangrove Road, Rouse Hill	Georgian	1822		HHA		
Saumarez Homestead	230 Saumarez Road, Armidale	Federation Edwardian	1888–1906	NSW SHR: 01505	NTA		Saumarez Homestead, in 2014.
Sefton Hall	Church Lane, Mount Wilson	Queen Anne Federation	1910–1912	NSW SHR: MW019			
Shirley Retreat and Garden	Holts Flat	Federation Bungalow; Paul Bangay-designed garden	1908		ACHU		
Springfield Station	Goulburn Plains	Early Victorian	1858		ACH		
St Aubins	St Aubins Road, Scone	Victorian with Dutch gables	1887–90		HHA2		
The Springs	Obley Road, Little River, Dubbo	Old Colonial	1858		HHA2; ACH		
The Hermitage	340 Old Northern Road, Castle Hill	Colonial	1802				
Tanilba House	32 Caswell Crescent, Tanilba Bay	Colonial Homestead	1831	NSW SHR:0029			
Titanga	141 Lismore-Skipton Road, Lismore	Victorian Italianate	1872		HHA		
Tocal Homestead	Tocal Road, Tocal, Paterson	Colonial	1839		HHA		
Tomago House	421 Tomago Road, Tomago	Colonial, Mid-Victorian	1840		NTA		
Wynstay	Mount Wilson	Inter-War	1923		GHA		
Yanga	Riverina	Mid-Victorian	1870		ACH		

== Northern Territory ==
Name	Address	Style	Date	Source	Notes	Image
Audit House, now The Giese Residence and Garden	Larrakeyah	Edwardian Queenslander	1934	NTA		Audit House at Myilly Point
Burnett House and Garden	Larrakeyah	Edwardian Queenslander	1938	NTA		Burnett House at Myilly Point
Government House and Garden	29 Esplanade, Darwin City	Late Victorian	1879	GHA		Government House, Darwin.
Magistrates House	Larrakeyah	Edwardian Queenslander	1940	NTA		
Mines House and Garden	Larrakeyah	Edwardian Queenslander	c. late 1930s	NTA		Mines House at Myilly Point.
O'Keeffe Residence	Riverbank Drive, Katherine	Vernacular	1924	NTA		
The Roadmaster's House	1 McMinn Street, Darwin City	Edwardian Queenslander	c. late 1930s	NTA		

== Queensland ==
Name	Address	Style	Date	Source	Notes	Image
Bimbah	Muttaburra Road, Longreach	Federation	1898	HHA2; ACH		
Canning Downs	Junabee Road, Warwick	Colonial	1846	ACHU; HHA		Canning Downs homestead, in 2011.
Clifford House	120 Russell Street, Toowoomba	Mid Victorian	1860	GHA		Clifford House, in 2014.
Cressbrook	Cressbrook, Toogoolawah	Early Victorian	1841-43	HHA; ACH		Cressbrook Homestead, in 2010.
Elderslie	Elderslie Station, Winton-Boulia Road, Middleton	Vernacular Colonial	1873	HHA2		Elderslie Homestead, in 1993.
Franklyn Vale	Franklin Vale Road, Grandchester	Mid-Victorian	1870–77	ACH		Franklyn Vale, in 1992.
Gowrie^{a}	2 Warrego Highway, Kingsthorpe	Mid Victorian	1872–73	GHA	Gowrie Mountain Estate; Glory days of a King	
Gracemere	234 Gracemere Road, Gracemere	Vernacular Colonial	1858–59	HHA2; ACH	; Visiting Gracemere; Gracemere early days	Gracemere Homestead, in 1996.
Jimbour	86 Jimbour Station Road, Jimbour	Mid Victorian	1883	HHA; GHA; ACHU		Jimbour House, garden view
Jondaryan	Evanslea Road, Jondaryan	Colonial		GHA		Jondaryan Homestead, in 2003.
Mulabinba	Noosa	Tropical		CEA	Tropical hinterland garden	
Newstead House	Corner Newstead Ave and Breakfast Creek Road, Newstead, Brisbane	Georgian, Mid-Victorian	1846	GHA		Newstead House, in 2009.
Royal Bull's Head Inn	Brisbane Street, Drayton	Old Colonial	1859	NTA		File:Royal Bull's Head Inn, in 2015.
Silverwood Station	Longreach	Colonial		ACHU	Facebook; Silverwood Organics	
Talgai	Allora, Darling Downs	Colonial, Mid-Victorian	1868–1934	ACHU	; Talgai Homestead - Australian E-Heritage; Talgai on the Darling Downs	Talgai Homestead, in 1995.
Townsville Heritage Centre	5 Castling Street, Townsville	Colonial	1888–1921	NTA	Townsville Heritage Centre	
Wolston House	223 Grindle Road, Wacol	Old Colonial	1852–1860s	NTA		Wolston House, in 2009.
Wyaralong	Beaudesert	Late Victorian	1895–1907	ACH	The Overflow vineyard	
Wylarah	2431 South Burrandowan Road, Kumbia	Late Victorian; Vernacular timber	1891	ACH; HHA2		Wylarah, in 1992.
Yandina Station	Yandina Creek	Mid-Victorian	c. 1850s	CEA	Yandina Station, Wedding & Function Venue	

^a Note to be confused with Gowrie House, located in East Toowoomba.

== South Australia ==
Name	Address	Style	Date	Source	Notes	Image
Anlaby Station	829 Anlaby Rd, Hamilton SA 5373	Mid-Victorian/Colonial Revival	1859 - 1927	SAHR HHA	House was originally built 1857–59, but was added to by members of the Dutton family until 1927.	
Ayers House	288 North Terrace, Adelaide	Colonial Regency	c. 1850s – c. 1870s	GHA		Ayers House, in 2008.
Beaumont House	631 Glynburn Road, Beaumont, Adelaide	Romanesque-Classical	1851	NTA		Beaumont House, in 2007.
Beltana, including Mt Lyndhurst, Murnpeowi, Cordillo Downs	Beltana	Late Victorian	1862	HHA2		
Bungaree	431 Bungaree Road, Bungaree, Clare	Victorian Filigree	1850	HHA		
Clairville	Corner of Jeffs St. and Markwick Crescent, Campbelltown	Late Georgian	1840	ACH	Demolished(?)	
Collingrove	450 Eden Valley Road, Angaston	Mid-Victorian Queen Anne	1854	GHA; HHA		
Corryton Park	Wirra Wirra Road, via Williamstown	Mid-Victorian	1851–52	GHA; HHA2		
Early Settler's Cottage	Keith	Vernacular	1894	NTA		
Encounter Coast Discovery Centre	2 Flinders Parade, Victor Harbor	Mid-Victorian	1866	NTA		
Forest Lodge	Aldgate	Late Victorian	1892	ACH		
Gamble Cottage	Blackwood	Late Victorian	1902	NTA		
Glencoe Woolshed	Glencoe	Mid-Victorian	1863	NTA		
Goolwa Museum	Goolwa	Mid-Victorian	1872	NTA		
Hill River Estate	Clare Valley	Early Victorian	1849	ACH		
Holland House	via Lyndoch	Gothic Victorian	1854	HHA2		
Hope Cottage	Centenary Ave, Kingscote, Kangaroo Island	Georgian	1859	NTA		
Kadlunga	Kadlunga Road, Mintaro	Colonial	1857	Australian Heritage Database		Kadlunga being renovated in 1919.
Kingsford	Kingsford	Georgian	1859	HHA2	Kingsford Homestead | Location; Kingsford Homestead	
Koppio Smithy	RSD, Koppio	Vernacular	1890	NTA	Koppio Smithy Museum, National Trust	
Lindsay Park	Angaston	Edwardian	1850–90s	GHA	Lindsay Park, Homestead Complex	
Maitland Museum	Gardiner Terrace, Maitland	Late Victorian	1877	NTA	Maitland Museum, National Trust	
Martindale Hall	Manoora Road, Mintaro	Georgian	1879	HHA		Martindale Hall, in 2009.
Marybank	Rostrevor, Adelaide Hills	Late Georgian		ACH	Marybank – Farm	
Matta House	Matta Flat	Colonial	1863	NTA	Matta House | National Trust	
Mill Cottage	1 Mill Road, Bridgewater	Mid Victorian	1866	NTA	Mill Cottage Museum	
Miners Cottage	Moonta Mines	Vernacular	1870	NTA	Moonta Miners Cottage and Heritage Garden	
Mount Laura Station	Whyalla Norrie	Federation	1922	NTA	Mount Laura Station, National Trust	
North Bundaleer Homestead	RM Williams Way, Jamestown	Federation Queen Anne	1898–1901	ACHU	North Bundaleer Homestead Complex | Register of the National Estate;; Historic Jamestown homestead; Beautiful North Bundaleer homestead	
Olivewood	Renmark	Vernacular	1889	NTA	Olivewood Historic Homestead	
Padthaway Homestead and Cottage	Padthaway	Late Victorian Filigree	1882	HHA2	Padthaway Homestead and Cottage | Aust. Heritage; Padthaway Estate Homestead	
Para	29-31 Penrith Avenue, Gawler	Georgian, Late Victorian	1851–62	GHA; HHA2; ACHU	Para Para Mansion - Gawler; Para Para homestead • Photograph; Para Para Mansion Penrith Avenue - Gawler	Para Para, in 2012.
Petticoat Lane	Petticoat Lane, Penola	Vernacular	1850	NTA	Sharam Cottages, Penola	
Pewsey Vale	Lyndoch	Early Victorian	1839	HHA	Pewsey Vale	
Poltalloch Homestead	Poltalloch	Late Victorian	1876–77	GHA; HHA2		
Princess Royal	Burra	Mid Victorian; Victorian Georgian	c. 1860s	GHA; HHA	Princess Royal Station - Home	
Station	Mt Crawford, near Williamstown	Mid Victorian	Late c. 1830s	HHA	Byron Hugh MacLachlan, Australian Dictionary of Biography; Photographs	
Stangate House and Garden	Fenchurch Road, Aldgate, Mount Lofty	Inter-War	c. 1940s	NTA		
Wairoa	160 Mount Barker Road, Aldgate, Adelaide Hills	Queen Anne	1893	ACH		
Wattle Hills	Myponga	Vernacular Colonial	c. 1850s	ACHU	Sale and photos; Fleurieu Peninsula Restoration, Aust Country;	
Wellington Lodge		Late Victorian	1867–90?	ACH	Wellington Lodge | Commercial Angus Beef	
Yallum Park	Penola	Late Victorian	1840	HHA	Open Gardens	

== Tasmania ==
Name	Address	Style	Date	Source	Notes	Image
Ashby Homestead	Ross	Georgian	1904	LIH	Ashby Homestead, Ross	
Beaufront and Garden	Ross	Georgian; Regency	1837	GHA; HHA; CHT		
Belgrove	3121 Midland Hwy, Kempton	Georgian	1888	CHT		
Belmont Vineyard	1431 Richmond Road, Clarence	Georgian	1837	CHT		
Bentley Estate and Landscape	Mole Creek Road, Chudleigh	Mid-Victorian	1879	CHT		
Bicton	338 Isis Road, Campbell Town	Georgian	1837	ACH		
Bowood	2725 Bridport Rd, Bridport	Georgian	1844	LIH		
Brickendon	Longford	Georgian	1828–45	GHA; HHA		The house at Brickendon Estate, near Longford
Cambria Homestead and Outbuildings	13566 Tasman Highway, Swansea	Colonial; Georgian	1836	CHT; ACH		
Cheshunt House	Deloraine	Italianate Victorian	1851–85	CHT		
Clairville	Evandale	Colonial	c. 1830s	GHA		
Clarendon and Outbuildings	234 Clarendon Station Road, Nile, via Evandale	Georgian; Regency	1834–38	GHA; HHA; ACH		Clarendon House front entrance
Clifton Priory	Bothwell	Tudor Revival	1847	LIH		
Coswell	Oyster Bay	Georgian		ACH		
Cullenswood	St Marys	Georgian; Queen Anne	1841	LIH		
Dalness and Garden	Evandale	Georgian; Regency	1839	CHT		
Douglas Park	Douglas Park Road, Campbell Town	Georgian	1838	HHA2; CHT		
Dunedin and Garden	91 Blessington Road, St. Leonards	Victorian Gothic	1864	CHT		
Egleston	1726 Macquarie Road, Campbell Town	Georgian	1830	CHT		
Ellenthorpe Hall	Auburn Road, Ross	Georgian	1827	CHT		
Elphin House and Garden	3 Olive Street, Elphin, Launceston	Gothic Revival	c. 1890s	LIH		
Entally House	Hadspen	Colonial	1821	GHA		
Eskleigh	Perth	Victorian	c. 1870s	GHA		
Exton House	3479 Bass Highway, Exton	Early Victorian	c. 1840s	CHT		
Forcett House	RA 120 Lewisham Road, Lewisham	Late Georgian	c. 1830s	CHT; ACH		
Franklin House	Youngtown, Launceston	Georgian	1838	GHA		Franklin House from road, in 2015.
Fulham Farm	258 Fulham Road, Dunalley		c. 1840s	LIH		
Haggerstone Farm	Midland Highway, Perth	Georgian		LIH		
Hamilton Old Schoolhouse	Lyell Highway, Hamilton	Gothic Revival	1856	LIH		
High Peak & Garden	Neika, Hobart	Federation Queen Anne	1891	CHT		
Highfield House	143 Greenhills Road, Stanley	Colonial; Georgian	1832–45	CHT		Highfield House at Stanley, in 2015.
Hollow Tree	Llanberis	Gothic Revival	c. 1850s	CHT		
Home Hill and Garden	77 Middle Road, Devonport	Federation Queen Anne	1916	NTA		
Killymoon	Esk Main Road, St Marys, Fingal	Georgian	1842–48	HHA; ACH		
Lake House	599 Delmont Road, Cressy	Georgian	1830	CHT; ACH		
Malahide	Mangana Road, Fingal	Colonial	1827–28	HHA; ACH		
Mona Vale	374-398 Mona Vale Road, Ross	Mid-Victorian	1864–67	HHA; ACH		Sketch of Mona Vale, in 1927.
Morningside	Macquarie River	Georgian	1839	ACH		
Mount Pleasant	9 Luxmore Place, Prospect, Launceston	Late Victorian	1870	GHA		
Native Point	Perth	Early Victorian	1842	GHA		
Newstead House	Launceston	Regency	1876	GHA		
Northbury	Longford	Victorian Italianate	1862	GHA		
Oak Lodge	Richmond	Georgiran	1831–42	NTA		
Ormiston House	1 Esplanade, Strahan	Federation Queen Anne	1899	LIH		
Panshanger	366 Panshanger Road, Cressy	Colonial	1831–34	HHA; ACH; LIH		Panshanger House in Longford, Tasmania
Penghana	32 Esplanade, Queenstown	Federation Queen Anne	1898	NTA		
Peppers Calstock	14746 Highland Lakes Road, Deloraine	Georgian	1837–53	CHT		
Quamby	1145 Westwood Road, Hagley	Colonial	1828–38	HHA2		
Ratho Homestead and Ratho Farm Golf	2122 Highway, Bothwell	Georgian	1824–37	LIH; ACH		
Rhodes	South Esk, Longford	Early Victorian	c. 1840s	ACH		
Richmond Hill	1097 Cressy Road, Cressy	Georgian	1823	ACH		
Rosedale	Elizabeth River	Early Victorian	1828–50	ACH		
Rouseville	272 Davey Street, Hobart	Tudor Revival	1869	LIH		
Runnymede and Garden	61 Bay Road, New Town	Georgian Revival	1836–44	GHA; NTA		
Selborne	100 King Street, Dynnyrne	Federation Queen Anne	1884	LIH		
Shene	76 Shene Road, Pontville	Gothic Revival	1813	LIH		
Somercotes	Ross	Colonial	1826–42	GHA; HHA		
StrathAyr (Hop Kilns)	70 Back Tea Tree Road, Richmond	Colonial	1837	LIH		
Streanshalh	Campbell Town	Georgian	c. 1830s – c. 1840s	ACH		
Summerhome and Garden	Moonah	Georgian	c. 1840s	ACH		
The Grange	Campbell Town	Gothic Revival	1847	GHA		
The Jolly Farmer Inn	21 Norfolk Street, Perth	Georgian	1826	LIH		
Valleyfield Homestead	120 Hamilton Road, New Norfolk	Colonial Filigree	1822	HHA2		
Wentworth House	Bothwell	Early Victorian	1833	GHA		
White House	Corner of Lonsdale Promenade and King Street, Westbury	Georgian		NTA		
Wickford and Mill	Longford	Georgian	1838–39	ACH		
Woodlands	793 Tea Tree Road, Tea Tree	Colonial	1842	LIH		
Woolmers	658 Woolmers Lane, Longford	Georgian	1818–31	HHA; ACH; GHA		Woolmers, in Longford, in 2009.
Wybra Hall	Mangalore	Federation Queen Anne	1905	LIH		

== Victoria ==
Name	Address	Style	Date	Source	Notes	Image
All Saints Estate	Wahgunyah		1864	ACHU		The castellated turrets of the All Saints Estate, in 2009.
Alton	Mount Macedon	Late Victorian	1874–82	ACH		
Ardgartan	Grassdale	Colonial	1935	GPCV	Edna Walling	
Banongill	Skipton	Federation Queen Anne	1853	GPCV	Open Gardens Australia – Banongill Station; Banongill opens to the public; Banongill Station sold; William Guilfoyle	
Banyule	60 Buckingham Drive, Heidelberg	Tudor Revival	1849	HHA2	Banyule Homestead – OnlyMelbourne; Heidelberg Historical Society – Banyule part1, part2; Sale and photos; Sale for $5.2 million	
Barwon Grange	Barwon Grange	Gothic	c. 1850s	GHA	Barwon Grange | National Trust	
Berrambool	Wickliffe	Gothic Revival	1868	Victorian Heritage Register		
Blackwood	Penshurst	Arts & Crafts	1891–92	ACH	Blackwood Homestead Complex – Victorian Heritage Database	
Bontharambo	Wangaratta	Victorian Italianate	1858	HHA	Bontharambo Homestead – VHD; House & Garden – VHD; Joseph Docker	
Brie Brie	Glenthompson	American Bungalow	1863	GPCV	Brie Brie Homestead Complex – VHD; Australian E-Heritage	
Cameron Lodge	767 Mount Macedon Road, Mount Macedon	Late Victorian	1886	CEA	Garden photographs	
Chatsworth House and Garden	Chatsworth	Mid Victorian	1863	GPCV	Chatsworth House Functions; Chatsworth House Offering; Chatsworth House on market;	
Como House and Garden	South Yarra	Victorian Filigree	c. 1830s – c. 1850s	GHA	Como House and Garden, National Trust	
Dalvui and Garden	Noorat	Federation Queen Anne	1909	CEA; GPCV	Federation-House – Dalvui, Terang, Vic; Dalvui House & Garden – VHD; Dalvui – a grand Guilfoyle garden	
Duneira	Officer Lane, Mount Macedon	Late Victorian	1875	CEA	Duneira, Mount Macedon; Events brochure	
Eeyeuk	Kolora	Mid Victorian	1874–75	ACH	Eeyeuk Homestead – Victorian Heritage Database	
Emu Bottom Homestead	Sunbury	Colonial	1836	HHA2	The Epicurean Emu Bottom	
Ercildoun	Ballarat	Mid-Victorian; Scottish baronial revival	1837–59	VHR; NTA (Vic); defunct RNE	CEA	
Exford	Melton		1842	HHA		
Eynesbury Station	Eynesbury	Mid Victorian	1848	HHA2	Homestead Restaurant, Eynesbury Golf	
Fern Vale Farm		Edwardian	1890	CEA	Radical Terrace; Picture-Perfect Country House	
Fulham homestead	Kanagulk		1840s			
Glenfine	150 Glenfine Road, Werneth	Victorian Gothic	1873		Glenfine Mining & Homestead Complex (VHD name)	
Golf Hill	Shelford	Late Victorian	c. 1870s	GHA	Golf Hill Homestead & Outbuildings	
Green Hills and Rose Garden	Minhamite	Mid Victorian	1872–73	GPCV	Green Hills, Hawkesdale, Moyne Shire, VHD	
Gulf Station	Yarra Glen	Colonial	1854	HHA2	Gulf Station, National Trust; Gulf Station Historic Farm; Yarra Valley Gulf Station renovation	
Kolor	near Penshurst	Late Victorian	1867	HHA2	Kolor Homestead complex – VHD; Twomey Family of Kolor	
Larra	Derrinallum	Gothic, Mid Victorian	1873–75	GPCV; HHA2	Larra Property; The Larra stables, VHD; and Significant Place VHD; Larra Homestead & Larra Stables – Register of the National Estate	
Larundel	Elaine, near Cargerie	Classical Garden	c. 1870s	CEA	Paul Bangay designed garden; Sold 2011 for $14 million	
Lavandula	Shepherds Flat	Vernacular	c. 1850s	CEA	Lavandula, Swiss Italian Farm	
Leslie Manor	Camperdown	Mid Victorian	1845	GPCV	The Leslie Manor Trust Dairy Farms; Leslie Manor Homestead, VHD	
Longerenong Homestead	897 Burnt Clay Road Longerenong	Gothic Revival	1862	HHA2	Longerenong homestead, VHD; Longerenong Homestead near Horsham	
Madowla Park	1584 Stewart's	Old Colonial	1845	HHA2	Madowla Park - VHD; Water for Rivers sells Madowla Park	
Maretimo		Colonial, Georgian	1854	GHA	Maretimo, VHD	
McCrae Homestead & Cottage	McCrae	Vernacular	1842–84	HHA2	McCrae Cottage, National Trust	
Meningoort	Camperdown	Late Victorian	1852–87	ACH	Meningoort - Victorian Heritage Database	
Merrang	Hexham	Victorian Italianate	1859	HHA	Merrang Station e-Heritage	
Minjah Homestead and Garden	Hawksdale, near Woolsthorpe; or Caramut	Mid Victorian Filigree	1870	GPCV	Minjah Homestead - VHD; Minjah Homestead | Aust. Heritage; Friends of Warrnambool 2014; China begins its wool empire	
Mintaro	Romsey	Mid Victorian	1882	ACH	Victorian Heritage Database; Mansion of dreams and heartbreak - The Age	
Mokanger	Cavendish	Victorian Vernacular	1864	GPCV	Mokanger Homestead complex - VHD; South Mokanger Woolshed complex	
Mount Boninyong	Scotsburn	Late Victorian	1884	GPCV	Mount Buninyong Winery; Scotsburn | Victorian Places; Buninyong Visitor Guide	
Mount Sturgeon Homestead	Dunkeld	Mid Victorian	1850	GPCV	Mount Sturgeon Homestead | Royal Mail; Mount Sturgeon Homestead and Cottages; Mount Sturgeon Homestead Complex | VHD	
Mt William Homestead and Garden	Willaura	Inter-War	c. 1919	GPCV	Mt William Homestead - VHD; Mount William Station; Mt William photo album	
Mount Talbot Homestead	Toolondo, near Horsham	Mid Victorian Georgian	1866	HHA2	Mount Talbot Homestead | HCV; Mount Talbot homestead | VHD	
Murdeduke	730 Cressy Road, Winchelsea	Gothic Revival	1875	GPCV	Murdeduke Homestead - Victorian Heritage; Murdeduke Homestead - Australian E-Heritage; Barwon Blog: The Murdeduke Estate; Murdeduke Agriculture - Home	
Murndal	Tahara, Hamilton	Colonial, Georgian, Federation Queen Anne	c. 1840s–1906	GHA; HHA; GPCV	Murndal - VHD - Heritage Council of Victoria	
Nareen	Nareen	Colonial Bungalow	1905	GPCV	Nareen Station; Nareen Homestead Complex; Nareen & Tarrayoukyan District Pioneers; Malcolm Fraser and Nareen	
Narrapumelap	153 Narrapumelap Road, Wickliffe	French Neo-Gothic	1878		Narrapumelap Homstead (VHD name)	
	Wareek	Gothic Revival	1863–65	ACH	Victorian Heritage Database H0343	
Rio Vista''	Mildura		c. 1890s	GHA	Rio Vista Historic House	
Rippon Lea		Romanesque	1868	GHA	Rippon Lea Estate, National Trust	Rippon Lea, in 2015
Rupertswood	Sunbury, Victoria		1874			
Spray Farm	Ellenvale	Mid Victorian	1851	CEA	A Paul Bangay design; Historic Spray Farm $10m.; Spray Farm, Bellarine, venue	
St Ambrose Farm	Woodend	Classical	1888	CEA	Paul Bangay's previous home's 'Enchanted Garden'; Photos	
St Enochs Station	Beaufort, Pyrenees	Mid Victorian	c. 1840s	ACHU	St Enoch's Pastoral Run; Mahkwallock - aka Mawallock and Mawallok; www.farmday.com.au	
St Leonards Vineyard	Wahgunyah	Colonial	c. 1860s	ACHU	St Leonards Vineyard; Winemakers of Rutherglen	
Talindert	Camperdown	Late Victorian	1889–1901	ACH	Talindert House & Garden	
Terrinallum		Art Deco	1860–1930	GPCV	Aust. Heritage; Historic Terinallum for sale; Hephzibah Menuhin 1920–1981; The Governor at Terrinallum	
The Gums	Penshurst	Mid Victorian	1876–77	ACH	The Gums - Victorian Heritage Database	
Warrambeen	Shelford	Mid Victorian	c. 1860s	GPCV	Warrambeen Homestead and Outbuildings; Warrambeen Estate; Shelford Garden	
Warrock	Casterton	Carpenter Gothic	1848	HHA	Federation-House - Casterton, Vic Heritage, Warrock Homestead; Warrock Homestead, VHD	
Werribee Park	Werribee	Victorian Italianate	1875	HHA	Parks Victoria - Werribee Park	Werribee Park mansion
Wiridgil	Weerite	Late Victorian	1885	ACH	Wiridgil - Victorian Heritage Database	
Wormbete	Winchelsea	Gothic Revival	c. 1840s	GPCV	Wormbete Estate; Wormbete Homestead - VHD; Henry Hopkins Wormbete	
Yarram Park	Willaura	Late Victorian	1893	GPCV	Former Yarram Yarram - VHD; Yarram Park; Yarram Park stud at Willaura; 'The Land of the Golden Fleece' Streeton	

== Western Australia ==
Name	Address	Style	Date	Source	Notes	Image
Berkshire Valley	Old Geraldton Road, Berkshire Valley, Moora	Colonial	1842	HHA		
Bridgedale		Old Colonial	1862	GHA	Bridgedale, National Trust	
The Cliffe	25 Bindaring Parade, Peppermint Grove	Federation Bungalow	1894	Shire of Peppermint Grove	Childhood home of David McComb and Robert McComb of Australian rock band The Triffids.	
Fairview	Heytesbury Road Subiaco.	Queen Anne Federation	1915	Western Towns & Buildings	Built for Scottish Ice Engineer - John Kennedy. Owned for 40 years by heritage activist Polly Willis. Hall and Entry leadlights of Bearded Iris and Roses attributed to Arthur Clarke of Barnett Bros East Perth.	
Kumanka	1532 Bruce Rock East Road, Bruce Rock	Inter-War		ACHU	Kumanka Kreations, Facebook	
Leschenault	Lot 963 Estuary Dr Vittoria, Bunbury	Vernacular Colonial	1854–74	GHA; HHA2	Leschenault Homestead - Heritage Council of WA; Leschenault Homestead - inHerit; Bunbury Port Authority - Leschenault Homestead; Photo: Morning light on Leschenault Homestead	
Lowlands Homestead	509 Lowlands Road Mardella, near Serpentine River	Old Colonial; Georgian; Edwardian; Federation Queen Anne	1845–1925	GHA; HHA2	Lowlands Homestead, inHerit; Visit to Lowlands	
Old Blythewood	Pinjarra	Old Colonial Georgian	1860	GHA	Old Blythewood, National Trust; Old Blythewood – inHerit	
Sandilands	Busselton	Victorian Georgian	1850	GHA	Sandilands – inHerit	
St Werburgh's		Old Colonial	c. 1840s	GHA	St. Werburgh's Chapel – inHerit; Heritage, St. Werburgh's Chapel	
Strawberry Hill	Mira Mar, Albany	Vernacular	1831	HHA	Old Farm, Strawberry Hill, National Trust;	Strawberry Hill, date unknown.
The Old Farm	Mira Mar, Albany	Vernacular	1836	GHA	Old Farm, Strawberry Hill | National Trust	Farm House at Old Farm, in 2005.
Wallcliffe House		Victorian Georgian	1865	GHA; HHA	Wallcliffe House, ABC; Historic home lost to Margaret River fire	
Wonnerup House	Busselton	Old Colonial	1859	GHA; HHA2	Wonnerup, National Trust	Wonnerup House, in 2011
Woodbridge		Late Victorian and Queen Anne	1885	GHA	Woodbridge | National Trust	
Wooleen Station and Homestead			1886	ACHU	Wooleen Station and Homestead; Wooleen Station Homestead Group; Wooleen Station - Australia's Golden Outback; Letter From Wooleen - ABC	

== See also ==
- Heritage Gardens in Australia

== Statistics ==
- Reference Source books=10;
- Homesteads listed (gross)=366
- Total entries after duplications and elimination=312
