= Mooleric =

Historic homestead in Victoria, Australia

- Mooleric Homestead

- Location in Colac Otway Shire, Victoria
- 38°14′26″S 143°47′23″E
- Type: Homestead, associated built facilities and grounds
- Location: Ombersley, Victoria, Australia
- Nearest city: Colac

History
- Built: 1871
- Built for: James Ford Strachan

Site notes
- Architect(s): Alexander Davidson & George Henderson
- Architectural style: Victorian Gothic

Mooleric is a historic pastoral property and homestead near Birregurra in western Victoria, Australia. Situated at the foot of Mount Gellibrand, the property originated within a pastoral holding established during the early European settlement of the Port Phillip District and later became associated with the Strachan, Armytage and Ramsay families. The homestead is a large bluestone residence principally dating from the 1871, surrounded by a five-acre garden laid out in the early twentieth to a design by landscape gardener William Guilfoyle. The wider complex historically included a bluestone woolshed, stables and other pastoral buildings.

== History ==
The land on which Mooleric developed formed part of the early Mount Gellibrand pastoral country taken up during the late 1830s. James Matson and Captain Tregurtha, master of the brig Henry, selected the area in 1838, at a time when sheep were being brought across Bass Strait from Van Diemen's Land and landed near Point Henry. Tregurtha's tenure was brief. His brother-in-law, Alexander Dennis, subsequently returned to the district after finding country farther west unsuitable during a dry season and acquired Tregurtha's sheep together with his right to occupy Mooleric. After about 18 months, Dennis disposed of the northern portion around Mount Gellibrand to Charles Ayrey.

Mooleric eventually emerged as a property of approximately 5,500 acres and was acquired by James Ford Strachan in 1861. Strachan was among the early settlers of the Port Phillip District, having arrived in Melbourne in 1836, and the property remained in his family for more than two decades. His son rented Mooleric from him during this period.

The principal group of buildings was developed during the Strachan era. In 1871, architects Davidson and Henderson designed the bluestone homestead together with its woolshed, stables and associated outbuildings. The residence was initially a single-storey structure, constructed from bluestone quarried and worked on the estate itself. Subsequent generations substantially enlarge the house while retaining the original stone building at its core.

In 1884, Strachan's trustees sold Mooleric to Ferdinand Felix Armytage, who was already associated with nearby Turkeith. Arymtage and his wife Annie Fairbairn lived at Turkeith with their family until his death in 1890. Mooleric changed hands again in 1899, when it was purchased by brothers Robert and Urquhart Ramsay.

The Ramsays subsequently expanded their interests in the district. In 1903, they joined their cousin Thomas McKellar in purchasing Turkeith, after which the partnership was reorganised and the properties divided between the brothers. Urquhart Ramsay made Turkeith his home, while Robert Ramsay retained Mooleric and later enlarged the holding through the acquisition of Bleak House, bringing his property to about 6,500 acres. Robert lived at Mooleric with his wife Mabel, while Urquhart and his wife Janet Russell Kininmonth settled at neighbouring Turkeith.

Robert Andrew Ramsay

View of the homestead from the garden

Both brothers had earlier attended Scotch College, where they distinguished themselves in sport. Robert captained the school's cricket and football teams, while Urquhart participated in football, cricket and rowing. Their later careers were centred on pastoralism and wool production, and both teams became prominent members of the Western District grazing community.

The gardens surrounding Mooleric were laid out in 1903 to a design by William Guilfoyle, the landscape designer and long-serving director of the Royal Botanic Gardens, Melbourne. His plan incorporated a sweeping cypress-lined entrance drive, curving garden beds edged with stone and a range of ornamental and exotic plants. The grounds also reflected the recreational life of a prosperous pastoral estate, with golf and polo played at Mooleric and a tennis court eventually constructed southwest of the homestead in 1940.

The house itself continued to evolve under the Ramsays. A second bluestone storey was constructed over part of the original residence in 1923 to provide a schoolroom and accommodation for a private tutor, with this area later being converted into a self-contained flat. A distinctive hexagonal tower was added in 1926, accompanied by a new section of driveway, while a brick wing followed in 1932. Other alterations enlarged several principal rooms and introduced features including a bay window to the drawing room.

Robert Andrew Ramsay also became prominent in public life beyond Mooleric. He served as president of the Shire of Colac and for 36 years headed the Colac Caledonian Society, where he was instrumental in establishing the town's first Highland pipe band. Ramsay served during the First World War and also supplied numerous horses to the military as remounts. He continued to operate Mooleric as a grazing property during the interwar period. In 1934, a large organised rabbit shoot on the estate involving participants from Colac, Birregurra, Warncoort and Dreeite resulted in 250 hares being killed.

Exterior view of the woolshed

Interior of the woolshed

Mooleric's landscape was affected by the major bushfires of 1944, which destroyed windbreaks and a number of mature cypress and pine trees. Despite these losses, much of Guilfoyle's original garden structure survived, including the principal drive, stone-edged planting areas and examples of plants specified for the garden.

Robert Ramsay and his brother Urquhart both died in 1948. Mooleric remained with Robert's descendants and in 1962 was divided between his sons, Robert and Andrew Ramsay. Over time, parts of the original property were absorbed into neighbouring Turkeith, although the homestead and its immediate landscape remained associated with the Ramsay family for the remainder of the twentieth century. A swimming pool was added to the grounds in 1976.

After approximately a century of Ramsay family ownership, Mooleric was purchased by Bill Gillies and Maryjane Crabtree in 1999. Despite alterations to both the house and landscape over the preceding century, the property retained much of its historic character, including the nineteenth-century bluestone homestead and outbuildings and substantial elements of Guilfoyle's early twentieth-century garden design.

== See also ==
- Murdeduke
- Mountside
- Barwon Park
