= Ingleby Homestead =

Historic homestead in Victoria, Australia

Ingleby
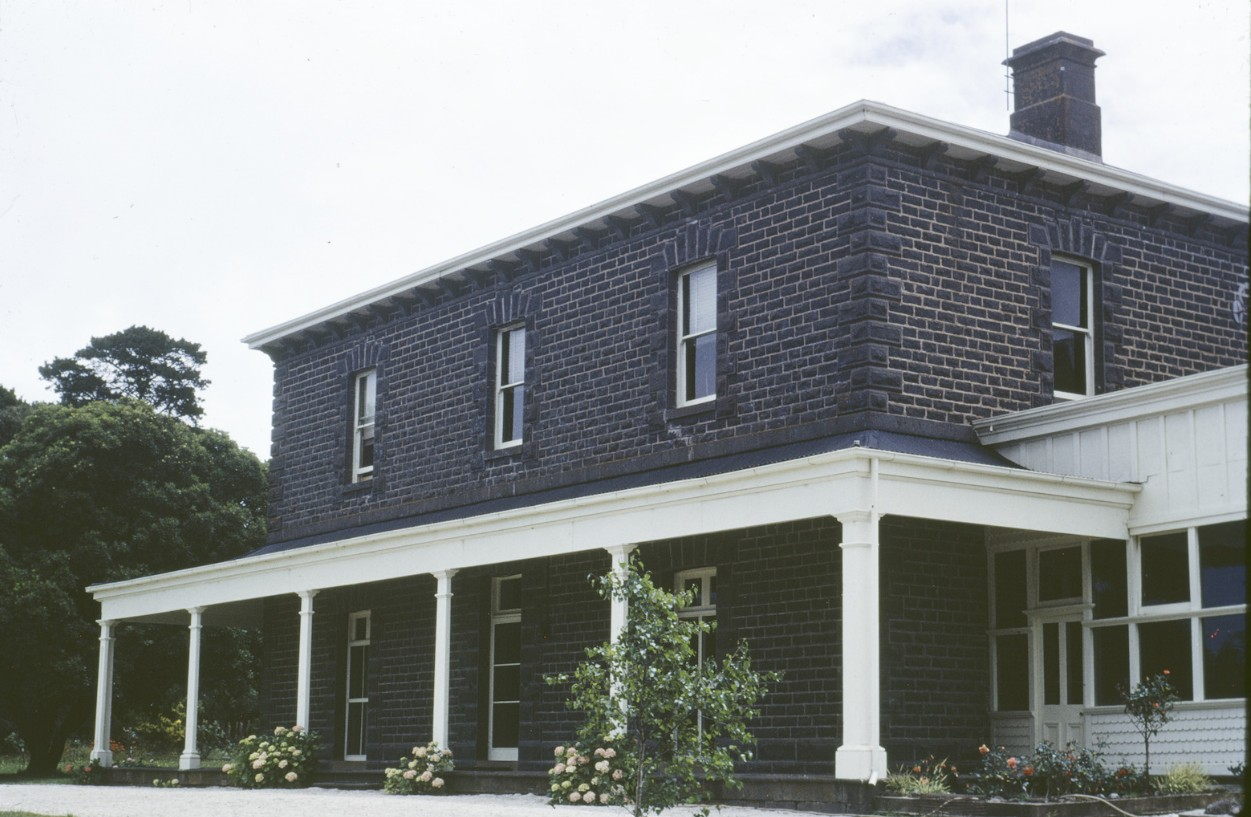
- Ingleby Homestead

- Location in Surf Coast Shire, Victoria
- 38°18′44″S 143°53′57″E
- Type: Homestead, associated built facilities and grounds
- Location: Winchelsea, Victoria, Australia
- Nearest city: Colac

History
- Built: 1860
- Built for: George Armytage (junior)

Site notes
- Architect: Edward Prowse
- Architectural style: Georgian

Ingleby is a historic pastoral property near Winchelsea in Victoria, Australia. The property was established as a pastoral run in the early 1840s and became associated with the Armytage family, one of the prominent pastoral families in the Western District. The surviving complex includes a two-storey bluestone homestead constructed in about 1860, together with a substantial T-plan woolshed and associated station buildings dating from 1882–1883. The buildings form an intact example of a nineteenth-century pastoral station complex and are notable for their architectural detailing.

== History ==
The area around Ingleby was occupied by pastoralists during the rapid expansion of European settlement into the Port Phillip District during the late 1830s and early 1840s. The exploration of inland Victoria by Hamilton Hume and William Hovell in 1824–1825, followed by the arrival of pastoralists from Tasmania and the establishment of settlements around Port Phillip, preceded the rapid expansion of pastoral occupation into the Western District.

Thomas Armytage was among the early pastoralists to follow the settlement established by John Batman and John Fawkner in the Port Phillip District. He arrived at Port Phillip in 1836 and, with partners Charles Franks and Thomas Ricketts, transported livestock across Bass Strait to a site near Werribee. The venture suffered an early setback when Franks and a shepherd were killed by Aboriginal people and the livestock dispersed.

Armytage was also a friend and associate of Joseph Gellibrand, who disappeared while exploring country west of Geelong. Armytage organised a search party for Gellibrand, and during the expedition the part encountered pastoral country on the upper reaches of the Barwon River. Armytage subsequently took up a pastoral run there, naming it Ingleby.

The early occupation of the run was short-lived. Thomas Armytage died of typhoid fever in 1842, and John Stephens leased the Ingleby, or Glenmore, run after his death. By 1847, Ingleby passed to his brother, George Armytage Junior. George Junion and his late brother, amongst others, were the sons of pastoralist George Armytage (Senior), from Derbyshire, England. Thomas Armytage initially managed the property for his brother before his death.

George Armytage Junior prospered at Ingleby and encouraged his father to move from Tasmania to join him. George Senior came to Ingleby in 1847 and remained there for four years before moving to Geelong. In 1859–1860 George Senior constructed The Hermitage in Geelong, while George Junior simultaneously undertook the construction of a substantial new residence at Ingleby. Both men commissioned the Geelong architect Edward Prowse to design their respective houses.

The present Ingleby homestead was constructed in about 1860. Built of bluestone, the two-storey residence replaced an earlier stone house, which subsequently fell into ruin. The homestead has a Colonial Georgian plan combined with Italianate stylistic elements. It became the principal residence of the property.

The Armytage family's association with Ingleby formed part of a much larger pastoral enterprise extending across the Western District, with members of the family owning or developing a number of substantial pastoral properties and residences, including Elcho, Wooloomanata, Windermere, Wormbete, Turkeith, Mount Sturgeon, Fulham and Kongbool. Other members of the family were associated with prominent residences include The Hermitage in Geelong, Como House in South Yarra, and Delgany at Portsea.

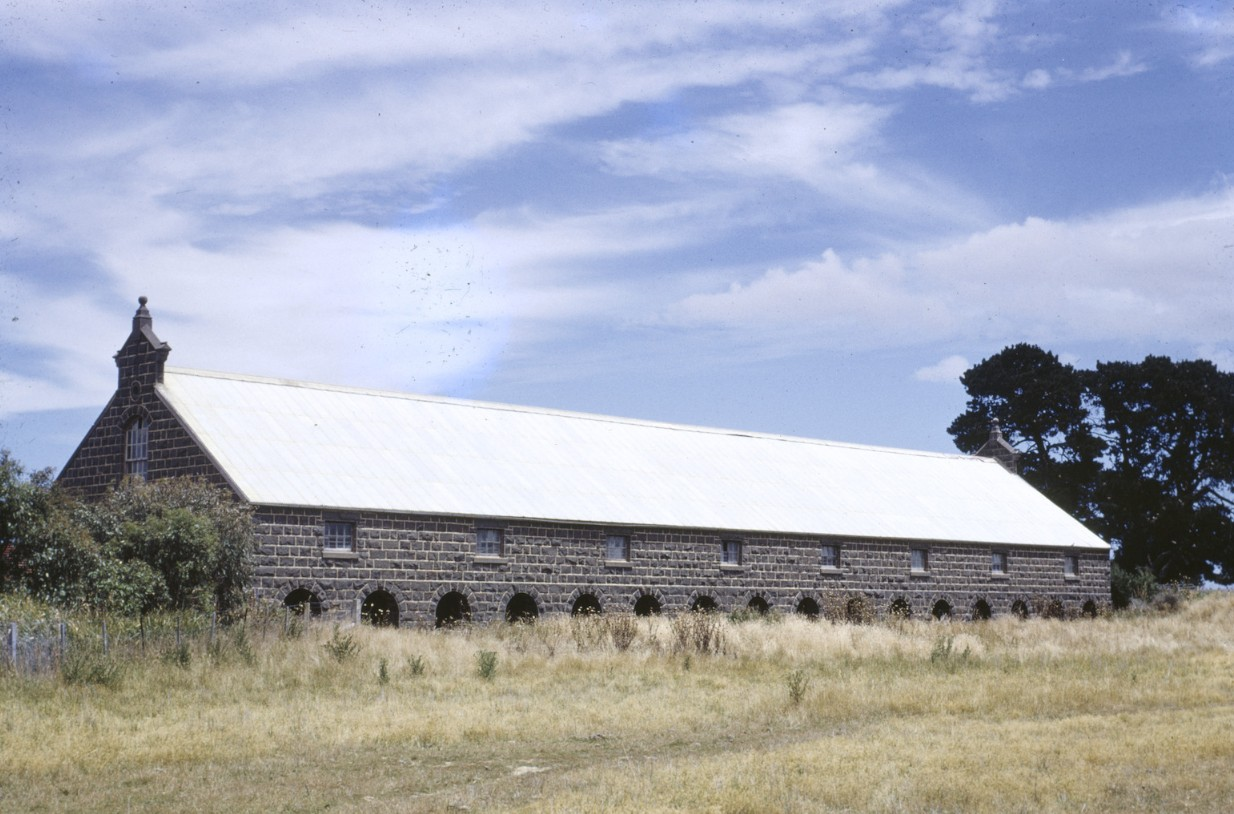
Ingleby woolshed

In 1882–1883, the station was substantially expanded with the construction of a large woolshed and a further group of station buildings. The works were designed by architect A. T. Moran. The woolshed is particularly notable for its T-shaped plan and for the use of reduced Classical architectural details, including pediments and urns. Similar decorative treatment was applied to the otherwise utilitarian station buildings, giving the complex a consistent architectural character.

During the early twentieth century the Ingleby estate began to be subdivided. Parts of the property were sold in 1910 and 1911, beginning a longer process of reducing the size of the original pastoral estate.

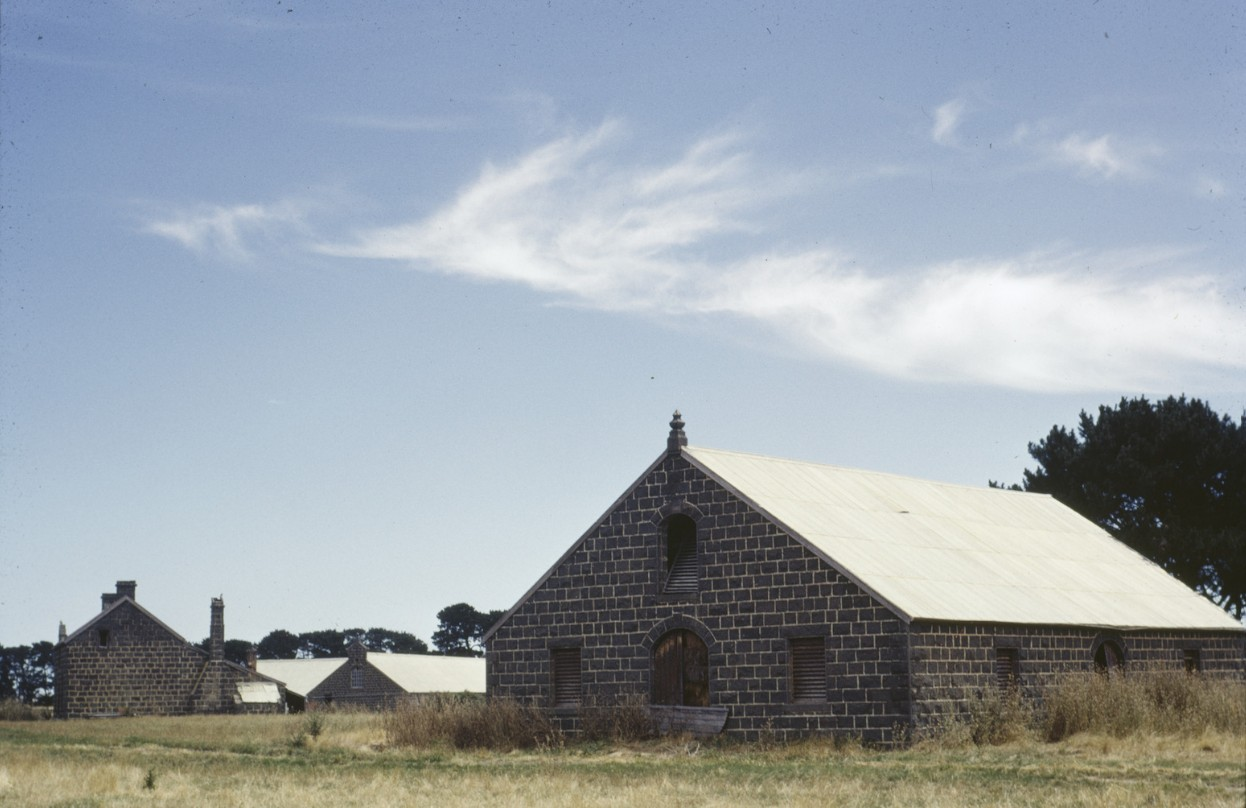
Ingleby woolshed and outbuildings

In 1923, Ingleby passed out of Armytage family ownership when Oscar Armytage sold the homestead to Lyle Read. Further subdivision occurred in 1951, when the property was purchased by Harold Fowler under a soldier settlement programme. The property subsequently passed through several owners.

Peter and Pam Habersberger purchased Ingleby in 1989 and undertook substantial works to reinstate the gardens surrounding the homestead. By this time the stone woolshed and other farm buildings had been separated form the residential portion of the property. The Habersbergers moved to Dalvui, near Noorat in 1997.

== See also ==
- Wormbete
- Barwon Park
