= Mountside =

Historic homestead in Victoria, Australia

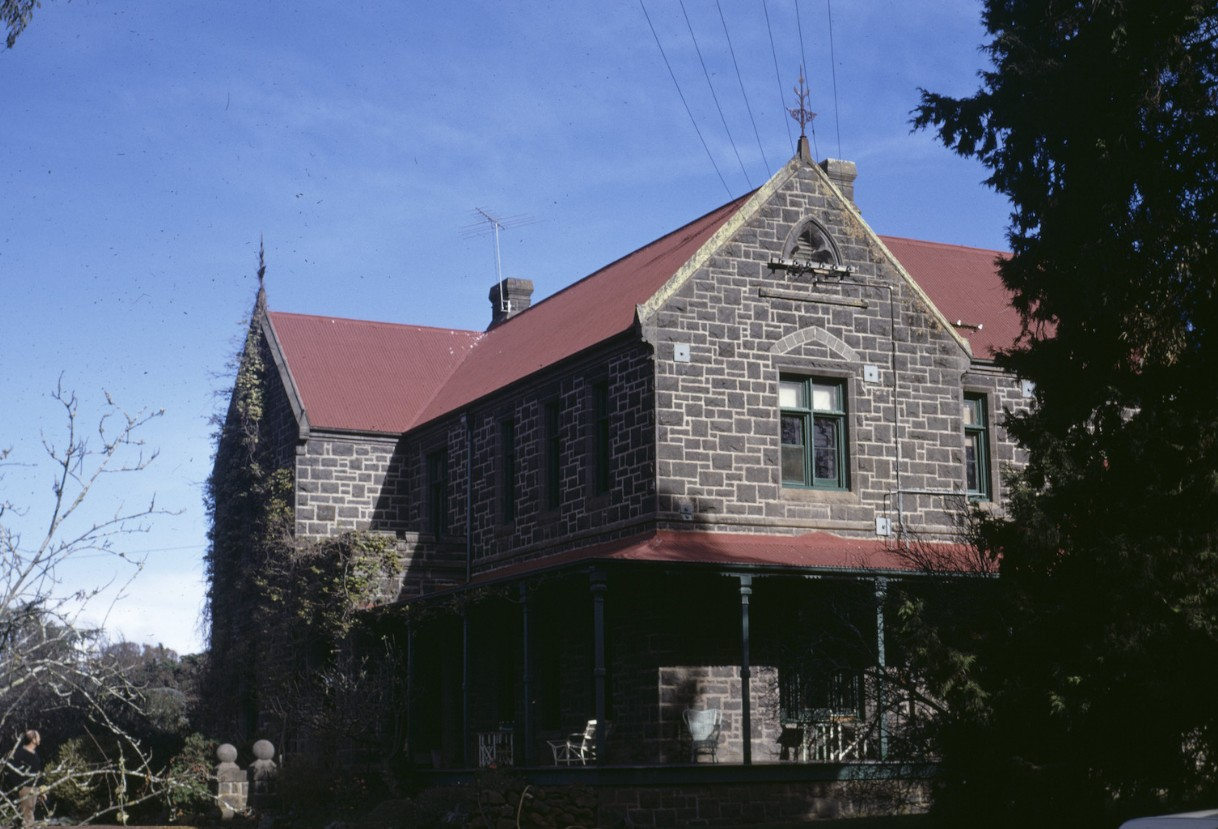
- Mountside Homestead

- Location in Colac Otway Shire, Victoria
- 38°09′45″S 143°50′48″E
- Type: Homestead, associated built facilities and grounds
- Location: Ombersley, Victoria, Australia
- Nearest city: Colac

History
- Built: 1876
- Built for: John Timms

Site notes
- Architectural style: Victorian Gothic

Mountside is a historic homestead and pastoral property at Ombersley, northwest of Winchelsea in western Victoria, Australia. The homestead dates from approximately 1876, with later additions made in 1904 and 1936, and is included on the National Trust register. During the twentieth century the property was particularly associated with the McIntyre family and the breeding of Merino sheep.

== History ==
Mountside Homestead was constructed around 1876, on what was originally part of the larger Mount Hesse estate. The first inhabitant was John Timms and his family. By the late nineteenth century the estate was owned by Walter Tully. In December 1899, the property was sold through Powers, Rutherford and Co. to pastoralist Peter McIntyre of Murdeduke, with a clearing sale subsequently held at Mountside to dispose of Tully's livestock and farming equipment. McIntyre formally acquired the property around January 1900.

Following Peter McIntyre's death, Mountside was divided and his son, Charles Duncan McIntyre, assumed responsibility for the portion associated with the family's sheep stud. Under McIntyre, Mountside developed a reputation for its Merino flock, although the stud suffered a major setback in 1919 when a severe fire swept across the property. Approximately three-quarters of the rams and half of the ewes were lost, together with extensive fencing and established plantations.

Charles McIntyre subsequently rebuilt the stud using selected surviving ewes, rams bred at Mountside and additional stock obtained from Mount Hesse. From 1926 he began exhibiting Mountside sheep at agricultural shows, where the stud received numerous awards at Ballarat, Lismore and Melbourne.

Mountside also had a connection with the First World War through Roger Palmer, who had worked as a tutor at the homestead. Palmer enlisted at the age of 21 and served with the 8th Light Horse Regiment during the Gallipoli campaign. He was killed in action on 7 August 1915.

Charles Duncan McIntyre died suddenly at Mountside in 1932, aged 63. The property subsequently remained associate with his estate and members of the McIntyre family. In 1936, Merino fleeces valued at £87 were stolen from the Mountside woolshed, which was then as belonging to Charles' estate.

By 1939, Mountside was associated with Don and Meg McIntyre, continuing the family's connection with the property, briefly being held by the Daffy family in the 1950s.

== See also ==
- Murdeduke
- Barwon Park
