= John Rout Hopkins =

Australian politician (1828–1897)

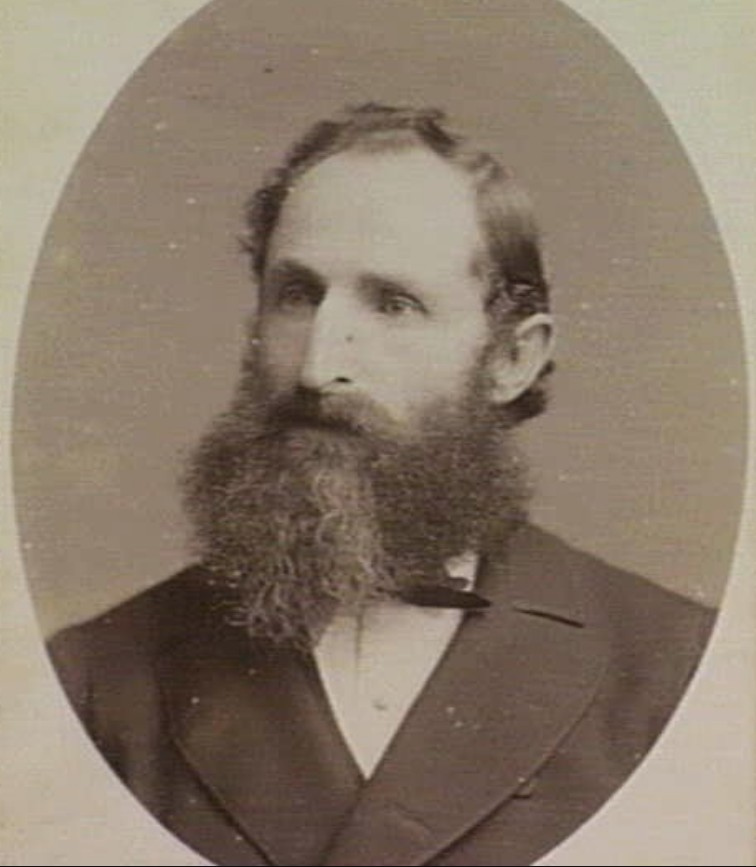
John Rout Hopkins

John Rout Hopkins (18 August 1828 – 20 December 1897) was a politician in the Colony of Victoria.

== History ==
John was born in Hobart, Tasmania on 18 August 1828, the second son of Henry and Sarah (née Rout) Hopkins. He left for Victoria as a young man, for the life of a pastoralist in Winchelsea, Victoria, west of Geelong, to manage his father's property Murdeduke, then owning the "Wormbete Estate" and became quite wealthy. In 1850 he acquired St Stephen's and River stations. In 1854 and 1855 he occupied the Mount Hesse run. He married Eliza Ann, daughter of George Armytage, by whom he had six sons and seven daughters. His daughter Eliza Mary Ann married Samuel Thomas Staughton Sr. in 1874. He was on the Barrabool Shire Council for thirteen years and was its first president and on the Winchelsea Shire Council for thirty-two years and was president for three terms. He was elected to the Victorian Legislative Assembly in 1864 and served in the terms 1864–1865, 1866–1867, 1871–1874, 1874–1877, 1892–1894. He seldom spoke in parliament, but was an active local member and a great supporter of Local Government, being dubbed the "Father of the Local Government Act". He was a longtime councillor and served as Mayor of Geelong from 1892 to 1893.

He was a very social person who entertained lavishly. On 5 June 1888 he married Mrs Susan Emily Rucker and Alice Roberta Purkiss on 5 October 1892.

He died on 20 December 1897 at his home in St Kilda and was interred in the Armytage family vault at the Geelong Eastern Cemetery.
