= Ombersley, Victoria =

Ombersley
- Suburb
- Coordinates: 38°12′28″S 143°48′56″E
- Country: Australia
- State: Victoria
- LGAs: Colac Otway Shire; Surf Coast Shire
- Location: 45 km (28 mi) W of Geelong; 108 km (67 mi) SW of Melbourne

Government
  - State electorate: Polwarth
  - Federal division: Wannon

Population
  - Total: 93 (2021 census)
- Postcode: 3241
Suburbs around Ombersley
Weering	Wingeel and Hesse	Inverleigh
Eurack, Beeac and Irrewarra	Ombersley	Winchelsea
Warncoort	Birregurra	Winchelsea

Ombersley is a locality in Victoria, Australia. Most of the locality is in Colac Otway Shire, with a portion being in adjacent Surf Coast Shire. In the 2021 census, Ombersley had a population of 93.

Ombersley Post Office opened on 1 May 1884 and closed on 30 March 1963.

Mount Hesse Station, a historic homestead listed on the Victorian Heritage Register and classified by the National Trust of Australia, is located within Ombersley. It was developed as a pastoral property around 1837, and the first homestead was built in the early 1840s. A succession of still surviving outbuildings followed thereafter, including a store (1843), shepherd's hut (1849), stables (1849, extended in 1873), woolshed (1852) and gate lodge (1873).

The main Mount Hesse homestead was built in 1856, and extended in 1873. It was severely damaged by fire in 1941 and rebuilt in 1947. The property has historical associations with a number of prominent 19th century pastoralists and businessmen, and the stables and woolshed are amongst the oldest surviving examples of their kind in the state.

A second historic homestead, Mountside Homestead, is also located within Ombersley. It was built in 1876 after the original Mount Hesse estate was divided into three properties, and is also classified by the National Trust of Australia.

The locality includes Mount Gellibrand, an extinct scoria volcano and the future site of a wind farm.

== See also ==
- Mooleric
