= Murdeduke =

Historic homestead in Victoria, Australia

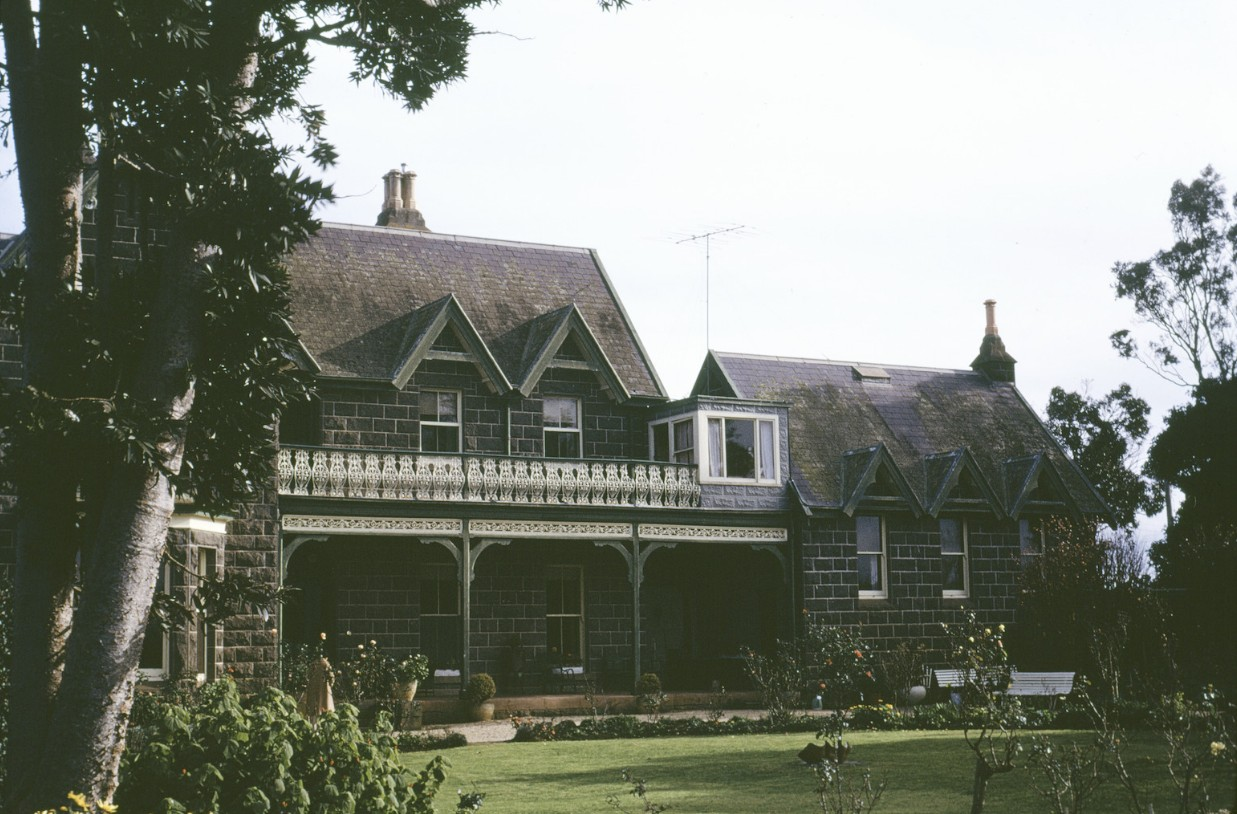
- Murdeduke Homestead

- Location in Surf Coast Shire, Victoria
- 38°12′02″S 143°54′42″E
- Type: Homestead, associated built facilities and grounds
- Location: Winchelsea, Victoria, Australia
- Nearest city: Geelong

History
- Built: 1875 (present homestead)
- Built for: Arthur Hopkins

Site notes
- Architect: Terry & Oakden
- Architectural style: Victorian Gothic

Victorian Heritage Register
- Official name: Murdeduke Homestead
- Type: State heritage (built and natural)
- Designated: 9 June 1960
- Reference no.: HO74

Murdeduke is a historic pastoral property near Winchelsea in Victoria, Australia. Established from part of the former Mount Hesse pastoral run, it has been associated with some of the most prominent pastoral families of the Western District, including the Hopkins, McIntyre and Wilson families. The estate is particularly noted for its substantial Gothic Revival bluestone homestead, constructed in 1875, and for its long history of sheep breeding, wool production and mixed farming.

== History ==
The land that later became Murdeduke formed part of the Mount Hesse Station run, one of the earliest pastoral holdings established in the district following European settlement. In 1837, John Highett and William Harding held the Hesse Plains No. 2 licence, which covered approximately 22,000 acres (8,910 ha) around Lake Murdeduke. William Harding's sister Elizabeth Harding resided on the property until her marriage in 1845 to Thomas Austin of the neighbouring Barwon Park estate. The original homestead associated with this period no longer survives.

In 1851, Henry Hopkins acquired the leasehold interest formerly held by John Highett, while Harding retained the remainder of the original Mount Hesse run. The Hopkins holding occupied land north and west of Barwon Park and extended along the eastern shore of Lake Murdeduke. During the following years, Henry Hopkins consolidated the property and, by 1855, had secured a pre-emptive right to 640 acres of freehold land. He subsequently transferred both the leasehold and freehold portions to his son Arthur Hopkins, and the property became known as Murdeduke. The remainder of the original run continued as Mount Hesse.

Murdeduke formed part of a network of neighbouring Hopkins family pastoral properties. Arthur Hopkins managed Murdeduke, while his brother John Rout Hopkins controlled the nearby St Stephen's run and Wormbete station. Contemporary records indicate that members of the Hopkins family were associated with Murdeduke from at least the mid-1840s, and the property remained under their ownership and management for several decades.

Arthur Hopkins married Lucy Rout in 1854 and established his family at Murdeduke, where they raised three daughters. Like other members of the Hopkins family, Arthur was active in local public affairs and served on the Winchelsea Shire Council. His brother John Rout Hopkins became one of the most prominent public figures in the district, serving as the first president of the Barrabool Shire Council, a long-serving local councilor, mayor of Geelong, and a member of the Victorian Legislative Assembly.

The Hopkins family converted much of Murdeduke from leasehold tenure into freehold ownership following the gradual dismantling of the pastoral licensing system. The original pastoral licence remained in operation until 1870, after which most of the estate was secured as freehold land. During this period, the property developed into an important sheep-grazing enterprise characteristic of the Western District wool industry.

A major transformation occurred in 1875 when Arthur Hopkins demolished the earlier homestead and commissioned a new residence. The Melbourne architectural firm Terry & Oakden designed a substantial 20-room Gothic Revival mansion constructed from bluestone quarried on the property. The building featured steeply pitched slate roofs, with the slate imported from Wales as ballast aboard ships travelling to Australia. The circular driveway in front of the homestead is believed to date from around 1854 and was retained as part of the new design. The following year Arthur commissioned the same architects to construct a separate billiard room.

Arthur Hopkins died in 1882 after a prolonged illness. Following his death, Murdeduke was managed by his son-in-law William Austin, a member of the neighbouring Barwon Park family. In 1886 the estate was sold by executors of Arthur Hopkins' estate to pastoralist Peter McIntyre. At the time of sale, the property comprised approximately 13,568 acres and was described as containing a mixture of rich agricultural land and productive sheep country. The estate had been divided into 14 paddocks supplied by creeks, dams, tanks and wells, while the homestead complex included the bluestone residence, detached billiard room, stables, woolshed, overseer's cottage, and a three-acre garden and orchard.

Under Peter McIntyre, Murdeduke became one of the leading wool-producing estates of the Western District. McIntyre subsequently expanded his holdings through the acquisition of the nearby Mount Pleasant and Mountside estates. He developed a reputation as one of Victoria's foremost sheep breeders and wool growers, particularly in the production of fine Merino wool. In addition to sheep, he established a noted Hereford cattle breeding operation. Improvements were made to both Murdeduke and Mountside, with contemporary accounts praising the comfort and sophistication of the homesteads, including the installation of acetylene gas lighting and modern sewerage systems.

Following McIntyre's death, ownership of his estates passed to his family. Mountside was inherited by his son Charles McIntyre, while Murdeduke passed to another son, Andrew McIntyre. Margaret McIntyre continued to reside at Murdeduke until her death in 1918 at the age of 93.

During the twentieth century, the estate was progressively reduced in size through subdivision. Following Peter McIntyre's death, more than 7,500 acres of the property were subdivided into multiple allotments and offered for sale. Additional land was sold in 1938, reducing the estate further. In 1937, the remaining core of the property was purchased by James William Primrose Wilson.

The Wilson family retain ownership into the present, continuing the property's long agricultural tradition through sheep, cattle, pig and cropping enterprises. The homestead and its surrounding gardens remain notable features of the estate, with mature plantings including Algerian oak, peppercorn, Queensland kauri, and cypress trees.

== See also ==
- Barwon Park
- Ingleby
- Mountside
- Wormbete
