= Mount Sturgeon Homestead =

Historic homestead in Victoria, Australia

Mount Sturgeon
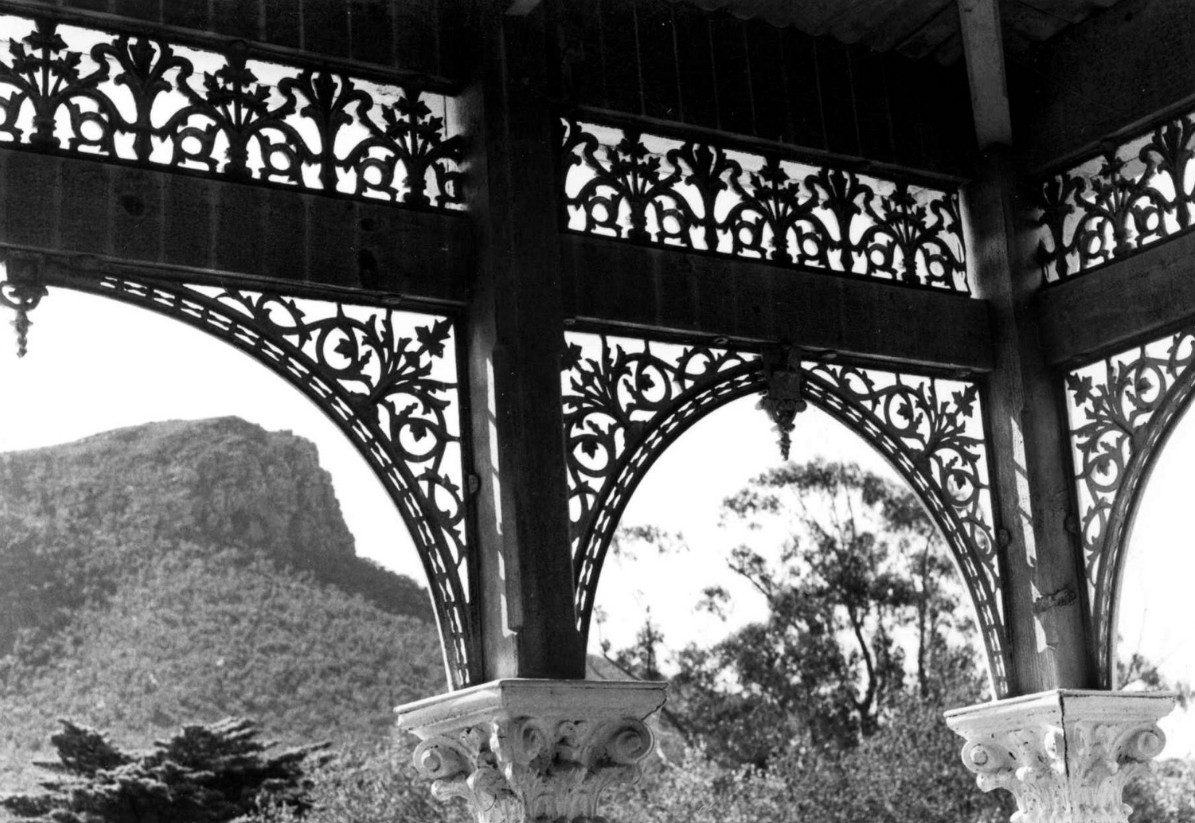
- Detail of Mount Sturgeon Homestead lacework, with Mount Sturgeon in the background (1970)

- Location in Southern Grampians Shire, Victoria
- 37°38′24″S 142°18′32″E
- Type: Homestead, associated built facilities and grounds
- Location: Dunkeld, Victoria, Australia
- Nearest city: Ararat

History
- Built: ~1850 (later additions)
- Built for: Dr. Robert Martin

Site notes
- Architect: Arthur E. Johnson
- Architectural style: Colonial

Victorian Heritage Register
- Official name: Mount Sturgeon Homestead
- Type: State heritage (built and natural)
- Reference no.: 23213

Mount Sturgeon is a historic pastoral property near Dunkeld at the base of Mount Sturgeon, Victoria, Australia. Established as a squatting run in 1839, it was among the earliest pastoral stations in Victoria's Western District and became one of the region's most important sheep-grazing enterprises. The property is notable for its surviving nineteenth-century homestead complex, woolshed and associated outbuildings.

== History ==
The Mount Sturgeon run was established in 1839 when Dr Robert Martin acquired Portland Bay Run No. 192, a pastoral lease situated on the Wannon River beneath Mount Sturgeon. Covering approximately 112,000 acres (45,000 ha), the run was among the earliest pastoral occupations in the Western District. Martin, a wealthy medical practitioner who resided at Banyule in the Melbourne suburb of Heidelberg, rarely lived on the property and instead employed managers to oversee its operation. During the late 1840s a homestead, shearers' cottages and other station buildings were constructed from locally quarried bluestone and sandstone, while portions of the surviving woolshed are also believed to date from this early period.

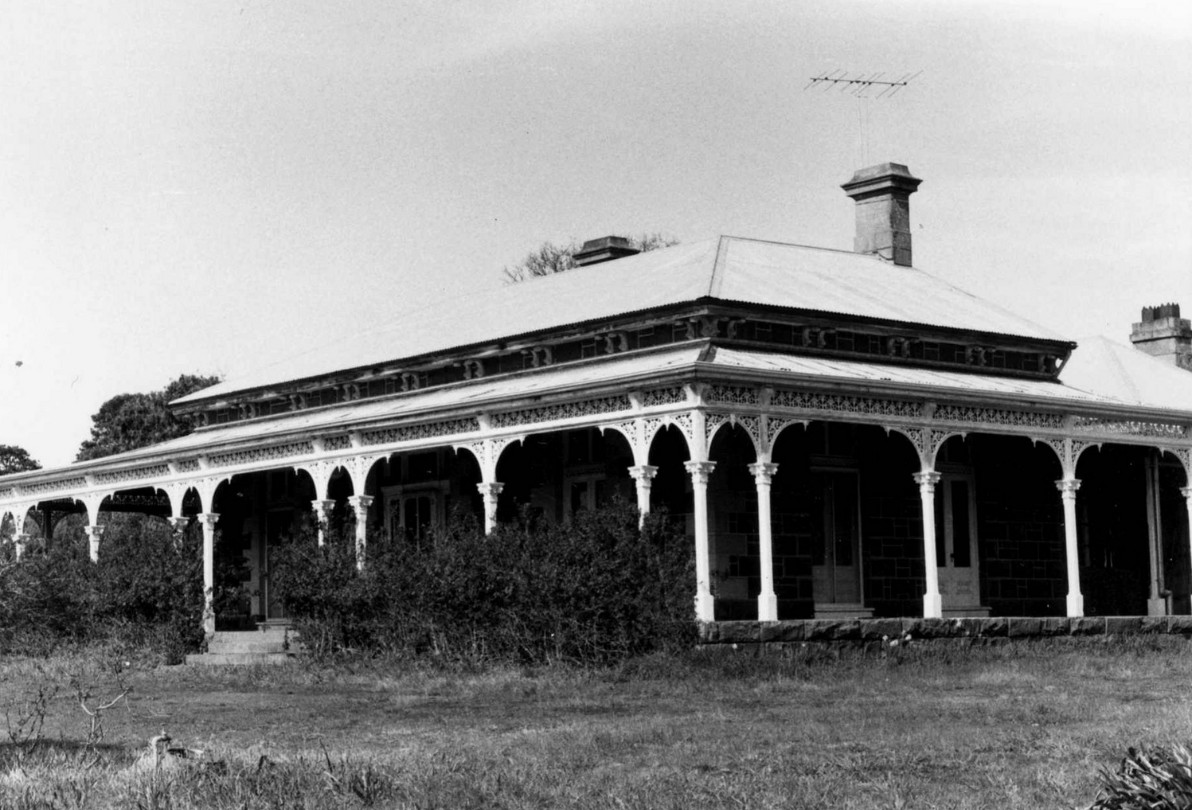
The homestead

After approximately two decades of ownership, Martin sold Mount Sturgeon to Hugh Glass, an Irish-born squatter, merchant and land speculator. By the early 1860s Glass controlled extensive pastoral interests across south-eastern Australia and was reputedly among the wealthiest men in Victoria. However, a combination of drought, falling stock values and financial overextension undermined his pastoral empire. As his financial position deteriorated, several of his properties were sold or subdivided, including Mount Sturgeon. Glass' subsequent political and financial downfall culminated in bankruptcy, imprisonment and declining health before his death in 1871.

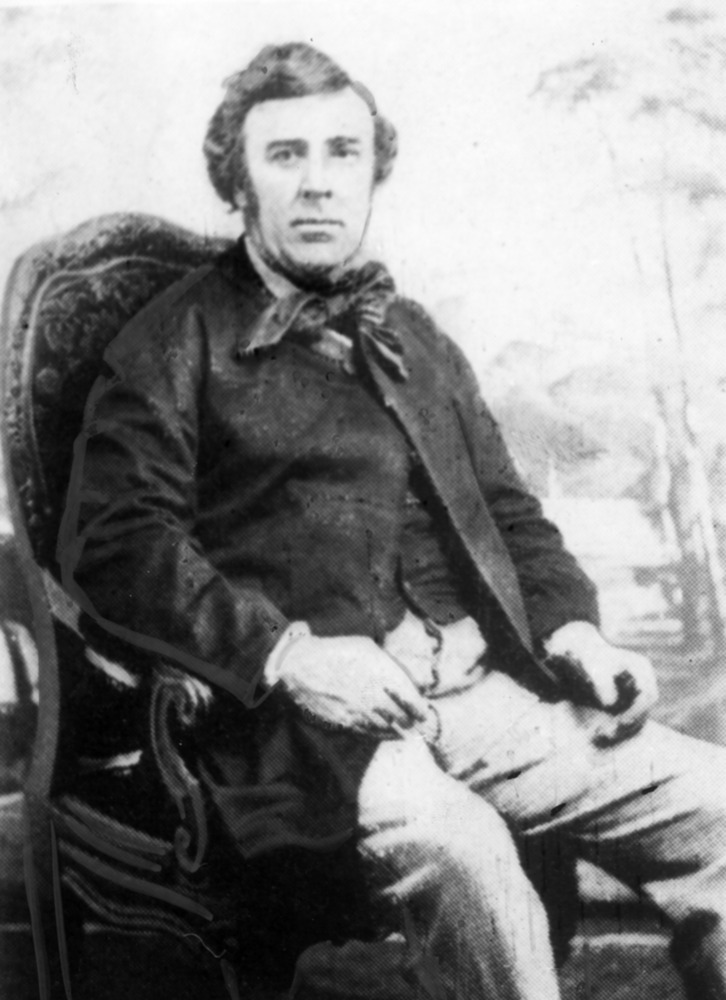
Hugh Glass

In 1863, the homestead portion of Mount Sturgeon was acquired by Charles Henry Armytage and his brother-in-law George Fairbairn. The Armytage family, whose pastoral interests extended across much of western Victoria, as well as Como House in Melbourne, developed Mount Sturgeon as their principal farm station. At the time the property comprised approximately 28,000 acres (11,340 ha), carrying around 30,000 sheep and 300 cattle. Station records indicate that approximately 130 workers were employed in various capacities, including shepherds, boundary riders, stockmen, cooks, tradesmen and labourers. Wool production formed the economic basis of the property, with annual wool sales generating substantial revenue.

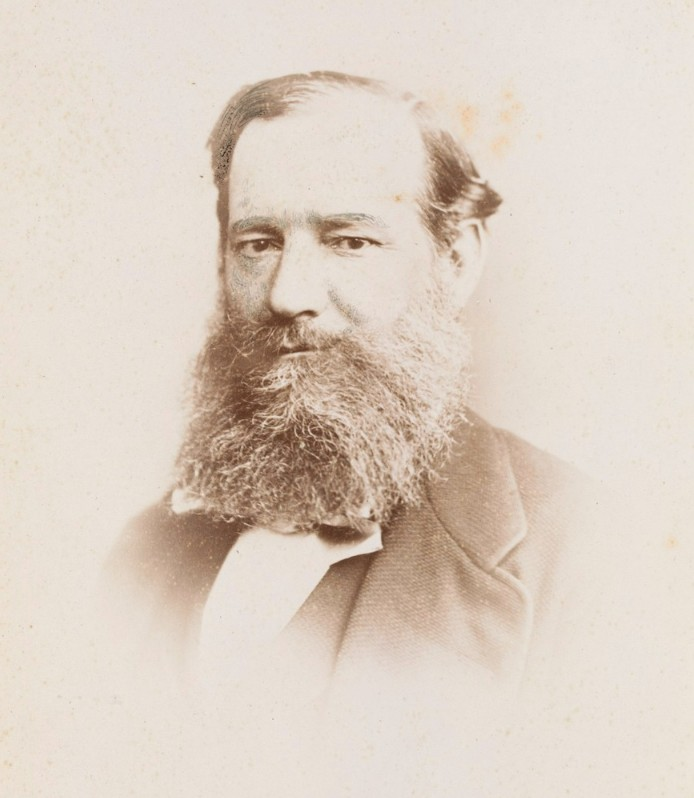
Charles Henry Armytage

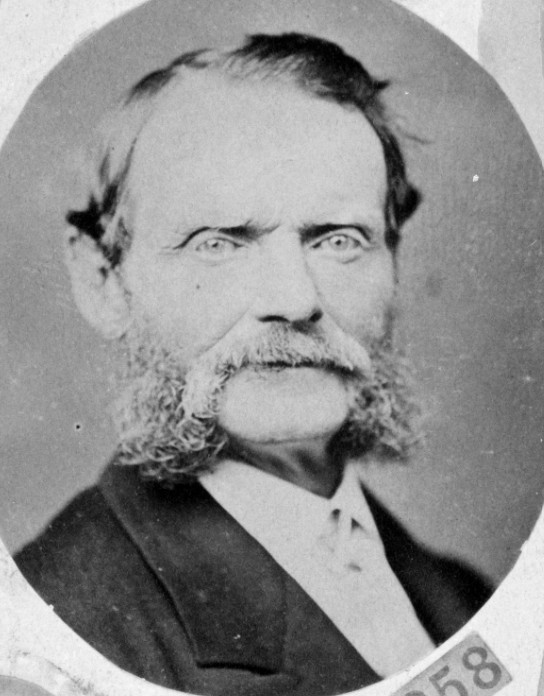
George Fairbairn

During the 1860s and 1870s the Armytage family substantially expanded and remodelled the homestead. The principal addition was a large bluestone wing containing formal reception and dining rooms. The design has been attributed to architect Arthur Ebden Johnson, a relative of Caroline Armytage who was active in both Melbourne and the Western District. Other station buildings, including the woolshed, workers' cottages, cookhouse and sheep dip, were progressively enlarged or improved as Mount Sturgeon developed into one of the leading pastoral properties of the district.

Like many large Victorian pastoral runs, Mount Sturgeon was affected by the land selection legislation of the 1860s and 1870s. Large portions of the leasehold estate were opened for agricultural settlement and acquired by selectors, resulting in the fragmentation of the original run. Despite these losses, the Armytage family retained the homestead and a substantial surrounding estate. Following Charles Armytage's death in 1876, management of the family's pastoral interests passed to his widow Caroline and later to their children.

In 1885 management of Mount Sturgeon was assumed by Harold Armytage, the third son of Charles and Caroline Armytage. During his tenure portions of the surrounding country were reacquired and the station continued as a significant sheep-grazing enterprise. Accounts records that approximately 25,000 sheep were shorn annually. Mount Sturgeon also served as a social centre for the district, and regularly hosted visitors from Melbourne and elsewhere in Victoria, which at this stage had a nine-hole golf course and hunting ground.

On Boxing Day, 1900, a fire which started on the property managed to jump the Hamilton Highway, and travel south toward the nearby property of Devon Park.

Sir Reginald Talbot, the 11th Governor of Victoria, was hosted at the property, who then went on to visit Hamilton.

On 11 January 1911, the Armytage's also hosted Lord Carmichael, the 12th Governor of Victoria, who was on the return journey from further west, where he had attended several engagements.

On Tuesday 22 April 1924, he hosted the Earl of Stradbroke, the 15th Governor of Victoria, who was in the district to attend a town-naming ceremony.

On Friday 9 March 1934, 400 acres of the property were burnt in a large bushfire. Later that same month on Sunday 25 March 1934, John Cameron, the station manager at the time, was found shot dead in one of the outbuildings at the homestead.

Whilst a portion of the property was sold off earlier in 1909, the vast majority of the property remained in Armytage ownership until after the Second World War. In 1948 Mount Sturgeon and the nearby Fulham estate, also under their ownership, were acquired by the Victorian Government under the Soldier Settlement Scheme. The estate, then comprising approximately 27,000 acres, was subdivided into around 30 farms which were allocated to returned servicemen. The homestead and associated buildings were retained as a separate holding.

Former Royal Australian Air Force pilot Peter Charles Armytage received one of the settlement allotments and named his property "Caviar", with Charlie Rochfort receiving the main homestead allotment. In 1970 members of the Armytage family reacquired part of the former homestead property, maintaining a connection with the estate despite its subdivision. In 1999, the homestead, outbuildings and surrounding land were purchased by Melbourne barrister Allan Myers.

== See also ==
- Como House
