= Wormbete =

Historic homestead in Victoria, Australia

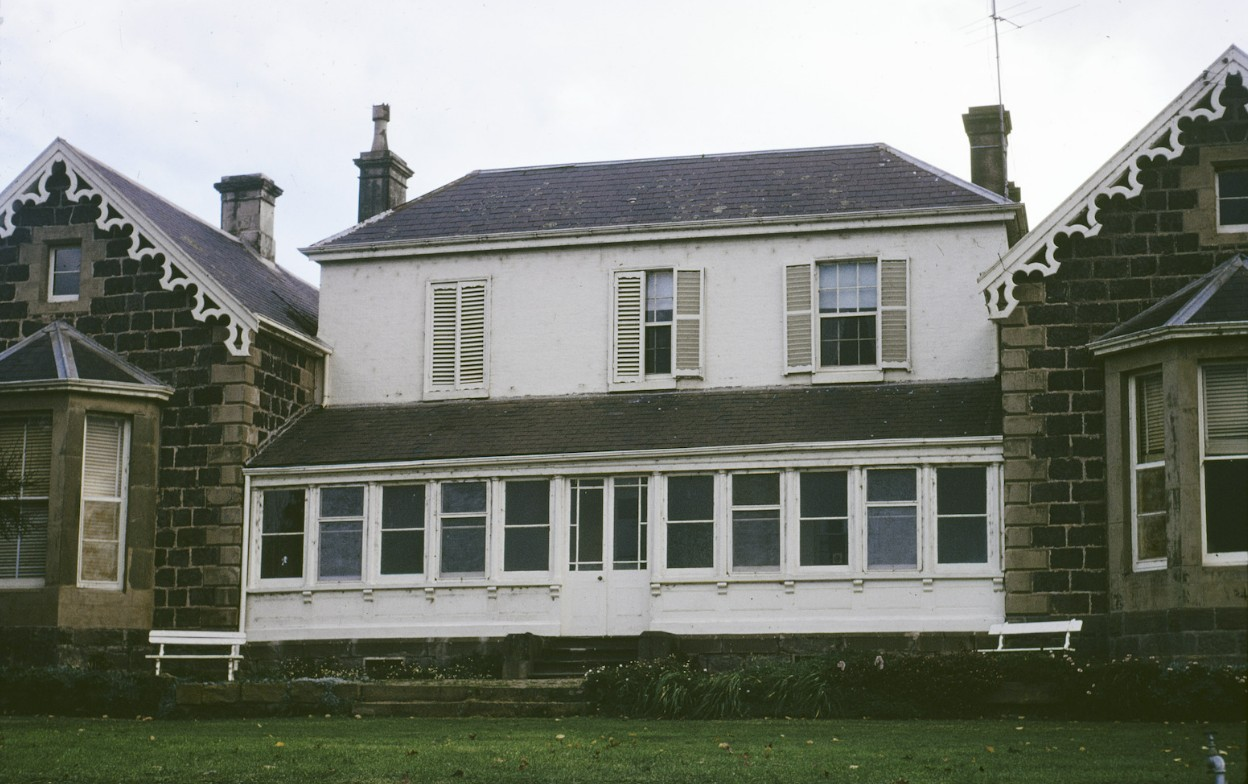
- Wormbete Homestead, 1970

- Location in Surf Coast Shire, Victoria
- 38°17′38″S 143°59′23″E
- Type: Homestead, associated built facilities and grounds
- Location: Winchelsea, Victoria, Australia
- Nearest city: Geelong

History
- Built: ~1840s (original homestead), ~1860s (wing additions)
- Built for: Henry Hopkins

Site notes
- Architectural style: Victorian Gothic

Victorian Heritage Register
- Official name: Wormbete Homestead
- Type: State heritage (built and natural)
- Designated: 15 December 1977
- Reference no.: 69773

Wormbete is a historic pastoral property located approximately 5 km south of Winchelsea in Victoria, Australia. It was established in the early colonial period and developed into one of the significant sheep stations of the Western District. The property is closely associated with the Hopkins family, who owned and managed it for nearly 140 years. Wormbete is also notable for its homestead complex, which contains building phases dating from the 1840s onward, and is recognised for its unusual courtyard-style layout and early colonial architectural features.

== History ==
European settlement of the area surrounding Wormbete began roughly around 1837–1839, when Henry Hopkins took up land in the district, making it one of the earliest pastoral runs in the Winchelsea region. Wormbete is said to mean "lake with a black fellow's mound" in the local Wathaurong language, and the run was also historically known as Wurdee Boluc.

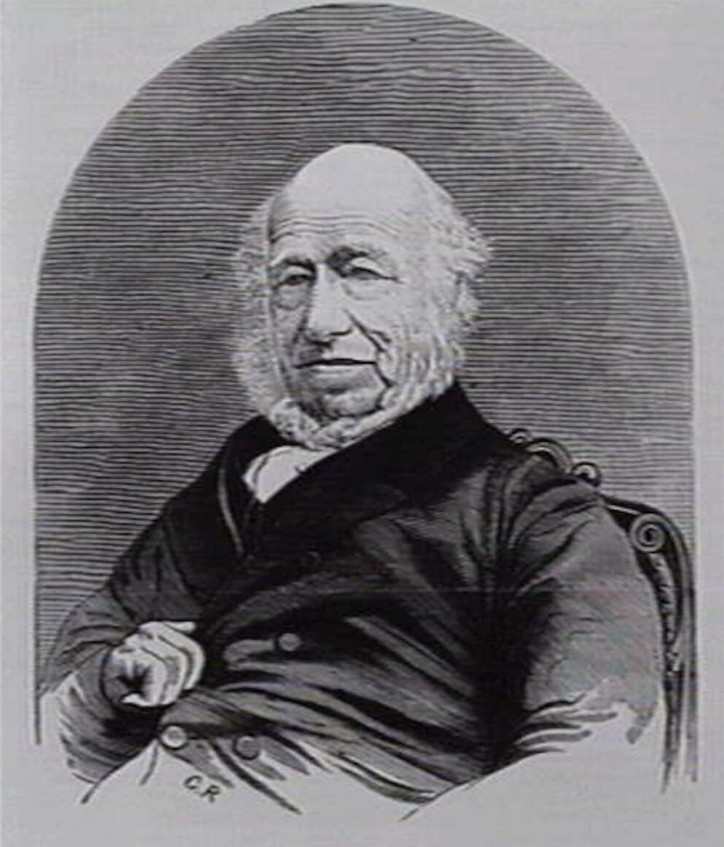
Henry Hopkins

Henry Hopkins had emigrated from England to Van Diemen's Land in 1822, where he became a successful wool trader and pastoral agent. He is described as an early pioneer of the Australian wool industry and was among the first to export Tasmanian wool to Britain, building a profitable commercial network linking colonial pastoral production with London markets.

Despite his business interests, Henry Hopkins spent relatively little time at Wormbete itself, or his other Victorian properties (including Murdeduke), instead delegating management of his pastoral holdings to his sons while he remained largely based in Tasmania. His broader civic involvement included close association with the Independent (Congregational) Church and participation in early Melbourne ecclesiastical history, including laying foundation stones for one of the city's earliest churches, on the site of the present-day St Michael's Uniting Church.

The early Wormbete run operated as a large, loosely managed pastoral estate typical of early Victorian settlement. It initially functioned primarily as a cattle station, with stocks used for hides and tallow. In these early decades, fencing was absent and livestock roamed widely across surrounding districts.

By 1851, John Rout Hopkins, Henry Hopkins' second son, had assumed formal control of Wormbete, overseeing approximately 31,000 acres of pastoral land. He also held additional land through a pre-emptive right, including the neighbouring St Stephen's Estate.

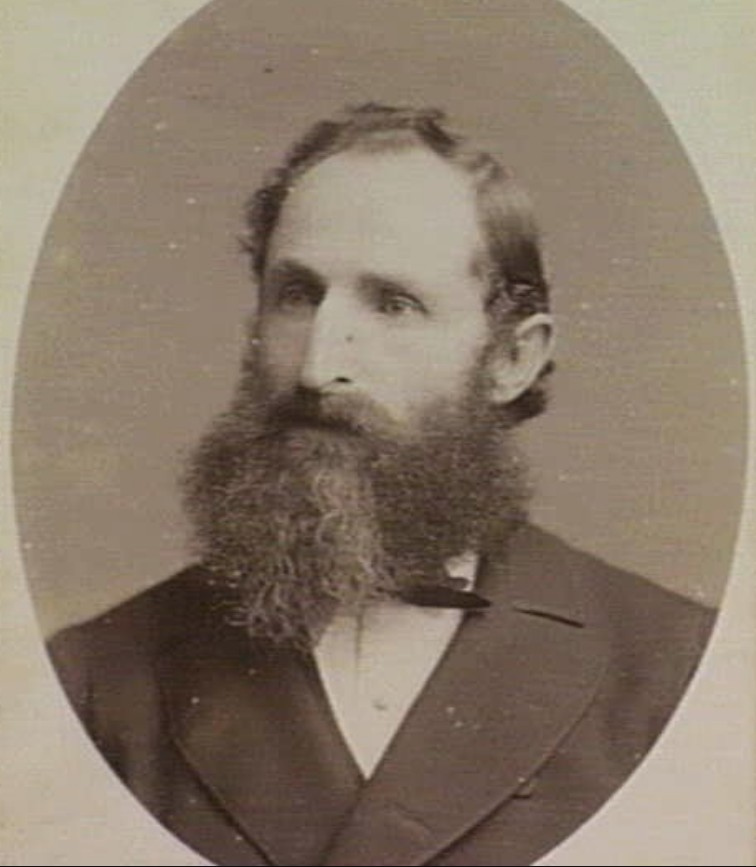
John Rout Hopkins

A bluestone homestead had already been constructed on the property in the 1840s, and during the 1850s and 1860s additional outbuildings were added, many of which survive today alongside the original structures. The homestead precinct was laid out in a formal farm-court arrangement, a design more commonly associated with earlier English and Tasmanian colonial farm planning than with later Victorian pastoral architecture, with this layout being considered unusual in Victoria.

During the mid-nineteenth century, John Rout Hopkins gradually transformed Wormbete from a cattle run into a sheep station. Drawing on experience from Van Diemen's Land, he introduced carefully selected Merino stock, establishing a distinctive "Wormbete type" of sheep. The shift to sheep farming was accompanied by significant landscape modification. Fencing was introduced to control stock movement and a system of paddocks, dams, and tanks was constructed to improve water access and land management. Timber was progressively cleared, although some shelter belts were retained. An account in The Pastoralists Review described the transformation of the landscape from heavily timbered country, featuring large numbers of wild cherry trees, into more open pastoral land through both natural and artificial clearing processes.

At its peak, Wormbete supported large-scale wool production, with the largest annual shearing reportedly reaching 26,000 sheep. The estate also became increasingly self-sufficient, with extensive gardens, orchards, and onsite food production supporting the homestead.

John Rout Hopkins was also active in public life, serving in multiple political and civic roles. He held seats in the Victorian Legislative Assembly across several periods, served as mayor of Geelong, was the first president of the Barrabool Shire Council, and served as a councilor in the Winchelsea district for over three decades. He was also involved in regional sporting and civic organisations.

John married Eliza Anne Armytage, daughter of George Armytage of the neighbouring Ingleby Estate. Together they raised a large family at Wormbete, comprising 7 daughters and 6 sons. After John Rout Hopkins' death in 1897, the estate passed to his son Walter.

Following Walter's death in 1944, Wormbete was divided between his sons. One son, Henry, inherited the homestead and part of the estate, while another, John, inherited the remaining land, which he renamed Burong Station. The homestead continued to be occupied by Henry Hopkins (junior) and his family until the late twentieth century.

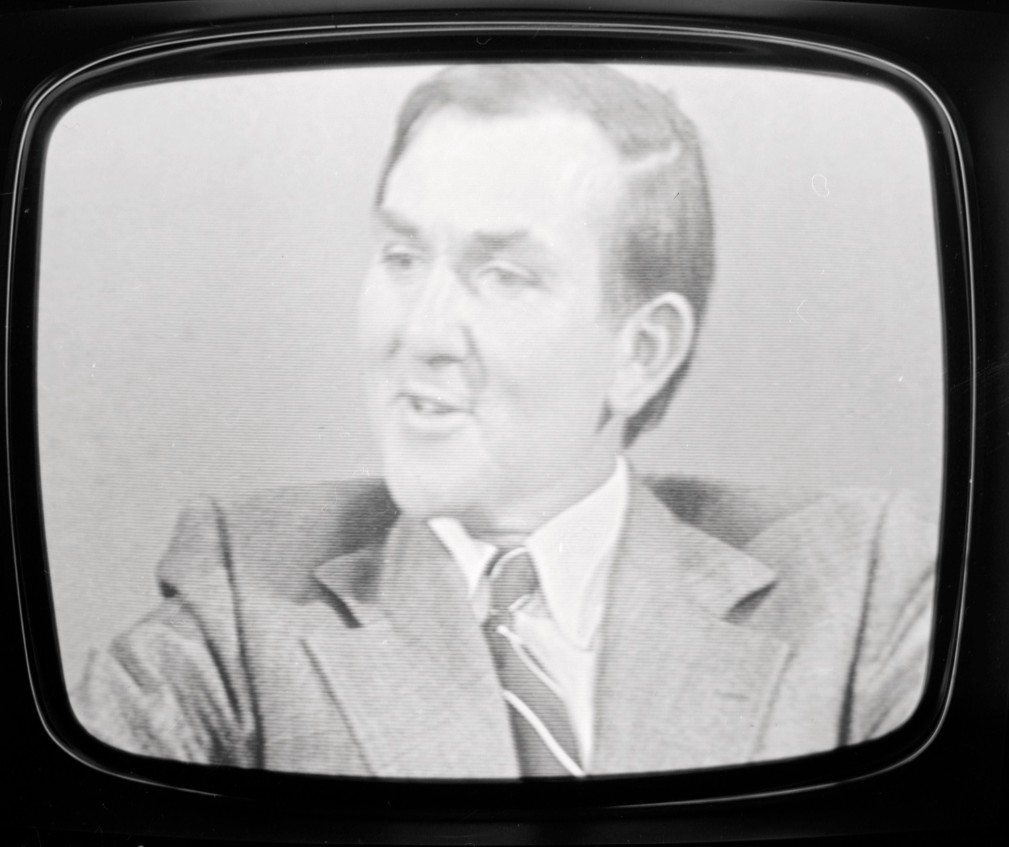
Henry Hopkins (junior), 1975

In 1977, Wormbete was purchased by businessman Alan Bond and his wife Eileen, who undertook refurbishment works before the property briefly returned to the Hopkins family. In 1996–1997 it was again sold, to Thomas Blakely, marking the end of continuous Hopkins control, although the property has continued to operate as a mixed pastoral enterprise running sheep, cattle, and horses.

Wormbete was the setting for a 2014 episode of MasterChef Australia, and has since hosted events for the Barwon Hunt Club, a local fox hunting club.

== Gallery ==
Wormbete Homestead
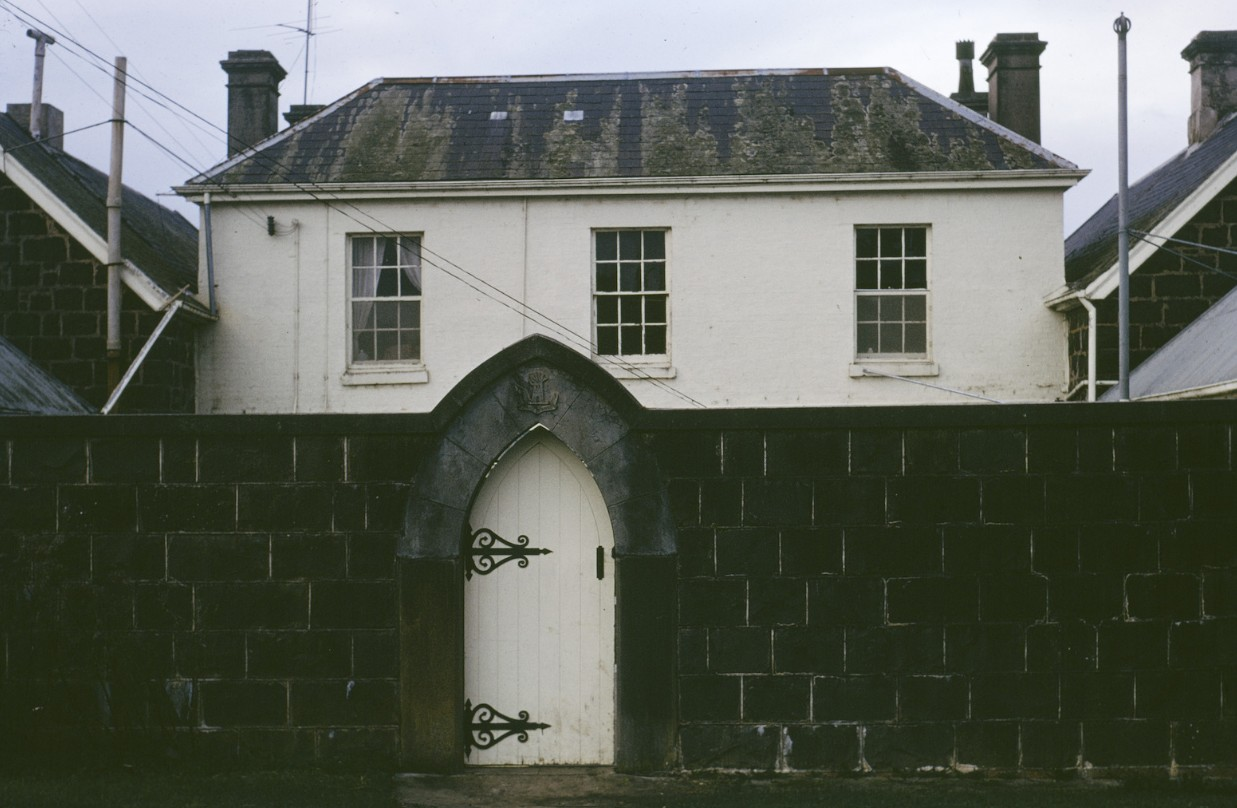
The rear of the homestead

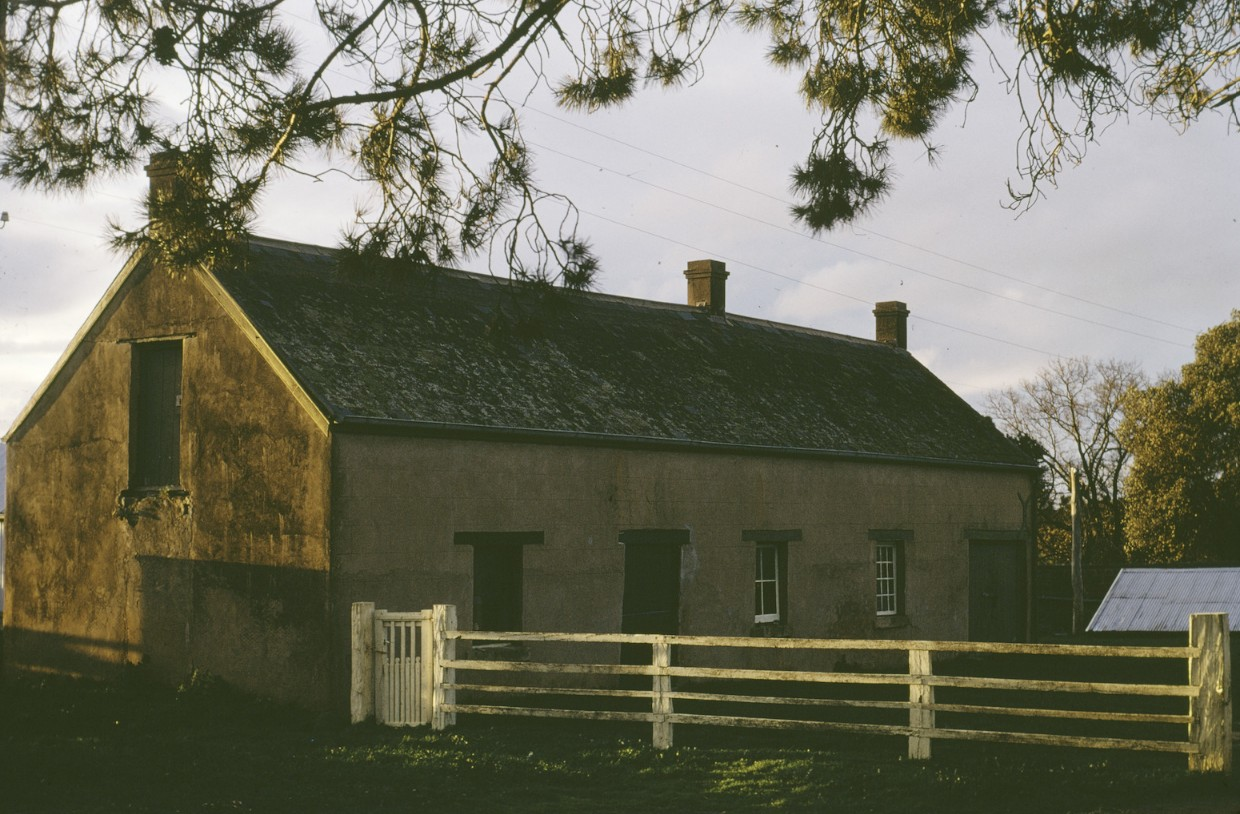
Outbuildings

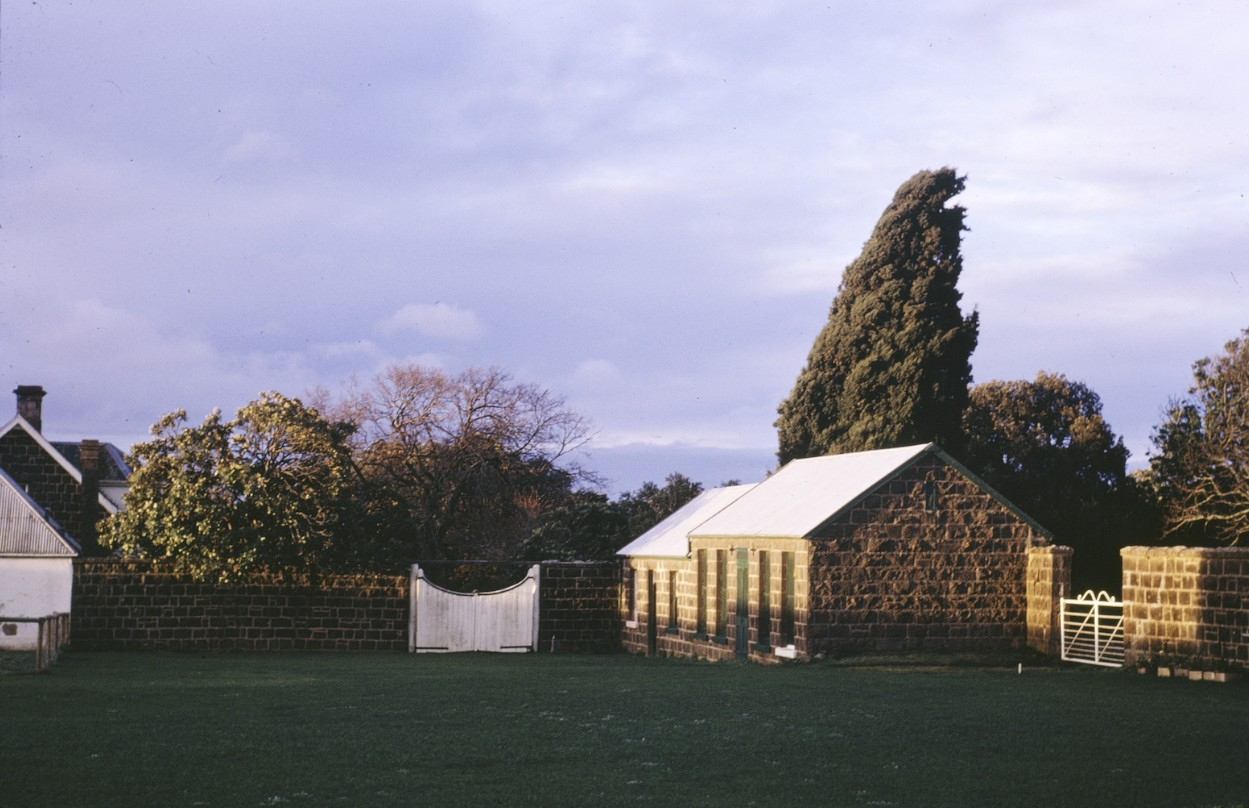
Outbuildings

== See also ==
- Barwon Park
- Ingleby
- Murdeduke
