= Glenelg River =

Glenelg River may refer to:

- Glenelg River (Victoria), which briefly crosses the border to South Australia.
- Glenelg River (Western Australia)
