= National Trust of Australia (Victoria) =

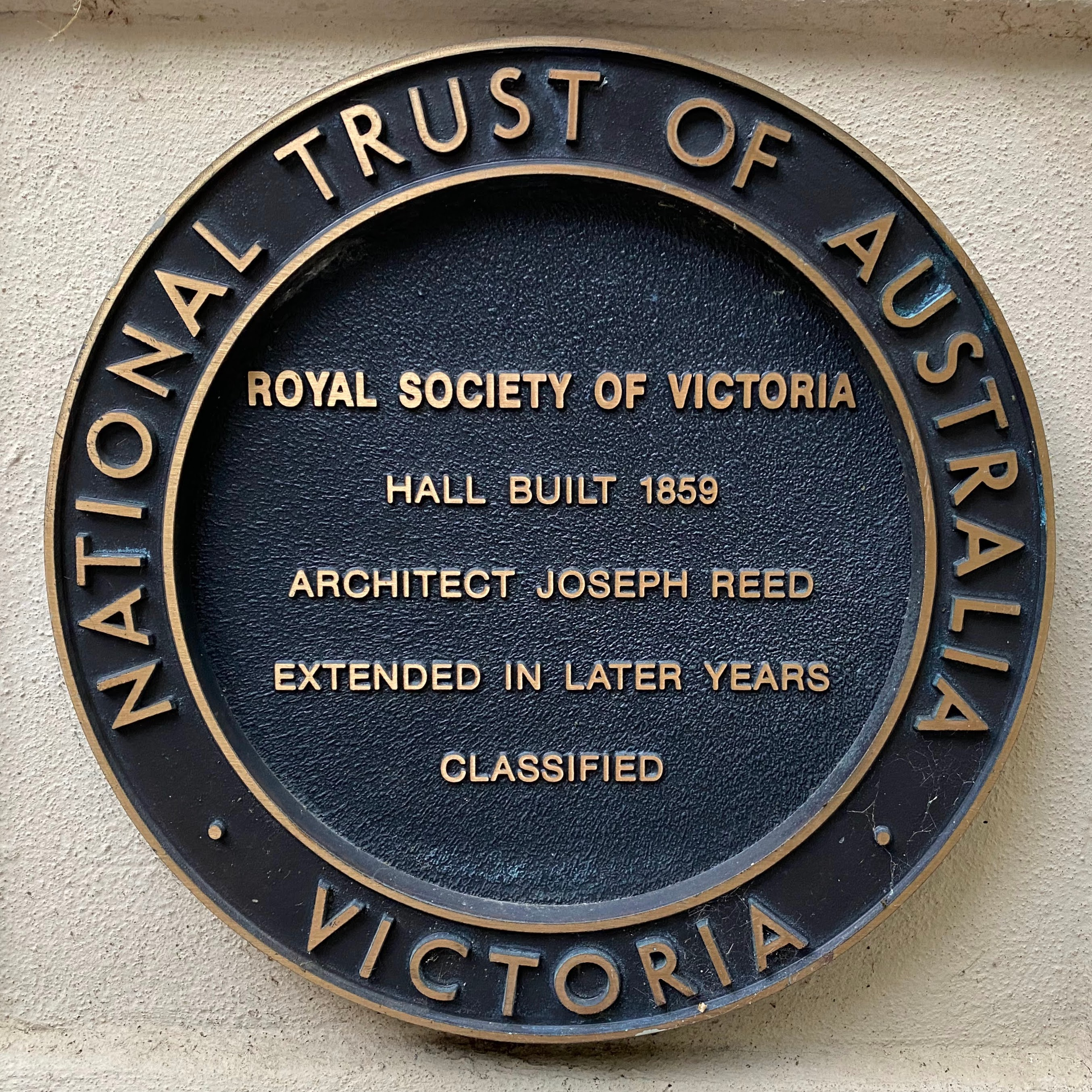
A plaque of the National Trust of Australia (Victoria) in Melbourne

The National Trust of Australia (Victoria) is a community-based, non-government organisation committed to promoting and conserving Australia's indigenous, natural and historic heritage places of cultural significance in Victoria. It was founded in 1956 and is a member organisation of the National Trust of Australia.

== Establishment ==
With threats to fine colonial mansions in Sydney, the first National Trust in Australia was established in New South Wales in 1945. In Victoria, where the heritage of ornate late-19th century Land Boom buildings was less valued, it took some time for heritage advocates to organise. In 1953, the publication of the popular Early Melbourne Architecture 1840-1888, by artist, writer, and public speaker Maie Casey, was an early attempt at raising awareness.

In the following months, major figures in Melbourne, from society, the arts, town planning and architecture, began to discuss the setting up of Trust similar to that in Britain and NSW. Spurred by the demolition of the spectacular 1870 mansion,"Wendrew", in Toorak in 1954, and the likely imminent sale of the nearby grand colonial estate Como House, a series of ever-larger meetings were held, culminating in the formation in May 1956 of the National Trust of Australia (Victoria), as a charity with its first aim being the acquisition of Como. A notable feature of those who established the Trust was the number of prominent and influential people, and "the close network of family and business between them". They included author Joan, her husband Daryl Lindsay, the director of the National Gallery of Victoria, R.T.M. Pescott, director of the Museum of Victoria, architect and critic Robin Boyd, Maie Casey and her husband politician Richard Casey, Noel and Elizabeth Goss, architect Roy Simpson, and Professor of Architecture at the University of Melbourne, Brian Lewis. Early patrons included Sir Dallas Brooks and Lady Brooks, Sir Owen Dixon, Lord Baillieu, Lady Grimwade and Lady Murdoch.

== Properties ==
The Victorian National Trust manages 38 properties in the state, 30 of which it owns and eight of which are properties on Crown land. 24 National Trust properties are regularly open to the public. The most well known include the historic Old Melbourne Gaol, the Melbourne Maritime Museum in Southbank, which includes the restored sailing ship, Polly Woodside, the historic mansion and gardens of the Rippon Lea Estate in Elsternwick, and Como House in Toorak.

== See also ==
- List of National Trust properties in Australia
- List of Australian Living Treasures
- SAHANZ, the Society of Architectural Historians, Australia and New Zealand
