= Como House =

Historic house in Victoria, Australia

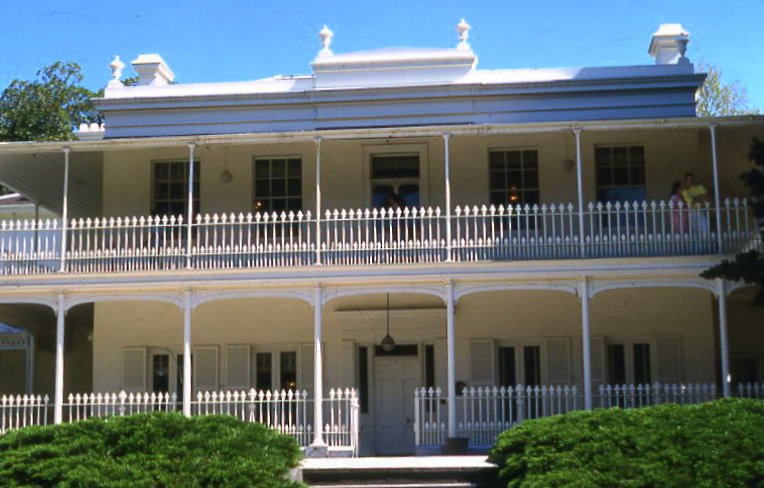
- Interactive map of the Como House area

General information
- Type: House
- Architectural style: Victorian Regency
- Location: 16 Como Avenue, South Yarra, Melbourne, Victoria, Australia
- Current tenants: National Trust of Australia (Victoria)
- Completed: 1847, 1855 & 1874 (later additions)
- Client: Sir Edward Eyre Williams (1847)

Website
- Como House and Garden - National Trust

Victorian Heritage Register
- Official name: Como House
- Type: Natural and cultural heritage register
- Designated: 9 October 1974
- Reference no.: H0205
- Heritage Overlay number: HO26

Como House is a historical house, with associated gardens in the City of Stonnington, Victoria, Australia. It was constructed in 1847 for Sir Edward Eyre Williams and now serves as a tourist attraction under the custodianship of the National Trust of Australia. The gardens are open Monday to Saturday from 9:00 a.m. to 5:00 p.m. and Sunday from 10:00 a.m. to 5:00 p.m. The historic house is open for guided tours every Saturday and Sunday.

== Location ==
The house and landscaped area is located in the suburb of South Yarra, Victoria, adjacent to Como Park.

== History ==
Como House was built in 1847 for Edward Eyre Williams, later a prominent judge in the Supreme Court of Victoria. The house was constructed in the Italianate style and was later expanded in the 1850s and 1870s. It was purchased in 1872 by Charles Armytage, a wealthy pastoralist, and remained in the Armytage family until 1959, when it was acquired by the National Trust. Since its construction, Como House has been a significant venue for Melbourne’s society events, hosting stylish entertainment for the city’s elite.

Como House was constructed in 1847 and owned by Sir Edward Eyre Williams, then a lawyer, until it was sold in 1852 to investor Frederick Dalgety. After only a year, it was sold to John Brown – a master builder and wine and spirit merchant – who took possession in 1853 and commenced a program of works to transform the property, including adding a second storey (which included a ballroom) to the house.

In December 1855, William Sangster was appointed head gardener and overseer at Como. At that time, the 53-acre site comprised partly cleared land, a rocky hill and a swamp adjoining the river. The site was bounded to the north by Gardener’s Creek Road (now Toorak Road) down to the Yarra River and extended west from Williams Road to the vicinity of Kensington Road. Sangster designed and laid out the five-acre formal pleasure gardens section of the grounds with exotic trees to create an ideal “picturesque garden” with borrowed views across the river. The design featured a carriage drive from the main road. Large areas were set aside for almond trees, vegetables and fruit. In 1864, Brown's borrowings for his business were secured with a mortgage of Como and other properties to the Bank of Australasia. When he had business difficulties following the death of his business partner, Brown’s bank was sold to the Armytages in 1864; Sangster remained until mid-1866.

Charles Armytage, a pastoralist and son of George, purchased the property for £14,000 in 1864, and Como served as the family's Melbourne home for 95 years, eventually selling the property to the newly-formed Victorian branch of the National Trust in 1959.

The Seekers filmed the video for their version of Morningtown Ride at Como House.

Improvements to the property continued in the 1980s.
