= Fulham Homestead =

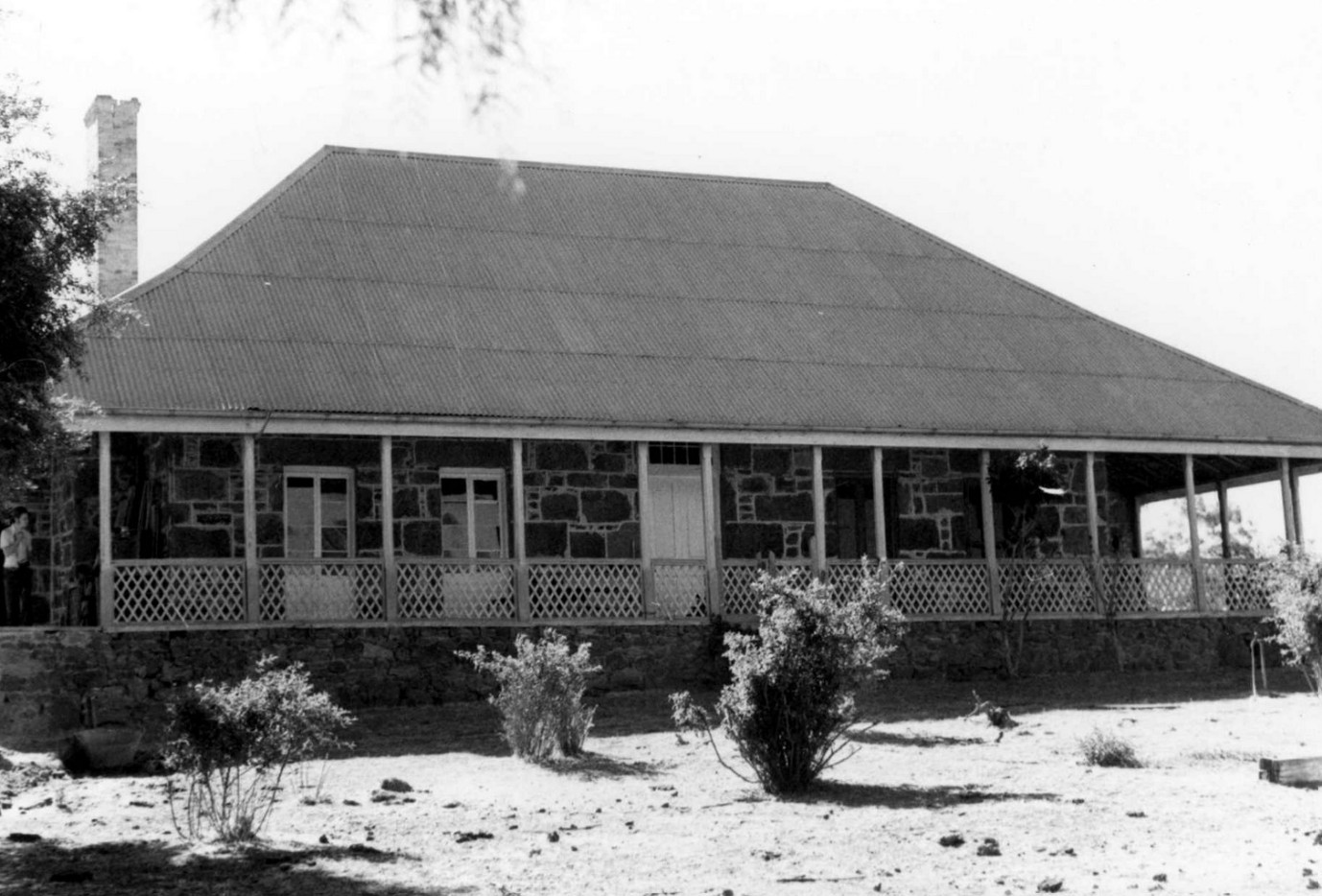
- Fulham Homestead, 1970
- Interactive map of the Fulham Homestead area

General information
- Location: 29 Walcott Road, Kanagulk Victoria, Australia
- Coordinates: 37°08′40″S 141°51′25″E
- Completed: 1840s

Website
- Fulham Homestead

Fulham Homestead is a historic homestead in the western district of Victoria, Australia. During the period of early land settlement in Victoria, the Fulham run of 67,000 acres was taken up in 1838 by Francis Desailly on behalf of Sir John Owen of England. Sir John never visited Fulham and in 1847 he sold the property to George Armytage for 6,000 pounds.

The homestead and outbuildings at Fulham were built between 1841 and 1846. The main construction material is iron stone quarried from the property, Walls are double stone with a rubble filled cavity making the walls about 2 feet thick. The property is essentially as originally built and has been designated a historic site with State level significance.
