= Winchelsea, Victoria =

Winchelsea
- Town
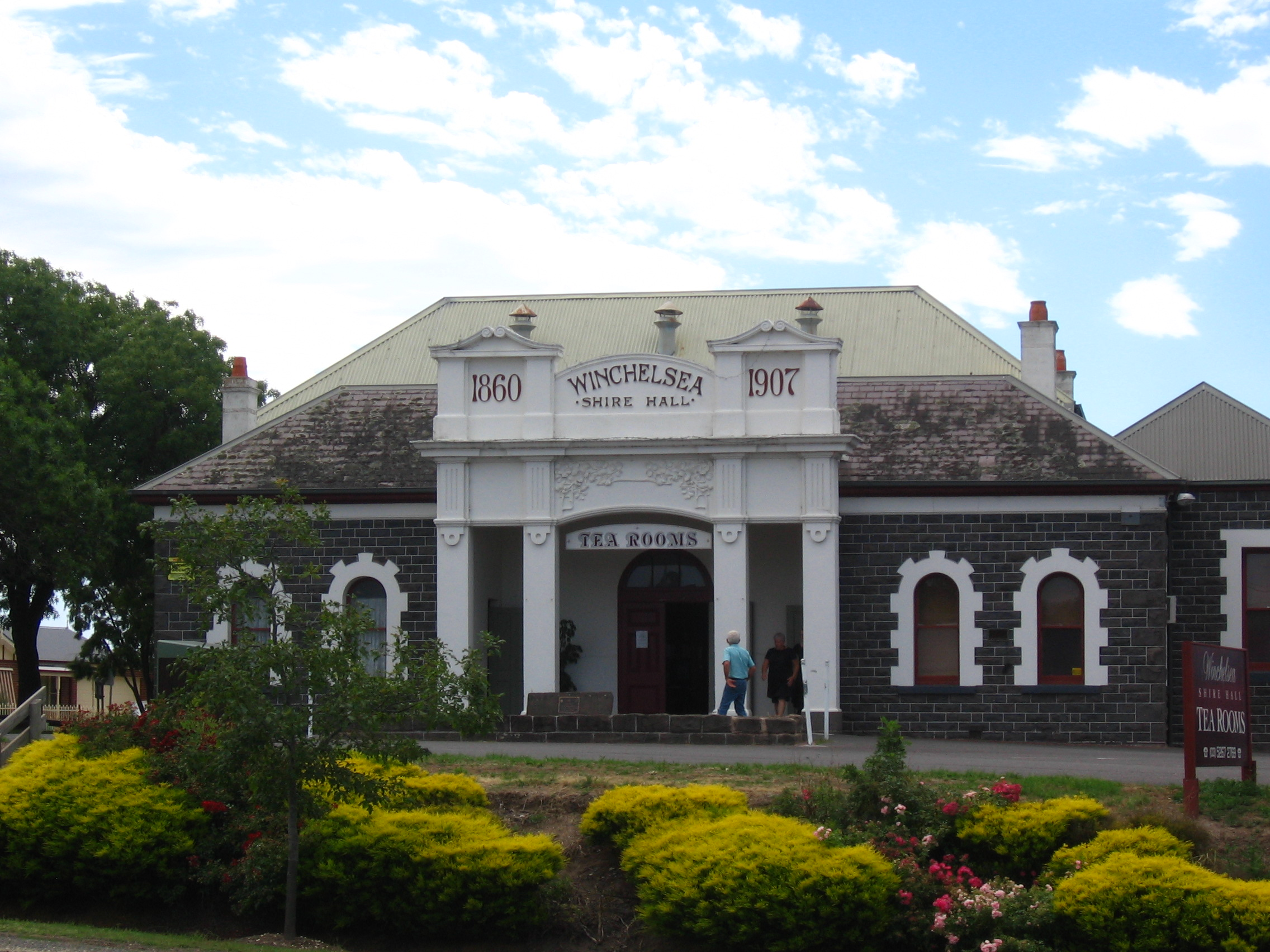
- Former town hall, now tea rooms

- Coordinates: 38°14′38″S 143°59′22″E
- Country: Australia
- State: Victoria
- LGA: Surf Coast Shire
- Location: 110 km (68 mi) from Melbourne; 37 km (23 mi) from Geelong; 38 km (24 mi) from Colac; 83 km (52 mi) from Ballarat

Government
  - State electorate: Polwarth
  - Federal division: Wannon

Population
  - Total: 2,032 (UCL 2021)
- Postcode: 3241
Localities around Winchelsea
Ombersley	Inverleigh	Inverleigh
Ombersley	Winchelsea	Buckley
Birregurra	Winchelsea South	Wurdiboluc

Winchelsea (/ˈwɪntʃəlsiː/ WINCH-əl-sea) (sometimes colloquially known as Winch) is a town in Victoria, Australia. The town is located in the Surf Coast Shire local government area, the suburb or locality of Winchelsea is predominantly within Surf Coast Shire with a small section within the Colac Otway Shire. Winchelsea is located on the Barwon River 115 km south-west of Melbourne and close to Geelong (37 km north-east).

== History ==
The first Europeans to reside in the area were squatters who established grazing runs there from as early as 1837, including Thomas Austin. Thomas Austin migrated from Tasmania and occupied the present day site of Winchelsea in 1837. The area was then called Austin's Ford. Austin built up his estate of Barwon Park to 29,000 acres (12,000 ha), including a mansion which still stands today.

The town developed around the Barwon Inn, established in 1842 by Prosper Nicholas Trebeck and Charles Beal. An Anglican church and school were established in 1846. The Post Office opened as Barwon on 1 July 1848 and was renamed Winchelsea in 1854. The town was the administrative centre of the Shire of Winchelsea, which was proclaimed in 1864, and which continued until 9 March 1994 when it was amalgamated with the Shire of Barrabool to become the Surf Coast Shire.

On 3 December 1867, the Barwon River bridge was officially opened by Prince Alfred, Duke of Edinburgh, during his visit to the area. Constructed by James Sinclair at a cost of £4,602, the three-span bluestone arch bridge replaced an earlier timber crossing built in 1849.

The railway through the town was opened in 1876, as part of the line to the south west of the state. The local railway station is served by V/Line passenger services on the Warrnambool line.

Winchelsea Magistrates' Court closed on 1 October 1984.

== Places of interest ==
- Barwon Hotel (1842) with a collection of historical artefacts.
- Old Shire Hall
- Barwon River Bridge – Opened by Prince Alfred, Duke of Edinburgh, on 3 December 1867
- Barwon Park Mansion – Built 1871
- The Globe Theatre

== Heritage listed sites ==
Winchelsea contains a number of heritage listed sites, including:

- 105 Inverleigh-Winchelsea Road, Barwon Park
- Princes Highway, Barwon River Bridge
- 70 Hopkins Street, Eastern Reserve Memorial Grandstand and Gates
- 17–19 Willis Street, Globe Theatre
- 765 Ingleby Road, Ingleby Homestead

== Sport ==
The town has an Australian Rules football team competing in the Geelong & District Football League.

The Winchelsea Golf Club is located between Lorne Road and Lauders Lane. The course is popular with locals and tourists alike.

The Winchelsea Cricket Club, formed in 1858 is one of the oldest sporting clubs in Victoria and currently compete in the Bellarine Peninsula Cricket Association

== Notable people ==
- Elizabeth Phillips Harding (1821–1910) a pioneer settler at Winchelsea who was a philanthropist noted for her endowment towards setting up The Austin Hospital in Melbourne in 1882
- Thomas Austin (1815–1871) husband of Elizabeth Phillips Harding, he introduced rabbits into Australia.
- John Rout Hopkins (1828–1897) a pioneer settler at Winchelsea who served in local government and the Victorian government for many years
- Marjorie Lawrence, soprano, noted as an interpreter of Richard Wagner's operas, born at Deans Marsh, south of Winchelsea in 1907
- Denis Napthine MP (1952–) Premier of the State of Victoria
- Darcy Parish (1997–) AFL Footballer with the Essendon Bombers
- Albert Jacka VC, MC & Bar (1893–1932) Captain 14th Battalion AIF. First Australian to be decorated with the VC during the First World War.
- Charles Gordon Timms OBE MC (3 bars) (1884–1958) born at Mount Hesse Station. Highly decorated WWI Medical officer in British Army and played rugby for the British and Irish Lions on their 1910 tour of South Africa.
- Alex Boswell Timms (1872–1922) born at Mount Hesse Station. Played international rugby for Scotland (whom he captained against England) and was selected for the British Isles team on its 1899 tour of Australia. A trained Doctor and Surgeon.

== See also ==
- Winchelsea railway station, Victoria
