= Barwon Grange =

Historic house in Victoria, Australia

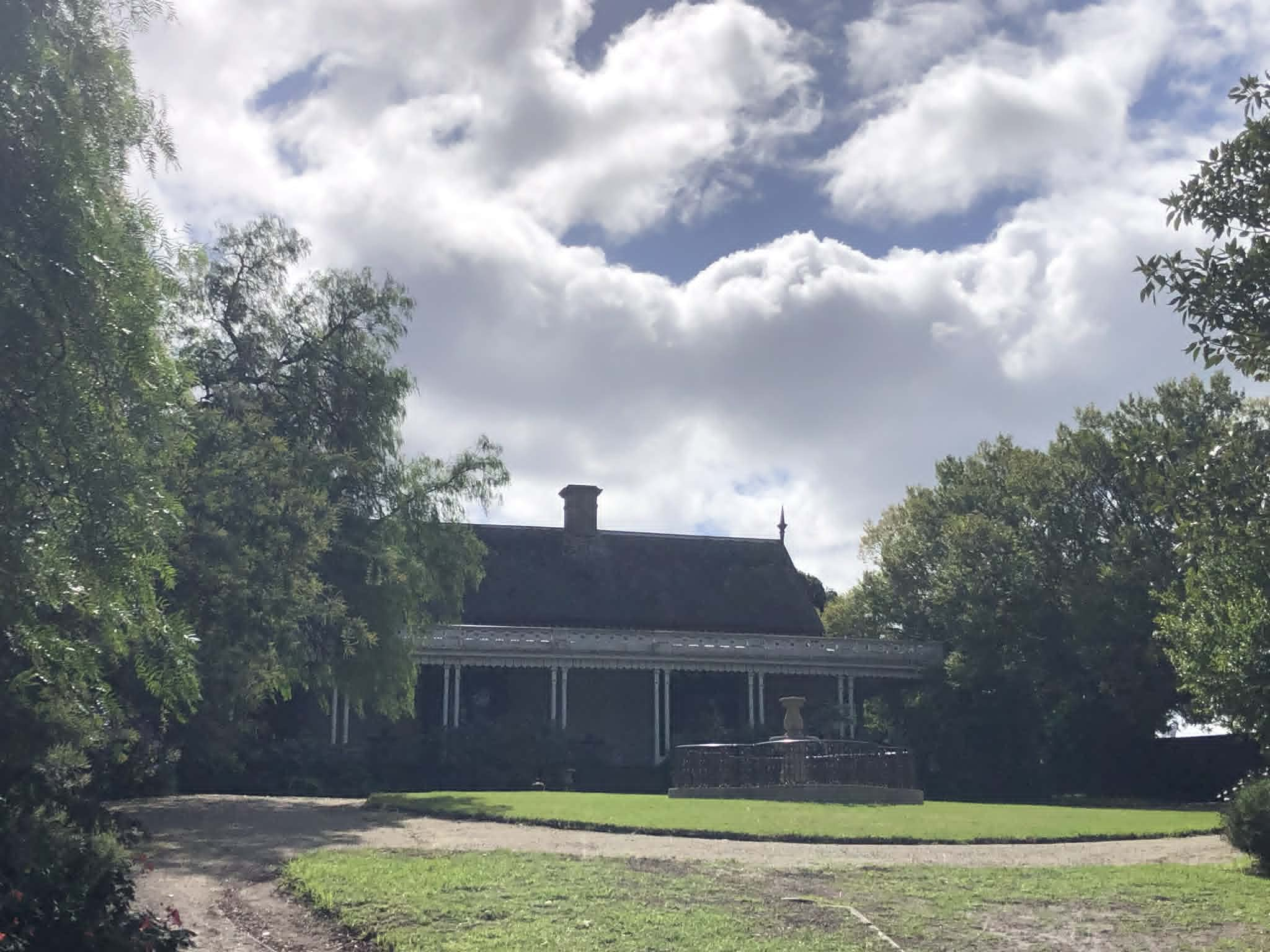
- Barwon Grange, Geelong

- Location in the City of Greater Geelong, Victoria
- 38°09′43″S 144°20′53″E
- Type: Homestead, associated built facilities and grounds
- Location: Newtown, Victoria, Australia

History
- Built: 1856
- Built for: Jonathan Porter O'Brien

Site notes
- Architect: Unknown
- Architectural style: Victorian Gothic

Victorian Heritage Register
- Official name: Barwon Grange
- Type: State heritage (built and natural)
- Designated: 14 September 1995
- Reference no.: H1102

Barwon Grange is a heritage-listed house and garden located in Newtown, a suburb of Geelong, Victoria, Australia. The present brick house was built in 1856, replacing an earlier timber house, and made for the prominent merchant Jonathan Porter O'Brien and his wife Ann. The house has subsequently been acquired by the National Trust of Australia (Victoria) and is run as a house museum.

== History ==
Jonathan and Ann married and promptly emigrated from Liverpool in 1848 and arrived in Melbourne and arrived late September 1849. Four months later, their 13 month old baby, Georgiana died. Not long after the death, the couple decided to move to Geelong. Between 1850 and 1853, they moved into a weatherboard cottage overlooking the Barwon River. Their third child, John Harry Potter, was the first to be born in the house, but lived only for 9 months. Their second child, Cunningham Porter, died at their previous house in Moorabool Street at the age of 14 months.

In 1856, work began on the present-day brick house, complete with 8 rooms, a coach-house, storage rooms and a garden. Furnishings in the house included damask curtains, Bohemian glass, mahogany furniture, a piano, a Minton ceramic chandelier and boardgames. The O'Brien family only lived in the house for a year, until Ann fell pregnant, and the couple decided to return to England. She gave birth to Percy Denny over there, and the family never returned.

The detached kitchen was built in 1871 and designed by architects Alexander Davidson and George Henderson, and the entrance gates were designed in 1885 for James Chandwick, a later occupant of the house.

The house was acquired by the National Trust in 1970, when the house was converted into a house museum, with guided tours by volunteers.

== See also ==
- Barwon Park
- Como House
- The Heights
