= St Thomas' Anglican Church, Winchelsea =

Anglican church in Winchelsea, Victoria, Australia

St Thomas' Anglican Church
- St Thomas' Church of England Church
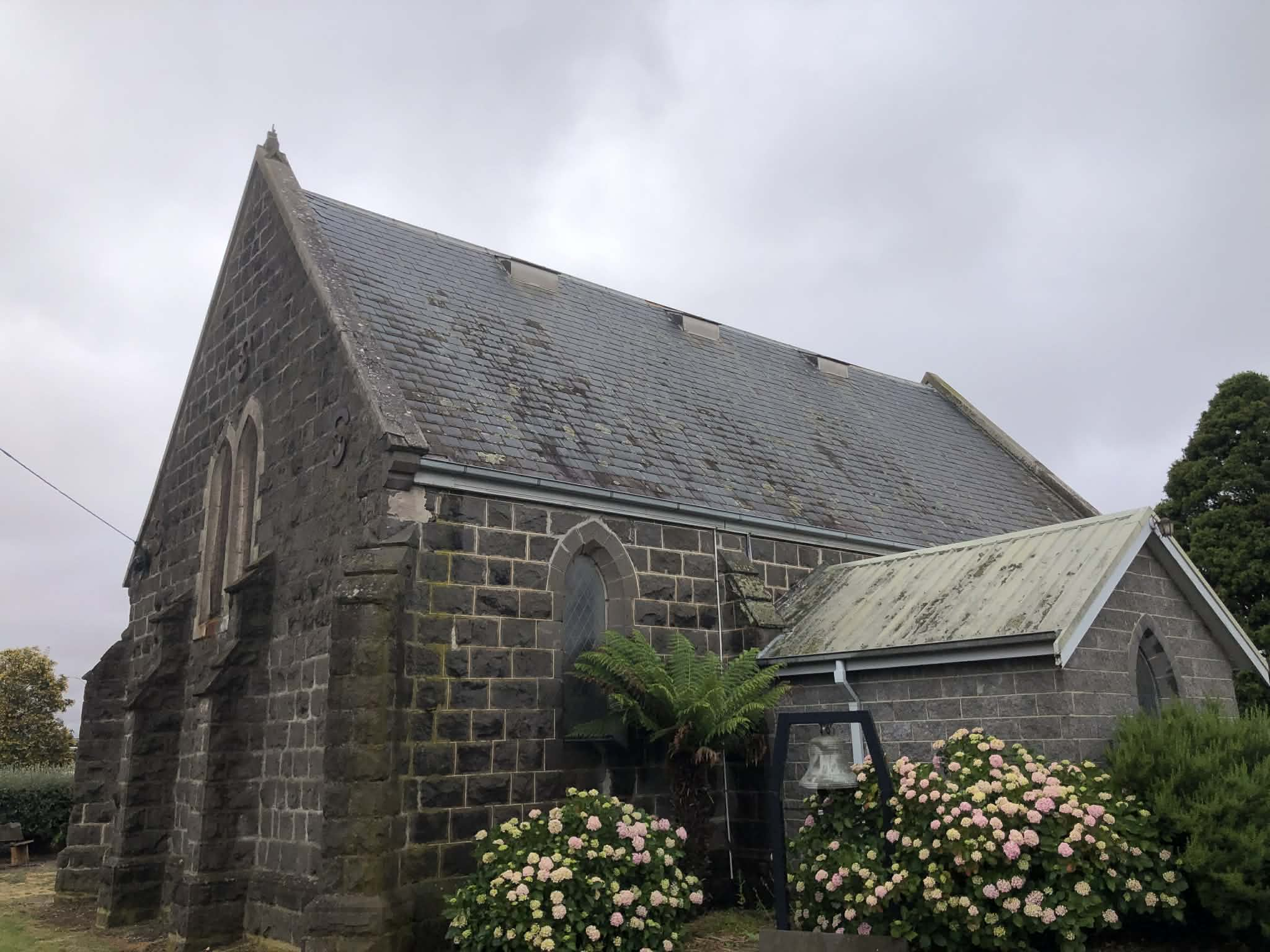
- St Thomas' Anglican Church, 2025
- St Thomas' Anglican Church
- 38°14′30″S 143°59′32″E
- Location: 31 Barwon Terrace, Winchelsea, Victoria
- Country: Australia
- Denomination: Anglican Church of Australia

History
- Status: Active

Architecture
- Architect(s): Nathaniel Billing, Edward Prowse
- Style: Gothic Revival
- Years built: 1846 (original church), 1859–1860 (bluestone church)
- Completed: 1860

Administration
- Province: Victoria
- Diocese: Melbourne

Clergy
- Vicar: Rev. Chris Duff

Victorian Heritage Register
- Official name: St Thomas Church of England
- Type: Heritage Place
- Designated: 4 August 1988
- Reference no.: 69769

St Thomas' Anglican Church is a historic Anglican church located in Winchelsea, in the Surf Coast Shire of Victoria, Australia. The church grounds consist of the original 1846 church building, now part of the parish hall, and the later-built bluestone church, where church services are now conducted. The church is noted for its Gothic Revival architectural design and historically significant stained glass windows, which commemorate parish members and local families connected with the wider Winchelsea community, including most notably the Batson family of nearby Barwon Park. It remains an active parish church within the Anglican Diocese of Melbourne.

== History ==
Anglican worship began in 1846, in the original church building, financed with the assistance of local pastoralists including Thomas Austin, Prosper Trebeck and Charles Beale. This earlier structure functioned as both a school during weekdays and a place of worship on Sundays before the present church was constructed. In 1854, the Number 659 school was set up in the original church building, and by 1862, the average attendance was 26, with 16 boys and 10 girls.

The congregation quickly outgrew the original church, and a larger church was built in 1859–1860, using bluestone. Its construction was supervised by Edward Prowse, a prominent Geelong builder and architect. The church, consisting of a nave, chancel and vestry, saw its first service on 19 January 1860. The first vicar of the bluestone church was Rev. Edward Tanner.

A particularly significant aspect of the church's interior is its collection of stained glass windows, which commemorate members of the local parish and community, notably the Austin and Batson families of Barwon Park. Memorial light windows were installed by Thomas Austin in memory of his children who died young, and a stained glass window dedicated to Trooper Arthur Stanley Batson of the 8th Light Horse Regiment. The memorial window was designed by the Melbourne stained glass artist William Montgomery (1850–1927).

In the beginning of 1862, a "madman" named John Hoolahan reportedly smashed in all of the windows on the northern side of the church.

In 2011, an oak tree that stood on the church grounds was felled and crafted into several seats, dedicated to Abp Phillip Freier, Clare & Denzil Lines, George Alexander McConaghy & family, Cliff Schroeter, and to the previous vicars of the church.
