= Frank Donoghue =

Australian rules footballer, born 1904

Personal information
- Full name: Francis Patrick Donoghue
- Born: 17 August 1904; Bairnsdale, Victoria
- Died: 31 May 1971 (aged 66); Repatriation General Hospital, Heidelberg, Victoria
- Original team: University Blues
- Height: 178 cm (5 ft 10 in)
- Weight: 69 kg (152 lb)

Playing career^{1}
Years	Club	Games (Goals)
1925–28	Carlton	51 (3)
- ^{1} Playing statistics correct to the end of 1928.

Francis Patrick Donoghue (17 August 1904 – 31 May 1971) was an Australian rules footballer who played with Carlton in the Victorian Football League (VFL).

== Family ==
The son of Patrick Donoghue (1871-1946), and Mary Elizabeth Donoghue (1878-1952), née Deery, Francis Patrick Donoghue as born at Bairnsdale, Victoria on 17 August 1904.

He married Jessica Beatrice Mills (1908-2000) in 1933. he married Mary Elizabeth Fitzpatrick in 1954.

== Education ==
He was educated at Nambrok State School No.3626, Sale High School, and Xavier College.

As a resident of Newman College he studied medicine at the University of Melbourne, graduating Bachelor of Medicine and Bachelor of Surgery (M.B.B.S.) on 17 September 1928.

== Football ==
Recruited from University Blues, and cleared from the Rosedale Football Club in Gippsland, he played in 51 games for the Carlton First XVIII over four seasons (1925-1928).

On Saturday, 31 July 1926 he played for a representative VFL side in a match against a combined Ovens and Murray League team.

== Medical practice ==
In mid-1936 he took over the practice of the recently deceased Horace Pern (1872-1936), M.R.C.S. (Eng.), L.R.C.P. (Lond.), in Leongatha, Victoria.

== Military service ==
He served in the Australian Army Medical Corps in the Second World War.

== Death ==
He died at the Repatriation General Hospital, in Heidelberg, Victoria on 31 May 1971.
