= Chilwell (disambiguation) =

Chilwell may refer to:

== People ==
- Ben Chilwell (born 1996), English footballer

== Places ==
- Chilwell, a village and residential suburb of Nottingham, England
- Chilwell, a suburb of Newtown, Victoria, Australia
