= Rabbits in Australia =

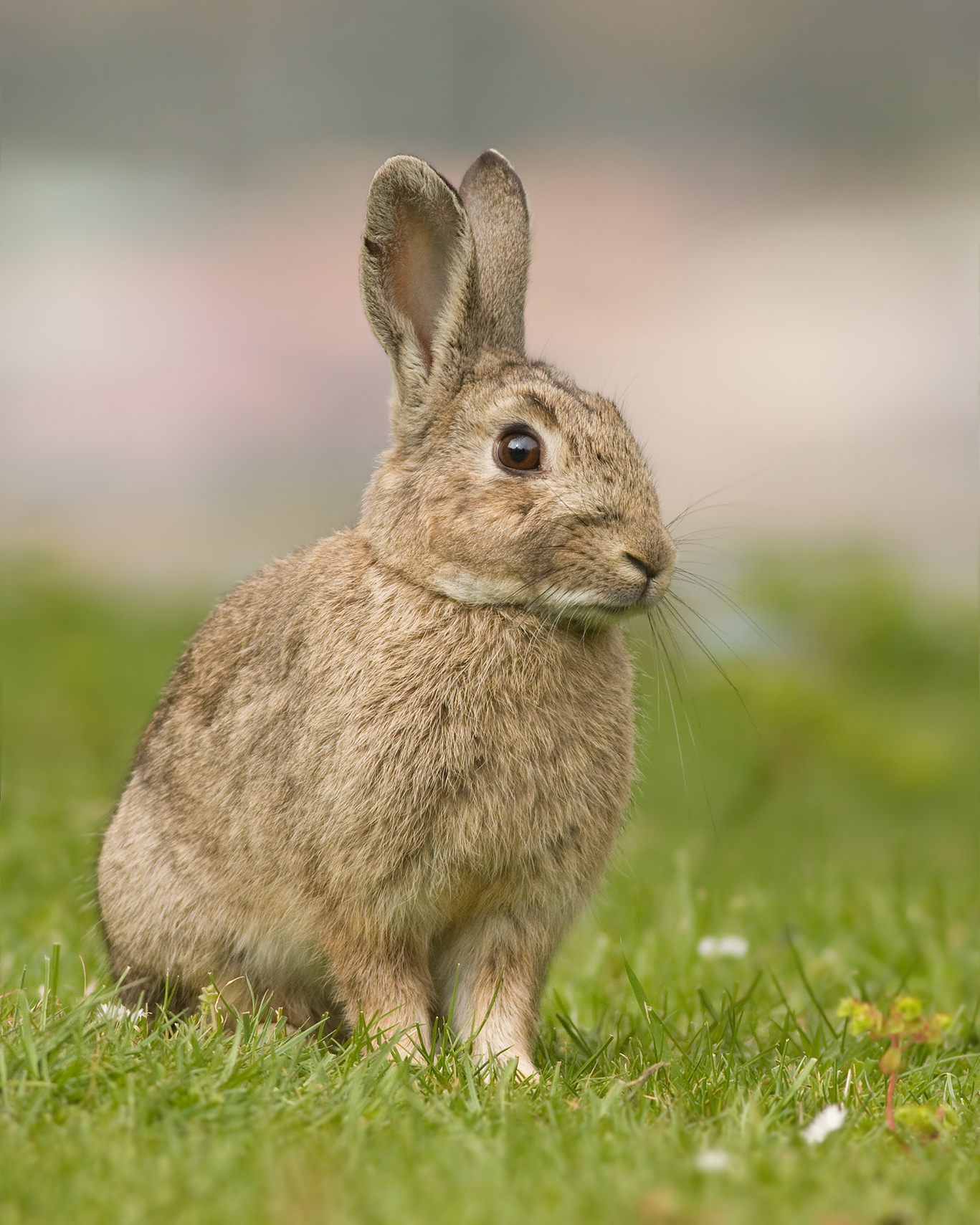
A European rabbit in Tasmania

European rabbits (Oryctolagus cuniculus) were first introduced to Australia in the 18th century with the First Fleet, and later became widespread, because of Thomas Austin. Such wild rabbit populations are a serious mammalian pest and invasive species in Australia causing millions of dollars' worth of damage to crops. Their spread may have been enhanced through the emergence of strong crossbreeds.

Various methods in the 20th century have been attempted to control the Australian rabbit population. Conventional methods include shooting rabbits and destroying their warrens, but these had only limited success. From 1901 to 1907, a rabbit-proof fence was built in Western Australia in an unsuccessful attempt to contain the rabbits. The myxoma virus, which causes myxomatosis, was introduced into the rabbit population in the 1950s and had the effect of severely reducing the rabbit population. However, the survivors have since adapted and partially recovered their previous numbers. Domesticated rabbits are banned as pets in the state of Queensland.

== Effects on Australia's ecology ==
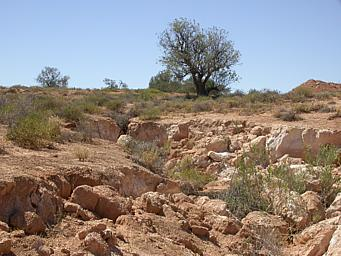
The erosion of a gully in South Australia caused by rabbits overgrazing

While native O. cuniculus populations may be more threatened in Western Europe, following their introduction from Europe in the 19th century, the effect of rabbits on the ecology of Australia has been devastating. They are suspected of being the most significant known factor in species loss in Australia. Rabbits are believed to have had an immense impact on the abundance of natural resource availability, primarily concerning overgrazing. The rabbits would first deplete the natural pasture vegetation, and would then resort to consuming woody vegetation, which included small shrubs, and the leaves and bark of trees. The extent of plant species' loss is unknown at this time, though rabbits are known to often kill young trees in orchards, forests, and on properties by ringbarking them.

Rabbits are also responsible for serious erosion problems, as they eat native plants, leaving the topsoil exposed and vulnerable to sheet, gully, and wind erosion. The removal of this topsoil is devastating to the land, as it takes many hundreds of years to regenerate.

== History ==
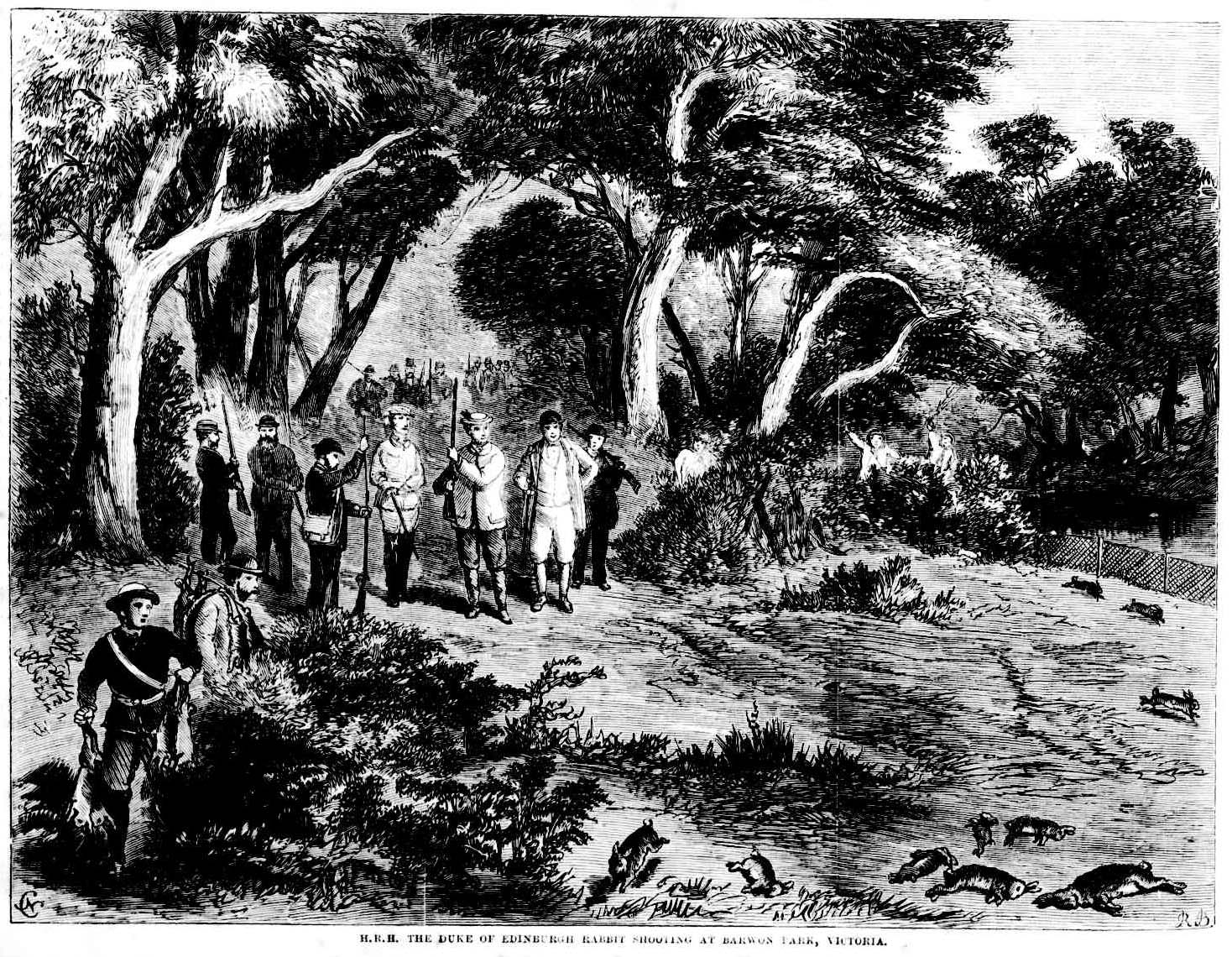
Alfred, Duke of Edinburgh, rabbit shooting at Barwon Park, Victoria in the 1860s

Rabbits were first introduced to Australia by the First Fleet in 1788. They were bred as food animals, probably in cages. In the first decades, they do not appear to have been numerous, judging from their absence from archaeological collections of early colonial food remains. However, by 1827 in Tasmania, a newspaper article noted "...the common rabbit is becoming so numerous throughout the colony, that they are running about on some large estates by thousands. We understand, that there are no rabbits whatever in the elder colony" i.e., New South Wales (NSW). This clearly shows a localised rabbit population explosion was underway in Tasmania in the early 19th century. At the same time in NSW, Cunningham noted, "... rabbits are bred around houses, but we have yet no wild ones in enclosures..." He also noted the scrubby, sandy rubble between Sydney and Botany Bay would be ideal for farming rabbits.

Enclosures appear to mean more extensive rabbit-farming warrens, rather than cages. The first of these, in Sydney at least, was one built by Alexander Macleay at Elizabeth Bay House, "a preserve or rabbit-warren, surrounded by a substantial stone wall, and well stocked with that choice game." In the 1840s, rabbit-keeping became even more common, with examples of the theft of rabbits from ordinary peoples' houses appearing in court records and rabbits entering the diets of ordinary people.

In 1857–1858, Alexander Buchanan, overseer for F. H. Dutton's Anlaby Estate in the Mid-North of South Australia, released a number of rabbits for hunting sport. Their population remained fairly stable until around 1866, presumed to have been kept in check by native carnivores and protected from poachers by an Act of Parliament, but by 1867 was out of control. The population explosion was ascribed to the disappearance of native predators, but the emergence of a hardier breed by natural selection has subsequently been attributed to their spread.

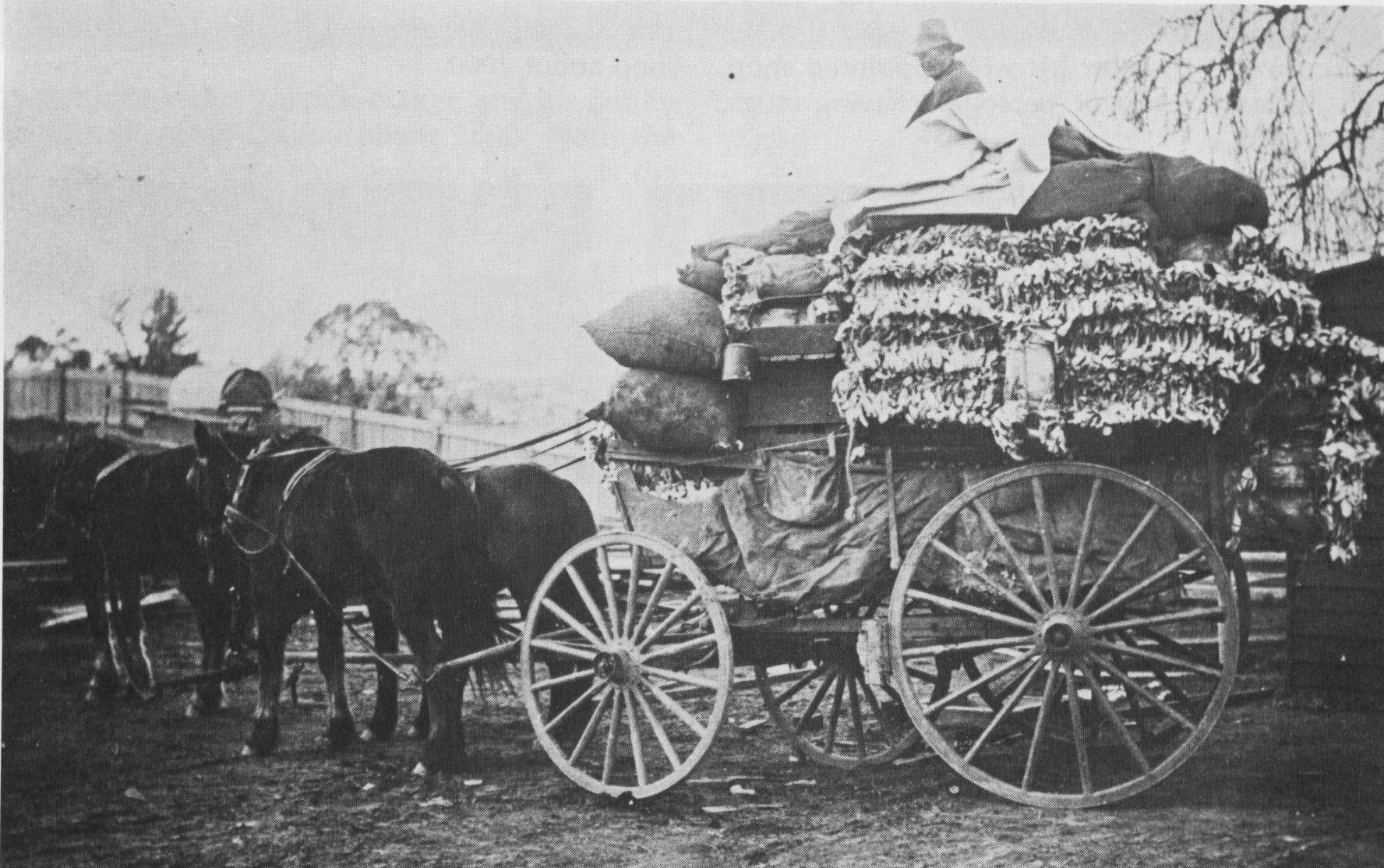
A load of rabbit skins, Northern Tablelands, New South Wales

The current infestation appears to have originated with the release of at least 13 wild rabbits by Thomas Austin for hunting purposes in October 1859, on his property, Barwon Park, near Winchelsea, Victoria and by 1866, the Geelong Advertiser reported 50,000 having been killed by hunters. While living in England, Austin had been an avid hunter, regularly dedicating his weekends to rabbit shooting. Upon arriving in Australia, which had no native rabbit population, Austin asked his nephew William Austin in England to send him 12 grey rabbits, five hares, 72 partridges, and some sparrows so he could continue his hobby in Australia by creating a local population of the species. At the time, he had stated, "The introduction of a few rabbits could do little harm and might provide a touch of home, in addition to a spot of hunting". William could not source enough grey rabbits to meet his uncle's order, so he topped it up by buying domestic rabbits. One theory as to why the Barwon Park rabbits adapted so well to Australia is that the hybrid rabbits that resulted from the interbreeding of the two distinct types were much more suited to Australian conditions. Many other farms released their rabbits into the wild after Austin.

The rabbits were extremely prolific and spread rapidly across the southern parts of the country. Australia had ideal conditions for a rabbit population explosion. With mild winters, rabbits were able to breed the entire year. With widespread farming, areas that might otherwise have been scrub or woodlands were, instead, turned into vast areas with low vegetation, creating ideal habitats for rabbits.

In a classic example of unintended consequences, rabbits had become so prevalent within 10 years of their introduction in 1859 that two million could be shot or trapped annually without having any noticeable effect on the population. It was the fastest spread ever recorded of any mammal anywhere in the world. Today, rabbits are entrenched in the southern and central areas of the country, with scattered populations in the northern deserts.

Although the rabbit is a notorious pest, it proved useful to many people during the depressions of the 1890s and 1930s and during wartime. Trapping rabbits helped farmers, stockmen, and stationhands by providing food and extra income, and in some cases helped pay off farming debts. Rabbits were fed to working dogs and boiled to be fed to poultry. Later, frozen rabbit carcasses were traded locally and exported. Pelts, too, were used in the fur trade and are still used in the felt-hat industry.

== Control measures ==
By 1887, losses from rabbit damage compelled the New South Wales government to offer a £25,000 reward, equivalent to A$3.9 million in 2022, for "any method of success not previously known in the Colony for the effectual extermination of rabbits". The commission received 1,456 suggestions, including several schemes involving biological controls (see below), but none was found to be both safe and effective.

A Royal Commission was held to investigate the situation in 1901. Once the problem was understood, various control methods were tried to limit or reduce the population of rabbits in Australia. These methods had limited success until the introduction of biological control methods in the latter half of the 20th century.

=== Common control measures ===
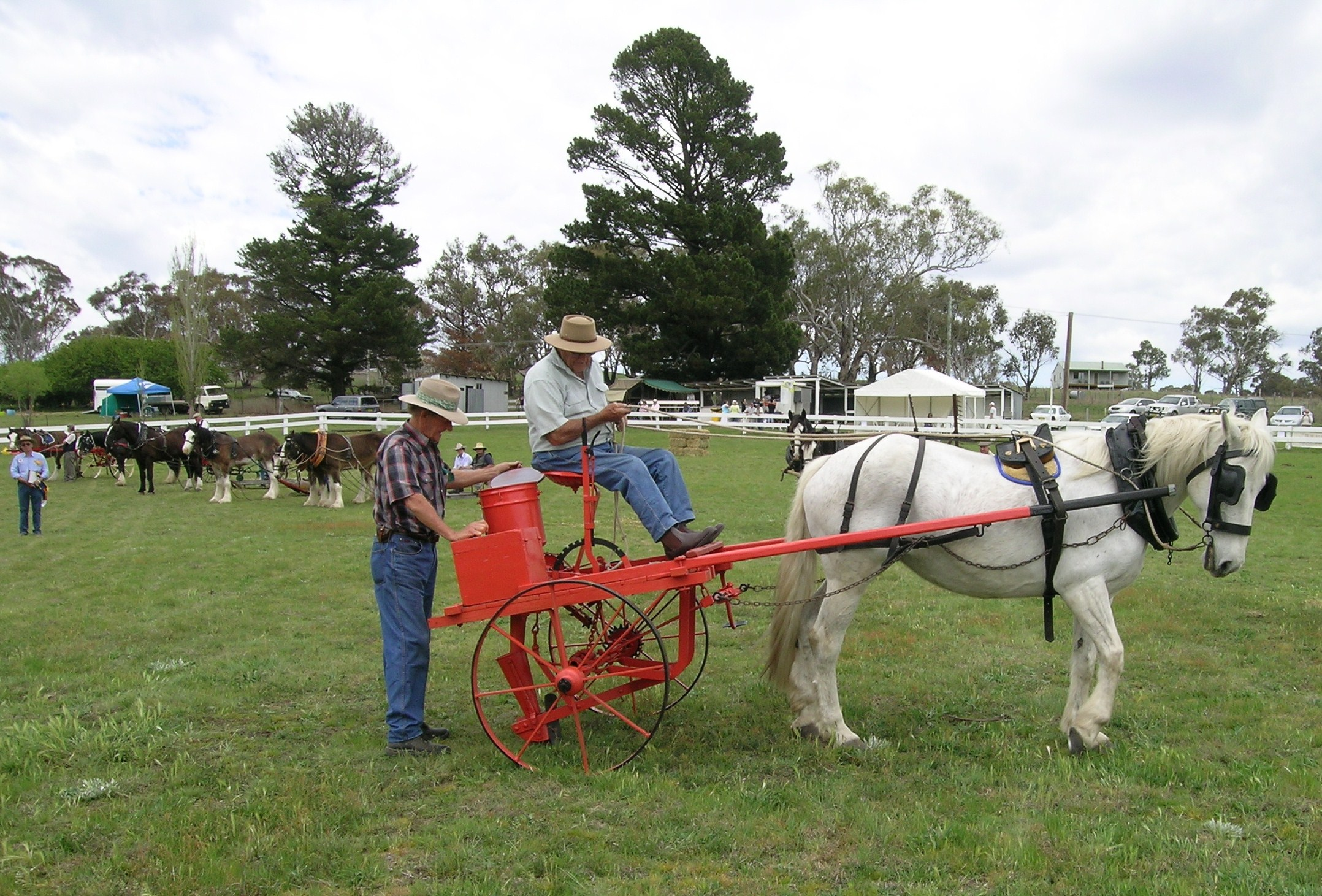
An old poison cart, which distributed poisoned baits to kill rabbits, Woolbrook, NSW

Shooting rabbits is one of the most common control methods and can successfully be used to keep already-low populations in check while providing food for people or pets, though it is ineffective for large-scale eradication.

Destroying warrens through ripping (a procedure wherein rabbits are dismembered or buried alive as a bulldozer dragging sharp tines is driven over their warrens or burrows), ploughing, blasting, and fumigating is widely used, especially on large farms (known as "stations"). The sandy soil in many parts of Australia makes ripping and ploughing a viable method of control, and both tractors and bulldozers are used for this operation.

Poisoning is probably the most widely used of the conventional techniques, as it requires the least effort and is capable of destroying a local population, though reinfestation given the mobility of the animal is almost inevitable. Laying baits of pollard laced with a phosphorus-based poison, such as "S.A.P." manufactured by Sayers, Allport & Potter, was an early method. The advantage of phosphorus is that in dry weather, assuming it has not been laid in clumps (obviated by use of a poison cart), it soon degrades to innocuous phosphoric acid and presents no further danger to livestock or pets. It does, however, present a real fire risk, and concentrated fumes can be toxic to operators. More modern poisons for rabbit control are sodium fluoroacetate ("1080") and pindone.

Another technique is hunting using ferrets, wherein ferrets are deployed to chase the rabbits out to be shot or into nets set over the burrows. Since the number of rabbits ferrets can kill is limited, this is more a hunting activity than a serious control method. Although ferrets and other mustelid species are used as control measures, Australia has significantly fewer wild mustelids to prey on the invasive rabbits while in their warrens or burrows compared to Europe and the United States.

Historically, trapping was also frequently used; steel-jawed leg-holding traps were banned in most states in the 1980s on animal-cruelty grounds, though trapping continues at a lower level using rubber-jawed traps. All of these techniques are limited to working only in settled areas and are quite labour-intensive.

=== Fences ===
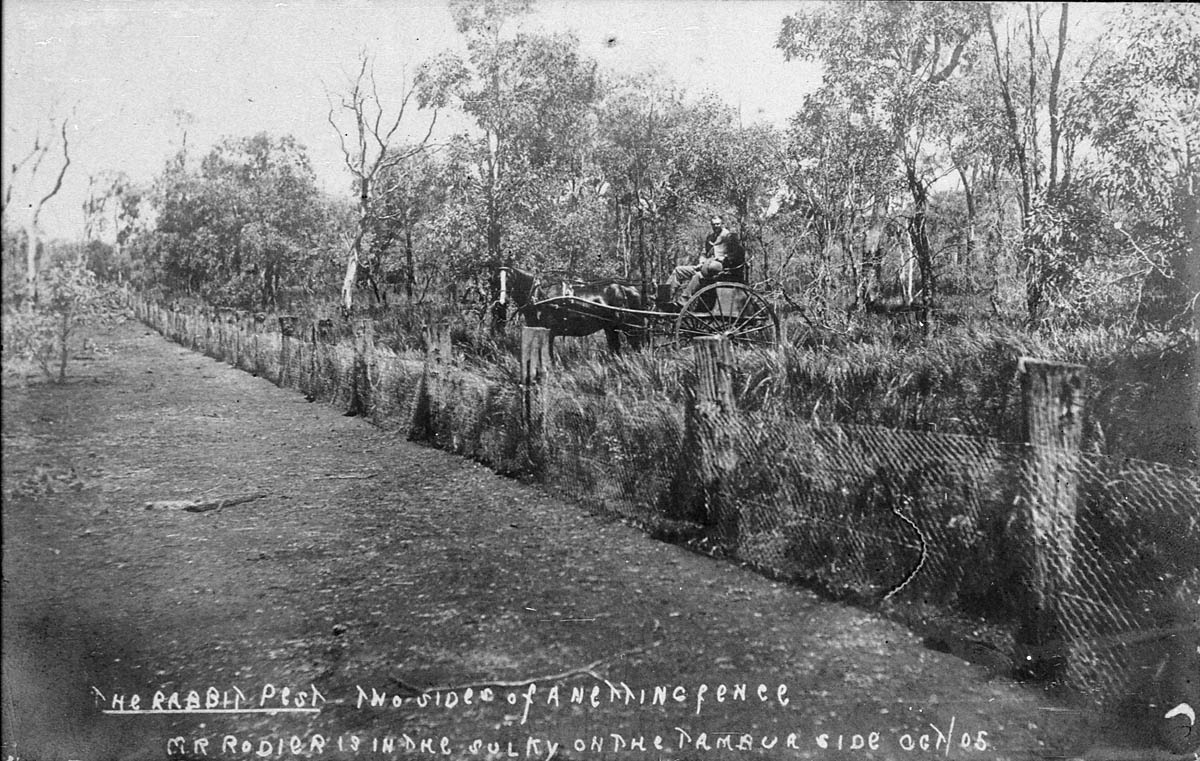
Impact of rabbit-proof fence, Cobar, New South Wales, 1905

Ring-fencing can be highly effective way of providing a rabbit-free area. In the 1880s, James Moseley ringed Coondambo Station with wire netting and fenced off the watercourses; at the first heatwave, the rabbits perished of thirst. Shortly after 1900, he fenced off the deserted Yardea, Paney, Pondana, Yarloo, and Thurlga stations in the Gawler Ranges with 150 miles (240 km) of wire netting, turning them within a few years from degraded land overrun with rabbits into a profitable sheep run.

Well-known modern examples, which also exclude foxes, dogs, and cats are Warrawong and Yookamurra wildlife sanctuaries, pioneered by John Wamsley.

Two well-known examples of much more extensive fences are:

==== Queensland ====
In July 1884, Ernest James Stevens, a member of the Queensland Legislative Assembly, proposed that the Queensland government erect a fence to prevent the infestation of rabbits in New South Wales from spreading into Queensland (his Logan electorate being very close to the New South Wales border).

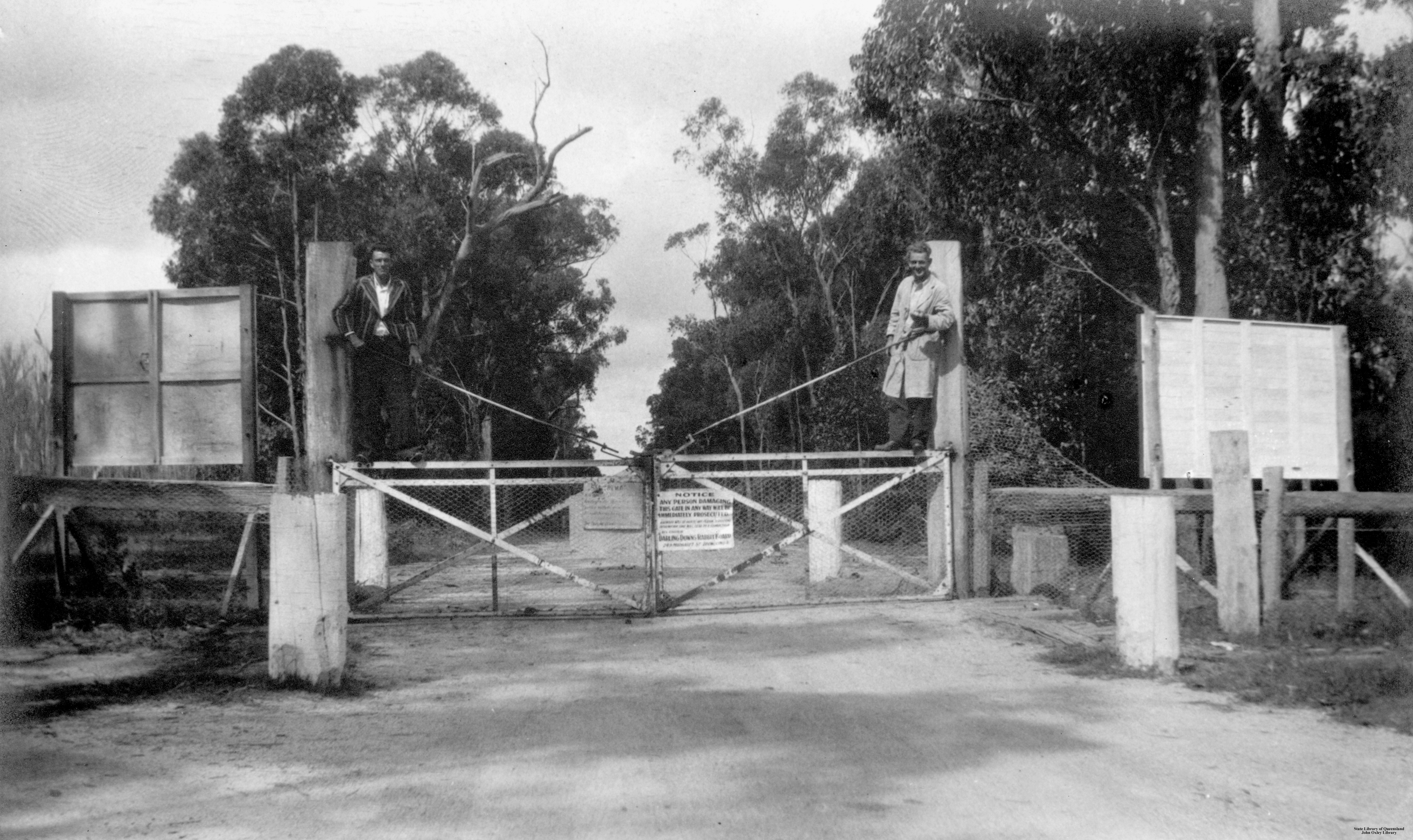
Gate in the Rabbit Fence at Stanthorpe, Queensland, 1934

In 1893, a rabbit-proof fence was commenced in Queensland. It was progressively extended through the years. In 1997, a final segment was built connecting it to the Dingo Fence. It extends from Mount Gipps (near Rathdowney) to Goombi between Chinchilla and Miles.

==== Western Australia ====
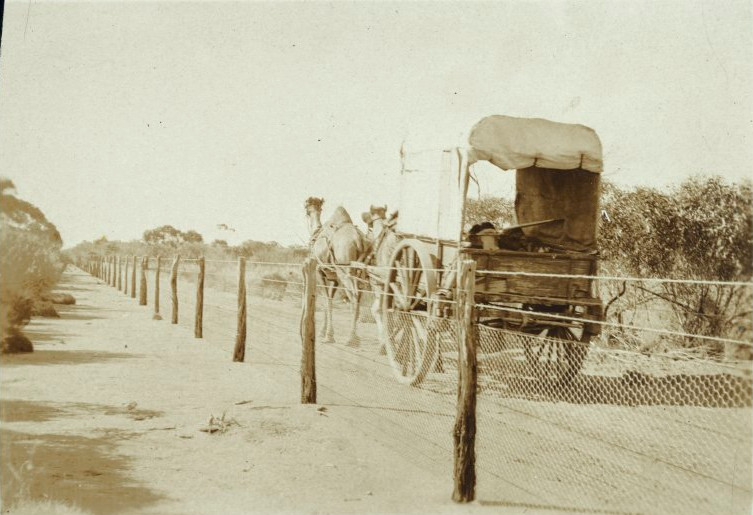
The No. 1 rabbit-fence in Western Australia (1926)

From 1901 to 1907, the rabbit-proof fence was built in Western Australia between Cape Keraudren and Esperance to try to control the spread of the rabbit population from the east into Western Australian pastoral areas. Given that European rabbits can both jump very high and burrow underground, a perfectly intact fence stretching for hundreds of kilometres, and whose gates farmers or graziers did not leave open for livestock or machinery, was still unlikely to succeed. As such, the Number 1 Rabbit-Proof Fence, which was erected in 1901, failed to keep the rabbit population away from the protected area. Even after this large scale fence had failed, smaller scale fencing projects continued to make a successful appearance.

=== Biological measures ===
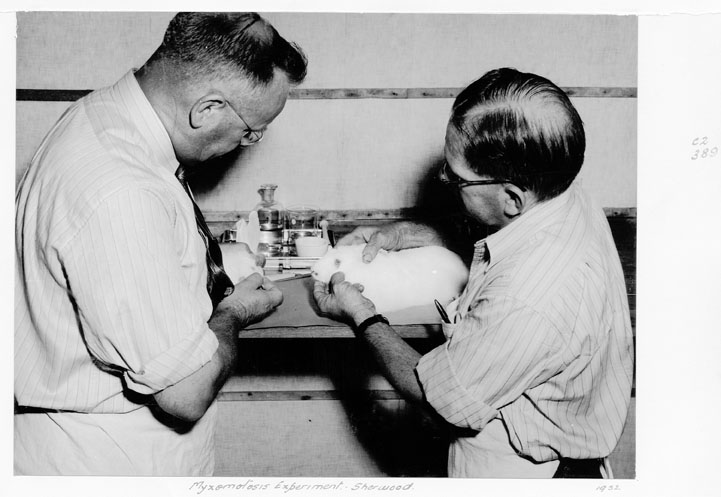
Myxomatosis control trial, 1952

Releasing rabbit-borne diseases has proven somewhat successful in controlling the population of rabbits in Australia, but has not occurred as quickly as was hoped.

An offer by the New South Wales government of a £25,000 reward for a biological control of rabbits attracted the attention of Louis Pasteur, who proposed using viral biological control methods including the use of chicken cholera bacillus (now known as Pasteurella multocida). Although that measure did not prove viable, the association with Pasteur accelerated the introduction of microbiology into Australia.

On 16 April 1888, the New South Wales government appointed a royal commission "to make a full and diligent inquiry as to whether or not the introduction of contagious diseases amongst rabbits by inoculation or otherwise, or the propagation of diseases natural to rabbits ... will be accompanied or followed by danger to human health or life, or to animal life other than rabbits, or to interfere injuriously with the profitable carrying on of agricultural or pastoral pursuits ..." Under the aegis of the commission, tests were conducted at Rodd Island, and although rabbits who were given food adulterated with chicken cholera bacillus were killed, no evidence was found of the contagion spreading to healthy rabbits.

In 1885, Professor Archibald Watson of the University of Adelaide suggested releasing rabbits inoculated with rabbit scab into an enclosed trial area. Limited trials suggested that the measure would be ineffective in the drier parts of the continent.

In September 1887, Dr Herbert Butcher (1854–1893) of Wilcannia found a number of dead, emaciated rabbits at Tintinallogy Station. Dr H. Ellis of Sydney and he concluded that the animals had died of a novel disease, which they dubbed Tintinallogy virus. They felt it could be an effective control measure, but whatever the rabbits died from was never proved to be infectious or contagious. It may have been simple starvation caused by natural elements.

In 1906 and 1907, Jean Danysz, of the Pasteur Institute of Paris, conducted trials on Broughton Island, New South Wales, of a strain of Pasteurella bacteria he had developed, which proved to be specific to rabbits, but it proved to be a less-than-satisfactory control measure. Dr Danysz felt that Broughton Island was a poor choice of test site, and that extensive experiments should be conducted on the mainland. Frank Tidswell, who was his chief Australian collaborator, continued Danysz's trials after he left in 1907, and also began trials of the Yalgogrin, Gundagai, and Picton microbes (named for the stations where infected rabbits were found), but financial support was lacking from the Federal government, or the collaboration of affected states, that would be necessary to prove that the measure safe and effective. The fact that these pathogens did not wipe out whole populations might have raised doubts as to their efficacy.

In 1950, following research conducted by Frank Fenner, myxoma virus was deliberately released into the rabbit population, causing it to drop from an estimated 600 million to around 100 million. Growing genetic resistance in the remaining rabbits had allowed the population to recover to 200–300 million by 1991.

To combat that trend, over three years from June 1991, the Commonwealth Scientific and Industrial Research Organisation (CSIRO) comprehensively tested the potential of a Calicivirus, which causes rabbit haemorrhagic disease (RHD), for biological control of wild rabbits. The virus escaped from a quarantine compound on Wardang Island, South Australia, where the field tests were being carried out, and by late October 1995, it was recorded in rabbits at Yunta and Gum Creek, in north-eastern South Australia. By the winter of 1996, the virus was established in Victoria, New South Wales, the Northern Territory and Western Australia. The virus was discovered in these areas by analyzing livers of dead rabbits. The success of the virus was found to be higher in dry areas, because of a benign calicivirus found in the colder, wetter areas of Australia, which was immunising rabbits against the more virulent form.

A legal vaccine exists in Australia for RHD, but no cure is known for either myxomatosis or RHD, and many affected pets have to be euthanized. In Europe, where rabbits are farmed on a large scale, they are protected against myxomatosis and calicivirus with a genetically modified virus developed in Spain.

A team headed by virologist Francisco Parra, working with the University of Oviedo, in Asturias, northern Spain, identified a new variant of the virus in 2012. The pathogen, a new strain of K5 (RHDV1), is both extremely lethal and highly contagious. In 2017, it was released by Australian authorities at around 600 points on the continent. Owners of domestic rabbits were advised to vaccinate their animals.

In southern Europe, the scarcity of rabbits threatens the conservation of endangered predator species higher up the food chain, that depend on small game such as rabbits. These include the Iberian lynx and the Iberian imperial eagle. For this reason, biological warfare against rabbits in Australia is a serious concern for conservation activities in other parts of the world.

The cost of rabbit vaccination substantially raises the cost of rabbit meat in Australia; from 2004 to 2014, the number of farms dropped from 80 to 4, and the meat has become a rarity.

== Eradication ==
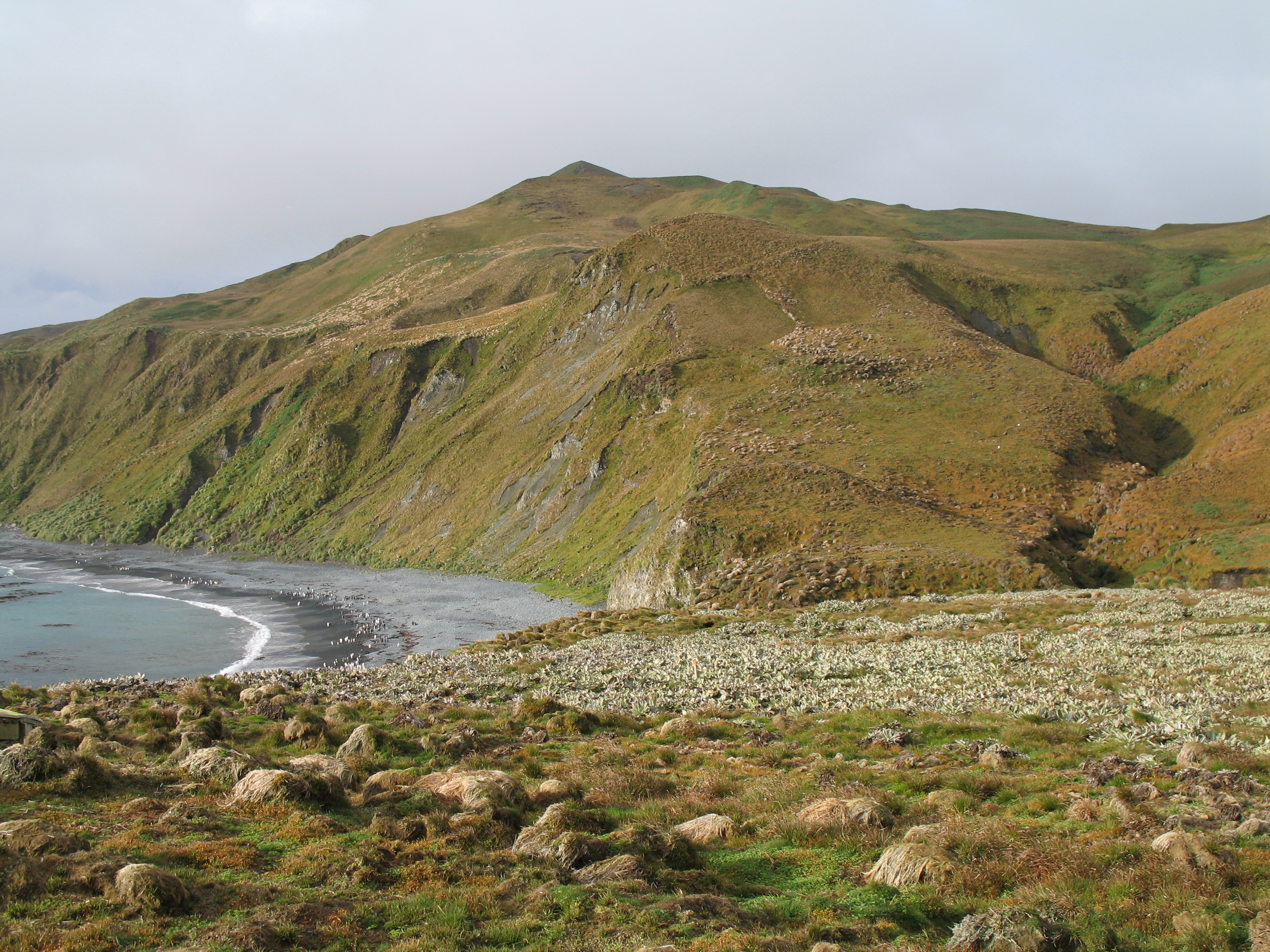
Macquarie Island, home to the largest and most successful rabbit eradication program in Australian history. Rabbit overgrazing caused soil erosion and destroyed native plant life which has since recovered helping the burrowing petrels to re-establish.

While most scientsists now consider eradication of rabbits from the mainland impossible with current technology, targeted local eradication programs, particularly on islands have experienced success. One of the earliest examples was in 1969 when Carnac Island (WA), where rabbits were introduced in 1827, was successfully cleared through a 2 year program of targetted carrot baiting with 1080 poison.

Cabbage Tree Island (NSW), where rabbits were introduced in 1906 was successfully cleared in 1997 through biological control methods and baiting. Another eradication program on a New South Wales island, Barunguba / Montague Island was run from 2007-2009 and cleared a population that had been there since the 1800s through biological control and baiting.

Rabbits were cleared from Macquarie Island, a jurisdiction of Tasmania in 2014, where they were introduced in 1878, had peaked in numbers to over 10,000 and had done considerable environmental damage including the extinction of the Macquarie parakeet. Since rabbits were removed native plant life including leafy megaherbs and tussock has recovered and burrowing petrels re-established nests.

Deen Maar in Victoria's successful eradication program, where rabbits were introduced in 1868, saw rabbits completely eliminated by 2024.

== In popular culture ==
- The Australian wine brand "Rabbit & Spaghetti" is named in remembrance of the typical Australian-Italian fusion meals shared by Australian farmers and Italian prisoners-of-war who had been captured in Northern Africa during World War II and sent to Australia to work on farms.
- The rabbit puppet Mixy M. Toasus from the 1994 children's comedy show The Ferals is named after myxamitosis disease.

== See also ==
- Cats in Australia
- CSIRO Hut
- Easter Bilby
- Rabbit plagues in Australia
