= CSIRO Hut =

Mountain hut in Mount Kosciuszko, Australia

- Interactive map of the CSIRO Hut area

General information
- Coordinates: 36°13′45.5″S 148°33′38.3″E
- Year built: 1963

CSIRO Hut, also known as the Rabbiters Hut, is an Australian alpine hut in the Kosciuszko National Park.

The hut was built by the CSIRO in 1963 as a base camp for researchers investigating methods of controlling rabbits in Australia. It was located in the north-eastern region of Snowy Plain, where the region's rabbit population was high. Further rabbit research programs were conducted in the area from 1966 to 1971, and from 1995.

The CSIRO ceased to operate the hut in 2000 following government cutbacks in rabbit research. Since then it has been available as a shelter for hikers in Kosciuszko National Park.

The CSIRO Hut is a single room with basic kitchen facilities. Construction materials include timber walls and floor, asbestos cement cladding and a corrugated iron roof.
