= Noble Street Uniting Church =

Uniting church in Newtown, Victoria, Australia

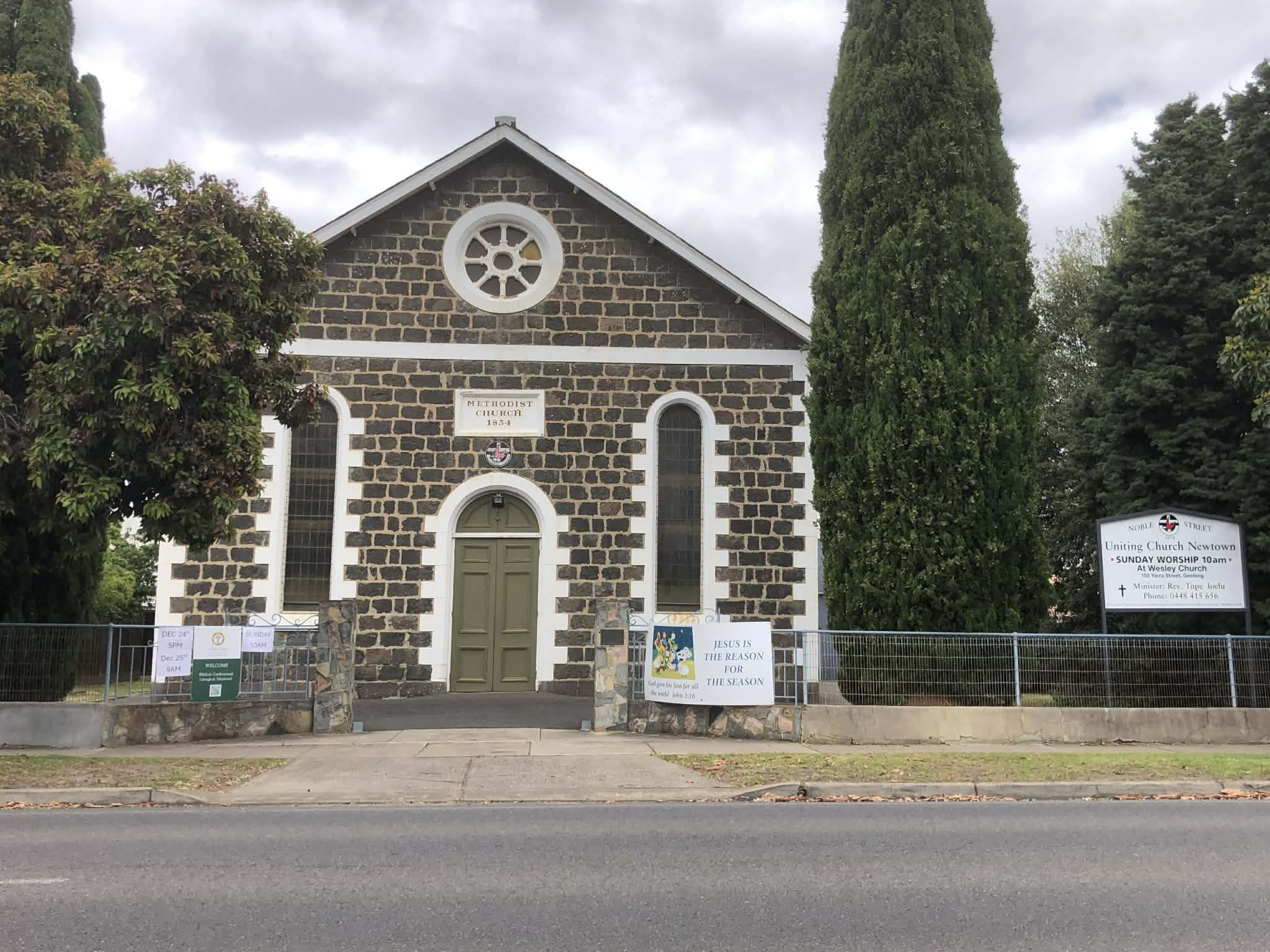
- Noble Street Uniting Church, Newtown, Victoria, Australia
- Noble Street Uniting Church
- 38°09′16″S 144°20′55″E
- Address: 35 Noble Street, Newtown, Victoria
- Country: Australia
- Denomination: Uniting (since 1977)
- Website: https://victas.uca.org.au/church/newtown-noble-street/

History
- Former name: Noble Street Wesleyan Methodist Church
- Founded: 1854

Architecture
- Architect(s): Davidson and Henderson
- Architectural type: Church
- Style: Norman Romanesque
- Years built: 1854,1859

Administration
- Parish: Barrabool

Noble Street Uniting Church is a historic Uniting Church congregation and heritage-listed church building located at 35 Noble Street, Newtown, Victoria, Australia. Originally constructed as a Wesleyan Methodist Church in 1854, the building has served Protestant congregations continuously for over 160 years. The church is notable for its bluestone Norman Romanesque architecture, and historic pipe organ.

== History ==
Methodist services in Newtown began under trees on Chilwell Flat in 1849, led by lay preacher Mr Waldock, with a Sunday school soon established in a private home. In 1850, a small bluestone building was erected on Saffron Street for school and worship. The foundation stone for the present church was laid on 14 June 1854 by Mr Westcott of Barwon Grange, and the building officially opened on 5 November 1854 as the Wesleyan Methodist Church.

As the congregation grew, the church was extended in 1859 by removing the southern wall to enlarge the nave. In 1876, transepts, a choir gallery, and a pipe organ were added. Interior elements such as timber pews, pulpit and gallery balustrades remain largely original, and the church also includes a wheel window.

The George Fincham pipe organ, installed in 1876, features mechanical action, spotted metal pipes, and a Gothic-style timber case designed to complement the interior. In 1955, Hill, Norman & Beard rebuilt and modernised the instrument, upgrading the action and console while retaining much of the original pipework and tonal qualities.

The Sunday School and hall, built in 1890 is constructed in a contrasting Gothic style, featuring lancet windows, label moulds, and a timber ceiling with exposed trusses, typical of mid-19th century ecclesiastical design. A kindergarten was later attached in 1915. The church became part of the Methodist Church of Australasia around 1900 and joined the Uniting Church in Australia upon the denomination's formation in 1977.
