= Barwon Park =

Historic mansion in Victoria, Australia

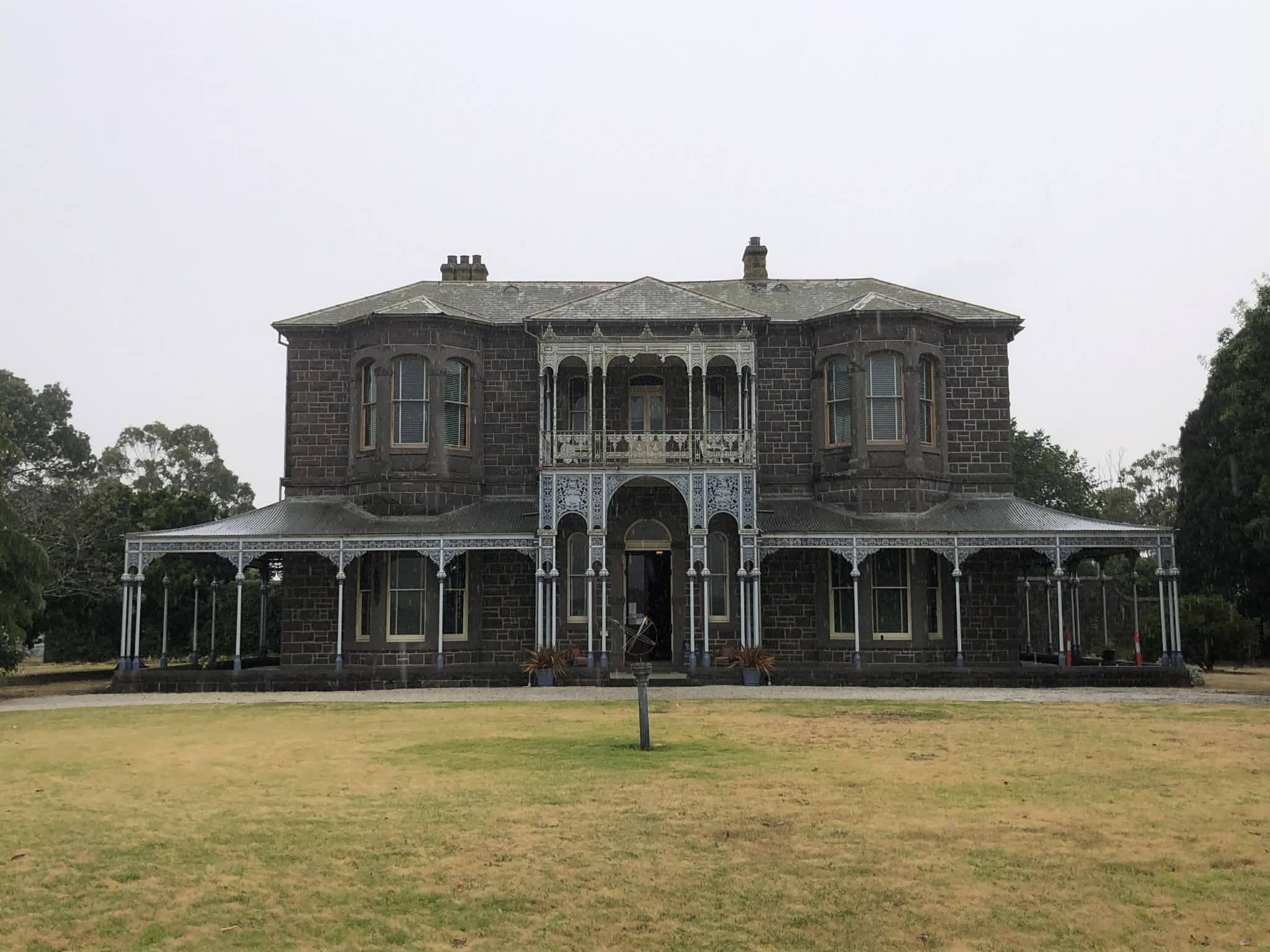
- Barwon Park Mansion, 2025
- Interactive map of Barwon Park
- 38°13′29″S 143°59′43.8″E
- Type: Homestead / Mansion, associated built facilities and grounds
- Location: Winchelsea, Victoria, Australia
- Nearest city: Geelong

History
- Built: 1871
- Built for: Thomas & Elizabeth Austin

Site notes
- Architect(s): George Henderson and Alexander Davidson
- Architectural style: Italianate
- Restored by: National Trust
- Current use: House museum operated by the National Trust

Victorian Heritage Register
- Official name: Barwon Park
- Type: Registered place
- Designated: 9 October 1974
- Reference no.: H0365
- Heritage overlay no.: HO22
- Categories: Farming and Grazing; Residential buildings (private)

Barwon Park is a large nineteenth-century bluestone mansion and pastoral estate located outside of Winchelsea, in the Surf Coast Shire of Victoria, Australia. Constructed between 1869 and 1871 for prominent pastoralist Thomas Austin and his wife Elizabeth Austin, the house is regarded as one of the finest surviving examples of a Italianate rural mansion in Victoria's Western District. The infestation of European rabbits across Australia originated from Thomas Austin's decision to release a dozen of them into the wild for hunting purposes in 1859. Barwon Park was added to the Victorian Heritage Register on 9 October 1974. Bequeathed to the National Trust of Australia (Victoria) in 1975, the mansion is owned and managed by the National Trust, operating as a house museum open to the public.

== History ==
=== The Austin family background and early history ===
The origins of Barwon Park are tied to the life of Thomas Austin (1815–1871), an English-born pastoralist who arrived in Van Diemen's Land in 1831, who was born in Baltonsborough, Somerset.

In 1837, Austin took up land near the Barwon River, south-west of Geelong, where he established a substantial pastoral run that became known as Barwon Park. Early improvements included a basic wooden homestead building consisting of two rooms, fencing, and stock management infrastructure.

In 1845, Austin married Elizabeth Austin (née Harding). Elizabeth Austin was born in Middle Chinnock, also in Somerset in 1821, and arrived in the Port Phillip District alongside her family in 1841, squatting on land near present-day Winchelsea.

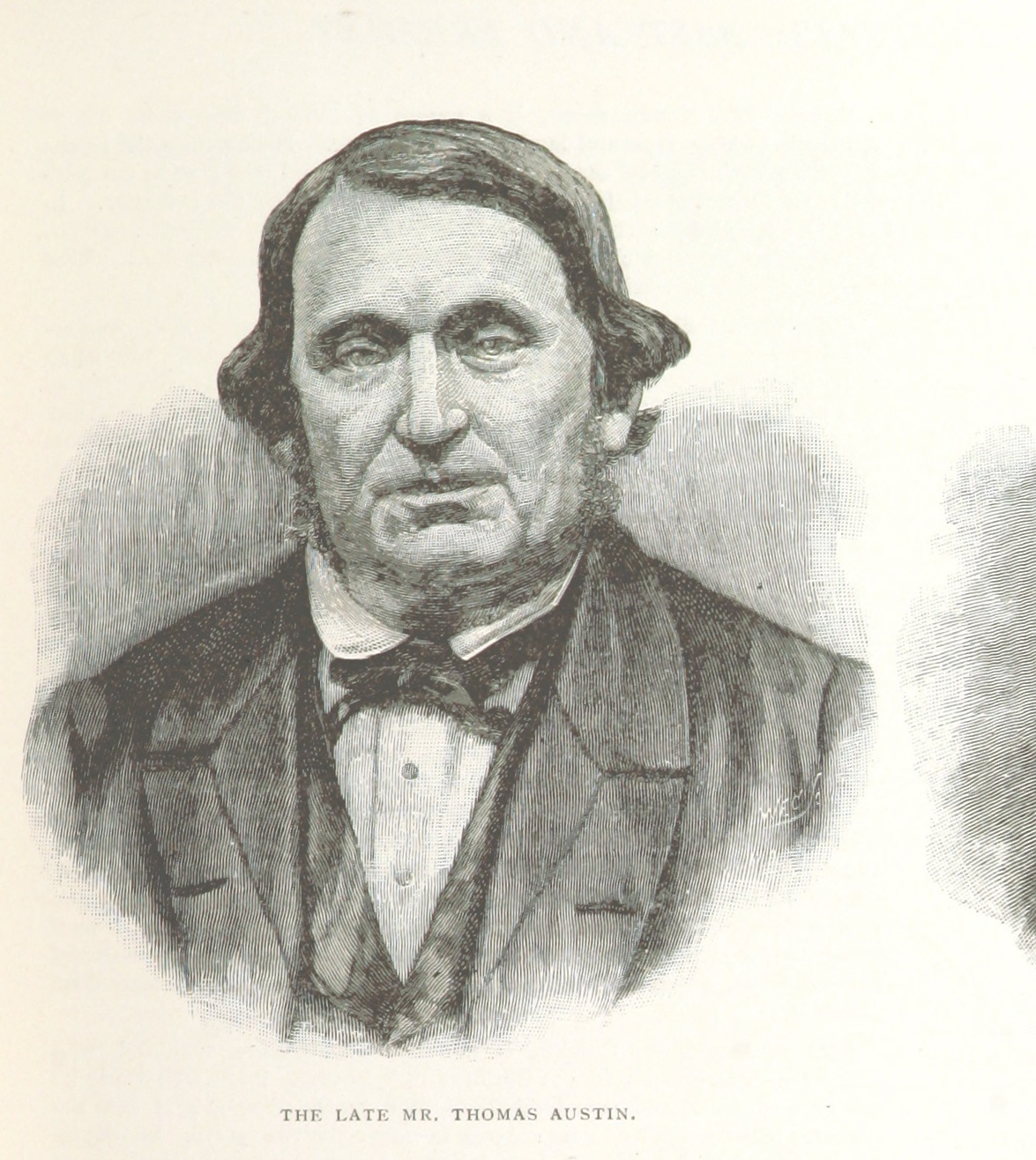
Thomas Austin

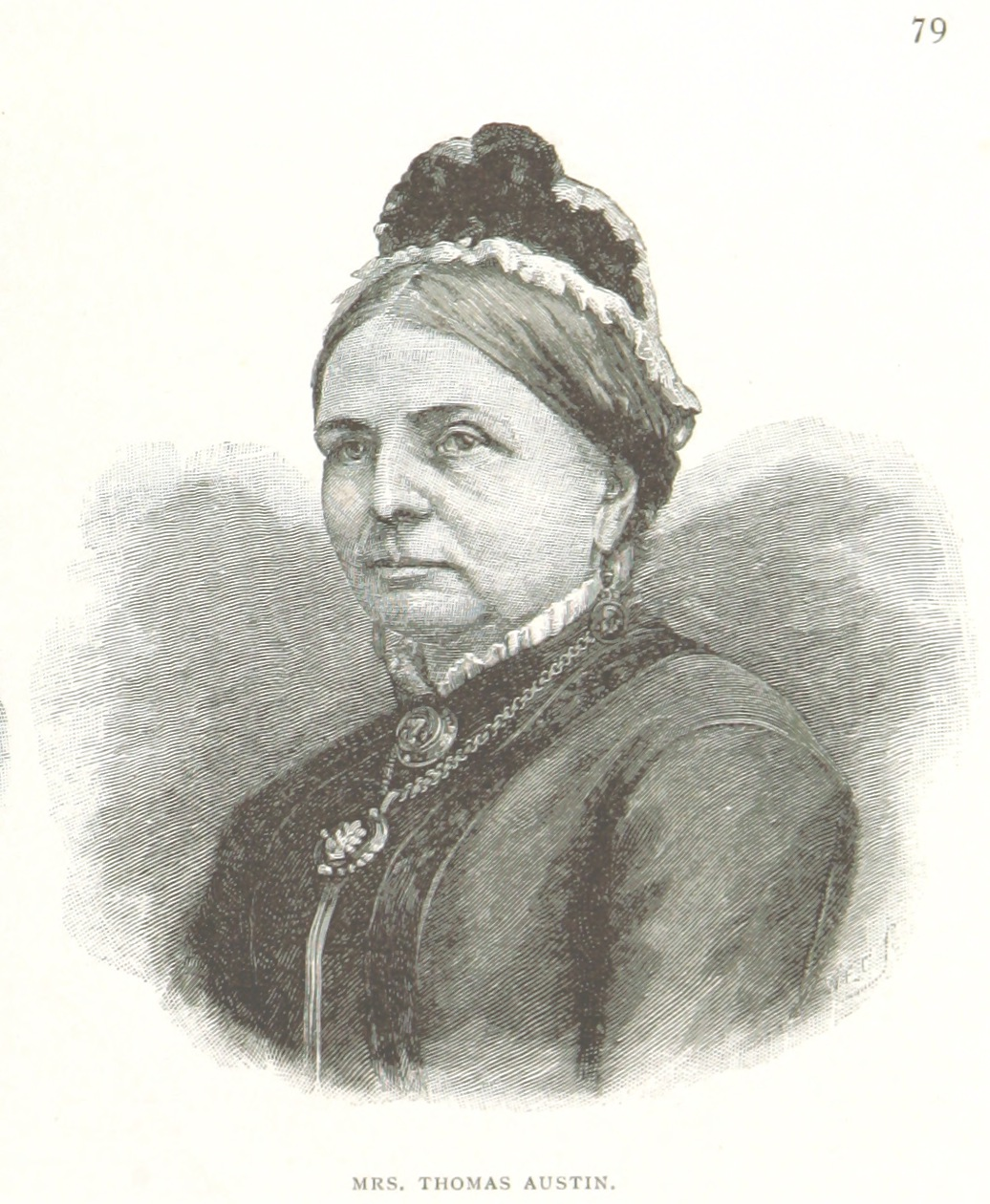
Elizabeth Austin

Between 1847 and 1855, a larger house was built with bluestone quarried from the local area, which also bore the name Barwon Park. It was a simple, single-storey symmetrical house, consisting of four rooms, a central passage, and an attic with an extra bedroom inside, as well as a verandah, with a kitchen, service area and servants' quarters located behind. The house, now demolished, is marked by elm trees. Additionally, Thomas, who had an interest in horseracing, built a training track, and established a thoroughbred breeding program, and he has been credited by many as the founder of the Victorian horseracing industry.

Thomas Austin was a prominent member of the Acclimatisation Society of Victoria. In 1859, Austin infamously purchased several game animals, which included two dozen wild rabbits. Austin initially established the purchase for a breeding colony, but after a few years, the rabbit population surged, and the rabbits spread out into the surrounding district and beyond.

=== The Royal Visit of 1867 ===
One of the most significant events in the history of Barwon Park was the visit of Prince Alfred, Duke of Edinburgh, on Tuesday, 3 December 1867, during his official tour of Australia. Prince Alfred was the first member of the British royal family to visit the Australian colonies, and his journey attracted widespread public attention.

The Prince arrived in Winchelsea at 1:15 pm after having passed through Geelong and the Barrabool Hills, where he laid the capstone for the Winchelsea Bridge. After the ceremony, the Duke of Edinburgh had lunch with Thomas Austin and his family, where they, and a small party, went out to hunt rabbits. Within three and a half hours, around 1,000 rabbits were shot, and the Duke of Edinburgh shot 416. The Prince left the house in the afternoon on Wednesday, 4 December en route to Colac.

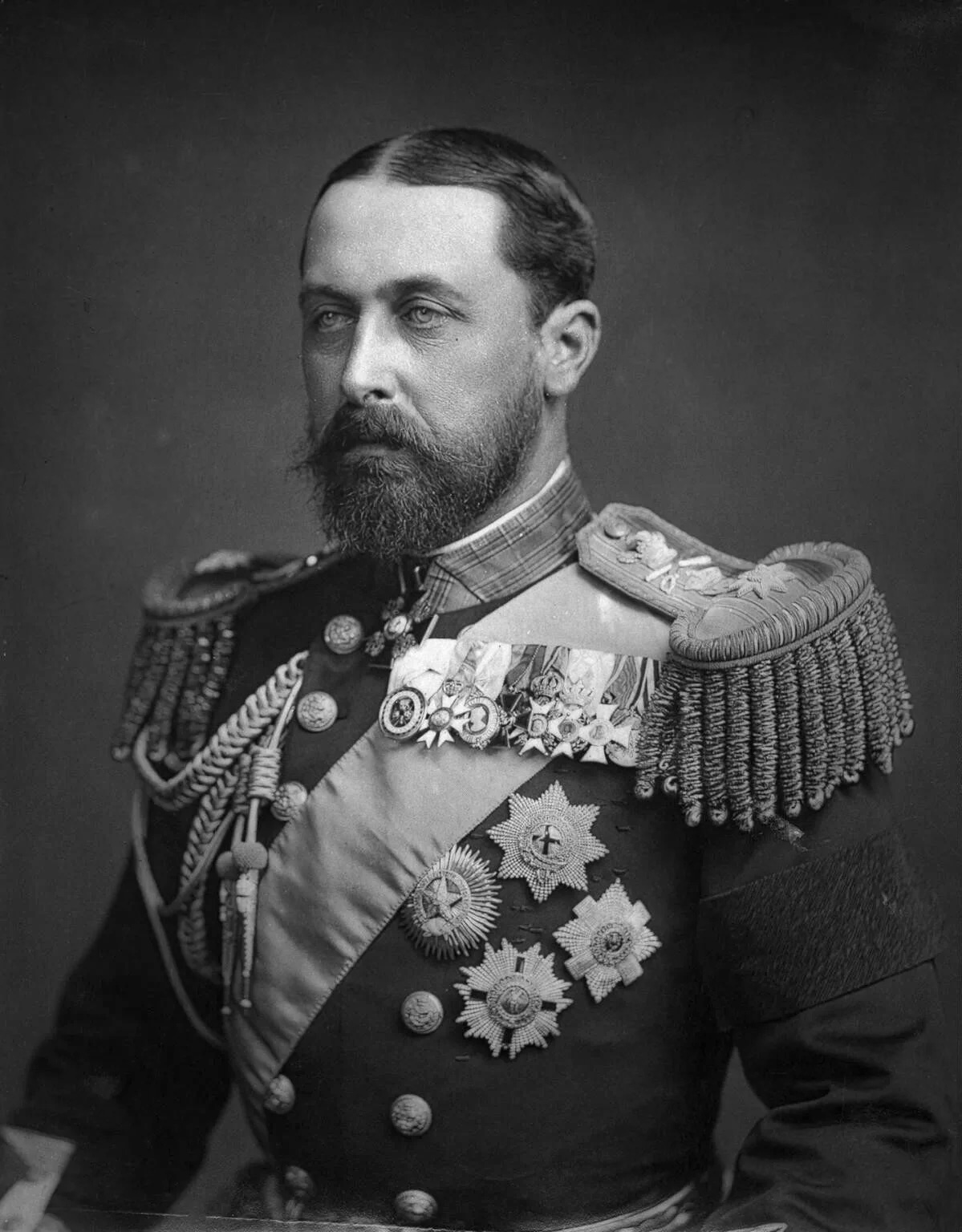
H.R.H. Prince Alfred, Duke of Edinburgh

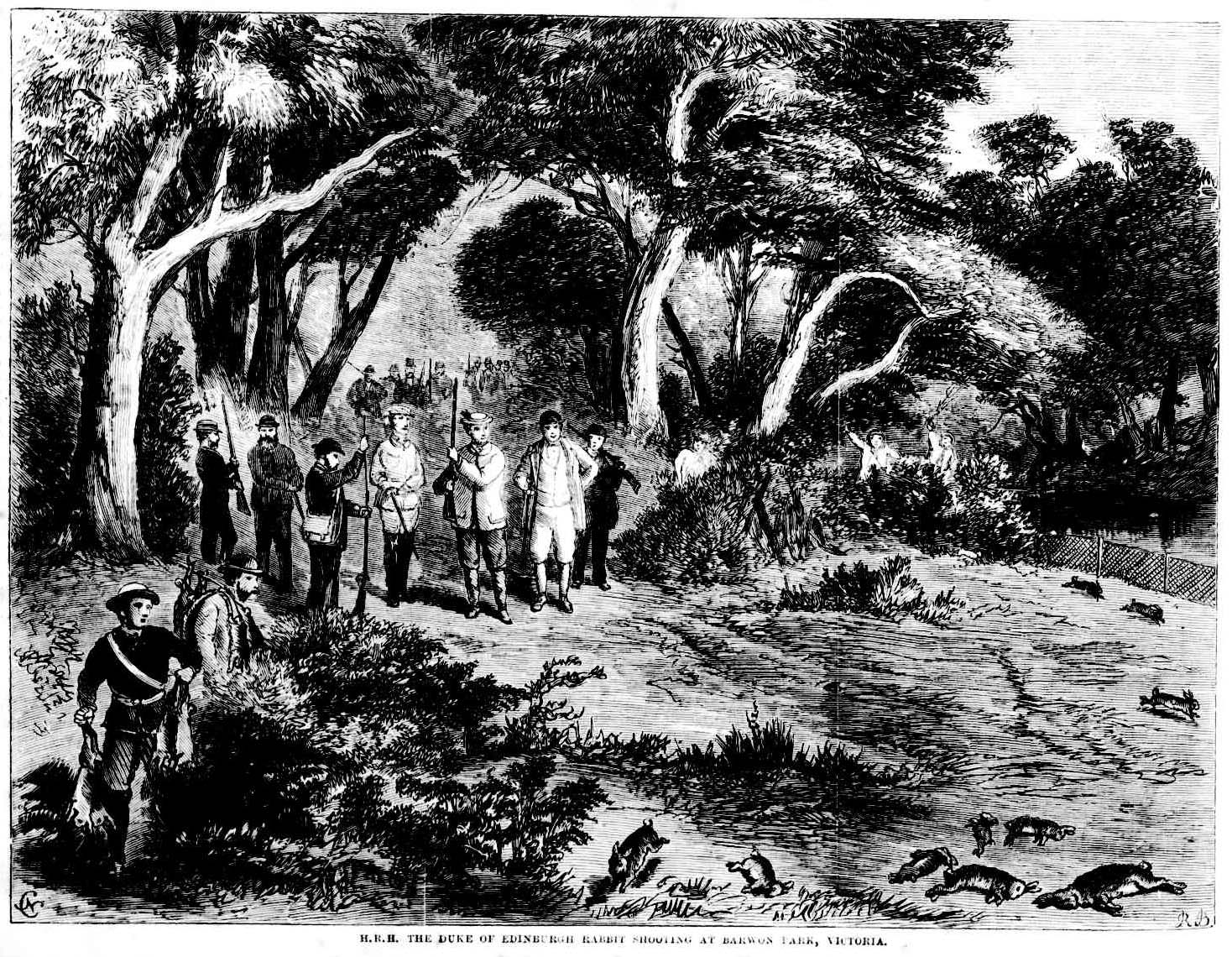
The rabbit shooting

At the time of the royal visit, the Austins were still living in their earlier homestead rather than the present mansion. Although the event was regarded as a great honour, it reportedly highlighted the limitations of the existing residence when hosting dignitaries of such rank. This experience is widely cited as a major factor influencing the decision to construct the new Barwon Park mansion shortly afterwards, designed to accommodate large gatherings and formal entertaining on a grand scale.

=== Construction of the mansion ===
Plans for the new Barwon Park mansion were prepared by the Geelong architectural firm Davidson & Henderson (George Henderson and Alexander Davidson) who designed a large Italianate residence. Construction commenced in 1869 and was completed in 1871, using locally quarried bluestone and high-quality imported materials for interior finishes. The last furniture arrived on a ship from London in March 1871.

The completed mansion consisted of 42 rooms arranged over two principal storeys, with additional basement and service areas. Architectural features include a symmetrical façade, deep verandahs with decorative cast-iron lacework, and a grand internal staircase. Internally, the house was fitted with ornate plasterwork, marble fireplaces, cedar joinery, and elaborate furnishings.

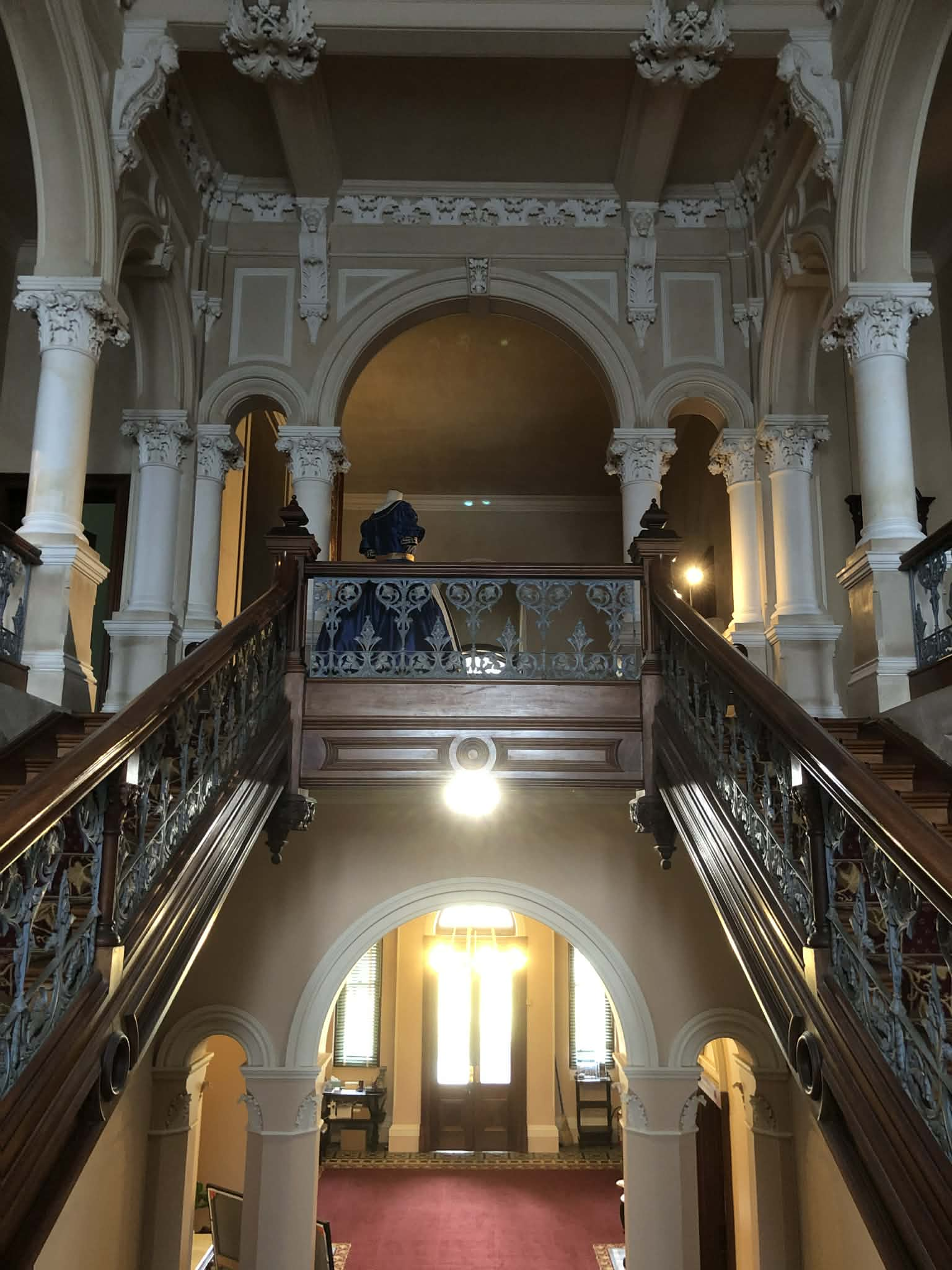
The staircase at Barwon Park

To mark the completion of the mansion, the Austins hosted a lavish ball on 30 June 1871, attended by guests from across Victoria. Great lengths were taken in the organisation of the ball, including a special train ran from Ballarat to Geelong, and hired and private coaches transporting over 170 guests. The driveway was lit up by interval-spaced burning lights, and the mansion was lit up by Chinese lanterns, and the dancing supposedly continued until dawn the next day.

A few months later, Thomas Austin's health began to decline rapidly. Thomas became seriously ill after cutting his finger while tending to his horses, with the cut becoming infected. On 15 December 1871, he had to get the finger amputated, and went to visit his daughter's husband, who was a doctor working in Ballarat. Whilst there, it became infected again, and subsequently passed away. His funeral took place on 18 December and was one of the largest in Victoria at the time. His widow, Elizabeth, continued to live at Barwon Park for nearly four decades, managing the household. Elizabeth became one of Victoria's most significant female philanthropists, using her wealth to support charitable causes, particularly in health and welfare. Her most enduring legacy was the establishment of the Austin Hospital for Incurables (now the Austin Hospital) in Heidelberg in 1882, one of Melbourne's major public hospitals. She also funded housing and welfare initiatives in Geelong, including the Austin Hall, a series of widows homes beside South Geelong railway station. She remained at Barwon Park until her death in 1910, after which the contents of the mansion were dispersed at auction.

=== The Batson family ownership ===
Following Elizabeth Austin's death, Barwon Park was sold in 1912 to Stephen Batson, who, alongside his parents, had previously worked for the Austin family as a station manager. The Batsons continued to operate the property as a pastoral enterprise while occupying the mansion as a family home. Over time, parts of the original estate were subdivided or sold.

The last private owners were Sydney Edward Batson and his sisters, who lived at Barwon Park until the late 1960s. Recognising the historical importance of the property and the increasing difficulty of maintaining such a large house, Sydney Batson bequeathed Barwon Park to the National Trust of Australia (Victoria) in 1969, subject to life tenancy provisions for his sisters.

=== National Trust ownership and conservation ===
The National Trust assumed full control of Barwon Park in the early 1970s and undertook extensive conservation and restoration works to stabilise the mansion and adapt it for public access. Restoration efforts have included roof repairs, structural stabilisation, conservation of plasterwork and joinery, and the gradual re-furnishing of rooms using original items repurchased or donated by descendants and supporters. The grounds, gardens and outbuildings have also been conserved to reflect their historical layout and function. Today, Barwon Park operates as a house museum, hosting guided tours, educational programs, and cultural events, and is widely regarded as one of the most intact pastoral mansions in Victoria.

== See also ==
- Barunah Plains Homestead
- St Thomas' Anglican Church, Winchelsea
- Buda Historic Home & Garden
- Cooks' Cottage
- Ingleby
- Murdeduke
- Narrapumelap
- Rippon Lea Estate
- The Heights (Geelong)
- Werribee Park
- Winchelsea
- Wormbete
