= Elizabeth Austin (Australian pioneer) =

Australian pioneer and philanthropist

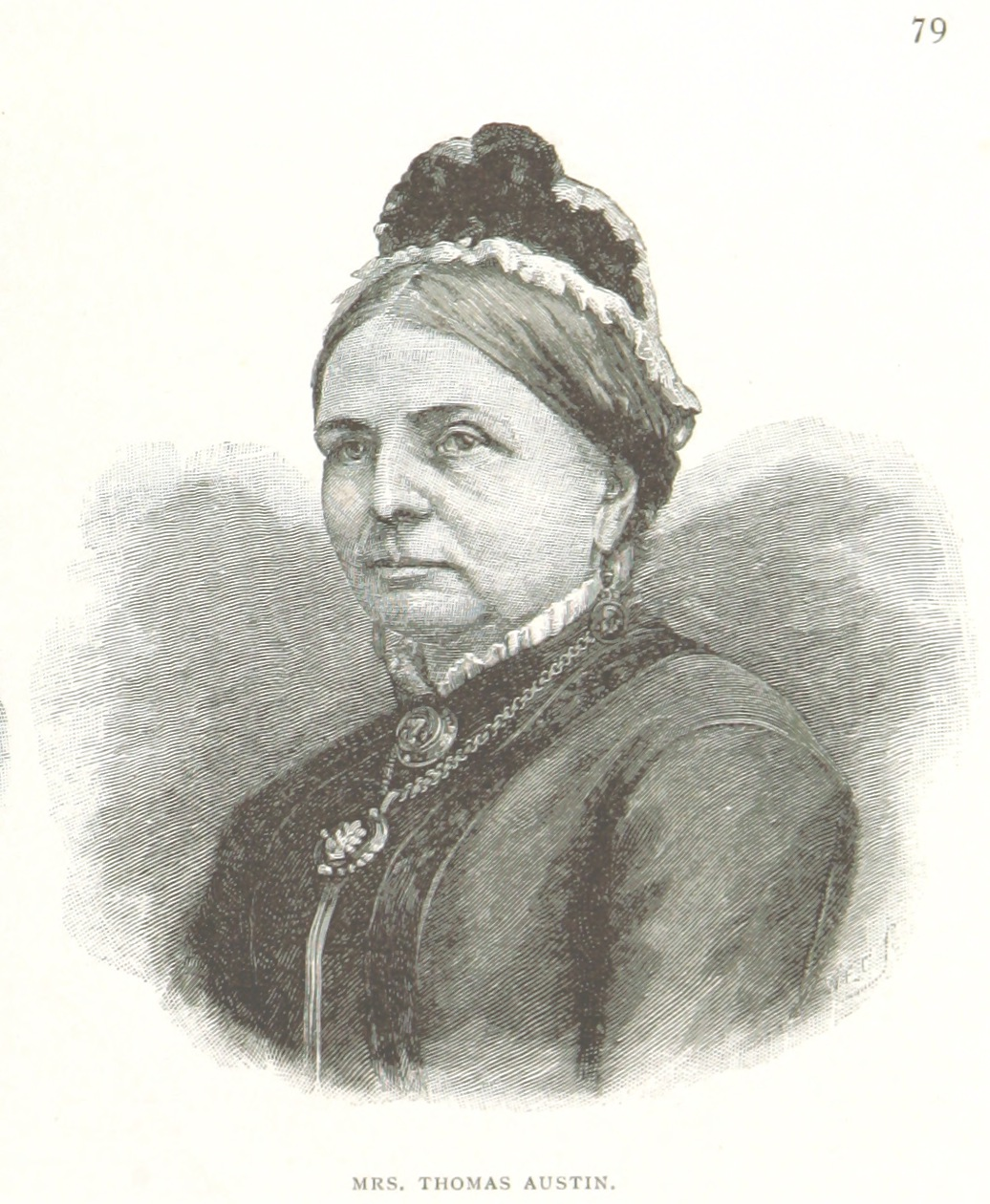
- Born: Elizabeth Phillips Harding; August 14, 1821; The Chinnocks, Somerset, England
- Died: September 2, 1910 (aged 89); Winchelsea, Victoria, Australia
- Known for: benefactor
- Children: 11

Elizabeth Phillips Austin, (née Harding; 14 August 1821 — 2 September 1910), was an Australian pioneer and philanthropist, who endowed hospitals in the state of Victoria.

== Life ==
Austin was born at Middle Chinnock, Somerset, England to parents, Robert Harding, yeoman farmer, and his wife Mary, née Phillips. Alongside her brother, William, they took passage to Port Phillip District, Australia in 1841 and squatted land near Winchelsea.

On 14 August 1845 she married Thomas Austin who had also migrated from Somerset. They had eleven children with three dying in infancy. They were successful in sheep farming and owned several 'runs' becoming a notable family of the district. They received a visit from the Duke of Edinburgh to their homestead in 1867. Reportedly the Austins had felt embarrassed by this visit and felt they needed a grander home for hosting guests. In 1869-71 they built a mansion at Barwon Park, designed by Davidson & Henderson. Only months later, Thomas died and Austin continued to reside at the mansion until her death.

== Philanthropist ==
After witnessing the death of a servant from an incurable disease, Austin offered £6,000 from her inheritance towards the setting up of a hospital for "incurables" in Melbourne. The Austin Hospital for Incurables was opened on 21 January 1882 and, in 1892, with her continued financial support, a children's ward was established. She supported this institution for the rest of her life and created similar hospitals in other parts of Victoria.

In celebration of the Queen Victoria's jubilee in 1887, Austin founded the Elizabeth Austin Cottages for "the female aged poor" at South Geelong. Along with many local charities she gave funds to the Servants' Training Institute, St Thomas's Church, Winchelsea, and the Ladies' Benevolent Society. Shortly before her death, she gave a cheque of 100 guineas for the Geelong King Edward Memorial Clock fund.

== Death and legacy ==
Austin died on 2 September 1910 at Winchelsea. She had a civic funeral and was buried in Geelong cemetery in a French Gothic designed vault.

Austin was inducted onto the Victorian Honour Roll of Women in 2012.
