= Newtown, Victoria =

Coordinates: 38°09′00″S 144°19′59″E

Newtown
- Suburb
- Interactive map of Newtown
- Country: Australia
- State: Victoria
- City: Geelong
- LGA: City of Greater Geelong

Government
  - State electorate: Geelong
  - Federal division: Corio

Population
  - Total: 10,445 (2021 census)
- Postcode: 3220
Suburbs around Newtown
Fyansford and Herne Hill	Manifold Heights and Geelong West	Geelong CBD
Highton	Newtown	South Geelong
Highton	Belmont	Belmont

Newtown is an inner western suburb of Geelong, Victoria, Australia. At the 2021 census, Newtown had a population of 10,445. It is a primarily residential area occupying one of the highest points of urban Geelong. It has always been a desirable place of residence and is the location of many of Geelong's oldest and most valuable properties.

The locality of Chilwell is part of Newtown, and together Newtown and Chilwell were a municipality from 1858 to 1993 after which they were amalgamated with other municipalities to form the City of Greater Geelong in 1993.

== History ==
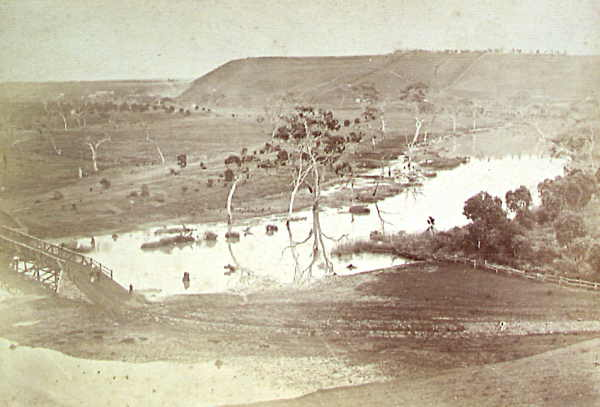
Queens Park, on the Barwon River, 1866.

Chilwell Post Office opened here on 1 April 1912 (closing in 1993). Bareena Post Office opened in 1911 in the area and remains open.

The Geelong Highland Gathering is an annual Highland Games held at Queens Park and first began in the 1850s.

=== Heritage listed sites ===
Newtown contains a number of heritage listed sites, including:

- 7 Aberdeen Street, Aberdeen Street Baptist Church
- 263 Pakington Street, Armytage House
- 35-43 Riversdale Road, Barwon Bank
- 25 Fernleigh Street, Barwon Grange
- 143 Noble Street, Claremont
- 3 Aberdeen Street, Former Aberdeen Street Baptist Church
- 20 Talbot Street, Geelong College
- 35 Aphrasia Street, Eythorne
- 275 Pakington Street, Keyham
- 145 Noble Street, Miharo
- 14 Aphrasia Street, Milton
- 35 Noble Street, Noble Street Uniting Church
- 50B Skene Street, Rannoch House
- 61 Retreat Road, Sacred Heart Convent of Mercy and Sacred Heart College
- 262 Latrobe Terrace, St Leonards
- 140 Aphrasia Street, The Heights

== Sport and recreation ==
Queens Park is also the home ground for the Newtown and Chilwell Cricket Club, the most successful team in the Geelong Cricket Association in terms of senior premierships won. The club uses both Stinton Oval (turf) and Shaw Oval (hard wicket). The Queens Park Sporting Complex is currently being refurbished by the City of Greater Geelong and will greatly improve both playing and social facilities for the club. Famous cricketers who have played for Newtown include Lindsay Hassett, Aaron Finch and Ian Redpath. Bob Merriman, the former chairman of Cricket Australia, began his administrative career at Newtown and Chilwell Cricket Club.

The suburb is also home to the Geelong Amateur Football Club who also use Stinton Oval during the winter months. They play in the Bellarine Football League.

The suburb in conjunction with neighbouring area Chilwell has an Australian Rules football team competing in the Geelong Football League, as also does Saint Josephs.

== Parks and open space ==
Queens Park, in a valley beside the Barwon River, is home to the picturesque 18 hole Queens Park Golf Course, located between Fyansford, Highton and Newtown. Newtown has several other important parks, including Balyang Sanctuary, Chilwell Gardens, Windmill Reserve, Fyans Park, Zillah Crawcour Park and Frier Reserve.

== Education ==
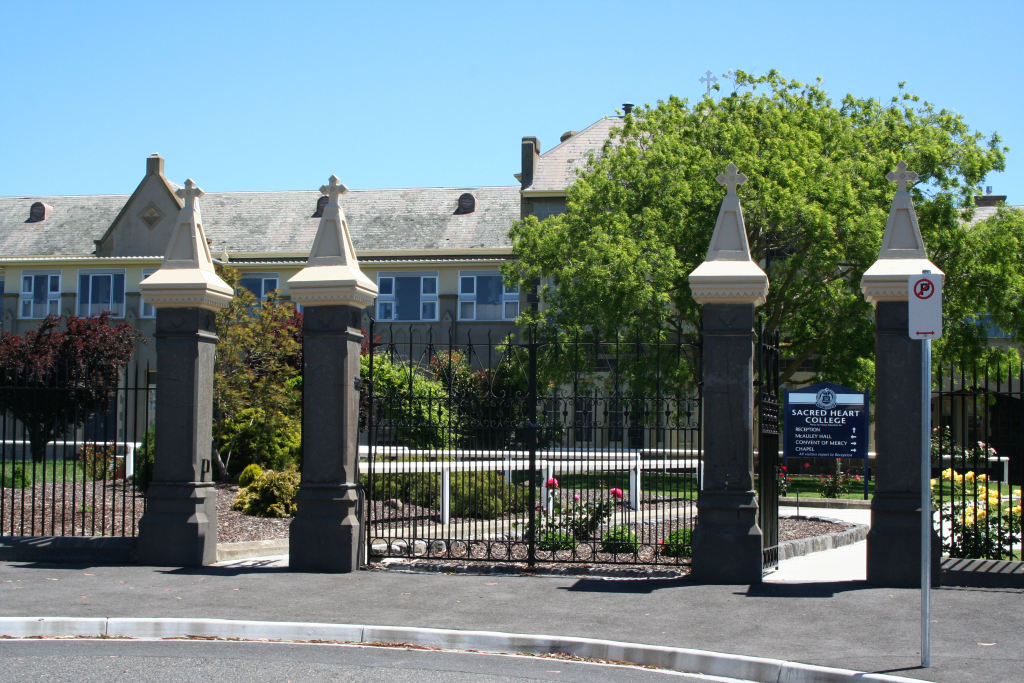
Sacred Heart College on Retreat Road

Newtown is home to three major private secondary schools: Sacred Heart College (an all-girls school), St. Josephs College (an all-boys school) and The Geelong College (co-educational).

== Notable people ==
- John Campbell Ross, Australian supercentenarian
