= Thomas Austin (pastoralist) =

English settler to Australia (1815–1871)

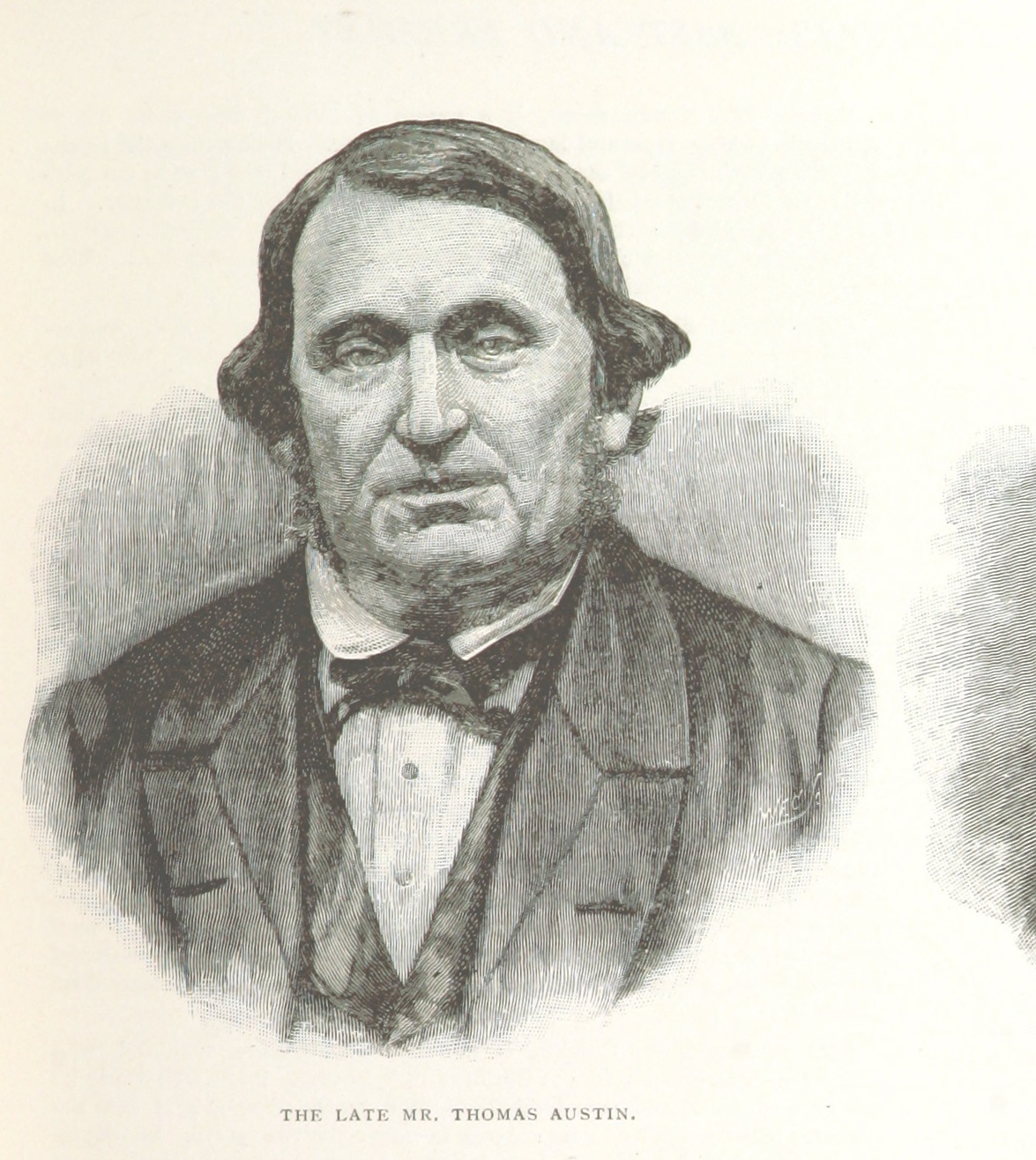
An 1888 illustration of Austin

Thomas Austin (1815 – 15 December 1871) was an English settler in Australia who is generally noted for the introduction of rabbits into Australia in 1859. While there were earlier transports of domestic Rabbits to Australia as early as the First Fleet, contemporary DNA testing demonstrated that Australia's modern rabbit populations are overwhelmingly descended from the wild-caught Rabbits released onto Austin's property in Victoria.

== Personal life ==
Thomas Austin was born at Baltonsborough, Somerset, England, the youngest son of John Austin and Nancy, née Lucas. In 1831 he arrived with other members of his family in Hobart Town, Van Diemen's Land (now Tasmania).

Along with his uncle and cousin, Austin established the first ferry crossing the River Derwent in the township which is now Austin's Ferry. After farming near Ouse, Thomas and his brother James crossed Bass Strait in 1837 and settled as pioneer pastoralists in the Western District of the Port Phillip District (now called Victoria).

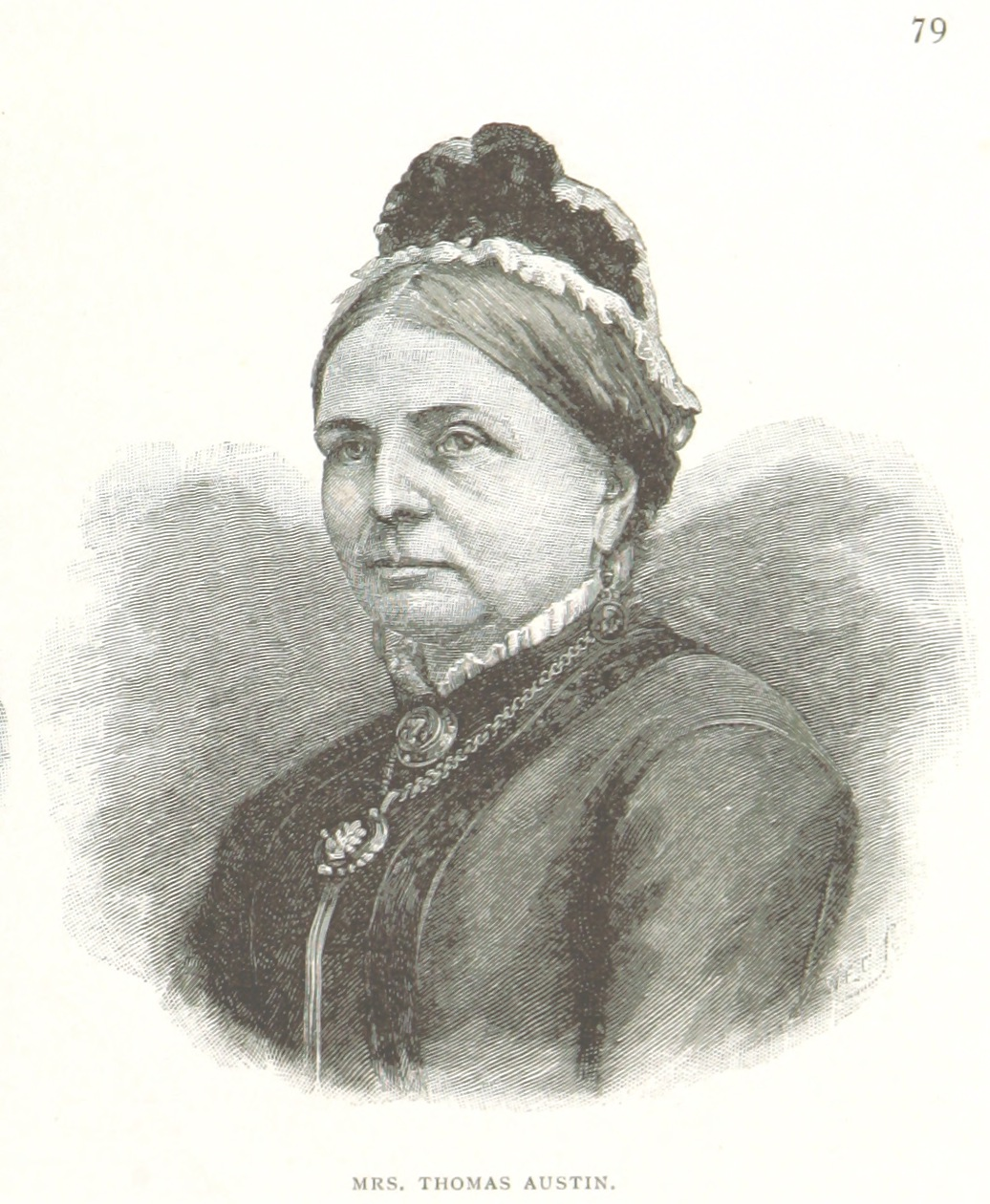
Elizabeth Phillips Harding, wife of Thomas Austin

In 1845 he married Elizabeth Phillips Harding (1821–1910) in Melbourne; they had 11 children.

== Barwon Park ==
Thomas Austin took up land near Winchelsea, Victoria starting in 1837, and eventually created a run of 29,000 acres (12,000 ha) known as Barwon Park. The property was used for sheep and for horse training.

In 1871, work was completed on the bluestone mansion that Austin designed and built on his property. The mansion is now owned by the National Trust of Australia and is open to the public. Austin died six months after the mansion was completed, but his widow continued to live there and, as a philanthropist, helped found the Austin Hospital in Heidelberg and the Austin Homes for Women in Geelong.

== Introduction of species ==
As a member of the Acclimatisation Society of Victoria, Thomas Austin helped to introduce many species from England. In 1861, he wrote that he had introduced hares, blackbirds and thrushes, and that he was breeding English wild rabbits and partridges.

In October 1859, he introduced 24 breeding rabbits (Oryctolagus cuniculus) on his estate as game for shooting parties. While other settlers praised his efforts at the time, he has borne the brunt of blame for introducing this pest to Australia. In 2022, a study of genomic data confirmed Australia's feral rabbit population was entirely descended from the rabbits introduced by Austin.

== See also ==
- Rabbits in Australia

== Bibliography ==
- Australian Dictionary of Biography – Thomas Austin
- Australian Dictionary of Biography – Elizabeth Austin
- Australian Heritage (Autumn 2006) article on Thomas Austin & rabbits
