= Austin Hospital =

- Austin Health
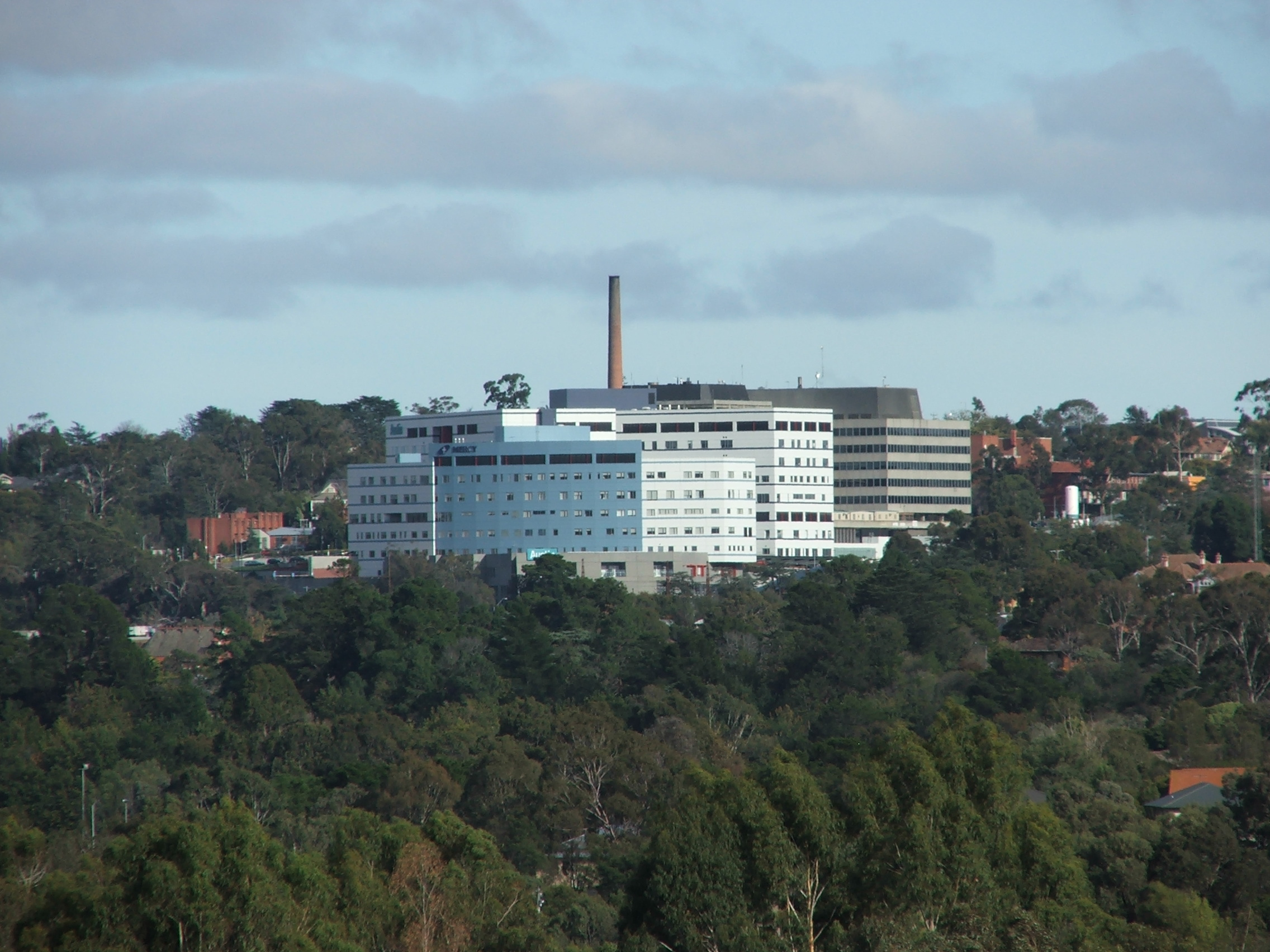
- Austin & Mercy Hospital complex

Geography
- Location: Melbourne, Victoria, Australia
- Coordinates: 37°45′23″S 145°03′30″E

Organisation
- Care system: Public Medicare (AU)
- Type: Teaching

Services
- Emergency department: Yes
- Beds: 671

History
- Founded: 1882

Links
- Website: www.austin.org.au/austin-hospital/
- Lists: Hospitals in Australia

The Austin Hospital is a public teaching hospital in Melbourne's north-eastern suburb of Heidelberg, and is administered by Austin Health, along with the Heidelberg Repatriation Hospital and the Royal Talbot Rehabilitation Centre.

== History ==
The Austin Hospital for Incurables was founded in 1882 as a charitable institution by Elizabeth Austin, the widow of Thomas Austin. It had several name changes before becoming the Austin Hospital.

=== War and post-war ===
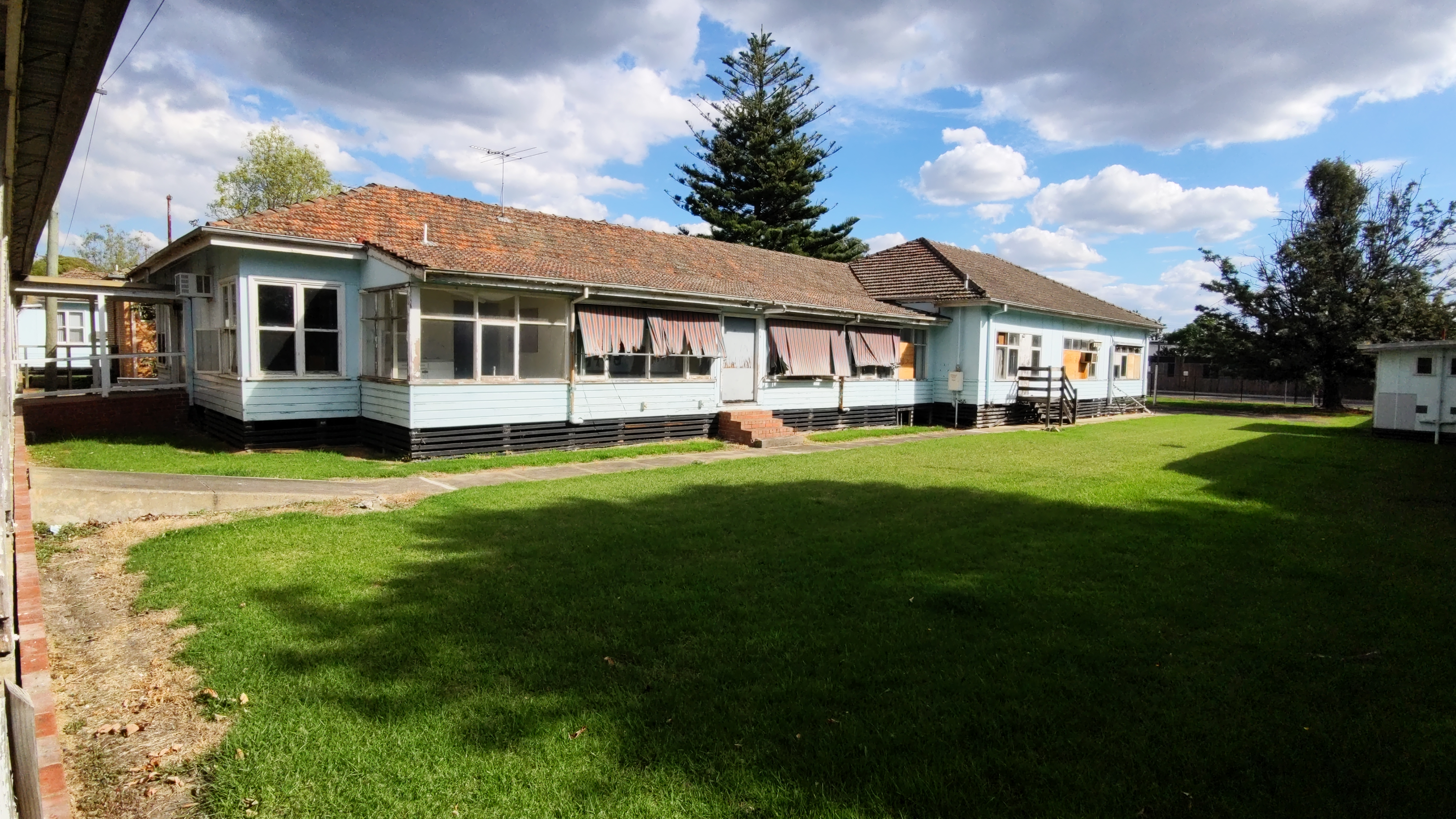
Abandoned wards at Heidelberg Repatriation Hospital in 2023.

During World War II, two military hospitals were located at the site — the 115th Australian General Hospital, operated by the Australian Army, between 13 March 1941 and 19 May 1947, and the 6th RAAF Hospital, operated by the Royal Australian Air Force, between 1942 and 1947.

The Australian Army handed over the military hospital to the Repatriation Commission on 19 May 1947, and the hospital then became known as the Repatriation General Hospital Heidelberg. The Repatriation Commission (Department of Veterans' Affairs) operated the hospital until 31 December 1994. In the decade leading up to transfer of the hospital to the state hospital system the name was modified to Heidelberg Repatriation Hospital.

=== State Government operation ===
The Austin Hospital was transferred into the Victorian health system on 1 January 1995, with Heidelberg Repatriation Hospital and Austin Hospital amalgamating on 1 April 1995 to become the Austin & Repatriation Medical Centre - "Victoria's largest tertiary referral centre providing a broad range of patient services whilst enhancing established teaching and research profiles".

In 1996 plans by the Victorian State Government of Jeff Kennett to privatise the hospital were leaked to the press. There was much community disquiet over this decision, and confidential reports on the privatisation were withheld from public scrutiny. Most hospital staff opposed this plan, but being bound by confidentiality agreements dared not speak out publicly fearing for their own jobs. The Labor Party pledged its opposition to the privatisation proposal. With the surprise election in 1999 of Steve Bracks, a minority Labor Government was formed with the support of three Independents. Immediately, privatisation plans for the hospital were shelved, and funding increased.

In August 2000 the Victorian Government announced the redevelopment of the Austin Hospital and incorporating the relocation of the Mercy Hospital for Women (MHW) from East Melbourne to Heidelberg. This public project was the largest hospital redevelopment ever undertaken in Victoria, and one of the largest in Australia, costing $376 million.

=== 2003 onwards ===
On 30 April 2003, the Austin changed its name from the Austin & Repatriation Medical Centre (A&RMC) to Austin Health. In January 2005, Dr Brendan Murphy was appointed CEO, and on 7 May 2005, the Mercy Hospital for Women fulfilled a long-term plan and finally opened at Heidelberg.

== Clinical services ==
The hospital provides the only Victorian-wide service for acute spinal injuries, liver transplant and is the state referral centre for toxicology. It has a Statewide psychiatry unit for young children (under 12), the Eagle Child Unit (now called Statewide Child Unit). The Victorian Respiratory Support Service (VRSS) is also located at Austin Hospital. Austin Hospital is one of two major teaching hospitals in Melbourne which maintain a filmless radiology department using PACS.

The Austin Health Vascular Surgery Unit is a quaternary referral centre for complex cases and vascular surgical research, and is home to one of the first specialist Vascular Ultrasound laboratories in Australia.

Austin Health is a major centre for kidney transplantation in Victoria and participates in the Australian and New Zealand Kidney Exchange (ANZKX) program.

The hospital maintains one of the busiest Thoracic Surgical Units in Australia and also offers an extensive rehabilitation service at the Royal Talbot Rehabilitation Centre in Kew.

The Plastic and Reconstructive Surgery Unit is recognised for world-leading surgical techniques in nerve reconstruction surgery.

== Teaching and education ==
The Austin Clinical School opened to medical students in October 1967. Since then The University of Melbourne Departments of Medicine, Surgery, Psychiatry, Psychology and Physiotherapy have established at Austin Health, with other tertiary institutions affiliated including Royal Melbourne Institute of Technology, and La Trobe University for allied health programs. Teaching and training is also offered to students from Monash University, Deakin University, Swinburne University of Technology, Victoria University of Technology and the Australian Catholic University.

Other research institutes affiliated with the Austin Health include the National Stroke Research Institute (NSRI), neurosciences research with the Brain Research Institute (BRI), epilepsy research with the Epilepsy Research Institute (ERI), Australian Centre for Post-traumatic Mental Health, and the Biological Research Laboratory (BRL) which is a commercial supplier of animals for research establishments.

== Cancer centre ==
The treatment of cancer is particularly important with the most comprehensive cancer service in the Southern Hemisphere with the largest Positron Emission Tomography (PET) service in Victoria. Cancer research based at the hospital is conducted by Ludwig Cancer Research. The Olivia Newton-John Cancer Wellness and Research Centre is based on the Austin Heidelberg site covering 24,000m2. It was completed in late 2012 and opened in 2013 as the result of a combination of government and philanthropic support, as well as donations from 200,000 members of the public totalling $17 million. Total estimated costs were $185 million and its "green" design was accoladed with multiple awards. On January 1, 2015, the former Ludwig Institute for Cancer Research based at the ONJ centre was closed and renamed the Olivia Newton-John Cancer Research Institute.

== 3D printing laboratory ==
The Austin Health 3D Medical Printing Laboratory is run in conjunction with The University of Melbourne, as the first multidisciplinary, hospital-based medical 3D printing facility in Australia, supporting a range of clinical, teaching and research activities, including during the COVID-19 pandemic.
