= Grimwade =

Grimwade is a family name of British origin which includes members of a prominent Australian family; it may refer to:

- Sir Andrew Grimwade (born 1930), Australian chemical engineer, philanthropist and cattle breeder
- Arthur Grimwade (1913-2002), British antiquarian
- Darren Grimwade (born 1980), Australian politician
- Fred Grimwade (1933–1989), Australian politician
- Frederick Sheppard Grimwade (1840–1910), Australian businessman and Victorian parliamentarian
- Harold Grimwade (1869–1949), Australian Army officer
- Peter Grimwade (1942–1990), British television writer and director
- Philip Grimwade (1912–1961), Australian politician
- Russell Grimwade (1879–1955) (Wilfrid Russell Grimwade), Australian chemist, botanist, industrialist and philanthropist.
- Grimwade, Western Australia, a locality, formally known as East Kirup, located in south-West WA.

== Etymology ==
The origin of the name Grimwade is derived of Anglo-Saxon origin, however its meaning remains a mystery.

Grim- derives from the Anglo-Saxon word Grimr or Grim - an alias for Wōden the God of War and Magic, also referred to as Odin in Norse mythology. For example, the Anglo-Saxons often attributed Grim to predating landmarks that they assumed were created by Wōden, such as Grim's Ditch. Grim can also refer to a mask or visor on a helmet. Whereas -wade likely derives from the Anglo-Saxon word wadan, meaning "to travel", "to go", or "to advance". However, -wade could also possibly derive from the Anglo-Saxon word ward, meaning "guardian", "protector", or "sentry". Therefore, Grimwade may refer to one who travels or goes with Wōden, or may be an occupational name referring to a visored guardian or sentry".

== See also ==
- Grimwade House, Melbourne Grammar School, Australia
