= Grimwade House, Rye =

Heritage-listed house in Melbourne, Victoria, Australia

Grimwade House
- Location of the house in Greater Metropolitan Melbourne
- Interactive map of the Grimwade House area

General information
- Status: Completed
- Type: House
- Architectural style: Modernist pavilion
- Location: 28–54 Dundas Street, Rye, Mornington Peninsula, Melbourne, Victoria, Australia
- Coordinates: 38°22′27″S 144°49′01″E
- Year built: 1961–1962
- Completed: 1962; 64 years ago
- Client: Geoffrey Grimwade and family
- Owner: Grimwade family

Technical details
- Material: Western red cedar; rubble limestone; vermiculite; clay; stramit; vinyl; rattan
- Floor area: 2,000 m^{2} (22,000 sq ft)
- Grounds: 3.79 ha (9.4 acres)

Design and construction
- Architect: David McGlashan
- Architecture firm: McGlashan and Everist
- Awards: Victorian Architecture Medal (1963)

Victorian Heritage Register
- Official name: Grimwade House
- Type: Registered place
- Designated: 14 May 2009
- Reference no.: H2209
- Heritage overlay no.: HO345
- Category: Residential buildings (private)

Grimwade House is a house located at 28–54 Dundas Street in Rye, on the Mornington Peninsula, in the south eastern suburbs of Melbourne, in Victoria, Australia.

Built in 1962 on the traditional lands of the Bunurong people, the house was added to the Victorian Heritage Register on 14 May 2009 in recognition of its architectural and aesthetic significance; and was also identified for a future addition to a non-statutory list by the Victorian branch of the National Trust.

== History ==
The Grimwade House was constructed in 1961–1962 for Geoffrey Holt Grimwade CMG (1902–1961), his wife and their four daughters. Grimwade was a highly influential Victorian business leader, whose family was associated with Cuming, Smith & Co., Drug Houses of Australia, and Commonwealth Industrial Gases, later, ICI Australia. Grimwade was one of the founders of the Institute of Public Affairs, served on the boards of the Australian Mutual Provident Society, the Commonwealth Bank of Australia, the Walter and Eliza Hall Institute of Medical Research, and other organisations, and was described as one of the ablest businessmen of his generation.

Grimwade's untimely death in 1961 prevented the house becoming his retirement home, and was subsequently owned and used by his wife and daughters and their families.

Opened to the public for the first time in November 2025, the ten-bedroom house, with parking for ten cars, was listed for sale in January 2026, with expectations of between A$11–$12 million.

=== Other Grimwade family homes ===
Other holiday homes and estate on, or near, the Mornington Peninsula, also listed on the Victorian Heritage Register, owned by members of the Grimwade family include Coolart estate inclusive of a Victorian Second Empire mansion, built by the Hon. Frederick Sheppard Grimwade MLC who owned the estate between 1895 and 1905, subsequently purchased by the Victorian Government and managed by Parks Victoria as a homestead, wetlands, nature reserve, and historic house museum; Marathon, in Mount Eliza, built from 1914 by Major General Harold William Grimwade CB CMG VD and owned by the family, until the family subdivided the 12-hectare (30-acre) estate in the 1950s and sold the Federation Arts and Crafts house and gardens in mid-1992; and Westerfield, in Frankston South, built from 1924 by Sir Russell Grimwade CBE, set on 45 hectares (110 acres), also completed in the Arts and Crafts style.

In the Melbourne suburb of Caulfield North, the Hon. F. S. Grimwade built Harleston in 1875 in a Victorian Filigree style, located on the corner of Balaclava and Orrong roads later called Grimwade House and acquired by Melbourne Grammar School in c. 1911 – c. 1918, subsequently used as a preparatory campus.

== Description ==
Grimwade House was built as Geoffrey Grimwade's retirement home that could also serve as a holiday house. Set on 3.79 hectares (9.4 acres) at Rye, located on a sandy ridge about 500 metres (1,600 ft) from Port Phillip Bay, the house is hidden from view by the extensive natural bush of melaleucas and casuarinas.

The 2,000-square-metre (22,000 sq ft) house was designed by David McGlashan, (Note: David McGlashan was Geoffrey Grimwade's son-in-law.) of McGlashan and Everist, in the Modernist pavilion style, on a three-metre (ten-foot) module. The house comprises five flat-roofed pavilions, linked by covered ways, which create a variety of sheltered outdoor courtyards between the wings. The walls are constructed of vertical western red cedar boards weathered to natural grey, rubble limestone quarried on the site, extensive floor to ceiling glass and sliding panels, with the main bedroom wing having a generous breezeway with flywire panels on one side. The main wing has vermiculite ceilings and clay tile floors, while the other wings have Stramit (a wheat straw board) ceilings and vinyl floor coverings. Rattan blinds are used throughout the house. Apart from lawn and areas paved with stone and clay tiles immediately around the house, the site has retained its natural bushland appearance.

The house, which shows the influence of Japanese architecture, is designed to sit comfortably within the natural bush landscape. It shows a creative and radical approach to siting, form, planning, and use of materials. Its separate pavilions are sited to create different sheltered courtyards or outdoor rooms, and to provide for maximum flexibility and privacy. The paved area extending in clay tiles from the main living area into the garden helps to blur the distinction between inside and out. The sunshading allows winter sun to penetrate but excludes summer sun, and natural ventilation is abundant, with a large fly-screened breezeway linking the living and main bedroom wing. McGlashan, the architect, also designed a large part of the original furniture including tables, benches, and sofas.

The Grimwade House was published in Architecture in Australia in 1964, following the awarding of the Victorian Architecture Medal for 1963. It led directly to other commissions for McGlashan and Everist, including John and Sunday Reed's house at Aspendale, and then Heide II, and established the architects' reputations as designers of beautifully-sited, elegantly minimal houses, with a distinctly Australian character.

== See also ==
- Architecture of Melbourne
- List of places on the Victorian Heritage Register in the Shire of Mornington Peninsula
