= Westerfield (disambiguation) =

Westerfield is a village in Suffolk, England

Westerfield may also refer to:

== Places ==
- Westerfield railway station, railway station in Westerfield, England
- Westerfield, New Zealand, in Ashburton District
- Westerfield, Shetland, coastal community in Scotland
- Westerfield (house), a heritage-listed house in Frankston, Melbourne, Victoria, Australia

== People ==
- David Westerfield (born 1952), American murderer convicted of killing Danielle van Dam in 2002
- Dena Westerfield (born 1971), American bodybuilder
- H. Bradford Westerfield (1928-2008), Italian professor
- James Westerfield (1913-1971), American actor
- Ken Westerfield (born 1947), American frisbee disc player
- Louis Westerfield (1949-1996), American lawyer
- Richard Westerfield, American conductor
- Samuel Z. Westerfield Jr. (1919-1972), American foreign services officer
- Whitney Westerfield (born 1980), American politician

== Other ==
- Westervelt massacre (also known as the Westerfield massacre), a 1780 indigenous attack on Dutch frontier settlers in Kentucky

== See also ==
- Westerfeld
- Westerveld
- Westerveld (surname)
