= Marathon (house) =

Heritage-listed house in Melbourne, Victoria, Australia

- Location of the house in Greater Metropolitan Melbourne

General information
- Status: Completed
- Type: House
- Architectural style: Federation Arts and Crafts
- Location: 12 Marathon Drive, Mount Eliza, Mornington Peninsula, Melbourne, Victoria, Australia
- Coordinates: 38°09′50″S 145°05′53″E
- Year built: 1913–1914
- Completed: 1914; 112 years ago
- Renovated: 1924
- Client: Harold Grimwade and family
- Owner: Grimwade family (1913–1992)

Technical details
- Material: Stuccoed bricks; timber; terracotta; glass; stone; concrete
- Floor count: 2
- Grounds: 13.5 ha (33 acres) (1913); 12 ha (30 acres) (1930); 2 ha (5 acres) (1953); 1.5 ha (3.7 acres) (as of 1993)

Design and construction
- Architects: Walter Butler (1913, 1924); Richard Butler (1924)
- Architecture firm: Butler and Bradshaw (1913)

Victorian Heritage Register
- Official name: Marathon
- Type: Registered place
- Designated: 16 December 1992
- Reference no.: H0946
- Heritage overlay no.: HO126
- Categories: Parks, Gardens and Trees; Residential buildings (private)

Register of the National Estate
- Official name: Marathon and Garden
- Type: Defunct register
- Designated: 22 June 1993
- Reference no.: 18580

Marathon is a house and garden estate, located at 12 Marathon Drive in Mount Eliza, on the Mornington Peninsula, in the south eastern suburbs of Melbourne, in Victoria, Australia.

Built in 1913 on the traditional lands of the Bunurong people, the house was added to the Victorian Heritage Register on 16 December 1992 in recognition of its historical and architectural significance; and was also added to non-statutory lists by the Victorian branch of the National Trust on 16 October 1991 and the now defunct Register of the National Estate on 22 June 1993.

The home of the prominent Melbourne Grimwade family, Marathon – both the house and its garden – are characteristic of the work of the architect, Walter Butler, completed in the Federation Arts and Crafts style.

== History ==
On 7 February 1854, James Davey (1811–92), a Cornish-born pastoralist, was granted a right to 259 hectares (640 acres) at Mount Eliza, and built a small residence. After achieving freehold title, Davey sold the cottage with 16 hectares (40 acres) to Francis (Frank) Sidney Stephen. Stephen built a larger house on the property, now known as Marathon, and made extensive planting on the land, down to Kackeraboite Creek, including an orchard. In the late 1890s the ownership of the property was taken over by Andrew Rowan, a son-in-law of Stephen.

In the early 1900s, Major General Harold William Grimwade CB CMG VD became the owner, and between 1913 and 1914, he had erected a large beachside holiday residence, built on the cliffs overlooking Davey's Bay, designed by the architectural partnership of Walter Butler and Ernest Bradshaw. Several years later, after World War I where Grimwade saw active service, in 1924, he re-engaged Butler, now in partnership with his nephew, Richard, to design substantial extensions to what was already a large residence.

Whilst the house was originally built for the Grimwade family as their summer residence, it was used as a permanent residence following the death of Harold Grimwade at Marathon in 1949, when his son, John F. T. Grimwade, became owner. In 1951, the Grimwade family subdivided their landholding into 23 blocks of between 2,000 to 10,100 square metres (0.5 to 2.5 acres), while retaining Marathon and part of the gardens, until the family sold in mid-1992. Marathon has a strong association with the Grimwade family, who were prominent in Melbourne commercial, social and intellectual circles.

In 1930, Marathon stood on 12 hectares (30 acres); and by 1953, the area had been reduced to two hectares (five acres). Although the garden has been reduced to 1.5 hectares (3.7 acres) and lost features including glass houses, it retains high historic integrity and is in good condition. The building has undergone many modifications but retention of most of the stonework and terracotta shingling has maintained some of the 1914 character. The building is in good condition.

=== Other Grimwade family homes ===
Other holiday homes and estate on, or near, the Mornington Peninsula, also listed on the Victorian Heritage Register, owned by members of the Grimwade family include Coolart estate inclusive of a Victorian Second Empire mansion, built by the Hon. Frederick Sheppard Grimwade MLC who owned the estate between 1895 and 1905, subsequently purchased by the Victorian Government and managed by Parks Victoria as a homestead, wetlands, nature reserve, and historic house museum; Grimwade House, in Rye, built in 1962 by Geoffrey Grimwade CMG and owned by the family; listed for sale in 2026; and Westerfield, in Frankston South, built from 1924 by Sir Russell Grimwade CBE, set on 45 hectares (110 acres), also completed in the Arts and Crafts style.

In the Melbourne suburb of Caulfield North, the Hon. F. S. Grimwade built Harleston in 1875 in a Victorian Filigree style, located on the corner of Balaclava and Orrong roads later called Grimwade House and acquired by Melbourne Grammar School in c. 1911 – c. 1918, subsequently used as a preparatory campus.

== Description ==
Marathon is a large residence and garden established in 1914, and expanded in 1924, in the Federation Arts and Crafts style. Walter Butler was instrumental in the initial and subsequent design of the house; and the gardens were also designed by Butler, with its formal terraces, axial layout, structures, stairs, walls, paths, pergolas and ornaments. The design of the garden reflects the Arts and Crafts philosophy of creating outdoor "rooms". It is a fine example of Butler's garden design, having the grandest plan and being the largest and most intact surviving work.

=== House ===
The two-storey house features a conspicuous gabled roof, a tall broad stuccoed chimney and contrasting textures of building fabric, typical of the Arts and Crafts style. The main elevation consisted of two Dutch-hipped roof bays, linked by a continuous terrace. This, in turn, linked to a broad open terrace supported between two main rubble (granite) stone piers, with two intermediate piers at ground level under the terrace. The terrace returned on the west side. These piers echo the extensive use of the local granite and freestone in the garden retaining walls, terraces, pergolas and stairways. A third roof gable was recessed back from the main pair and on the east face was the shingled and gabled porte cochere at ground level. Use of coloured (stained) external woodwork was widespread with weatherboarding to upper walls, louvred vents and vertical timber strapping limited to the gables, all being in a dark hue.

Picked out in a contrasting light tone were the gable panels and architraves to openings. Windows and doors were glazed in multiple panes. Adding to this display of natural timber and stone was the terracotta shingling which covered the terrace fascia and main roof and the stained hardwood shingling over the north-east window bay. Above that was the slatted balustrading (replaced in 1924).

The 1924 renovation changed the dark stained boarding to a Tudor like display of half timbering, with dark strapping set against rough cast stucco, apparently applied directly over the boarding. It also replaced the Dutch-hip at the north-east corner with a half timbered gable. The granite intermediate piers were extended to match the height of the main piers. A broad, stuccoed chimney which straddles one of the main gables was on the 1924 alteration drawing but in an Elizabethan brick multi stacked form, having been apparently rendered over, as noted in pencil on the 1924 drawing. At some time the eaves were removed from part of the roof between the main gable pair and a clumsy bulkhead introduced between them; the chimneys were further altered (stuccoed pots removed); the stained strapping painted over; one of the verandah piers (north east), the attached terracotta shingling and upper level verandah bay extensively modified; and the generously sized ground level verandah enclosed. As in 1924, the service yard of the house, with its undercroft garages and driveways, is overlooked by gabled upper level wings housing mainly servants' bedrooms.

=== Garden ===
Marathon is approached by a short driveway which opens into a formal entrance courtyard with a stone retaining wall and clipped cypress hedge which provide a contrast to the informality of the eucalypts lining the entrance drive. A large open gravel area stands in front of the house entrance. The main axis of the steep hillside site faces north-east towards Frankston and overlooks Port Phillip Bay.

The garden is strictly geometric, divided clearly into discrete rectangular rooms connected by handsome stone flights of steps, divided by stone retaining walls and given character by architectural details. The garden itself falls away from the north-east side of the house and can be thought of as seven distinctly separate areas. A long stepped lawn leads directly from the house straight to the lowest boundary of the garden, immediately establishing the degree of fall of the land. From this path, entrances lead to the terraced gardens and allow glimpses across the terraces to the sea beyond. Known as the Green Walk or Green Alley, this is the only area of the garden sufficiently sheltered from the sea and the winds and the afternoon sun to grow camellias and azaleas and spring bulbs. The full length of the path looking up to the house is now partly obscured by foliage. Beside the steep pathway, the garden descends the hill in broad comfortable terraces, each with its own character.

Immediately below the house, stone steps with ficus-covered balustrades cut through a grass bank and a stone retaining wall to reach the tennis court. The alignment of these steps initiates a strong central axis, which terminates at another more complex set of steps, under an arbour above the lowest main terrace; the lily pond terrace. What remains of the lattice fencing of the tennis court is now largely covered by climbing plants. Following the central axis, across the tennis court, the level drops again, marked with a low stone balustrade covered with ficus and a path with diamond set brick pavers divides two garden areas. On the land side is the swimming pool garden. Curved stone steps lead up from the swimming pool area to the axial path and across to a flower garden with stone flagged paths and a central fish pond and fountain. This garden is filled with flowering plants; rosemary, lavender, erigeron spp, gladioli and spiraea. Thymes grow between paving stones and pots of white petunias accentuate the symmetry of the geometric central design, as do slim cypresses rising from each corner flowerbed. Stone seats, set well back into luxuriant lavenders and overhung by wisteria, face one another on two sides of the garden. A retaining wall, topped by a vine-covered frame fence, conceals the next garden. Another set of stone steps between ivy-covered balustrades leads down on each side of a stone cove, from which water can fall into a lily pond with fish. This area has a secluded feeling; it is well-protected by cypresses and out of sight from the rest of the garden. Below this garden a stone gutter takes water to a lion mask on an even lower level, where a rough grass path marks the bottom boundary and gives glimpses between large palms and poplars and pittosporums of the coastline beyond.

In the lower part of the garden, cypresses mark the clifftop walk; this leads up to a paved lookout area, furnished with seats and a table, which features a view of Davey's Bay. A stone-edged pergola walk divides the lookout from the tennis court and leads to a shaded paved area beneath a large oak. From here a path and stone steps lead up again to the top of the grass bank beside the house. Flanking the west side of the house is a simple lawn with a stone wall, including two stone putti, divides the garden from the wilder growth of the cliff itself.

The style is also demonstrated in the garden design by the geometric compartmentalised areas, many with central axes, terracing and use of stone for steps and retaining walls. The garden style also integrates an uncommon Italian design influence by the use of cypresses, clipped hedges, fountains and statuary. The place is of exceptional interest being one of a few notable homes designed for the Grimwade family and it is one of a small group of large summer residences with extensive grounds erected in the first decade of the twentieth century. These were sited on the coast south of Melbourne and set the pattern for the development of the area. Marathon demonstrates design achievement in the extensive and elaborate garden design and in the large residence which integrated extensive renovations and additions, using natural materials. Marathon has aesthetic value derived from its dramatic seaside and clifftop setting, the sloping terraced site, the complementary architecture and garden elements and the foliage texture of mature garden plantings.

== See also ==
- Architecture of Melbourne
- List of places on the Victorian Heritage Register in the Shire of Mornington Peninsula
