= Andrew Grimwade =

Australian philanthropist (1930–2023)

Sir Andrew Sheppard Grimwade, CBE (26 November 1930 – 30 January 2023) was an Australian chemical engineer, scientist, philanthropist, businessman and cattle breeder. He was best known for his service for 15 years as honorary President of the National Gallery of Victoria, and 15 years honorary President of the Walter and Eliza Hall Institute of Medical Research. He was also involved in the trial known as the JetCorp fiasco.

== Family background ==
Andrew Grimwade was the son of Frederick Sheppard Grimwade, great-grandson of Frederick Sheppard Grimwade (founder of the Grimwade family fortune in Australia), and great-great-grandson of Edward Grimwade of Grimwade & Ridley & Company, London.

As pioneers of the pharmaceutical industry in Victoria, the Grimwade family established the glass industry, the sulphuric acid and super phosphate industries, and later the industrial gases industry. Following various mergers, purchases, and spin-offs, the firms founded or co-founded by Frederick Sheppard Grimwade became Felton Grimwade & Bickford (manufacturers of Bosisto's Eucalyptus Oil), Drug Houses of Australia Ltd and Australian Consolidated Industries Ltd.

His father, Frederick Sheppard Grimwade, died when Andrew was 19. Andrew Grimwade's brother, the Honourable Frederick Sheppard Grimwade, served for many years as President of the Legislative Council of Victoria.

== Business career ==
Grimwade was trained as a chemical engineer (University of Melbourne) and as a scientist (Oxford University). His early business career was in Sydney where he was appointed to the board of Commonwealth Industrial Gases. Aged in his mid-thirties, he was the youngest director of the National Australia Bank, Chief Executive of CARBA and a director of the National Mutual Life Association. He also ran a small merchant banking company that underwrote the flotation of public companies. Since 1959, Grimwade has been Principal of the Green Valley Cattle Company, and in 1996 helped form Certified Australian Angus Beef Ltd, of which he became Deputy chairman and was involved in building it into Australia's leading branded beef program. In the 1990s, Grimwade operated Turoa Ski Field on Mount Ruapehu in New Zealand's Central North Island. Sir Andrew's management was burdened by the 1995 and 1996 Ruapehu eruptions and the unusually poor snow season of 1998. These adverse business conditions ultimately led to a buy out of Turoa by the less-affected Ruapehu Alpine Lifts (RAL), who currently operate Turoa Ski Field.

== Philanthropist ==
In 1968, Grimwade donated 26 km² (2630 hectares) of coastal land with a 27-kilometre ocean frontage on the Coorong in South Australia to the State Government for the new Coorong National Park. This represents about 5.6% of the park's total area, but over 15% of the coastline.

Grimwade was involved as a patron and executive with many charitable organisations, including:

- Chairman of the Felton Bequests Committee, a foundation created in 1904 by his great-grandfather's business partner, Alfred Felton, and primarily dedicated to purchasing art work for the National Gallery of Victoria.
- President (1976–1990), trustee, and life member of the National Gallery of Victoria.
- Trustee of the Victorian Arts Centre.
- Patron of the Miegunyah Press, an imprint of the University of Melbourne Press established by a bequest from Grimwade's great-granduncle Russell Grimwade.
- Honorary Member of the Royal Society of Victoria
- Fellow and Life Member of the Royal Australian Chemical Institute
- Life Member of the Australian Conservation Foundation.
- Founding Chairman of the Australian Arts Exhibition Corporation, which presented The Chinese Exhibition in 1976.

== Public service ==
Grimwade's public service included:

- In 1977 he was appointed a Commander of the Order of the British Empire (CBE) for services to the Arts and the Community
- In 1980 he was created a Knight Bachelor for services to Industry and Commerce
- Member of the Australian Government's first trade mission to China in 1973.
- Founding Member of the Australian Government Remuneration Tribunal
- Inaugural Member of the Council for the Order of Australia (1975–82)
- Victorian Government Board of Review into Parliamentary Salaries (1980)
- Chairman of the Australian Government Committee on Official Establishments (1976–78)
- Founding Chairman of the Australian Government Official Establishments Trust (1979–82).
- Appointed WEHI Laureate (with Nobel Laureate Sir Macfarlane Burnet & Sir Gustav Nossal) (2007)

== Jetcorp trial ==
In 1992, Grimwade was charged with fraud and conspiracy for his involvement in a false prospectus issued for an entity called Jetcorp Australia Unit Trust.

The trial became the longest running criminal trial in Victoria history. After a first jury had sat for seven months, Grimwade's wife died and he was granted a new trial. The second jury sat for over nine months, during which time the judge and some jurors were absent at various times for medical reasons.

The length of the trial was exacerbated by the defence strategy of continually challenging Crown statements, with the result that the Crown was required to strictly prove each and every bit of evidence irrespective of whether it was in dispute or germane to the defence.

This strategy ultimately succeeded. Grimwade was found guilty on nineteen counts of fraud and conspiracy, but the verdict was overturned on appeal, the appellate judge ruling that the case had become so convoluted that it had become impossible for the jury to render a proper verdict.

== Personal life and death ==
Grimwade was also the father of Australian farmer and businessman Angus Grimwade, and grandfather to Lachlan and Cameron Grimwade.

Grimwade died on 30 January 2023, at the age of 92.

== Publications ==
- Grimwade, Andrew, Involvement: The Portraits of Clifton Pugh & Mark Strizic (Melbourne, Sun Books, 1968) ISBN B0000CPM7D
- Grimwade, Andrew, Great Philanthropists on Trial (Melbourne: Miegunyah Press, 2006) ISBN 978-0-522-85263-9
- Grimwade, Andrew, Storied Windows – Casting Light on the Arts, Science & Life in Australia 1959–2011: An Anthology of Speeches, Poems and Reflections (Melbourne: Miegunyah Press, 2012) ISBN 9780522861471.

== Arms ==
Coat of arms of Andrew Grimwade
Crest The top of a tower Azure masoned Or statant thereon a sea-eagle affronté head to the dexter wings outspread Proper on the breast a saltire throughout Azure. Torse Argent and Gules Escutcheon Azure a pale Or and a chevron counterchanged on the pale two and on the chevron as many mullets Azure in the fess point a torch Or enflamed Proper. Motto Summis Adniti Viribus (Having Exerted The Utmost Strength)

== Notes ==
1. Taft, Mark and Parsons, David. Going off the rails, Law Institute of Victoria Law Institute Journal, 68 No 9, September 1994, pages 863-865 (case: R. v. Jon Dean Wilson and Andrew Sheppard Grimwade)
2. Rozenes, M. The new procedures for the prosecution of complex fraud - will they work? (speech), 28th Australian Legal Convention, September 1993, documented at Commonwealth Director of Public Prosecutions site
3. Australian Broadcasting Corporation - Law Matters - Episode 5: Juries - Tuesday, 26 June 2001
4. Hailstone, Robert (Director, Corruption Prevention Division, Criminal Justice Commission) An equation for corruption in the workplace (speech), 1996 Insolvency Practitioners Association of Australia (IPAA) National Conference, Brisbane, 3 May 1996 - PDF file
