= Westerfield (house) =

Heritage-listed house in Melbourne, Victoria, Australia

- Location of the house in Greater Metropolitan Melbourne

General information
- Status: Completed
- Type: House
- Architectural style: Federation Arts and Crafts
- Location: 72–118 Robinsons Road, Frankston South, City of Frankston, Melbourne, Victoria, Australia
- Coordinates: 38°10′38″S 145°09′27″E
- Completed: 1924; 102 years ago
- Client: Sir Russell and Lady Grimwade
- Owner: Joyce and Simon Welsh as of July 2010)

Technical details
- Material: Granite rubble; timber; stucco
- Grounds: 45 ha (110 acres) (1920); 14 ha (35 acres) (c. 2009)

Design and construction
- Architect: Harold Desbrowe-Annear

Victorian Heritage Register
- Official name: Westerfield
- Type: Registered place
- Designated: 6 April 2009
- Reference no.: H2200
- Heritage overlay no.: HO5
- Category: Residential buildings (private)

Register of the National Estate
- Official name: Westerfield
- Type: Defunct register
- Designated: undated
- Reference no.: 18224

Westerfield is a house located at 72–118 Robinsons Road in Frankston South, (Note: Referred to as located in Baxter in one source.) in the City of Frankston, in the south eastern suburbs of Melbourne, in Victoria, Australia.

Built in 1924 on the traditional lands of the Bunurong people, the house was added to the Victorian Heritage Register on 6 April 2009 in recognition of its architectural, historical, and scientific (botanical) significance; and was also added to non-statutory lists by the Victorian branch of the National Trust on 12 December 1990 and the now defunct Register of the National Estate on an unknown date.

== History ==
Westerfield was a 45-hectare (110-acre) property purchased in 1920 by Russell Grimwade CBE – later Sir Russell – and his wife, Mabel CBE, as a farm and rural retreat, in an area which became popular in the 1920s for the holiday houses of Melbourne's most prominent families. Grimwade (1879-1955) was one of Australia's outstanding industrialists, scientists and philanthropists. He was trained in science, was chairman of numerous chemical companies, including the family pharmaceutical business, Felton Grimwade & Co, which later became Drug Houses of Australia, and of the Victorian Board of Scientific and Industrial Research. His interests included arboriculture, carpentry, photography and forestry, and he was an enthusiast for native plants who published an Anthology of Eucalypts in 1920.

At Westerfield he began to plant what became a collection of more than fifty species of gums, as well as acres of lavender and roses, from which oil was distilled. In 1924, fashionable Melbourne architect, Harold Desbrowe-Annear, who had completed alterations to the Grimwade's Toorak house, Meigunyah, in 1921, was engaged by Grimwade to design the Frankston holiday home. Nearby was a terraced lawn, a garden and pergola, probably also designed by Annear, an orchard and vegetable garden, and a timber windmill (now demolished) designed to generate electricity for the house. An area of natural bushland east of the house was retained.

With the onset of World War II Australia's supply of many essential plant-derived drugs was cut off, and Grimwade, with the aid of the Australian government, obtained seed from England and cultivated, at Westerfield, crops of poppies, foxgloves, deadly nightshade, henbane and colchicum. He constructed a drying shed, and with the resources of the family firm's laboratories developed extraction techniques to produce many of the drugs essential for Australia's war effort. The poppy seed grown at Westerfield was distributed to farms around Australia, and was able to satisfy all of Australia's morphine requirements until after the war. Grimwade was knighted in 1950. The property was sold and subdivided after his death.

As of July 2010, the owners of the property were Joyce and Simon Welsh and it was reported that a 2.656-hectare (6.56-acre) remnant bushland portion of the Westerfield estate was to be cleared for the development of the Peninsula Link, part of the Mornington Peninsula Freeway.

=== Other Grimwade family homes ===
Other holiday homes and estate on, or near, the Mornington Peninsula, also listed on the Victorian Heritage Register, owned by members of the Grimwade family include Coolart estate inclusive of a Victorian Second Empire mansion, built by the Hon. Frederick Sheppard Grimwade MLC who owned the estate between 1895 and 1905, subsequently purchased by the Victorian Government and managed by Parks Victoria as a homestead, wetlands, nature reserve, and historic house museum; Marathon, in Mount Eliza, built from 1914 by Major General Harold William Grimwade CB CMG VD and owned by the family, until the family subdivided the 12-hectare (30-acre) estate in the 1950s and sold the Arts and Crafts-style house and gardens in mid-1992; and Grimwade House, in Rye, built in 1962 by Geoffrey Grimwade CMG and owned by the family, that was listed for sale in 2026.

In the Melbourne suburb of Caulfield North, the Hon. F. S. Grimwade built Harleston in 1875 in a Victorian Filigree style, located on the corner of Balaclava and Orrong roads later called Grimwade House and acquired by Melbourne Grammar School in c. 1911 – c. 1918, subsequently used as a preparatory campus.

== Description ==
=== House ===
The Westerfield estate is set on 14 hectares (35 acres) and incorporates a house, garden, paddocks, dam and bushland. The two-storey Federation Arts and Crafts style house has ground floor walls of uncoursed locally-quarried granite rubble and a half timber and stucco upper floor. The plan is unconventional with three wings radiating out from a central stair hall. The house has no corridors, and many rooms have unusual shapes. The interior is remarkably intact, with many original details such as built-in furniture and door furniture. Much use was made of stained timber, for floors, skirtings, architraves, doors and built-in cupboards, but some is now painted white. A small timbered tower containing a water tank rises from the centre of the cement-tiled roof. In the angle between two wings is an east-facing semicircular porch, now glassed in, axially aligned to the main garden path. Above the porch is a balustraded deck, intended as a lookout towards Westernport Bay. To the south of the house are a caretaker's cottage and a garage.

=== Gardens ===
The landscape still reflects the original design, with distinct but integrated features. A driveway lined with Corymbia maculata leads to the house. To the west is Grimwade's eucalypt paddock, with many species of gums remaining, including Corymbia ficifolia, Eucalyptus saligna, E. cladocalyx, and E. sideroxylon. To the east of the house is a long formal garden with a terraced lawn, flower beds, a fuchsia hedge, and a lily pond at the north end. The garden retains many of Grimwade's plantings, including a crab apple (Malus floribunda), Washington thorn, two old Lilacs and a Liquidamber. 'Sunny South' roses, which were once grown commercially on the property have been transplanted to the garden from the paddock where they were grown.

The pergola that once divided the orchard from the garden was replaced by the 1950s by a privet hedge. In the orchard are many fruit trees planted by Grimwade, including three lemons, an old fig, Gravenstein, Democrat, Stewart's Seedling and Smith's Late Red apples, and Packham Triumph, Honeyball and Beurre Bosc pears. West of the eucalypt paddock, at the edge of a paddock where the roses and later the drug crops were grown, is a timber drying shed and next to it the base of a brick furnace used for heating, and nearby is an elevated water tank relocated from the former Langwarrin Military Reserve in c. 1922. To the east is an area of natural bushland retained by Grimwade and cared for by later owners. The bush area contains the large dam constructed by Grimwade in 1926, a pump shed and the irrigation pipe leading from the dam to the upper tank, garden and paddocks.

== See also ==
- Architecture of Melbourne
- List of places on the Victorian Heritage Register in the City of Frankston
