= Frederick Grimwade =

Frederick Grimwade may refer to:

- Frederick Sheppard Grimwade (1840–1910), Australian businessman and MP
- Fred Grimwade (1933–1989), Australian politician
