= The Gums (homestead) =

Historic homestead in Victoria, Australia

- The Gums Homestead

- Location in Southern Grampians Shire, Victoria
- 37°52′57″S 142°25′27″E
- Type: Homestead, associated built facilities and grounds
- Location: Penshurst, Victoria, Australia
- Nearest city: Hamilton

History
- Built: 1875–1876
- Built for: William Ross

Site notes
- Architect: Joseph Reed
- Architectural style: Italianate

The Gums is a historic pastoral property and homestead complex near Penshurst, in the Western District of Victoria, Australia. Established in 1839 by the Burchett brothers, the estate was subsequently owned by several pastoralists before its acquisition by William Ross in 1864. The property contains two surviving nineteenth-century homesteads, including a two-storey Italianate mansion designed by architect Joseph Reed in 1875–1876. The Gums has remained in the ownership of the Ross family and their descendants into the present day.

== History ==
The Gums pastoral run was established in December 1839 by brothers Henry, Charles Gowland and Frederick Burchett, who had arrived in the Port Phillip District from England in August of that year. The property initially comprised approximately 16,000 acres (6,500 ha) along Muston's Creek, east of the present township of Penshurst, and carried around 1,400 cattle. The brothers disagreed over the future use of the land, with Henry favouring sheep grazing while Charles and Frederick preferred cattle. According to the pastoralist and author Rolf Boldrewood, who knew the family, Charles Burchett chose the name "The Gums" in reference to the naming conventions of country estates in Britain.

In 1843, Charles Burchett withdrew from the partnership to establish a business in Melbourne, transferring his interest in the station to his brothers. Henry subsequently moved his livestock to Coree, a pastoral property near Port Fairy, although he retained a financial interest in The Gums. During the mid-1840s, the pastoral lease was recorded under several names, including Rebecca Cheyne and Walter Glass Cheyne. The property remained associated with the Burchett family until 1849, when it was sold to Henry Gottereaux and his business partner James Darling Wilson, who was then living in England.

Gottereaux, a former military officer, undertook improvements to the property, replacing the original slab-hut residence with a more substantial homestead. The new house, believed to have been constructed around the early 1860s, was a single-storey weatherboard building with a verandah and bay windows flanking its central entrance. It stood near Muston's Creek and was accompanied by agricultural outbuildings, workers' cottages and stables. Some earlier bluestone structures dating from the Burchett family's occupation also survived. In 1854, Gottereaux acquired Wilson's remaining interest in the estate, becoming its sole propiertor.

In March 1862, the pastoral lease was recorded in the names of Horace Flower, a Port Fairy merchant, and William Lily Hawkins. Flower's financial position was subsequently affected by the collapse of the firm William Rutledge and Co. during the same year. Parish records from May 1862 also identified H. Eddington with the homestead and its pre-emptive right. The property later passed to John Moffatt, from whom it was purchased by William Ross towards the end of 1864. By this time, The Gums comprised approximately 12,000 acres (4,900 ha), with its boundaries marked by timber and brush fencing.

William Ross was born in the Madras Presidency in 1827 to Scottish parents and migrated to Australia in 1843. Before acquiring The Gums, he had established himself as a pastoralist on the Murray River, where he owned the Meilman station near its junction with the Murrumbidgee River. Following his move to the Western District, Ross married Amelia Barrows, with whom he had 9 children. The family initially occupied the former Gottereaux homestead, but its limited accommodation eventually prompted the construction of a larger residence.

During 1875–1876, Ross commissioned the prominent Melbourne architect Joseph Reed, of the firm Reed and Barnes, to design a new homestead approximately 800 metres from the existing residence. The resulting mansion was a substantial two-storey building of rendered bluestone, designed in a restrained Italianate style. Its symmetrical façade featured a central entrance portico, a classical pediment and verandahs extending around three sides. The interior included a central hall, a divided staircase, spacious reception rooms and bedrooms on the upper floor. Extensive bluestone stables were also constructed nearby. The project reportedly cost more than £6,000.

Ross also undertook extensive landscaping around the new homestead. The gardens were arranged around a formal central axis, with ornamental lawns, pathways and substantial plantings of native and introduced trees, including oaks, elms, cypresses, pines and other conifers. Ross corresponded with the botanist Ferdinand von Mueller, then director of the Melbourne Botanic Gardens, who may have provided trees and other plants for the property.

Beyond the development of his own estate, Ross became an advocate for tree planting and the conservation of native vegetation. He delivered lectures on these subjects at Penshurst and Caramut in 1886 and proposed that the Victorian government's nursery facilities should be permitted to supply trees to farmers and pastoralists. His interest in plantations was also influenced by the vulnerability of the Western District's grasslands to bushfires. The Gums had been affected by the fires in 1871 and 1873, while a further major outbreak in 1899 damaged established plantations across the estate. Ross promoted the establishment of windbreaks and other protective tree plantings.

Ross was also prominent in local government and colonial politics, and joined the Shire of Mount Rouse council in 1866 and served as its president in 1870. In 1878, he was elected to the Victorian Legislative Council as the representative for Western Province, retaining the seat until 1888. He was also active in the Presbyterian Church.

On 22 February 1900, William Ross died at The Gums after being accidentally shot by his son Francis, who was shooting Indian mynahs in the garden. He was 72 years old. The estate subsequently passed to his sons John, Alexander, Stuart and Francis Ross.

Stuart and Francis transferred their interests to their brother Alexander, who retained the principal homestead and approximately 4,500 acres (1,800 ha). John Ross received a separate holding of similar size, which became known as North Gums. The original pastoral estate was therefore divided into smaller properties while remaining under the ownership of the Ross family.

Alexander Ross and his wife had one daughter, Rosemary, born in 1912. Following Alexander's death, the estate was managed at various times by John R. Ross and John Harrison. By November 1941, the earlier homestead was occupied by Mrs A. R. Ross, while the larger 1870s mansion stood vacant and had become partly covered with ivy.

Rosemary Ross married Dr William Agar in England following the Second World War. The couple settled in Melbourne and raised five children before returning to live at The Gums in 1967. It has remained in Ross ownership since and continues to operate as a working farm.

== See also ==
- Merrang
- Chatsworth House
- Devon Park
- Blackwood
