= Tim Olle =

Australian rules footballer

Personal information
- Full name: Timothy Olle
- Born: 30 September 1926; Penshurst, Victoria
- Died: 26 June 1999 (aged 72)
- Original team: Penshurst
- Height: 189 cm (6 ft 2 in)
- Weight: 83 kg (183 lb)

Playing career^{1}
Years	Club	Games (Goals)
1949–1951	St Kilda	6 (0)
1952	Port Melbourne (VFA)	4 (1)
- ^{1} Playing statistics correct to the end of 1952.

Timothy Olle (30 September 1926 – 26 June 1999) was an Australian rules football player for St Kilda in the Victorian Football League (VFL).

== Playing career ==
Olle made his league debut for the Saints in Round 17 of the 1949 VFL season and played the final three rounds of the season. He played two matches the following season before playing his final match in Round 8 of the 1951 season.

In 1952 he requested a transfer to Victorian Football Association (VFA) club Port Melbourne.
