= Devon Park =

Devon Park may refer to:

- Devon Park, South Australia, a suburb of Adelaide
- Devon Park, Queensland in the Toowoomba Region
- Devon Park (Victoria), homestead and estate
- a suburb of Stellenbosch in South Africa
- Devon Park (stadium), a softball-specific ballpark in Oklahoma, United States
