= Billilla =

Building in Melbourne, Australia

- Location of the house in Greater Metropolitan Melbourne
- Alternative names: Billilla Mansion; Billilla Gardens

General information
- Status: Completed
- Type: Mansion (1878–1977); Function and event venue (since 2021– )
- Architectural style: Victorian Italianate; Federation Arts and Craft; Art Nouveau; Jacobethan Revival
- Location: 26 Halifax Street, Brighton, City of Bayside, Melbourne, Victoria, Australia
- Coordinates: 37°55′04″S 145°00′04″E
- Completed: 1878; 148 years ago
- Renovated: 1888; 1907
- Owner: Weatherly family ( –1973)

Technical details
- Material: Bricks; cast iron

Renovating team
- Architects: Smith and Johnson (1888); Walter Richmond Butler (1907)

Site notes
- Owner: City of Bayside (since 1977)

Victorian Heritage Register
- Official name: Billilla
- Type: Registered place
- Delisted: 8 April 1996
- Reference no.: H1155
- Heritage overlay no.: HO188
- Category: Residential buildings (private)

Billilla is a former mansion and now Council-owned function and event venue, located at 26 Halifax Street in Brighton, in the City of Bayside, in the south eastern suburbs of Melbourne, in Victoria, Australia. Built and used as a residence from 1878 until 1973, the property was acquired by the local council in 1974 and has had a variety of subsequent uses, most predominately as a function and event venue.

Built in 1878 on the traditional lands of the Bunurong people, the mansion was added to the Victorian Heritage Register on 8 April 1996 in recognition of its architectural, historical, and social importance; and was also added to a non-statutory list by the Victorian branch of the National Trust on 5 December 1963.

== History ==
In 1878, Robert Wright, a successful miner from the Ballarat goldfields, purchased three hectares (seven and a half acres) from Edwin Brownscombe and built a substantial home of thirteen rooms in the mid-Victorian style.

Wright, impacted by the cost of the construction and the demise of the Melbourne land boom, was forced to mortgage the property, entered into bankruptcy, and the mortgage took possession and leased the house to tenants, one of whom was Henry Butler. In 1884, Butler purchased the house and then immediately sold the property to Scottish-born pastoralist, William Weatherly, who named it as Billilla. (Note: The name, Billilla, is most likely to have been chosen by Weatherly from the Billilla Station, located between Broken Hill and Wilcannia. Weatherly was the managing partner in T. Chirnside & Co., and held a one-sixth share in the Billilla Station pastoral holding of 180,000 hectares (450,000 acres).) Weatherly, who was the managing partner in T. Chirnside & Co., and an early investor in The Broken Hill Proprietary Company Limited, (Note: In 1884, Weatherly bought a one-fourteenth share (for £150) in the newly-established Broken Hill mine from (Sir) Sidney Kidman.) – and a director from 1888 – commissioned Smith and Johnson in 1888 to design renovations to the house, including a six-stall stable building. This work did not appear to affect the appearance of the facade. Some further minor alterations were made in 1900.

In 1907, Weatherly commissioned Walter Richmond Butler to make comprehensive adjustments, which shows a move by Butler to an Federation Arts and Crafts style, evidenced by the extensive use of Art Nouveau and Jacobethan Revival detailing around the perimeter of the Victorian-stlyed house creating three totally new facades, as well as a ring of new rooms behind.

A cyclone across Port Phillip Bay in 1918 damaged parts of the mansion and gardens.

Weatherly's wife, Jean Thomson Weatherly, was a noted local proponent of the Australian Women's National League that quickly grew to become the largest women's political organisation in the country, that successfully campaigned for women's suffrage in Australia. As a wealthy middle-aged woman married to a prominent businessman on the conservative side of politics, Jean Weatherly led the local branch of the League and held society balls and receptions that earned praise for their tasteful glamour. She turned these skills toward organising fundraisers, public meetings, and ‘at homes’ at Billilla.

William Weatherly died on 1 September 1914, survived by a son and two daughters. Following the 1972 death of Violet, one of his daughters, aged 89 years, Billilla was purchased by the former City of Brighton – now City of Bayside – in 1973 and after extensive modifications and restoration, was officially reopened in 1989 as an historic house museum, and was later leased for use as a event venue for weddings and functions, before being leased to Xavier College between c. 2006 and 2021. Thereafter, it was repurposed as a community centre and events and functions venue.

== Description ==
Billilla is a single storeyed, rendered brick mansion dominated by a three-storeyed tower. When built in 1878, the front facade was symmetrical around a projecting rendered portico that was decorated with an Italianate parapet and urns. Flanking this portico there was a delicate cast iron verandah with paired columns and a cast iron frieze. This verandah extended down each side of the house and on the west side the symmetry was broken by a three-storeyed tower. The tower, a most typical element of this style of architecture, was also decorated in the Italianate tradition, with raised quoining to the corners, oculus windows at the second level and a bracketed eaves line surmounted by an Italianate balustrade and urns similar to the portico.

The exterior of Billilla stands apart as his most comprehensive essay in the mixture of Art Nouveau and Jacobethan Revival styles, expressed in rendered ornamentation over a large house, with classical idioms as the main stylistic sources. This represented a prominent departure from the norm of residential architecture at that time. Internally, it is significant for the fine quality and wide stylistic variety of its architectural embellishment, particularly in the plasterwork of the ceilings, and all the associated fittings such as door furniture, light fittings and hearths. Despite various changes in use from the 1970s onwards, the house retained all its known original outbuildings except the conservatory. Billilla is an extraordinary example of the encasing of an earlier building, and is of interest for its associations with prominent Melbourne architects, Smith and Johnson, who undertook the 1888 alterations.

Billilla is an outstanding intact example of Edwardian and Victorian-era fabric, services, and fittings, and is noted for its outbuildings and extensive garden and grounds, all of which constitute an extraordinary example of the lifestyle and working of a wealthy Edwardian household. Billilla is also of interest for its association with Weatherly, a close friend of Andrew Chirnside and family, and an early shareholder in BHP, the source of his considerable fortune.

== See also ==
- Architecture of Melbourne
- List of places on the Victorian Heritage Register in the City of Bayside
