= Grimwade House =

Grimwade House may mean:

- Grimwade House, a preparatory school of Melbourne Grammar School, in Caulfield, Melbourne, Victoria, Australia
- Grimwade House, Rye, a heritage-listed house on the Mornington Peninsula, Melbourne, Victoria, Australia
