= Melbourne University Publishing =

Publishing arm of the University of Melbourne

- Parent company: University of Melbourne
- Founded: 1922; 104 years ago
- Country of origin: Australia
- Headquarters location: Melbourne
- Distribution: Simon & Schuster (Australia); Simon & Schuster (US); Mare Nostrum Group (Europe)
- Publication types: Books
- Imprints: Miegunyah Press, MUP Academic
- Official website: www.mup.com.au

Melbourne University Publishing (MUP) is the book publishing arm of the University of Melbourne. The press is currently a member of the Association of University Presses.

== History ==
MUP was founded in 1922 as Melbourne University Press to sell text books and stationery to students, and soon began publishing books itself. Over the years scholarly works published under the MUP imprint have won numerous awards and prizes. The name Melbourne University Publishing was adopted for the business in 2003 following a restructure by the university, but books continue to be published under the Melbourne University Press imprint. The company's mandate was expressed by the tag line, "Books with Spine", which was coined by the writer Guy Rundle when Louise Adler asked him for a suitable motto. The tag line was later changed to "Australia's first university press".

The Miegunyah Press is an imprint of MUP, established in 1967 under a bequest from businessman and philanthropist Russell Grimwade, with the intention of subsidising the publication of illustrated scholarly works that would otherwise be uneconomic to publish. Grimwade's great-grandnephew Andrew Grimwade was its patron. Miegunyah, was named after the mansion in Orrong Road that Russell Grimwade gifted to his wife Mabel Louise Kelly in 1909 when they married, and is from an Aboriginal Australian word meaning 'my house'.

The literary journal Meanjin was an editorially independent imprint of MUP from 2008 to 2025. In February 2026, Queensland University of Technology (QUT) became the new custodian of Meanjin.

== Directors ==
- 1922–1932: Stanley Addison
- 1932–1942: Frank Wilmot
- 1943–1962: Gwyn James
- 1962–1988: Peter Ryan
- 1989: Brian Wilder
- 1990–1994: John Iremonger
- 1994: Andrew Watson (Acting)
- 1994–1996: Brian Wilder
- 1996–2002: John Meckan
- 2002–2019: Louise Adler
- 2019–2023: Nathan Hollier
- 2024–present: Foong Ling Kong

== See also ==
- List of university presses
