= Walter Butler (architect) =

Australian architect (1864–1949)

Walter Richmond Butler
- Born: 24 March 1864; Somerset, England
- Died: 31 May 1949 (aged 85); Toorak, Melbourne, Australia
- Occupations: Architect; academic

Walter Richmond Butler (24 March 1864 – 31 May 1949), was a British-born Australian architect, trained in the Arts and Crafts style that he adapted for Australia's Federation style.

== Personal life ==
In 1864 Walter Richmond Butler was born on his family's farm in Pensford in Somerset, England. He was the sixth of eight children. Aged 15 years, Butler became the apprentice of developing Arts and Crafts architect Alexander Lauder (1836–1921), who allegedly described Butler as "a truly gifted person".

Butler frequently travelled throughout England and Europe and it was not until 1888 that Butler decided to follow in the footsteps of five of his siblings and emigrate to Australia in search of prosperity and exciting new possibilities. He departed from Plymouth on the SS Oroya on 21 July arriving in Sydney in October, and by the end of the year had moved to Melbourne.

Butler married Emelie Millicent Howard in April 1894, and they had three children: Adna Millicent Howard, Howard Richmond Henry and Winifred Howard. The family lived in Armadale in the eastern suburbs of Melbourne in a large house called Duncraig. Butler's daughter Adna once described him as "a very energetic man… never idle. He was good at all ball games… and was as fond of dancing and playing bridge as he was of mending anything".

At the age of 21, Butler's son Howard died fighting in WWI, and it was after this that Butler appeared to limit his professional involvement in architecture. He did however continue as a practicing architect until he retired in 1939 at the age of 75. He died in 1949 at the age of 84.

== Professional life ==
Having trained with Alexander Lauder in Barnstaple UK, Butler worked for three years in the office of J D Sedding in London where he was accepted into the domestic revival groups centered on William Lethaby, Ernest Gimson and a number of other architects around Richard Norman Shaw and William Morris. In 1885 W. R. Lethaby encouraged Butler to move to London and work with J. D. Sedding, there, he worked for 3 years. In June 1888 Butler left Sedding's firm and set for Australia, where he resided and worked in Melbourne. Three of Butler's brothers and one of his sisters also settled in Australia. From 1889 until 1893 Butler worked in collaboration with Beverely Ussher. In 1896 George C. Inskip joined his practice, however their association ended in 1905 after a disagreement with the Royal Victorian Institute of Architects over the conduct of a competition. In 1907-16 he partnered Ernest R. Bradshaw and after World War I he was in association with his nephew Richard (b. 1892) as W. & R. Butler, which shortly included Marcus Martin. In the late 1930s Butler was in partnership with Hugh Pettit before retiring when Pettit enlisted for World War II.

== Notable projects ==
=== The Missions to Seamen (1916) ===
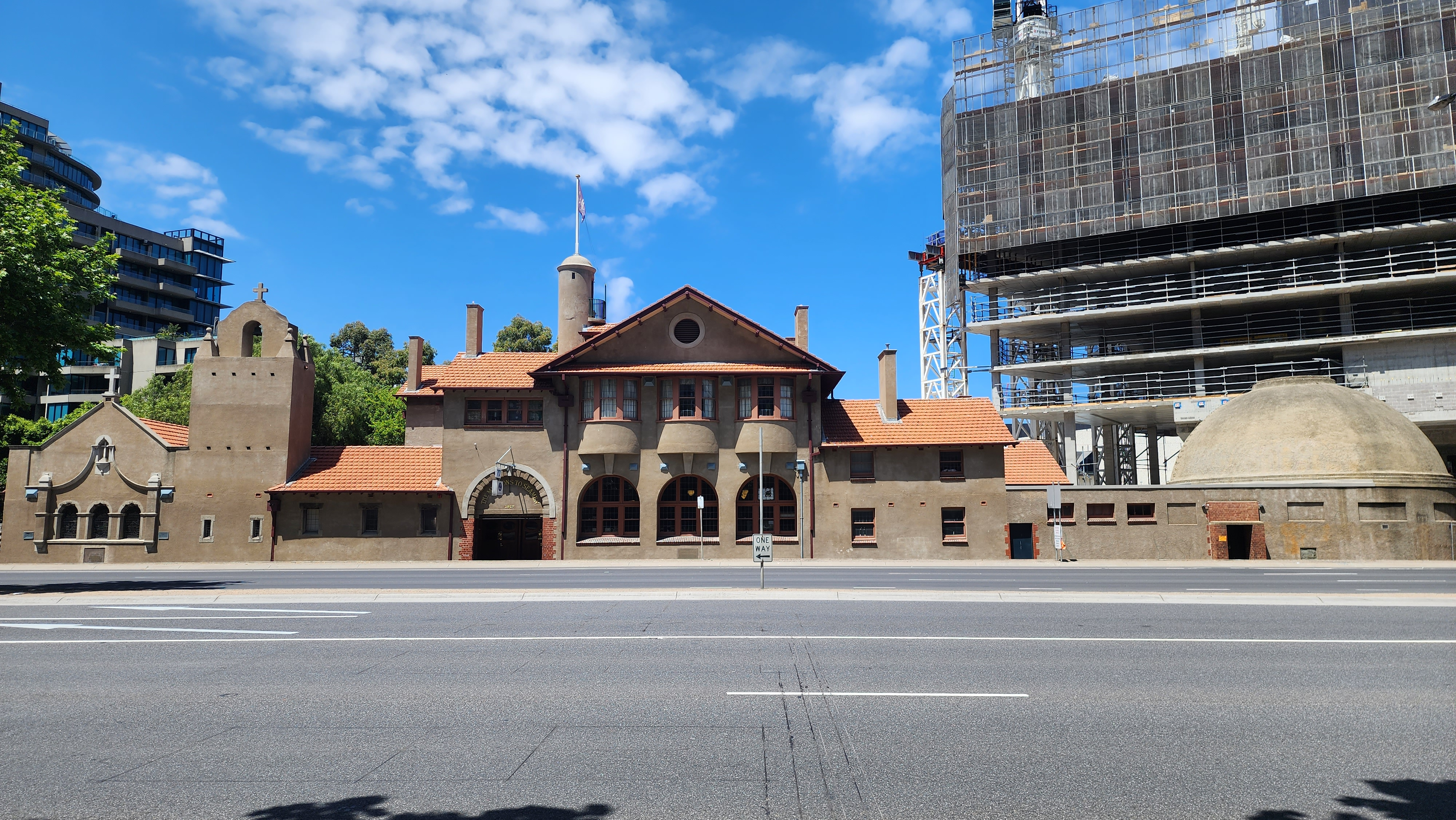
Mission to Seamen, Flinders St, Docklands

Butler designed the Anglican mission building located on 717 Flinders Street, Docklands in 1916. It was designed in a mixture of styles one being in the style of Spanish mission revival, which was prevalent during the 1890s, and his immense experience in the arts and craft architecture. What made The Missions to Seamen building so significant was the introduction of the Spanish Mission style to Melbourne. The revival of this building is evident in its bell tower with its pinnacles, its rough-hewn timber trusses, and the monastic-like courtyard. This style soon after became popular in the Melbourne suburbs. The complex was added to the Victorian Heritage Register in recognition of its architectural, aesthetic, and historical significance.

=== David Syme Tomb (1908) ===
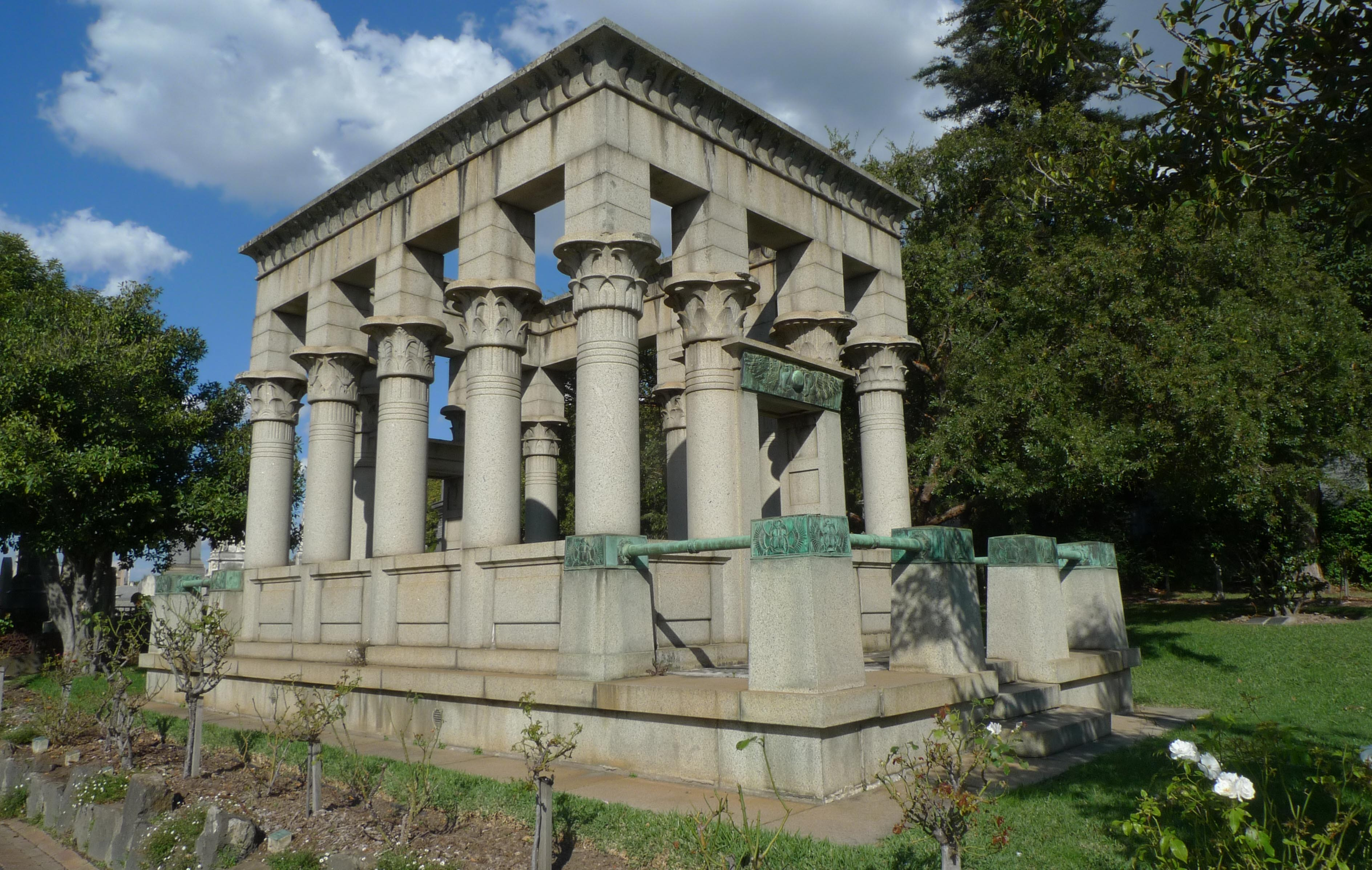
David Syme Tomb, Kew

Butler was selected to carry out the commissioning of this tomb situated in Boroondara Cemetery in Kew. The tomb is based on Trajan's Kiosk on Philae Island in Egypt's south, only smaller and encompassing a similar symbolic context. Butler ensured that the symbolism best represented Symes character merged with his growing interest in iconography architecture. The cemetery, including the tomb, was added to the Victorian Heritage Register in recognition of its aesthetic, architectural, scientific (botanical), and historical significance.

=== Edzell (1917, extension) ===
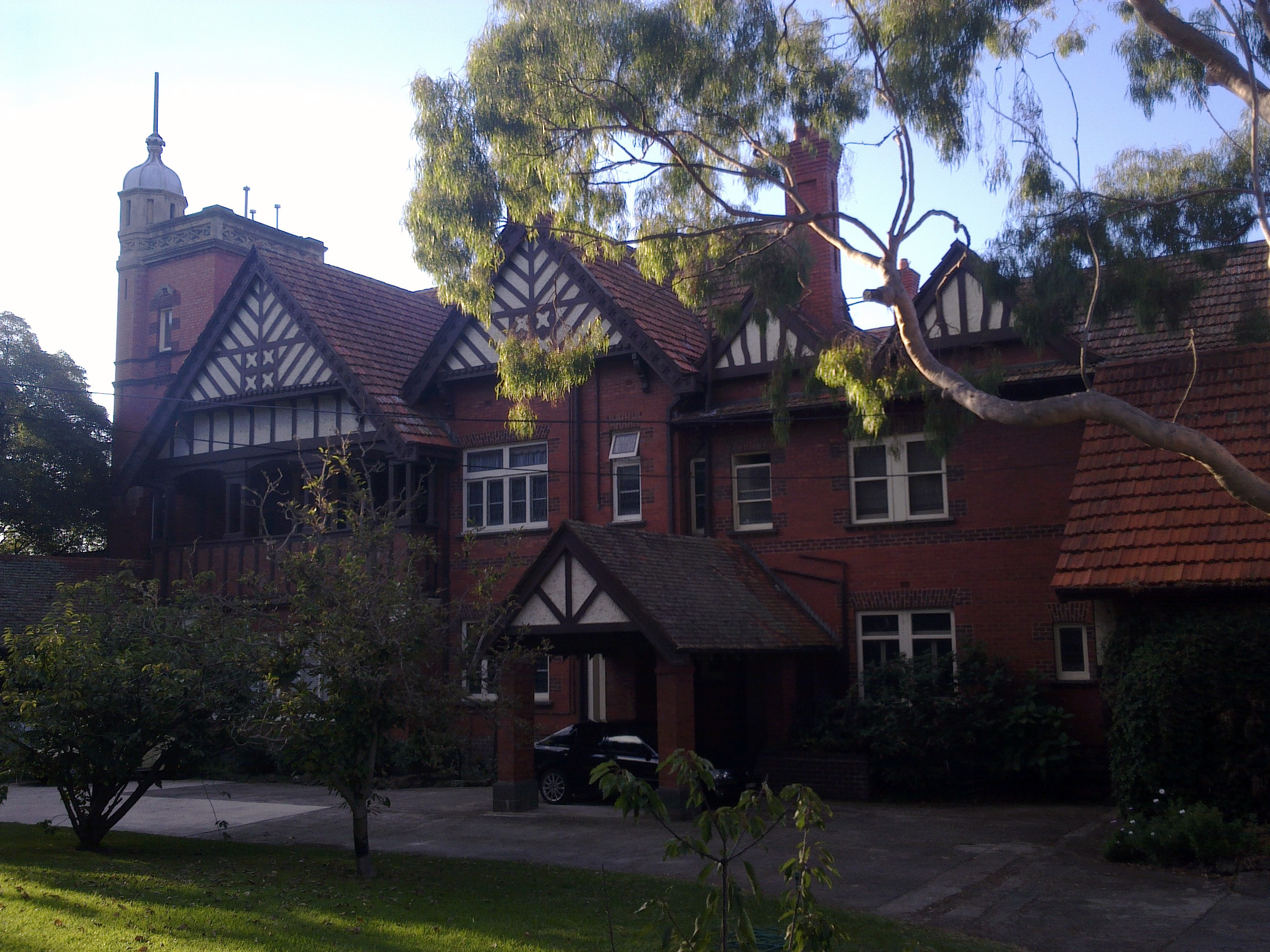
Edzell, Toorak

Located in Toorak along the Southbank of the Yarra River, the Edzell mansion can be said to be one of Tooraks grandest mansions. It was originally designed by the architects Reed Smart and Tappin and in 1917 Butler designed extensions to the mansion including a ballroom and an additional garden to the property. What makes this mansion so significant is the mixture of architectural styles by prominent architects. The house was added to the Victorian Heritage in recognition of its architectural, historical, and aesthetic significance.

=== Other notable projects ===
Other notable project completed in full or part by Butler include:

Houses/mansions

- Blackwood (1891), near Penshurst, for R.B. Richie
- Wangarella (1894), near Deniliquin, for Thomas Milear
- Newminster Park (1901), near Camperdown, for Andrew Chirnside
- Warrawee (1906), Camberwell, for A. Rutter Clark
- Billilla (1907, substantial alterations), in Brighton, for William Weatherly, listed on the Victorian Heritage Register
- Kamillaroi (1907), Toorak, for Clive Baillieu
- Thanes (1908), Kooyong, for Franz Wallach, listed on the Victorian Heritage Register
- Marathon (1914, 1924), in Mount Eliza, for Major General Harold William Grimwade CB CMG VD and family, listed on the Victorian Heritage Register
- Coombe Cottage (1926, gates and gatehouse), Coldstream, for Dame Nellie Melba, listed on the Victorian Heritage Register

Religious buildings

- St Albans Church (1899), Armadale
- Church of the Holy Annunciation (1901), East Melbourne, listed on the Victorian Heritage Register
- Bishopscourt (extensions) (1902), East Melbourne, listed on the Victorian Heritage Register
- Holy Trinity Cathedral (1907), Wangaratta, listed on the Victorian Heritage Register
- Holy Trinity Church (1907, belfry and front porch), Benalla, listed on the Victorian Heritage Register

Office buildings

- Collins House (1910), 360 Collins Street, Melbourne, demolished in 1974
- Queensland Building (1913), on William Street, Melbourne, for the Queensland Insurance Company, listed on the Victorian Heritage Register
