= Blackwood Homestead =

Historic homestead in Victoria, Australia

Blackwood
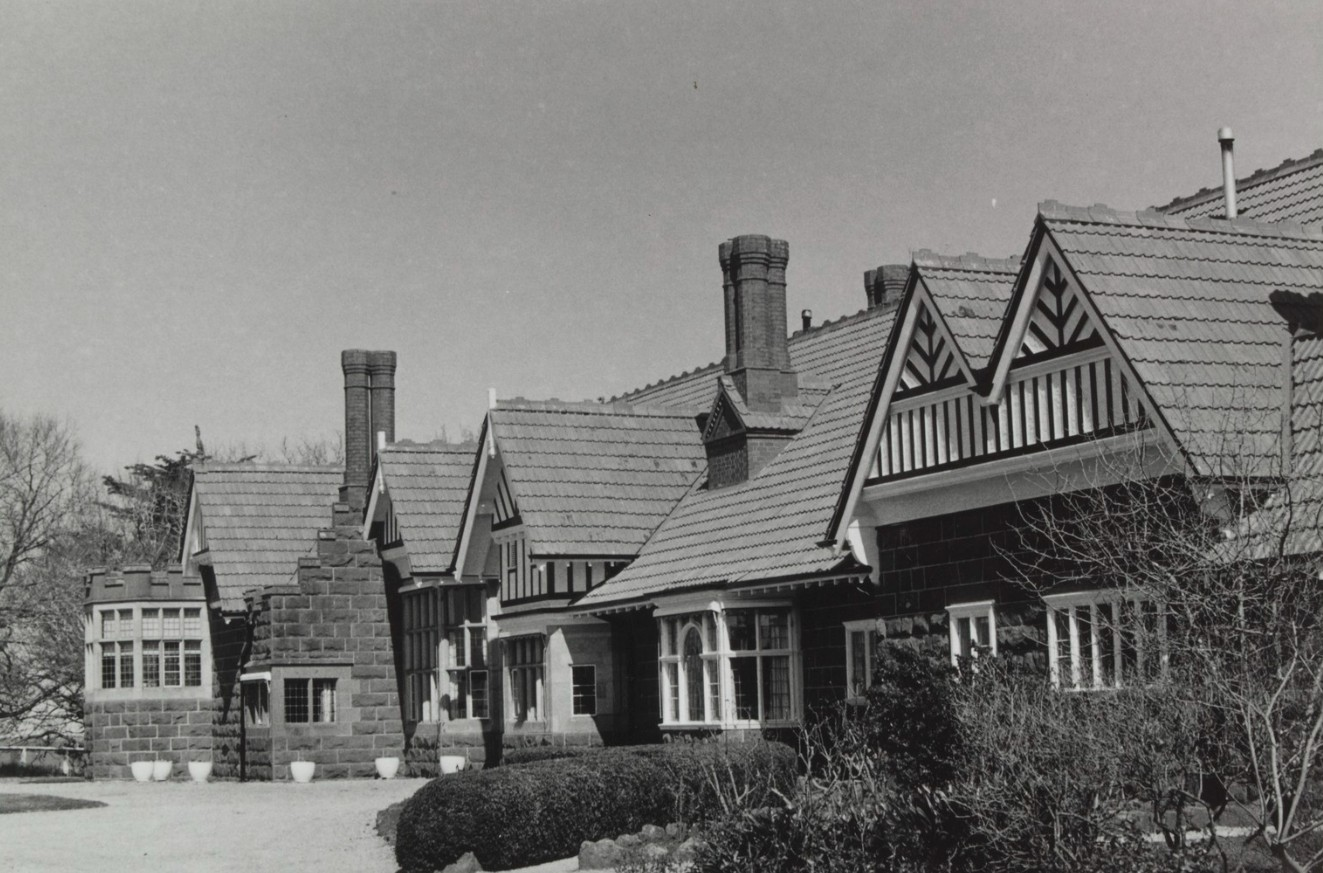
- Blackwood Homestead

- Location in Southern Grampians Shire, Victoria
- 37°48′58″S 142°20′17″E
- Type: Homestead, associated built facilities and grounds
- Location: Penshurst, Victoria, Australia
- Nearest city: Warrnambool

History
- Built: 1893 (present house)
- Built for: Robert Blackwood Ritchie

Site notes
- Architect(s): Beverley Ussher & Walter Butler
- Architectural style: Picturesque

Blackwood is a heritage-listed pastoral homestead near Penshurst, Victoria, Australia. Established as part of the Blackwood pastoral run in the early 1840s, the property has been closely associated with the Ritchie family for much of its history. The present bluestone residence was constructed between 1891 and 1893 in the Picturesque style from designs by architects Butler and Ussher, replacing earlier homesteads built on the property. The complex includes the homestead, stables, gardens and a private cemetery containing the grave of the station's first owner, James Ritchie.

== History ==
The Blackwood pastoral run was first taken up in 1842 by Scottish pastoralist James Ritchie and his partner James Scales (Sceales) under a pre-emptive right of approximately 10,000 acres (4,050 ha). By October 1845 Ritchie had bought out Scales and assumed sole ownership of Blackwood. During these early years the run was developed from the larger Deep Creek station and supported several thousand sheep.

An early two-room bluestone cottage, believed to have been constructed between 1843 and 1858, served as the first homestead on the property. The building later became the Penshurst North School.

James Ritchie died in February 1857 after his horse bolted when a bridle broke, throwing him against a tree. He was buried in a private cemetery at Blackwood, where his obelisk remains the only marked grave despite a number of other burials having taken place there. As he was unmarried, ownership passed to his brothers Daniel and Simon Ritchie, who assumed control of Blackwood and the neighbouring Woodhouse run in 1858.

Daniel Ritchie had previously served as a surgeon in the Royal Navy before emigrating to Australia with his wife, Janet Roy. During the late 1850s and early 1860s the brothers expanded the Blackwood estate through the acquisition of adjoining land. At its greatest extent the combined holdings covered about 35,000 acres (14,165 ha) and supported approximately 33,000 sheep. Following the dissolution of their partnership in 1860, Daniel became sole owner of Blackwood while Simon retained Woodhouse. By 1865 Blackwood itself comprised around 16,000 acres of fenced freehold country carrying about 25,000 sheep.

Daniel Ritchie played a prominent role in the development of the Penshurst district. He was appointed a Justice of the Peace in 1860, chaired the Mount Rose Roads Board and later became the first president of the newly created Shire of Mount Rouse following local government reforms in 1863. Together with his wife Janet, he also supported local education and religious institutions, lobbying for the establishment of Penshurst's first National School and assisting with construction of the local church.

As Blackwood prospered, the original cottage became inadequate for a growing family. In 1864 Daniel designed and commenced construction of a substantial bluestone villa intended as the new family residence. Before it was completed, however, Daniel and his family travelled to Scotland, where he died unexpectedly in 1865. Janet and the children remained in Scotland, and the unfinished house was never occupied as the family home, instead being adapted as shearers' quarters. Management of the estate subsequently passed to executors and to Daniel's cousin John Ritchie, who introduced improvements including tree planting, vineyards and improved pasture grasses.

Following John Ritchie's dead in 1883, ownership eventually passed to Robert Blackwood Ritchie (R. B. Ritchie), the second son of Daniel and Janet, who returned from Scotland to take control of the property in the mid-1880s. Seeking a residence more suited to the importance of the estate, he commissioned Melbourne architects Butler and Ussher to design a new homestead and associated stables. Tenders were called during 1891 and 1892, with contractor Charles Hosking awarded contracts valued at approximately £4,790 for the house and £1,202 for the stables. Construction took about 18 months and was completed in 1893. The bluestone house was built in the Picturesque aesthetic style using locally quarried stone and imported terracotta roof tiles from Bridgwater in England. It incorporated extensive timber panelling, ornate cornices, six bedrooms, a grand hall, drawing room, dining room, morning room and billiards room. The surrounding gardens were laid out at about the same time, with broad lawns overlooing the Western District plains and the Grampians. The homestead has since been recognised as one of the finest nineteenth-century domestic examples of the Picturesque style in Victoria.

In 1893 R. B. Ritchie married Lillian Mary Ross, daughter of neighouring pastoralist William Ross of The Gums. They had two sons, Robert Blackwood Ritchie II ("Robin"), born in 1894, and Alan Blackwood Ritchie, born in 1895. Lillian died at Blackwood in 1897, after which R. B. took the boys to Scotland to be raised by their grandmother Janet before returning to Victoria. While Charles Coldham managed Blackwood, R. B. pursued a political career and served in the Victorian Parliament during the early twentieth century.

The death of Robin Ritchie during the Battle of the Somme in 1916 profoundly affected the family. That year, R. B. sold the homestead together with approximately 3,800 acres (1,540 ha) to James Robertson of Skene. Following the end of the First World War, R. B. and his surviving son Alan jointly acquired the remaining Blackwood lands before selling them several years later. Robertson renamed the homestead "Coolabah", but personal tragedy continued when his wife Naomi drowned in 1922 and Robertson himself died the following year. The property subsequently passed to farmer Paul Miller in 1924.

After graduating from the University of Cambridge, Alan Blackwood Ritchie returned to Australia and in 1927 repurchased the homestead together with the 3,800-acre portion that had been sold in 1916, reuniting Blackwood as a holding of approximately 17,500 acres (7,080 ha). Over subsequent decades he became recognised for innovative farming practices, introducing improved pasture species, new stock breeds, electric fencing, shelter planting and experimental agricultural methods. His work led to his appointment to the Executive of the CSIRO, on which he served from 1950 to 1956. Alan married Canadian-born Margaret Witcomb, and they had four children: Robin, Judith, Blyth and Linton.

During the early 1950s the Soldier Settlement Commission resumed approximately 10,000 acres (4,047 ha) of Blackwood, purchasing the land for £16 per acre. A further 1,500 acre (607 ha) were sold during the mid-1970s, reducing the estate to around 6,000 acres (2,430 ha). Alan and Margaret Ritchie left Blackwood after their eldest son Robin married in 1965, with later generations of the family continuing to operate the property. Robin and his wife Eda left Blackwood in 2001, after which their son Jason Ritchie managed the farm. Between 1999 and 2004 he progressively converted much of the property from grazing to broadacre cropping, establishing around 2,000 hectares of wheat, barley and canola.

In March 2014, Blackwood was purchased by Rifa Salutary Pastoral Company, the Australian subsidiary of the Chinese company Rifa Group, following negotiations led by chief executive David Goodfellow. After acquiring the property, Rifa invested heavily in restoring its pastoral infrastructure, including new fencing, water systems, sheep and cattle yards, renovation of the shearing shed and improvements to farm buildings. The company also returned Blackwood from cropping to a predominantly livestock operation. The homestead has since been occupied by Rifa's operations manager, Wayne Johnstone, and his family.

== See also ==
- Devon Park
- The Gums
