= Westerfeld =

Westerfeld is a surname of Germanic origin. Notable people with the surname include:

- Bill Westerfeld (1927–2017), American racing driver
- Scott Westerfeld (born 1963), American science fiction author
- Stephanie Westerfeld (1943–1961), American figure skater

== See also ==
- Westerveld
