= Strides Pharma Science =

Indian pharmaceutical company

- Type: Public
- Traded as: NSE: STRIDES; BSE: 532531
- Industry: Pharmaceutical
- Founded: 1990
- Headquarters: Bannerghatta Road, Bangalore, India
- Key people: Arun Kumar (Founder and Chairman)
- Products: Hard gelatin, solid dosage, Tablets, Formulations
- Revenue: ▲$566 million (2014)
- Website: www.strides.com

Strides Pharma Science Limited is an Indian pharmaceutical company, headquartered at Bangalore. The company manufactures pharmaceutical products, over-the-counter drugs and nutraceuticals. Products include softgel capsules, hard-gel capsules, tablets and dry and wet injectables. The company has 15 manufacturing sites in six countries and marketing presence in 50 countries. The company partners with generic companies to supply retail and hospital generics in injectable products and softgels. The company's stock trades on the Bombay Stock Exchange and on the National Stock Exchange of India.

Strides Arcolab changed name to Strides Shasun Ltd after an amalgamation of Shasun Pharmaceuticals with Strides Arcolab. In September 2014, the Board of Directors of both the companies had approved a scheme of amalgamation between the two companies.

Arun Kumar is the founder and chairman, and has been on the board as managing director since its inception.

== Manufacturing ==
=== Indian plants ===
In India the company operates eight pharmaceutical plants:

- KRSG Anekal - The company has a manufacturing plant at Jigani in the taluka of Anekal in the southern part of the Bangalore metropolitan area. The plant makes soft gelatin capsules, hard gelatin capsules, tablets and ointments.
- STAR - Strides Technology & Research - the R&D centre at Bannerghata Road (opp. IIM-B, Bangalore)

On 5 December 2013, the company announced that it had completed the sale of its Agila Specialties Division to Mylan Inc., for a total sum of up to US$1.75 billion.

=== Non-Indian plants ===
- Europe - Italy (Beltapharm S.pA)

== Global Disease Initiative ==
Strides operates in the international market for generics to fight HIV/ AIDS, TB and malaria. The company works with the Clinton Foundation to supply lower cost anti-retroviral drugs for the treatment of HIV/AIDS as part of the Clinton Foundation's HIV/AIDS initiative. The company is also on the list of World Health Organization pre-qualified suppliers to supply generic fixed dose combination of anti-HIV drugs. It is an approved supplier to the World Bank, the African Development Bank, PEPFAR President's Emergency Plan For AIDS Relief and UNICEF.
