= Westerveld (surname) =

Westerveld is a Dutch surname. Notable people with the surname include:

- Bill Westerveld, New Zealand footballer
- Jay Westerveld (born 1962), American environmentalist
- Sander Westerveld (born 1974), Dutch footballer
- Sem Westerveld (born 2002), Spanish footballer
