= Penshurst, Victoria =

Penshurst
- Town
- View of Penshurst Hotel, with Mount Rouse in the distance

- Coordinates: 37°53′S 142°17′E
- Country: Australia
- State: Victoria
- LGA: Shire of Southern Grampians
- Location: 279 km (173 mi) W of Melbourne; 31 km (19 mi) SE of Hamilton; 42 km (26 mi) NW of Hexham

Government
  - State electorate: Lowan
  - Federal division: Wannon

Population
  - Total: 461 (2006 census)
- Postcode: 3289

Penshurst is a town in Victoria, Australia. It is in the Shire of Southern Grampians local government area and is located at the foot of Mount Rouse, an extinct volcano. At the 2006 census, Penshurst had a population of 461. Basic facilities include a hospital with an aged care residency and doctor's surgery, a pub, a hall and two schools – one a State school, the other a Catholic school – the State school has 10 students(2020), the Catholic school 26.

== History ==
=== Kolorer gunditj people ===
Before British colonisation, the area around Mount Rouse was the country of the Kolorer gunditj clan of Aboriginal people. Their title is derived from their name for Mount Rouse which was Kolor. The permanent spring that is now located within the Penshurst Botanic Gardens was a traditional meeting place for the Aboriginal people in the region.

=== Arrival of the British ===
Major Thomas Mitchell travelled through the area in 1836, naming Mount Rouse. In late 1839 John Cox, who was a grandson of New South Wales Corps officer William Cox, arrived in the region and established a sheep station which he called Mount Rouse station. Conflict with the Aboriginal population soon followed and in May 1840 a manager at the property named Patrick Codd who had a significant history of violence against Aboriginal people, was killed. Revenge killings by the colonists resulted in up to twenty Aboriginal people being shot. A local Indigenous man named Figara Alkapurata (or Roger) was later arrested for Codd's murder and executed in Melbourne.

=== Mount Rouse Aboriginal Protectorate ===
In early 1842, the colonial government decided to create a reserve for Aboriginal people at Mount Rouse. John Cox was ordered off the land, moving to the neighbouring Weerangourt property. In February 1842, around 210 Aboriginal people from various tribal groups in the region arrived at Mount Rouse accompanied by Assistant Protector Charles Sievwright. The main buildings of the Protectorate were located at what is now the corner of Cox and Martin streets in Penshurst. In his role Sievwright attempted to safeguard the Aboriginal people assigned to him by reporting the massacres conducted by nearby settlers and by providing rations and shelter. However, these actions infuriated the local colonists who demanded the government replace him, and in September 1842 Dr John Watton was appointed to manage the protectorate.

During this time, the Native Police were forcibly rounding up Aboriginal people throughout the Western District and ordering them to go to Mount Rouse or be shot. The reserve however was consistently underfunded and could not provide for the needs of hundreds of people. Therefore, few Aboriginal people remained for any great length of time at Mount Rouse. The reserve was also blamed for providing shelter to Aboriginal people who took livestock and speared shepherds at the surrounding sheep stations. These issues chronically interfered with the operation of the protectorate, and in 1849 Dr Watton resigned from his position. A year later the Aboriginal Protectorate was officially closed down and divided up into two grazing properties with a reserve for a township which became the settlement of Penshurst.

=== Township of Penshurst ===
The town of Penshurst was gazetted in the 1850s, the Post Office opening on 1 September 1857. In 1852 German Lutherans led by Johann Friedrich Krummnow founded a community named Herrnhut located near Mount Rouse about 8 km from Penshurst – the group adhered to the principles of shared property and fervent prayer. Krummnow died there in 1880 and the community had disbanded by 1890.

The Penshurst Memorial Hall located in Martin Street in the centre of the township began as the local Mechanic's Institute in 1871. By 1926, when the Penshurst Mechanics Institute had added a cinema room to the Billiard Room and Library, the Institute had 130 members.

The Penshurst Magistrates' Court closed on 1 November 1981, not having been visited by a Magistrate since 1971.

The Penshurst Volcanoes Discovery Centre is an interpretive centre and tourist information centre located in Martin Street in the old Shire of Mount Rouse offices. It contains an audio/visual display of volcanoes in general, and the eruptions and lava flows of the district in particular.

== Geography ==
Penshurst is located in an area littered with basalt stones up 2m long from the Mount Rouse volcano. These are known locally as the stony rises, the technical name being "breached barriers", having been formed from collapsed lava tubes. Features similar to the stony rises may be observed in other areas of south-west Victoria where there is a history of volcanic activity.

Mount Rouse rises 100m above the surrounding plain (367m above sea level) and is composed of both basaltic lava and scoria. It has several craters, the lower of which is a crater lake. The north east side of Mount Rouse is used as a quarry and crushed for road making scoria.

There were instances in the 1970s where bushfires triggered peat fires beneath the stony rises which burnt for a number on months. A fire watch building is located at the top of Mount Rouse.

Penshurst is serviced by a fresh water spring located in the town.

== Sport ==
The town has an Australian Rules football team named the Penshurst Bombers, competing in the Mininera & District Football League.

Penshurst has a horse racing club, the Penshurst & District Racing Club, which schedules one race meeting a year, the Penshurst Cup meeting on Boxing Day (26 December). The racecourse is located about 1 km north of Bell Street (the Main Street).

Golfers used to play at the course of the Penshurst Golf Club on Racecourse Road. The club disbanded in 2002, just two years short of its centenary. The golf course no longer exists.

== See also ==
- Blackwood Homestead
- The Gums (homestead)
