= Drug Houses of Australia =

- Type: Public company (1936–1970); Subsidiary (since 2006)
- Industry: Pharmaceutical manufacture
- Predecessors: Felton Grimwade & Co; A. M. Bickford & Sons; anor
- Founded: 1936; 90 years ago in Australia
- Founders: Norton Grimwade; Russell Grimwade; Harold Grimwade; anor
- Fate: Takeover; subsequent trade sale
- Successor: Slater Walker (1970)
- Parent: Strides Arcolab (since 2006)

Drug Houses of Australia was an Australian public company established in 1936 as an amalgamation of seven Australian pharmaceutical companies, including Felton Grimwade & Co and A. M. Bickford & Sons. In 1970, DHA was taken over by the British bank Slater Walker.

In September 2006, the Australian company was sold to Strides Arcolab through a share purchase agreement with Haw Par Healthcare Limited, Singapore, for approximately SGD$19.7 million. Drug Houses of Australia (Asia) Pte Ltd is now a leading manufacturer of generic pharmaceutics and Chinese proprietary medicine (CPM) based in Jurong, Singapore; and is a subsidiary of Strides Arcolab that is listed on both the Bombay and National stock exchanges in India.
