= Devon Park (Victoria) =

Historic homestead in Victoria, Australia

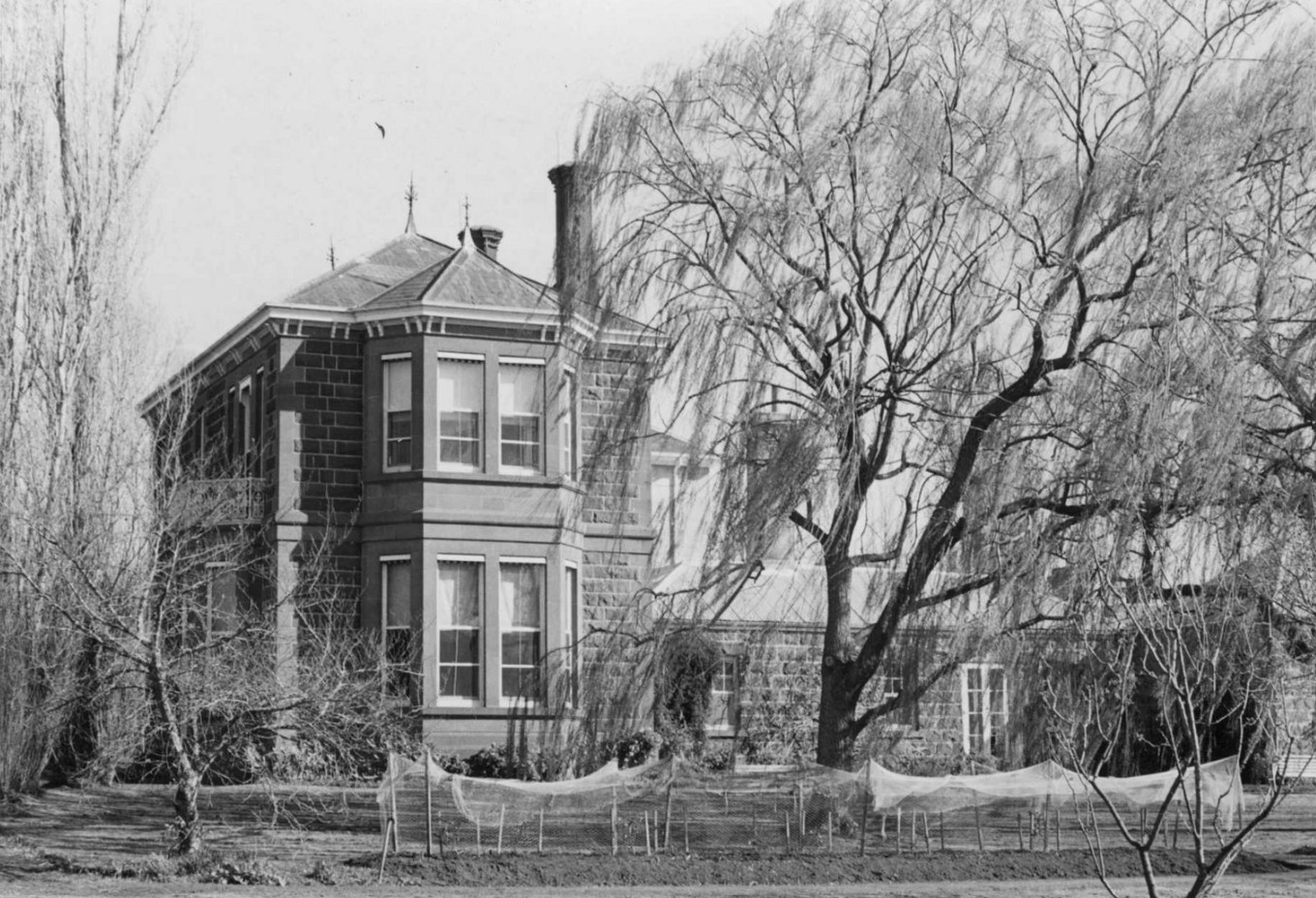
- Devon Park Homestead

- Location in Southern Grampians Shire, Victoria
- 37°44′51″S 142°20′47″E
- Type: Homestead, associated built facilities and grounds
- Location: Dunkleld, Victoria, Australia
- Nearest city: Ararat

History
- Built: 1883 (present homestead)

Site notes
- Architectural style: Italianate

Devon Park is a heritage-listed pastoral homestead and estate located near Dunkeld, Victoria, Australia. Originally established as part of the Linithgow Plains pastoral run in the 1840s, the property was renamed Devon Park after its acquisition by English-born pastoralist and businessman Silas Harding in 1853. The estate has a long association with Western District pastoral history, having operated as a large sheep station before subdivision in the twentieth century. The present homestead complex includes an early bluestone cottage, a substantial 1883-built Italianate-style residence, outbuildings, gardens and remnants of former pastoral infrastructure. The property remains associated with the Clarke family, who acquired the homestead and surrounding land in 1928.

== History ==
The property now known as Devon Park originated as the Linithgow Plains squatting run, first taken up in the early 1840s by Scottish settlers Donald Kennedy and Duncan Cameron Kennedy. The run was formally recorded as Pre-emptive Right No. 156 and covered approximately 44,256 acres (17,910 ha), with an estimated carrying capacity of 2,200 cattle and 16,000 sheep by 1848.

Donald and Duncan Kennedy operated Linithgow Plains until 1853, when the pastoral licence was transferred to Silas Harding, a businessman and pastoralist from Devonshire, England. Harding had arrived in the Port Phillip District in 1841 abord the Sir Charles Forbes and, together with his brother Elias, established pastoral interests in Victoria. He later became a successful ironmonger in Geelong and acquired properties across Victoria and other Australian colonies. Harding was also involved in local business institutions, serving as a director of the Geelong and Western District Fire Insurance Company and as a local director of the Bank of Victoria.

After acquiring Linithgow Plains, Harding renamed the property Devon Park, after his English county of origin. He retained ownership of the station for the remainder of his life. Harding married Mary Louise Howell in 1845 at the Wesleyan Methodist chapel in Geelong. She died in 1882, and Harding remarried Elizabeth Oldham, daughter of Marcus William Oldham and Jane Oldham, in 1890. Elizabeth was the sister of pastoralist and philanthropist Marcus Oldham, whose estate later provided for the establishment of Marcus Oldham College in 1961.

During Harding's ownership Devon Park remained a substantial pastoral holding. In 1862 Harding petitioned the Board of Land and Works for a reduction in rent after approximately 21,000 acres had been taken by selectors, claiming that the resumed land contained valuable infrastructure including dams and huts. Despite these reductions, Harding subsequently expanded his holdings again, controlling approximately 30,767 acres in 1865 and 32,421 acres by 1888. In 1888 the Western District Sheepfarmers Association recorded that 41,000 sheep were to be shorn at Devon Park, with the property occupied by Howell and Tangye, likely managers or relatives of Harding. By 1912 the station was recorded as being managed by White and Oldham, with the holding comprising approximately 41,400 acres.

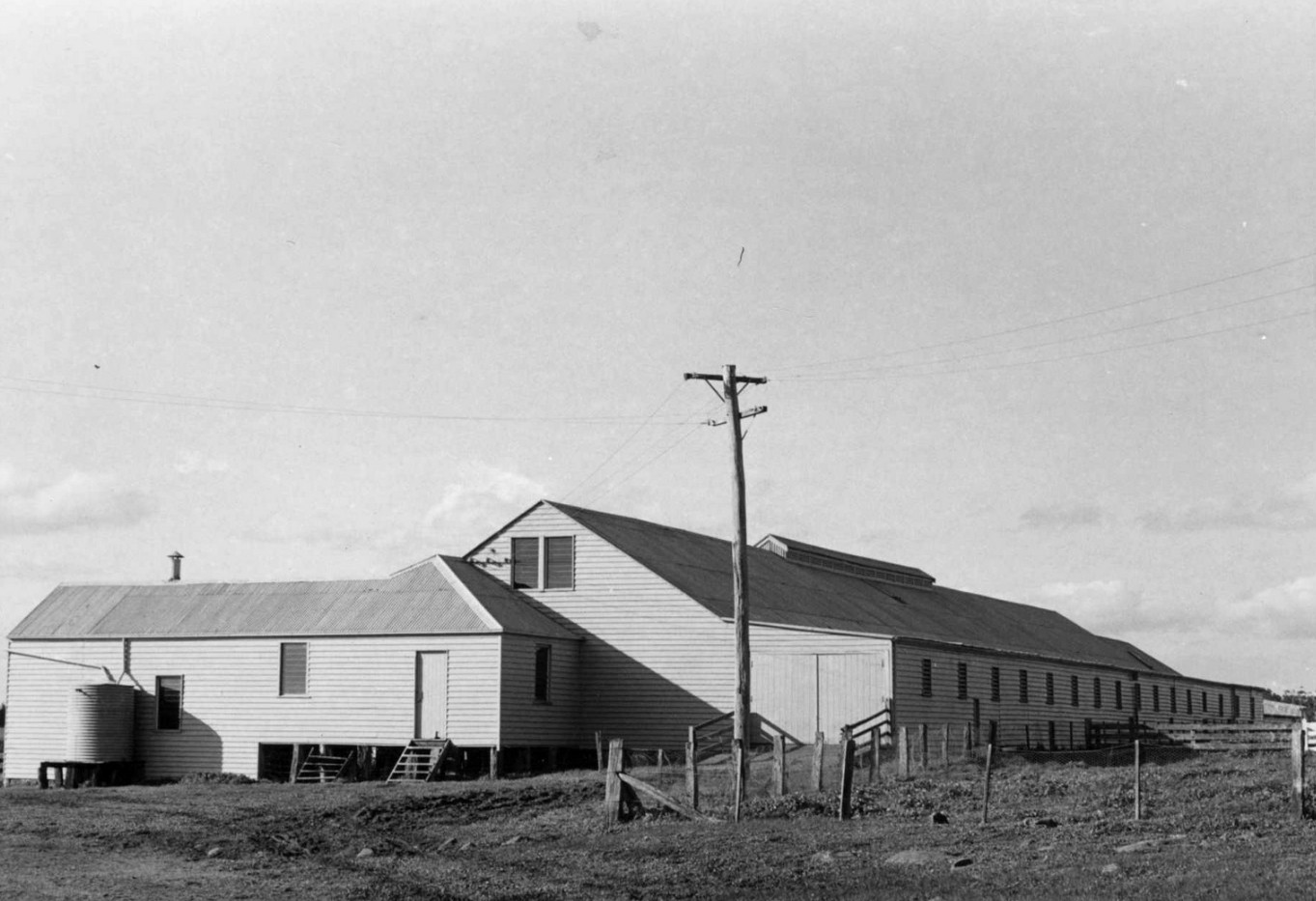
The woolshed

The earliest part of the present homestead is a six-room bluestone cottage, believed to have been constructed during the Kennedy occupation of the property in the 1840s. Further additions, including the western wing of the house, the single men's quarters and stables, appear to date from the 1850s during Harding's ownership. These buildings may have been influenced by the work of Geelong architects Backhouse and Reynolds, who designed Harding's private residence, Edgecumbe, in Newtown, Geelong, in 1859.

The original homestead complex was expanded substantially during the late nineteenth century. Between 1882 and 1883 Harding commissioned the construction of a large two-storey bluestone addition, employing Geelong builders and masons William McRorie (or McRory) and Sons. The addition transformed the residence into a substantial Italianate-style mansion, reflecting late Victorian architectural traditions in England and contemporary domestic architecture in Victoria. Unlike many large pastoral homesteads of the period, Devon Park's residence was designed without a front verandah. Its principal interior features include extensive timber detailing, a grand hexagonal dining room and 17-foot ceilings.

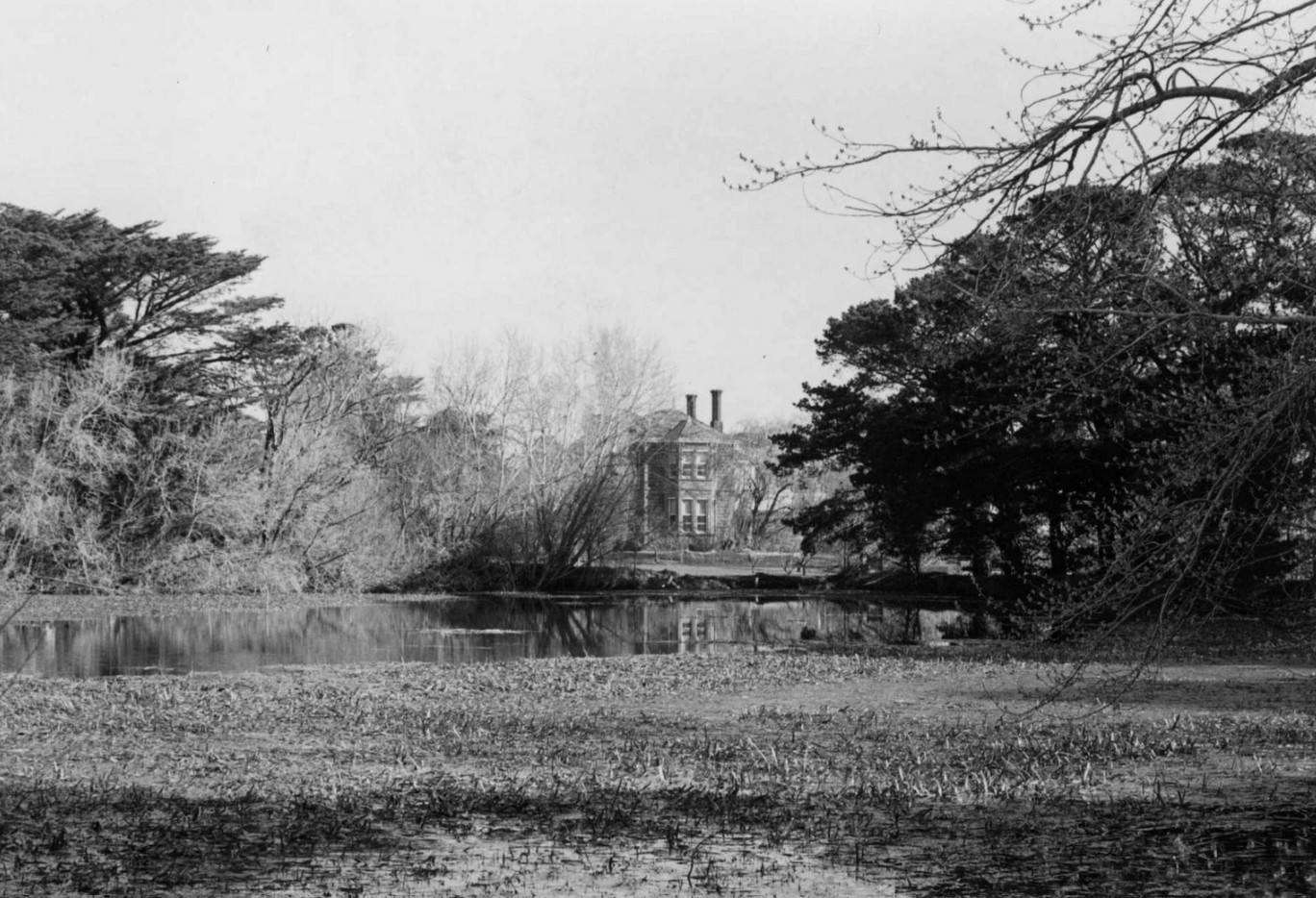
The homestead, viewed from the lake

The surrounding garden was developed over the nineteenth and twentieth centuries and covers approximately three acres. It includes sweeping lawns and mature ornamental plantings, including golden ash, poplars,Bunya pines, Atlas cedar, hoop pine, copper beech, tricolour beech, oak, sycamore and Illawarra flame trees.

Following Silas Harding's death in 1894, Devon Park passed into the Oldham family through his widow Elizabeth. Elizabeth died in a buggy accident in 1897, after which her estate passed to her brother Marcus Oldham and sister Anna. Anna Oldham married Devon Park manager James White in 1898, and White continued to manage the property until his death in 1923.

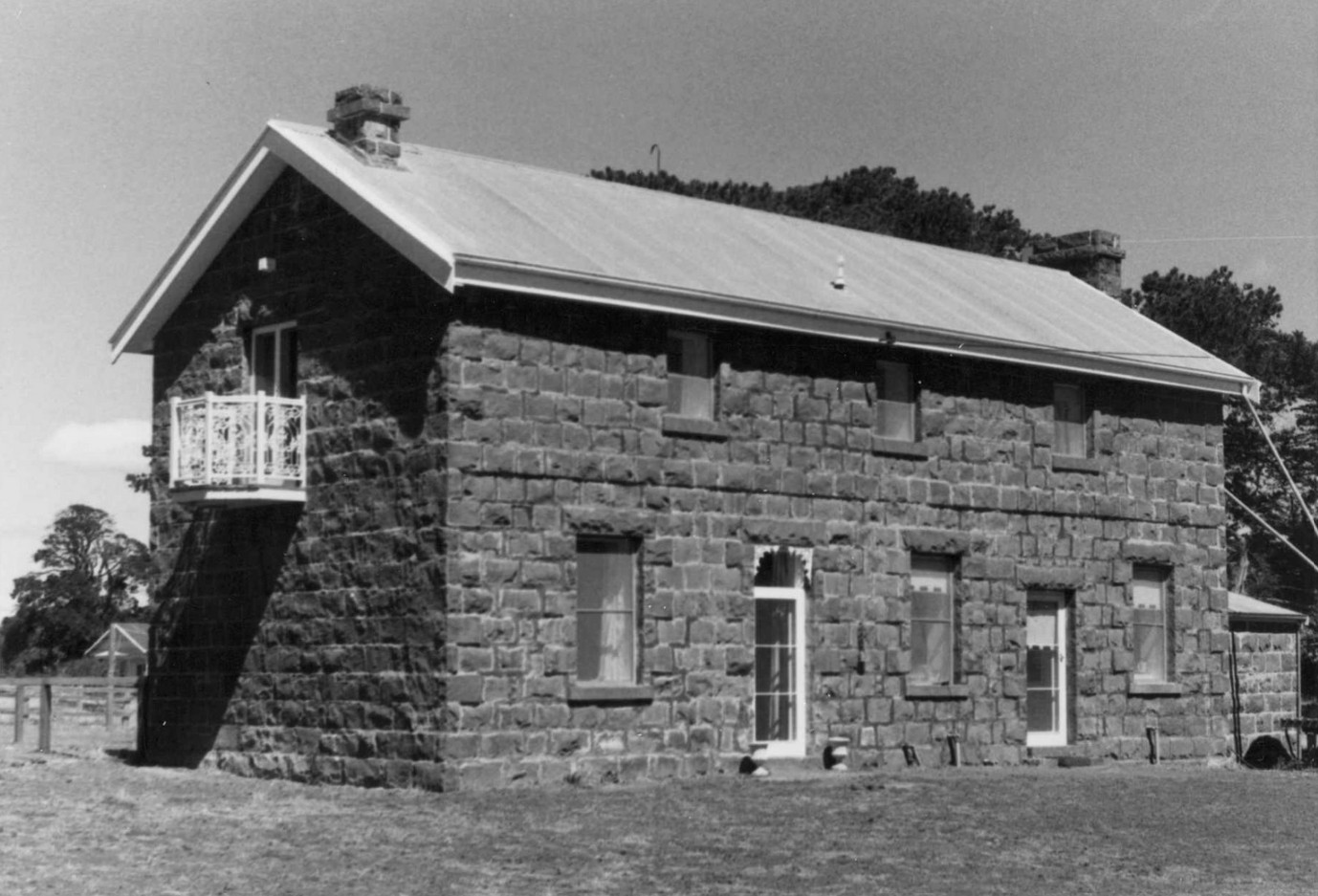
The cottage, where Sandra Clarke resided until her death, aged 103

The large pastoral holding remained substantially intact until the early twentieth century. Approximately 8,000 acres were sold in the early 1920s, and the remaining estate was subdivided into smaller holdings in 1928. The homestead, outbuildings, woolshed and approximately 5,132 acres (2,077 ha) were purchased in that year by Trevor Clarke and his mother Gertrude Clarke. Trevor Clarke was the great-grandson of pastoralist William John Turner Clarke ("Big" Clarke), one of Australia's largest landholders in the nineteenth century.

Trevor Clarke married Sandra Clarke in 1936 and operated Devon Park until his death in 1983, when ownership passed to his son Jim Clarke. Further alterations were made to the homestead during the Clarke family's ownership, including works in the 1930s overseen by architect Robert Hamilton, a Melbourne architect known for traditional residential designs. These additions reflected the conservative "Olde English" style popular among wealthy Australian families during the interwar period.

Susie Clarke (née Reid) moved to Devon Park from Lilydale in 1967 at the age of 20 after marrying Jim Clarke. Sandra Clarke continued to live on the property, residing for many years in the bluestone hut near the homestead until her death in 2010 at the age of 103. Jim Clarke died later that year aged 69, after which Susie Clarke continued to manage the property on behalf of her daughter Sarah Clarke, who inherited Devon Park. Sarah Clarke lives near Geelong with her husband and children.

== See also ==
- Blackwood Homestead
