= Russell Grimwade =

Australian chemist, botanist, industrialist and philanthropist (1879–1955)

Russell Grimwade (1934) Self-portrait

Sir Wilfrid Russell Grimwade CBE (15 October 1879 – 2 November 1955) was an Australian chemist, botanist, industrialist and philanthropist. He was the son of Frederick Sheppard Grimwade and brother of Harold Grimwade.

== Education ==
Grimwade was born at his father's mansion 'Harleston' in Caulfield, which was given in 1916 to his school Melbourne Grammar, from which he went to Ormond College at the University of Melbourne, where he earned a B.Sc. in science in 1901, then spent time in London to become familiar the latest developments in chemistry.

== Career ==
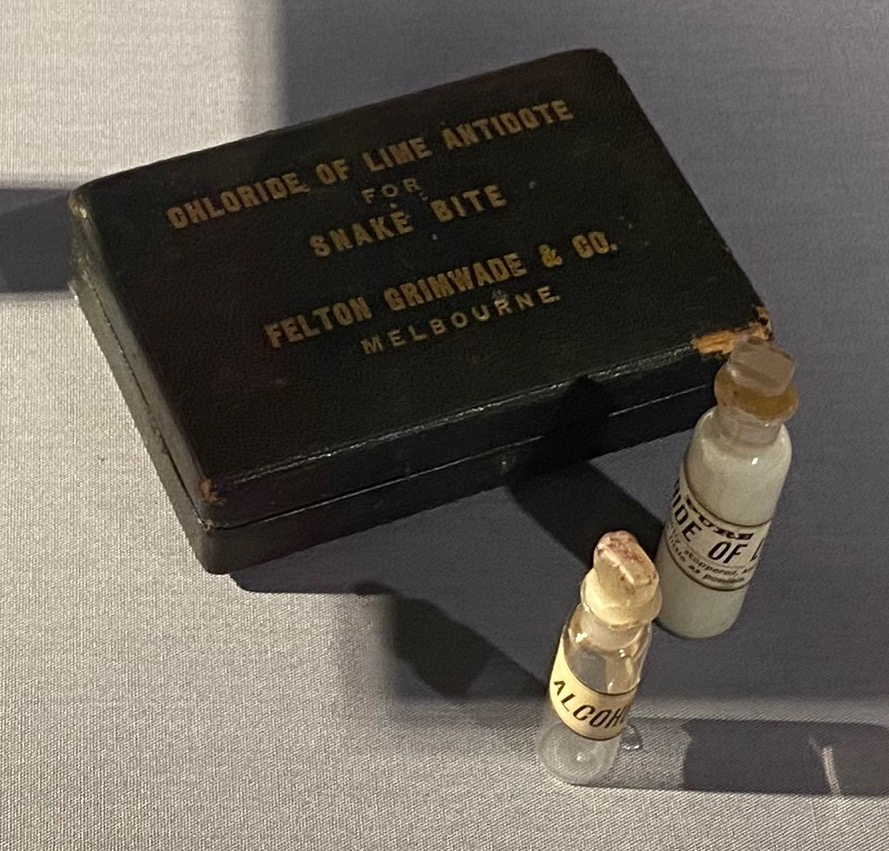
Calcium Hypochlorite Snakebite antidote by Felton Grimwade & Co

Grimwade then joined the family pharmaceutical firm Felton Grimwade & Company, as director of the new research laboratory in 1903 and was made a partner in 1907.

Grimwade's interest in photography dates from age 16, in early 1896. He was an accomplished amateur who as a teenager constructed his own darkroom and produced 35 albums over forty years, held now by Melbourne University, which document his many interests. Grimawade befriended Dr Julian Smith from whom he may have learned the carbon-transfer process. He published An anthography of the Eucalypt in 1921. He wrote the introduction to Smith's 1948 Fifty masterpieces of photography.

Become wealthy as his company diversified into such enterprises as the incorporation of Bosisto's Eucalyptus Oil, in 1909 he married Mabel Louise Kelly, and the couple lived at 'Miegunyah' in Orrong Road, its name is from an Aboriginal Australian language, meaning 'my house'.

Over his career, Grimwade was director of Drug Houses of Australia, Australian Glass Manufacturers, Cuming Smith & Company, and chaired the Walter and Eliza Hall Institute of Medical Research as well as the National Gallery of Victoria.

In 1924 Grimwade built 'Westerfield', a holiday home in Frankston South, set on 45 hectares (110 acres), completed in the Federation Arts and Crafts style.

== Forestry ==
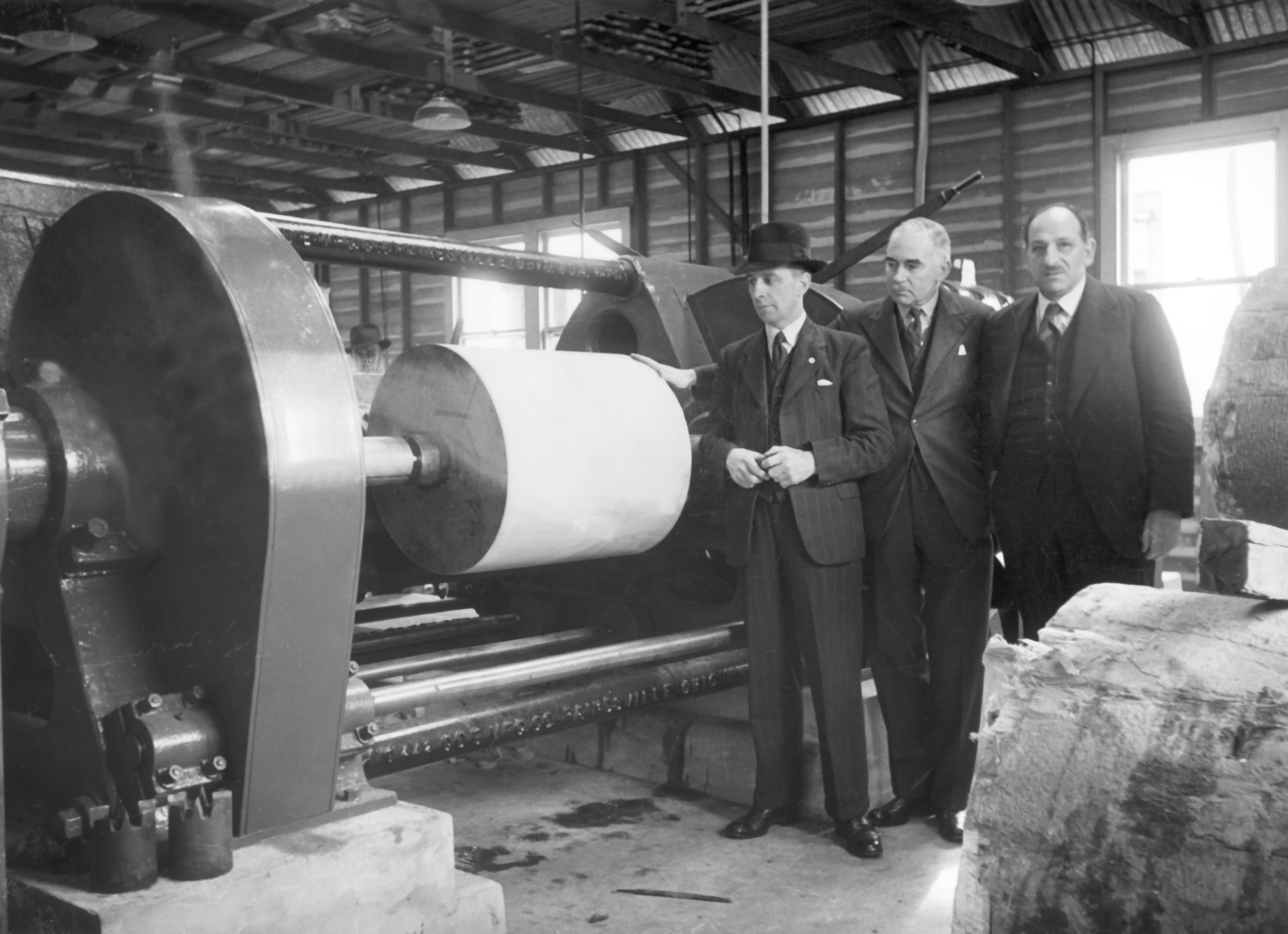
Chief Executive Officer, David Rivett, Russell Grimwade, who donated the lathe, and Isaac Boas, Chief of the Division of Forest Products, watching the peeling of the first log in the Veneer Laboratory.

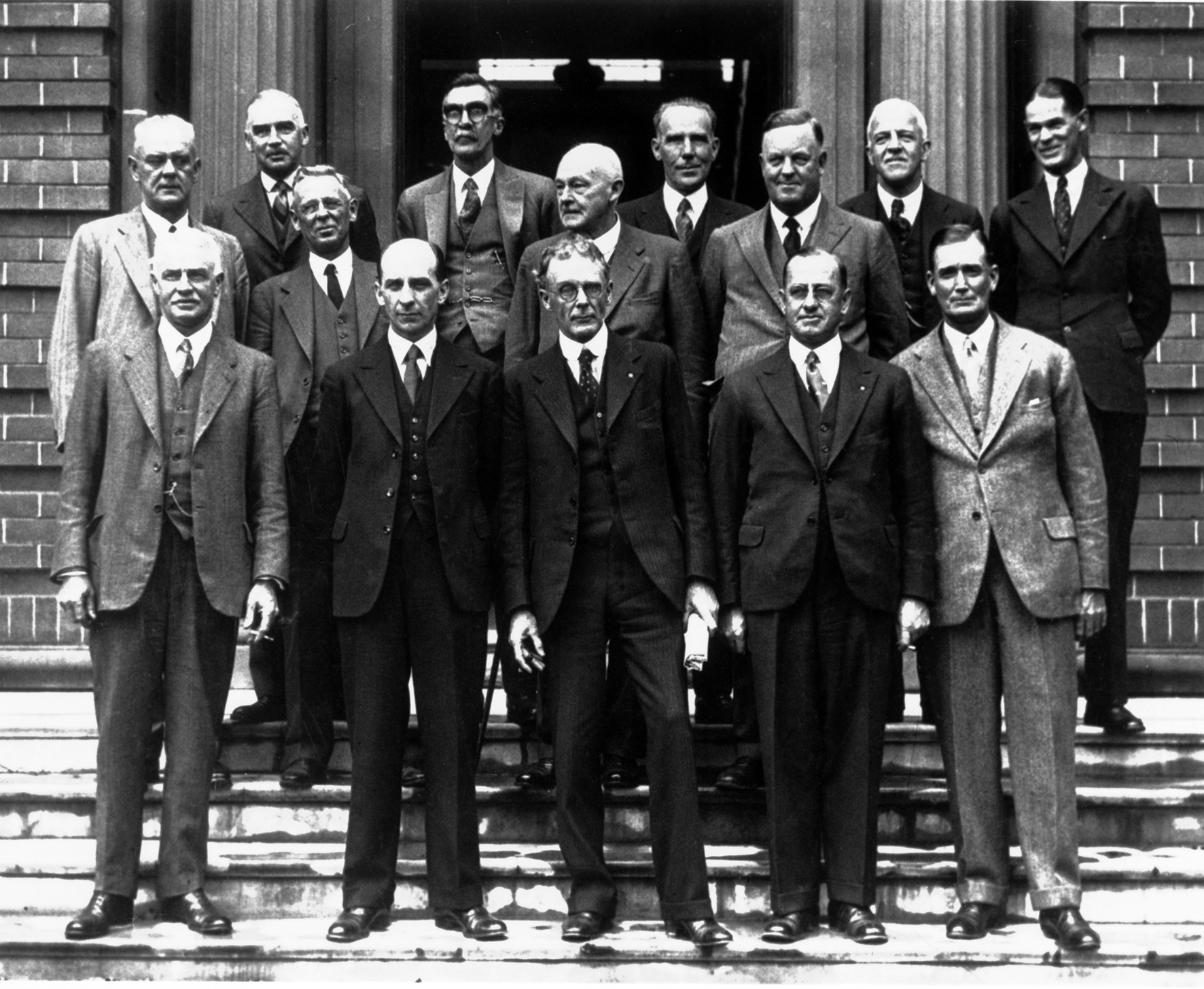
A CSIR Council Meeting at the McMaster Laboratory, Sydney in 1935 with Grimwade at left of back row

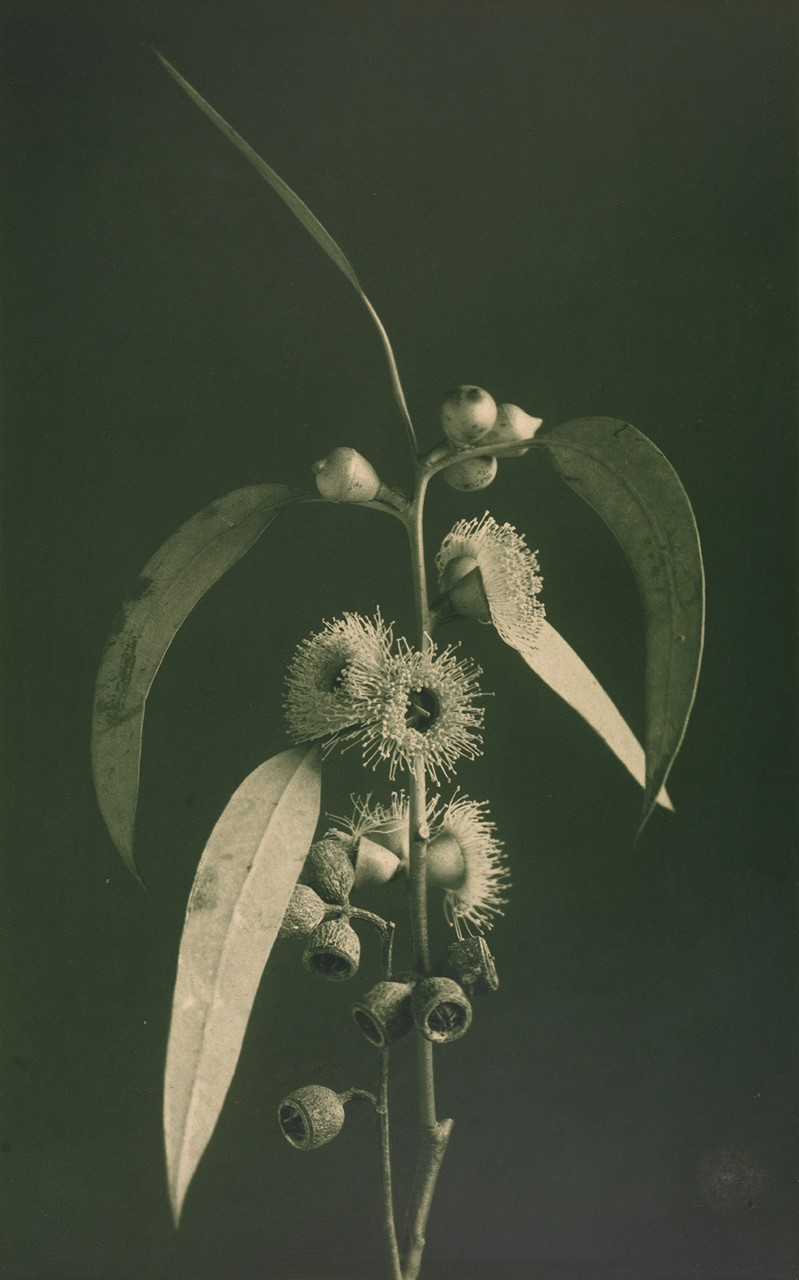
Russell Grimwade (c.1920) Eucalypt specimen photographic study. Carbon print

A vocal advocate for the appreciation and commercialisation of the eucalyptus, during the 1910s and 1920s Grimwade produced a book on the species, examining local examples in the Melbourne Botanic Gardens (where he served on its advisory committee) and other specimens suggested by gum-tree enthusiast associates. He planted them extensively in his Toorak garden and at his farm in Melbourne's south-east. An Anthography of the Eucalypts, illustrated with his own photographs of their flowers (carbon prints held now in The University of Melbourne Art Collection) was published in 1920 and expanded in 1930, and now, as noted by Bunbury, regarded as "important in its time for its accessible language and the quality of its illustrations".

An endowment by Grimwade in 1929 was used to create the Russell Grimwade Prize, a scholarship for study of forestry. As of 2018, the annual prize value is $40,000.

== Expedition ==
Late in his life, and over August-September 1947, with a forester, naturalist, entomologist, botanist, ethnologist, bird observers and plant collectors, he conducted the Russell Grimwade Expedition to South and Western Australia by road and tracks from east to west along the Great Australian Bight from Adelaide to Esperance, Albany and Perth, following roughly the route explored by Edward John Eyre 1840-41. Most of the specimens collected were known, but were useful additions to the National Herbarium and the National Museum. The expedition was recorded in the Memoirs of the Museum of Victoria.

== Honours ==
Grimwade was appointed a Commander of the British Empire (CBE) in 1935 and was knighted in the 1950 King's Birthday Honours List.

== Philanthropy and legacy ==
Grimwade donated £50,000 for a purpose-built facility to house the School of Biochemistry at the University of Melbourne, which bore his name from its construction in 1956 until its demolition in 2008.

He was an honorary member of the British Medical Association, and served on the advisory council that established the Council of Scientific and Industrial Research (now CSIRO), later sponsoring its forestry division.

In 1934, he presented Cooks' Cottage to Victoria after purchasing it in England and having dismantled and shipped to Australia.

An imprint of Melbourne University Press, named for his mansion 'Miegunyah', was established in 1967 under Grimwade's bequest to subsidise publication of illustrated scholarly works that would otherwise be uneconomic to publish. Grimwade's great-grandnephew Andrew Grimwade was its patron.
