= Harold Grimwade =

Australian general

Harold William Grimwade
- Official portrait of Major General Harold William Grimwade (1918)
- Born: 18 May 1869; St Kilda, Victoria
- Died: 2 January 1949 (aged 79); Frankston, Victoria
- Relatives: Frederick Sheppard Grimwade (father)
- Military career
- Allegiance: Australia
- Branch: Australian Army
- Service years: 1891–1930
- Rank: Major General
- Nickname: Grim Death
- Commands: 4th Division (1926–30); Artillery, Australian Corps (1918); 3rd Division Artillery (1916–18); 4th Field Artillery Brigade (1915–16)
- Conflicts: First World War; Western Front
- Awards: Companion of the Order of the Bath; Companion of the Order of St Michael and St George; Colonial Auxiliary Forces Officers' Decoration; Mentioned in Despatches (4); Croix de Guerre (France)

Major General Harold William Grimwade, CB, CMG, VD (18 May 1869 – 2 January 1949) was an Australian businessman and pharmacist, and a senior officer in the Australian Army.

== Early life and career ==
Harold William Grimwade was born on 18 May 1869 in St Kilda, Melbourne, the son of Frederick Sheppard Grimwade. Harold was educated at Melbourne Grammar School and the Queen Elizabeth School in Ipswich, Essex, England. He qualified as a pharmacist in London before returning to Australia. He became Felton Grimwade's warehouse manager and a partner in the company in 1893. In this role he displayed a considerable talent for leadership and management of employees.

Grimwade joined the Victorian Field Artillery in 1891 and was promoted to lieutenant colonel on 16 May 1910. In August 1914, he became Chief Embarkation Officer for Victoria.

== First World War ==
Grimwade joined the Australian Imperial Force as a lieutenant colonel on 26 August 1915 to command the 4th Field Artillery Brigade, a new unit formed for the 2nd Division. The formation of the 2nd Division Artillery drained Australia of guns and instructors and left the artillery in Australia badly depleted.

The 4th Field Artillery Brigade embarked for Egypt on 8 November 1915, arriving on 12 December. The 2nd Division Artillery thus missed the Gallipoli campaign and instead began intensive training for France. Initially the 4th Field Artillery Brigade was to be reassigned to the 4th Division but General Sir Archibald Murray ruled that the artillery must be provided on the British Expeditionary Force standard of 15 batteries per division rather than on the MEF one of just 9. Whereas the infantry in Egypt had to expand from 32 battalions to 48, the artillery was faced with an expansion from 18 batteries to 60. Priority was given to getting the 1st and 2nd Divisions' Artillery ready, and the 4th Field Artillery Brigade departed Alexandria for France on 12 March 1916.

On 10 July 1916, Grimwade was promoted to colonel and temporary brigadier general and appointed General Officer Commanding Royal Artillery (GOCRA) of the 3rd Division Artillery. Grimwade remained there training his new command for some months, until the 3rd Division Artillery was finally deployed to France on 31 December 1916. Although the division carried out a number of raids, its first major operation was at Messines in June 1917. For this battle, Grimwade had not only his own two brigades but also the AIF's three "Army" brigades (3rd, 6th and 12th) and two British brigades, a total of 120 18-pounder guns and 30 4.5-inch howitzers.

At Broodeseinde on 4 October 1917, Grimwade had his two brigades plus five British brigades. German counter-battery fire was fierce and the artillery and ammunition columns came under heavy fire. Despite casualties of the same order as the infantry, the gunners managed once again to produce a tremendous barrage, enabling the infantry to advance.

In January 1918, Grimwade was promoted to colonel in the Australian Military Forces. In a quiet sector of the line near Messines the 3rd Division, now part of the Australian Corps, spent the winter preparing for a German Offensive in the Spring. Grimwade and John Monash clashed with the new Corps Chief of Staff, Major General Brudenell White, over the placement of the artillery, which they felt was too far forward and would be overrun in the event of an enemy offensive. In the event, the initial German blow fell on the Somme sector to the south and the 3rd Division Artillery was rushed south to defend the river.

For the Battle of Amiens on 8 August 1918, Grimwade had control of 9 brigades of field and horse artillery. They fired the initial barrage and then took up defensive artillery positions. The gunners fired in support of the advance to the Hindenburg Line and beyond, and remained in the line after the infantry had been withdrawn, firing in support of the British and American armies.

On 14 November 1918, Grimwade became GOCRA of the Australian Corps. In response to a strike by men of the 3rd Division Artillery in January 1919, Grimwade resumed command and listened sympathetically to their troubles, attempted to rectify what he could, and promised to pass the rest on to an equally sympathetic corps commander, Lieutenant General Talbot Hobbs.

Grimwade had been made a Companion of the Order of St Michael and St George (CMG) in 1917 and a Companion of the Order of the Bath (CB) in 1918 and had been Mentioned in Despatches four times. He returned to Australia on 27 February 1919.

== Post-war service and death ==
From 1926 to 1930, Grimwade commanded the 4th Division.

In 1914, Grimwade purchased land at Mount Eliza and, post-war, rebuilt an established summer residence, Marathon. Set on 12 hectares (30 acres), the house and gardens were completed in 1924 in the Federation Arts and Crafts style, designed by Walter Butler, initially in partnership with Ernest Bradshaw, and later, with Butler's nephew, Richard. In 1992, Marathon, with its expansive garden, was added to the Victorian Heritage Register.

Grimwade died at Marathon on 2 January 1949.

== See also ==
- List of Australian generals
