= Frederick Sheppard Grimwade =

Australian politician and businessman

Frederick Sheppard Grimwade (10 November 1840 – 4 August 1910) was a businessman and Victorian member of parliament.

== Biography ==
Born in Norfolk, England, Grimwade arrived in Victoria in 1863. In 1867 he bought a pharmaceutical company and renamed it Felton Grimwade & Co., which soon became the largest in the colony, prospering well into the next century. Today some of Australia's largest public companies have a lineage going back to his family and businesses.

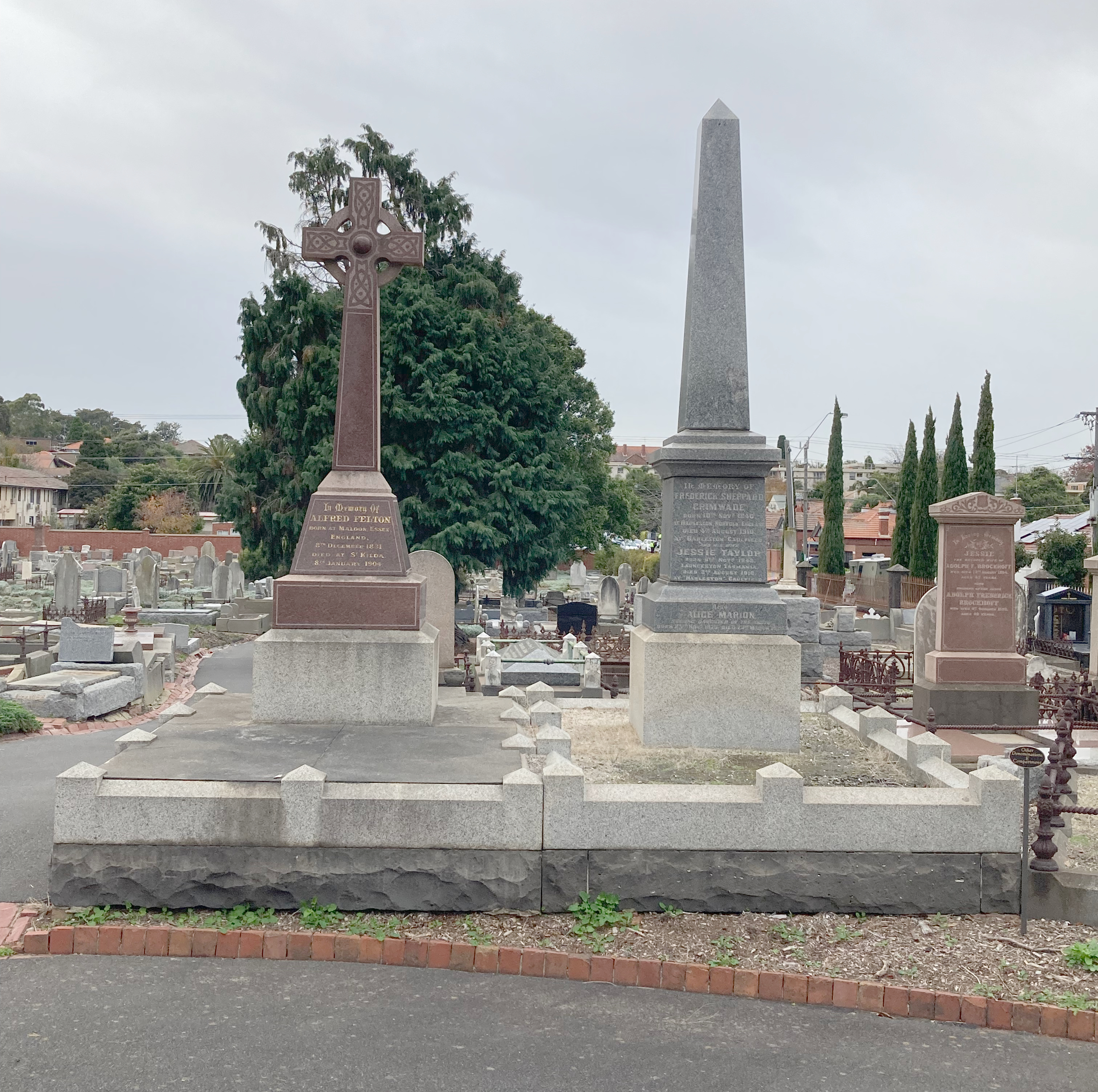
Graves of Alfred Felton (left) and Frederick Grimwade (right) at St Kilda Cemetery

Grimwade represented North Yarra Province in the Victorian Legislative Council from November 1891 to May 1904. He opposed gambling, workers' compensation, old-age pensions and the national harmonization of time zones, but he passionately and successfully advocated for the legalization of cremation.

== Legacy ==
Frederick Grimwade was buried in St Kilda Cemetery on 5 August 1910. His mansion, "Harleston" (1875), was later donated by his family to Melbourne Grammar School and renamed Grimwade House. His country retreat at Somers on the Mornington Peninsula, "Coolart", eventually became a public wetlands reserve.

Grimwade's children included Major General Harold Grimwade, who was a businessman and pharmacist and served as an artillery officer in France during World War I, and Russell Grimwade, who was a chemist, botanist, industrialist and philanthropist.
