= William Sangster =

Australian garden designer (1831–1910)

- Born: 1831; Old Deer, Aberdeenshire, Scotland
- Died: 6 April 1910 (aged 78–79); Toorak, Victoria, Australia
- Burial place: St Kilda Cemetery
- Occupations: Nurseryman and Garden Designer
- Known for: Designing public and private gardens.

William Sangster (1831 – 6 April 1910) was a Scottish-born nurseryman and garden designer known for establishing public and private gardens in Melbourne, Australia, during its early development. He helped introduce the picturesque style of landscape design to Melbourne and the surrounding region.

His notable designs for public gardens include Carlton Gardens in Carlton, Daylesford Public Garden at Wombat Hill, and Victoria Gardens in Prahran. His notable designs for private gardens include Como House in South Yarra, Rupertswood in Sunbury, Rippon Lea Estate in Elsternwick, Stonington mansion in Malvern, and Ard Choille at Mount Macedon, Victoria.

In the 1880s, he wrote extensively for The Australasian newspaper using the pseudonym "Hortensis".

== Life and career ==
Sangster was born in Old Deer in the district of Buchan, Aberdeenshire, Scotland. He worked in the gardens at Hamilton Palace near Glasgow, which is said to have profoundly influenced his design style. He immigrated to Victoria, Australia in December 1853, at the age of 22. He initially worked at the Royal Botanic Gardens in Melbourne under Curator John Dallachy, whom he had worked under at Hamilton Palace. After that, he worked for nine months as a gardener for Mr. Dickenson at Mt. Pleasant near the vicinity of Kensington Road in South Yarra.

In December 1855, John Brown appointed Sangster head gardener and overseer at Como House. In this time, Sangster oversaw the design and development of the site using the principles of picturesque garden design. The design incorporated an elaborate five-acre ornamental garden and a new carriageway from the main road (now Toorak Road) on the northern boundary. He also established several orchards and vegetable gardens on the slopes down to the river, and he planted willows, poplars, and Dutch elms along the southern Yarra River boundary. Many elements of his design remain. He married Janet Yates in Melbourne in 1856. In 1864 Brown’s bank foreclosed and the property was sold to George Armytage; Sangster remained until mid-1866.

In mid-1866, Sangster left to form a partnership with William Taylor. In 1864, Taylor had established the Vice-Regal Nursery at the corner of Toorak Road and Wallace Ave after working at the Government House in Toorak. With the arrival of Sangster, the business was formally renamed Taylor & Sangster and known as the Toorak Nursery. This business continued until the site was sold by his daughter, Jane Yates Sangster, in 1907.

Between 1874 and 1876, Sangster worked at Rupertswood, Sunbury, where he designed a pleasure garden for Sir William Clarke on a 60-acre site. Sangster created the gardens surrounding the house using many picturesque elements, including a rockery, gullies, lakes, an excavated gully fernery, and artificially created hills and dales.

In 1875, Taylor & Sangster established a nursery business at Mount Macedon. Sangster's daughter, Jane Yates Sangster, inherited his share of the nursery following his death. She acquired the nursery outright in 1912 and ran it until she sold it in 1930.

In February 1879, Sangster was engaged as a contractor to redesign and redevelop the Carlton Gardens in preparation for the 1880 Melbourne International Exhibition.

During the 1880s, Sangster wrote extensively for The Australasian newspaper using the pseudonym "Hortensis".

Between 1881 and 1884, Sangster was engaged as a consultant by Frederick Thomas Sargood for significant redesign work at Rippon Lea Estate, Elsternwick. In 1882, the flower beds were replaced. In 1883, the lakes were significantly expanded, and the hill and lookout were created.

In 1884, the Daylesford Borough Council commissioned William Taylor and William Sangster to redesign and create the Daylesford Public Garden at Wombat Hill (now Wombat Hill Botanic Gardens). The design was based around the extinct volcano of Wombat Hill; little remains except the cascade and fernery.

The Victoria Gardens, Prahran were designed and created by Sangster in 1885. The design remains relatively intact with only minor changes made to the scheme by Edna Walling in the 1940s. The plan of the original design is held by Stonington History Centre and has notations by Sangster.

Stonington mansion, Malvern, was built in 1890 for John Wagner, a partner in Cobb & Co coaches. In 1892, he commissioned Sangster to design and create the gardens. The design included a large terrace at the rear, extensive lawns, parterres, and shrubberies with an orchard and vegetable garden beyond.

In 1896, Sangster designed and oversaw the creation of Ard Choille on the north side of Mount Macedon, which is notable for the intactness of his original design. The steep site was planted with a collection of rhododendrons and other plants requiring a cool, temperate climate. Sangster used the steep terrain to create terraces, mini “lochs”, and a series of three cascades using a water reticulation system.

== Death ==
In 1910, William Sangster died at the age of 79 in Toorak, Melbourne, Australia. He is buried with his family at St Kilda Cemetery.
