= Rippon Lea Estate =

Historic house and gardens in Melbourne, Australia

Coordinates: 37.8792°S 144.9995°E

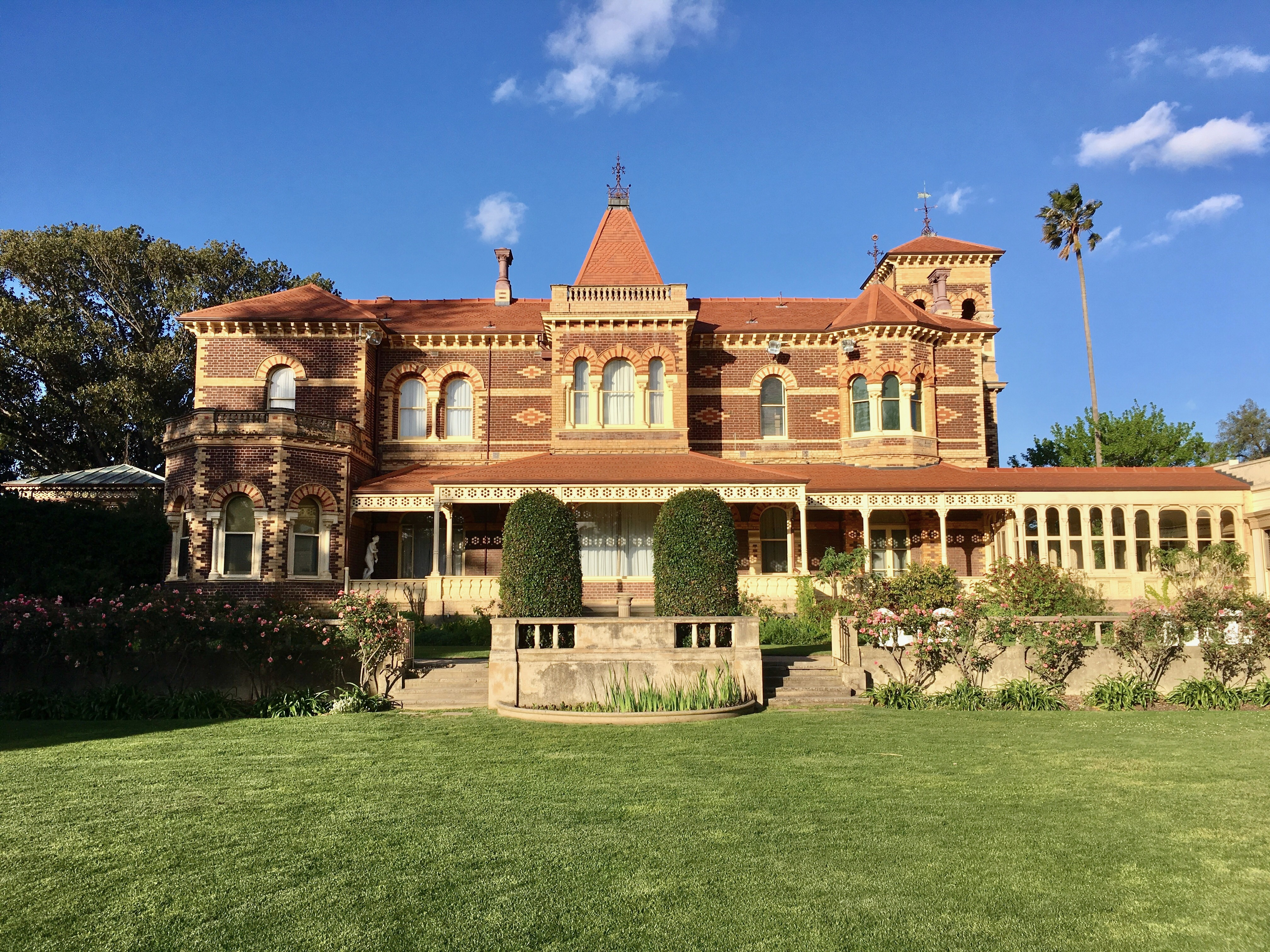

General information
- Location: Elsternwick, Melbourne, Victoria, Australia
- Owner: Sir Frederick Sargood

Website
- www.ripponleaestate.com.au

Victorian Heritage Register
- Official name: Rippon Lea
- Type: State Registered Place
- Designated: February 19, 1986
- Reference no.: H0614
- Heritage Overlay number: HO36

Rippon Lea Estate is a heritage-listed historic house and gardens located in Elsternwick, Melbourne, Victoria, Australia. It is in the care of the National Trust of Australia. It was added to the Australian National Heritage List on 11 August 2006.

== History ==
The Rippon Lea mansion and garden was created for Sir Frederick Sargood, a wealthy Melbourne businessman, politician, and philanthropist. In 1868, Frederick and his wife, Marion, purchased Crown Allotment 253 and either all or part of Crown Allotment 260 in the Parish of Prahran, Elsternwick, giving them a total area of 11 hectares (26 acres) about 8 kilometres from the Melbourne central business district, just outside the built-up area of the city. The Rippon Lea Estate was soon joined by similar large estates. Sargood named the property after his mother, Emma Rippon, adding lea, an old English word for meadow. He commissioned a two-storey, 15-room house designed by architect Joseph Reed of Reed & Barnes. Like other mansion estates in Melbourne, an extensive pleasure garden was laid out around the house, together with glasshouses, vegetable gardens and orchards developed over the next three decades. The gardens were more elaborate than most, designed to be self-sufficient with regards to water, with the large man-made lake on the property gathering storm water run-off from the surrounding area. By the late 1870s, Rippon Lea was a total of 18 hectares (45 acres) with the kitchen garden alone taking up 0.81 hectares (2 acres). From 1881, William Sangster was engaged as a consultant by Frederick Sargood for significant redesign work on the garden. In 1882, the flower beds were replaced. In October 1882, Head Gardener Adam Anderson arrived after being recruited by Mr. Sargood in England. In 1883, the lakes were significantly expanded and the hill and lookout were created according to Sangster's recommendations.

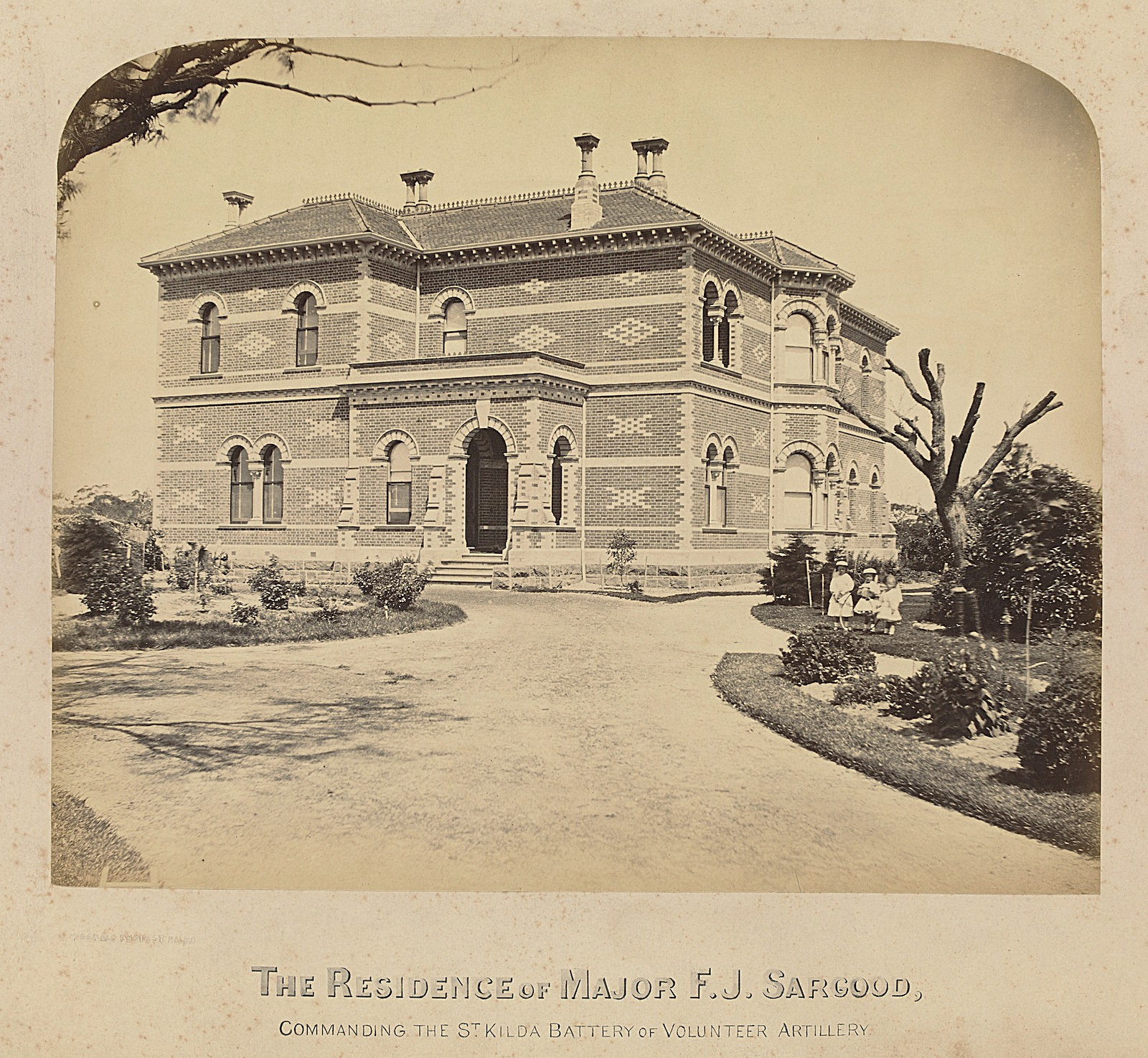
Rippon Lea in the 1870s

The style of the house has been described as "Lombardic Romanesque", a term coined by Joseph Reed to describe the elaborate polychrome patterned brickwork he introduced to Melbourne, which he said was inspired by the architecture of the Lombardy region of northern Italy, but which also had parallels in England at the time. Over the 1880s and 1890s, the house was extended on several occasions in matching style, not always by Reed. One alteration was converting the conservatory on the south side of the house into an arched roofed ballroom that could fit 500 people, and then adding the current huge shade house for palm trees further to the south. The Sargoods entertained extensively with fêtes, charitable balls and garden parties. The last changes occurred in 1897, when the house was extended to the north, and the port cochere and tower were added. The house also contained many innovations. It was one of the first in Australia to be lit by electricity, which was produced by its own generators. A full-time electrician was employed to maintain the system, and the fittings included an electrically powered bell system to communicate with the servants' quarters and kitchens downstairs.

Upon Frederick's death in 1903, the property was sold to a consortium of real estate developers who had plans to demolish the house and subdivide the land, since Elsternwick at this time was a developing suburb on the outskirts of Melbourne. Adam Anderson remained as head gardener but departed in 1903.

The house was empty for six years while the developers sold off various parcels of land, particularly the orchards and paddocks. However, before the final carve-up of the estate could be undertaken, the leader of the consortium, Sir Thomas Bent, died, and the property was put on the market in 1910.

It was bought by Ben and Agnes Nathan, who owned the Maples chain of furniture stores in Melbourne. The Nathans lived there until Ben's death in 1935. The property then passed to their eldest daughter, Louisa, along with a legacy of £1 million.

Louisa (married name, Mrs. Timothy Jones) was a leading figure in the Melbourne social set in the 1930s. She undertook extensive remodelling and renovation of the house to allow her to entertain on a lavish scale. Much of the interior of the house was redecorated while leaving some Victorian features intact. For example, the wallpaper in the entrance hall and corridors (originally embossed in gold) was over-painted in rich cream, while a new dining room featured brocades and tapestry fabrics.

The Sargood's ballroom was demolished to make way for a lavish Hollywood-style swimming pool and a new ballroom in a glamorous 1930s Hollywood style. Mrs. Jones also installed a new modern kitchen on the ground level, and the original basement kitchen and service areas were closed up, which preserved many of the surviving 19th-century features of this section of the house, including the cool room, the wine cellar and the large fuel stove. The 5.7 hectares (14 acres) of gardens were maintained.

In preparation for the 1956 Olympic Games in Melbourne, a section of the property was sold by a family member while Louisa was overseas in 1954 to the Australian Broadcasting Corporation (ABC) Victorian government to house a new television studio complex. The Rippon Lea studios then became the ABC's Melbourne home and in later years were used as the production centre for many renowned programs including Bellbird, Countdown, The Big Gig and The Late Show.

In 1963, the Commonwealth Government announced their intention to compulsorily acquire the main part of the garden, with the lake and lookout, setting off public protests and long-running legal action by Mrs Jones. She eventually settled with the government, agreeing that, on her death, the house and the land still in her possession would be bequeathed to the National Trust, allowing it to remain intact in perpetuity. She died on 27 July 1972, and the house finally opened to the public in 1974. During the 1970s and 1980s the Vernon Family resided in the gate house.

Of particular note on the grounds are the lake, the iron-framed fernery, the swimming pool and associated ballroom and the stable complex (1868). The rooms of the basement kitchen complex are also of special interest, having been built in the 1880s and then abandoned in 1938 following the installation of a modern kitchen on the ground floor. Today, they are a rare surviving Australian example of a 19th-century kitchen suite, comprising a kitchen, scullery, pantries, cool rooms, servants' hall and wine cellar.

== Gallery ==
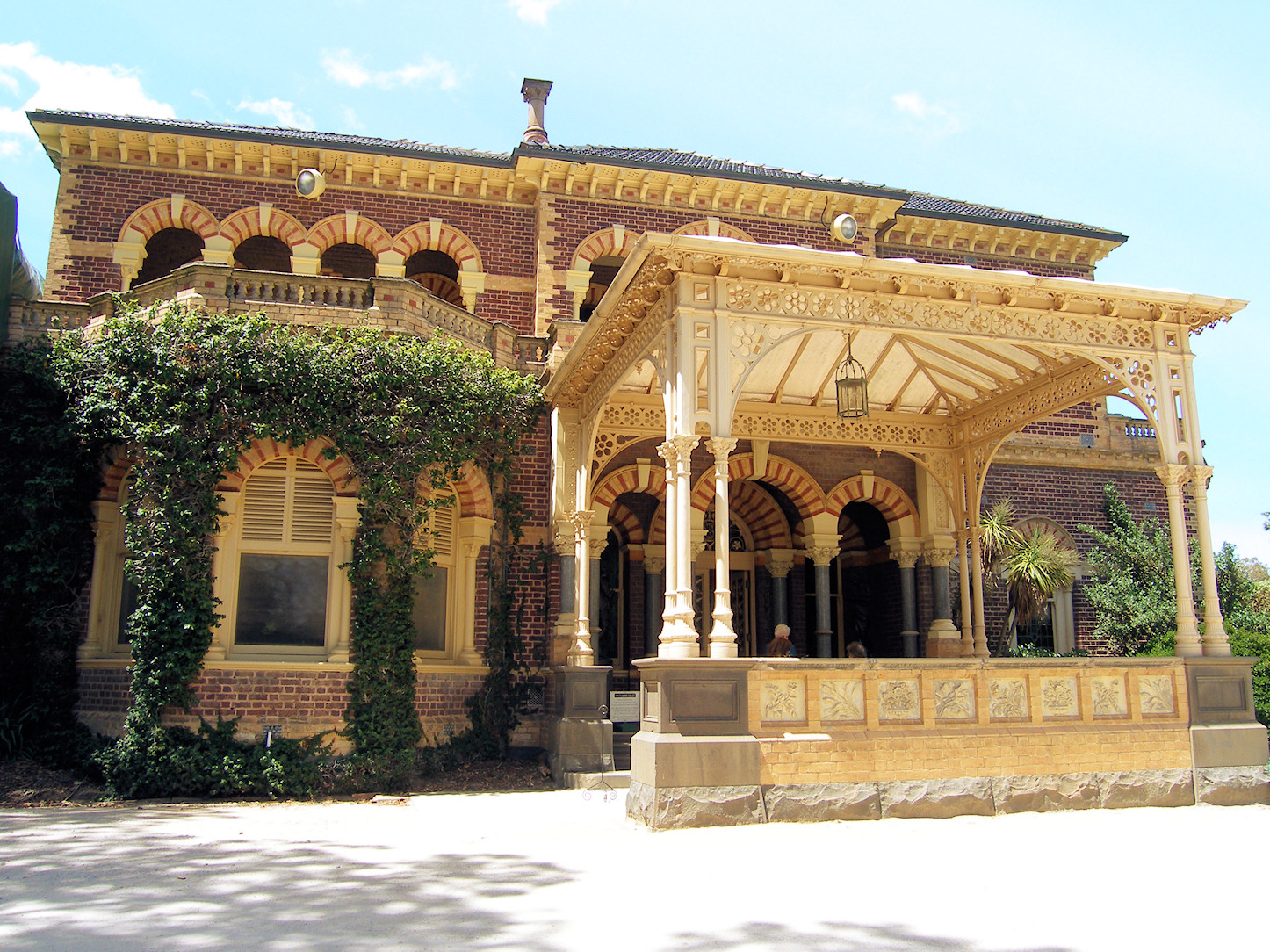
The porte-cochere

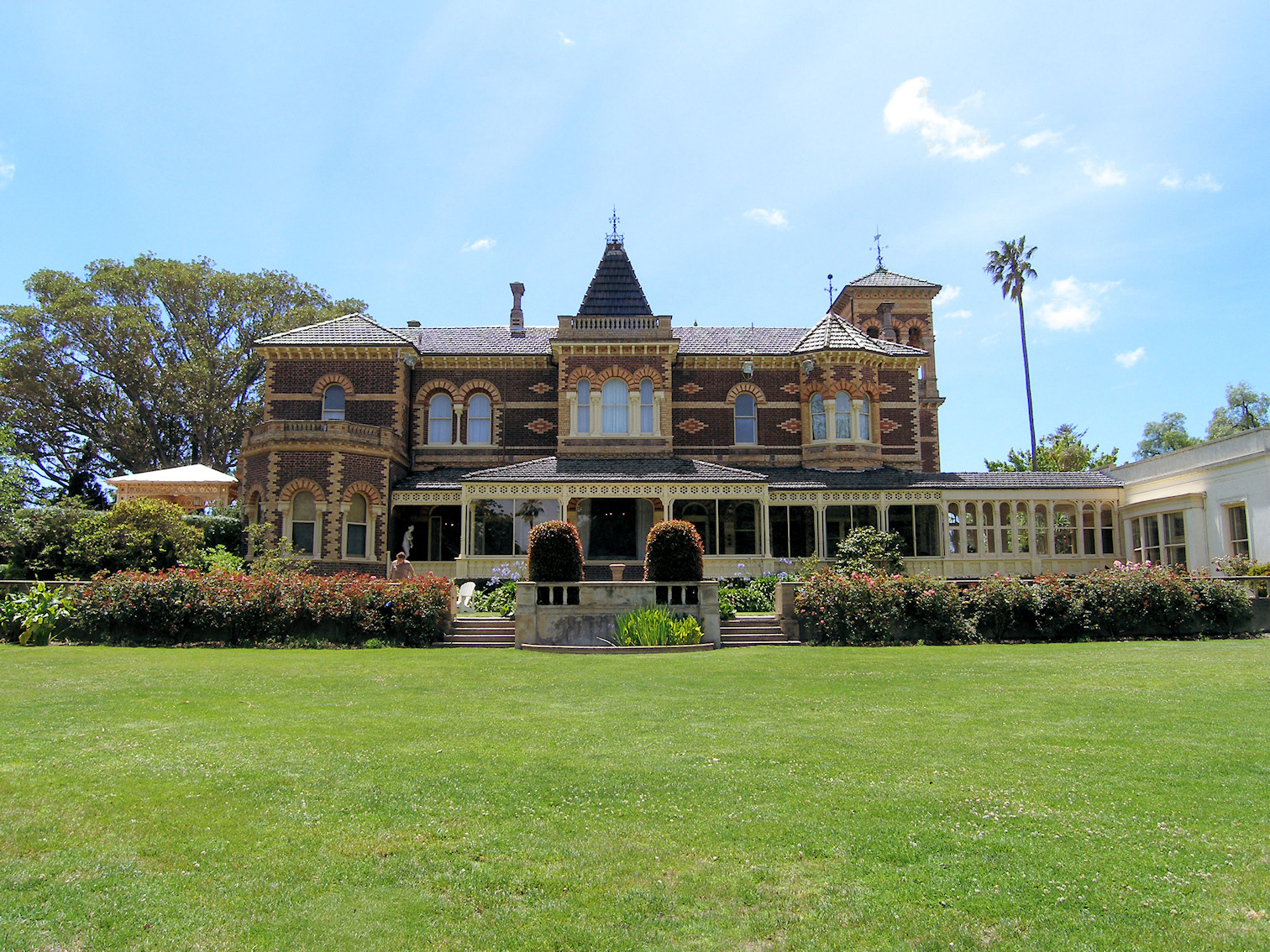
View of the house from the lawn

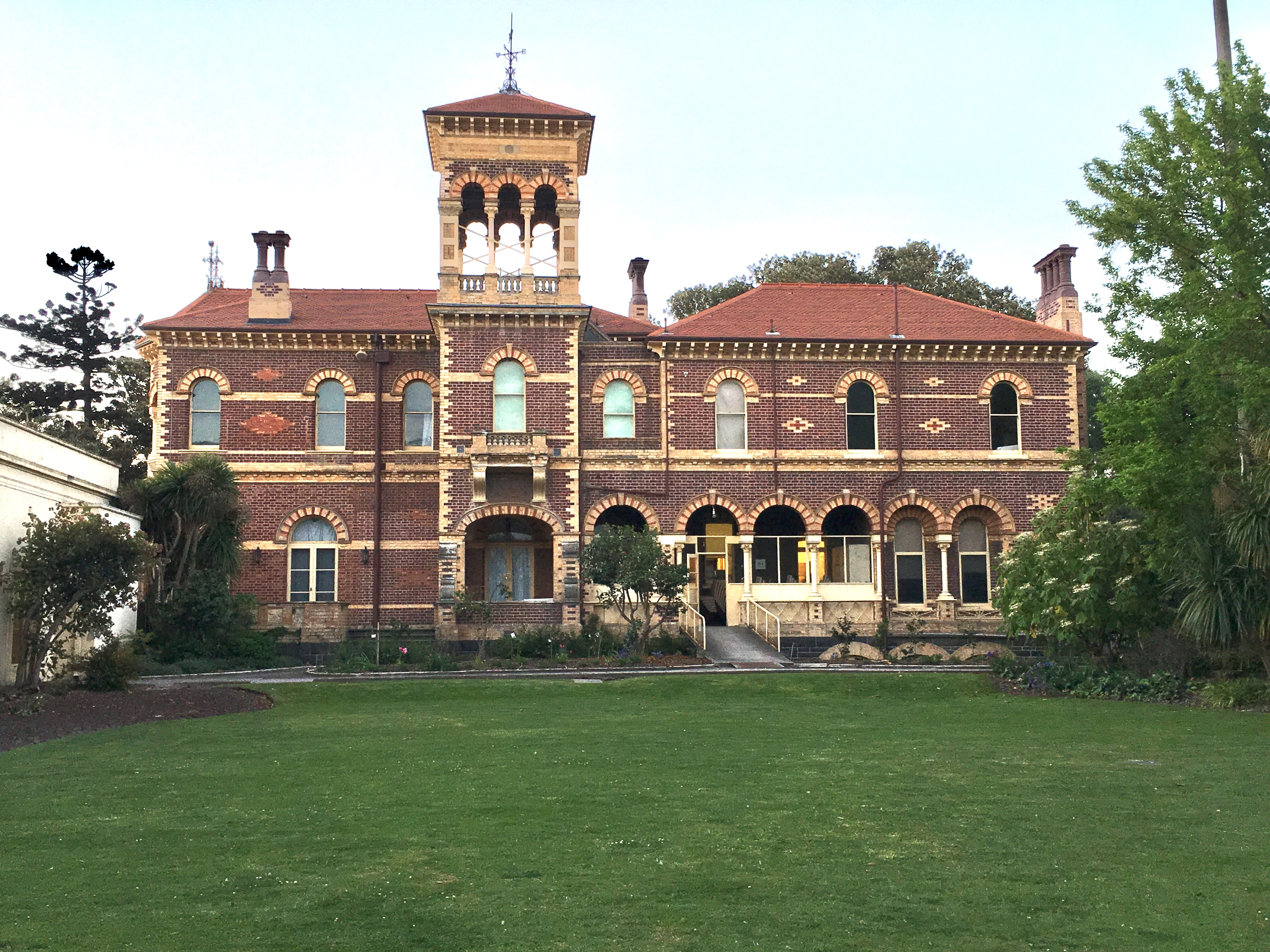
South front

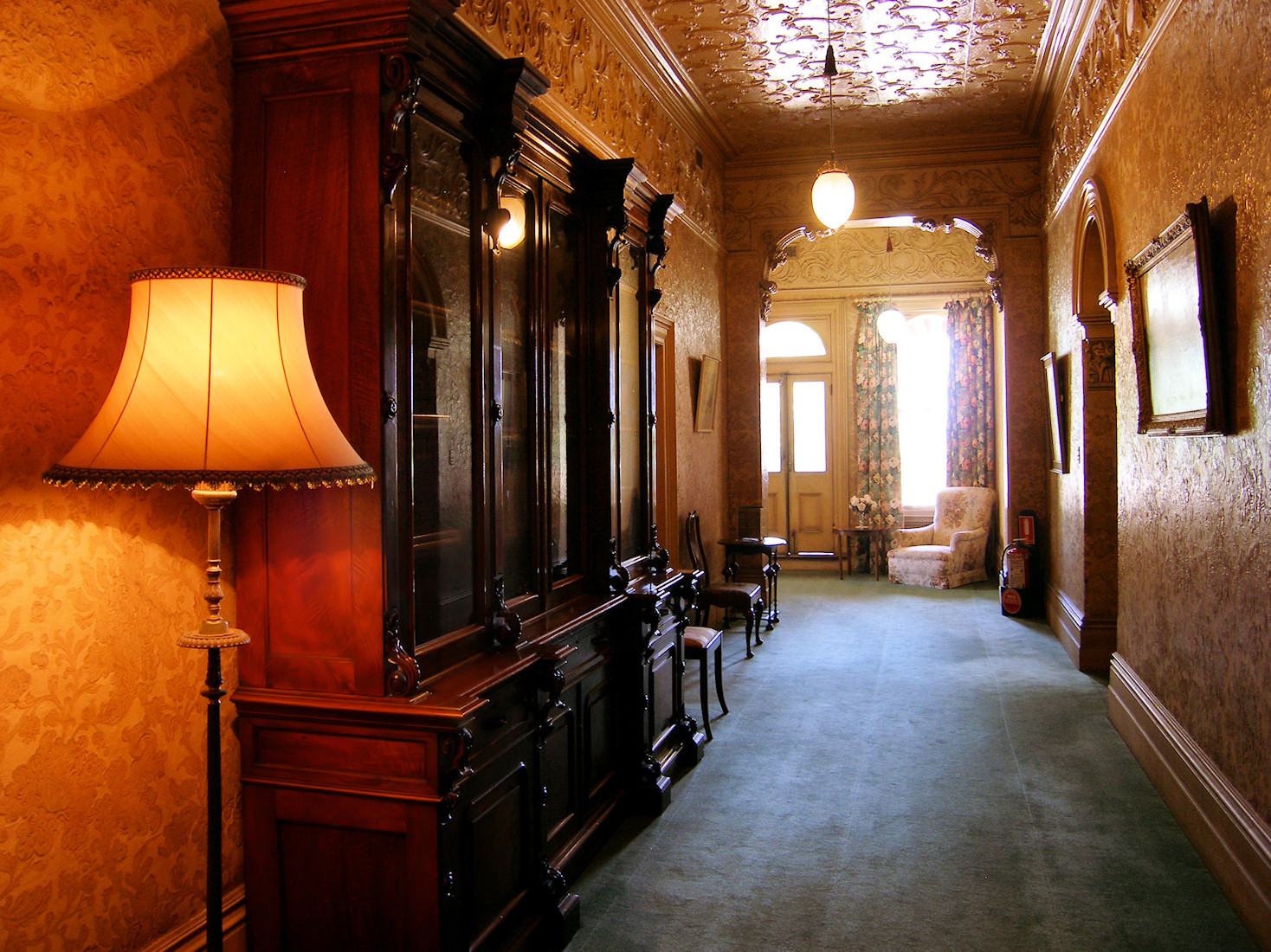
The hallway on the 1st floor

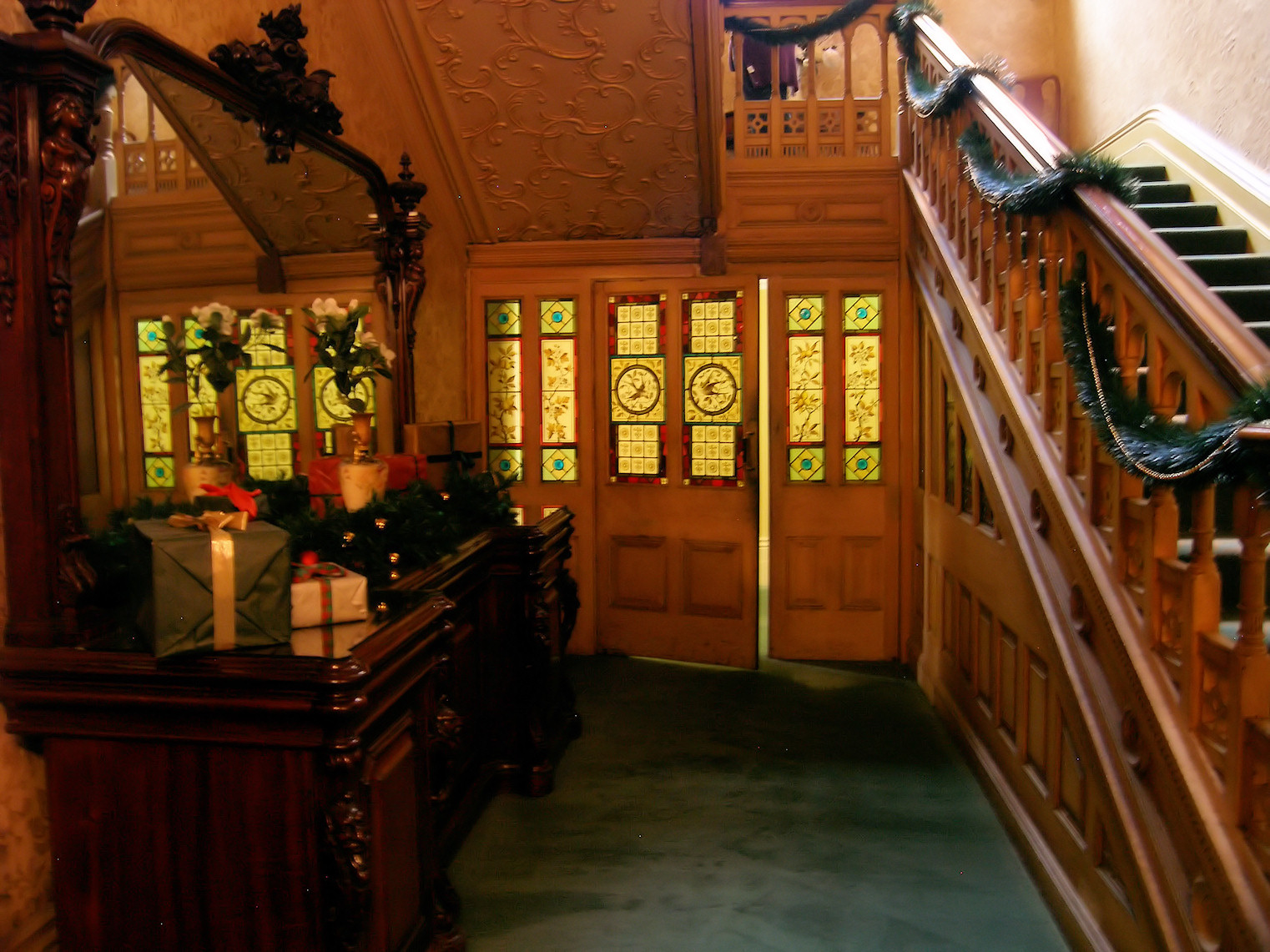
Ground floor doors leading to servants areas. House decorated for Christmas as photograph was taken in mid December

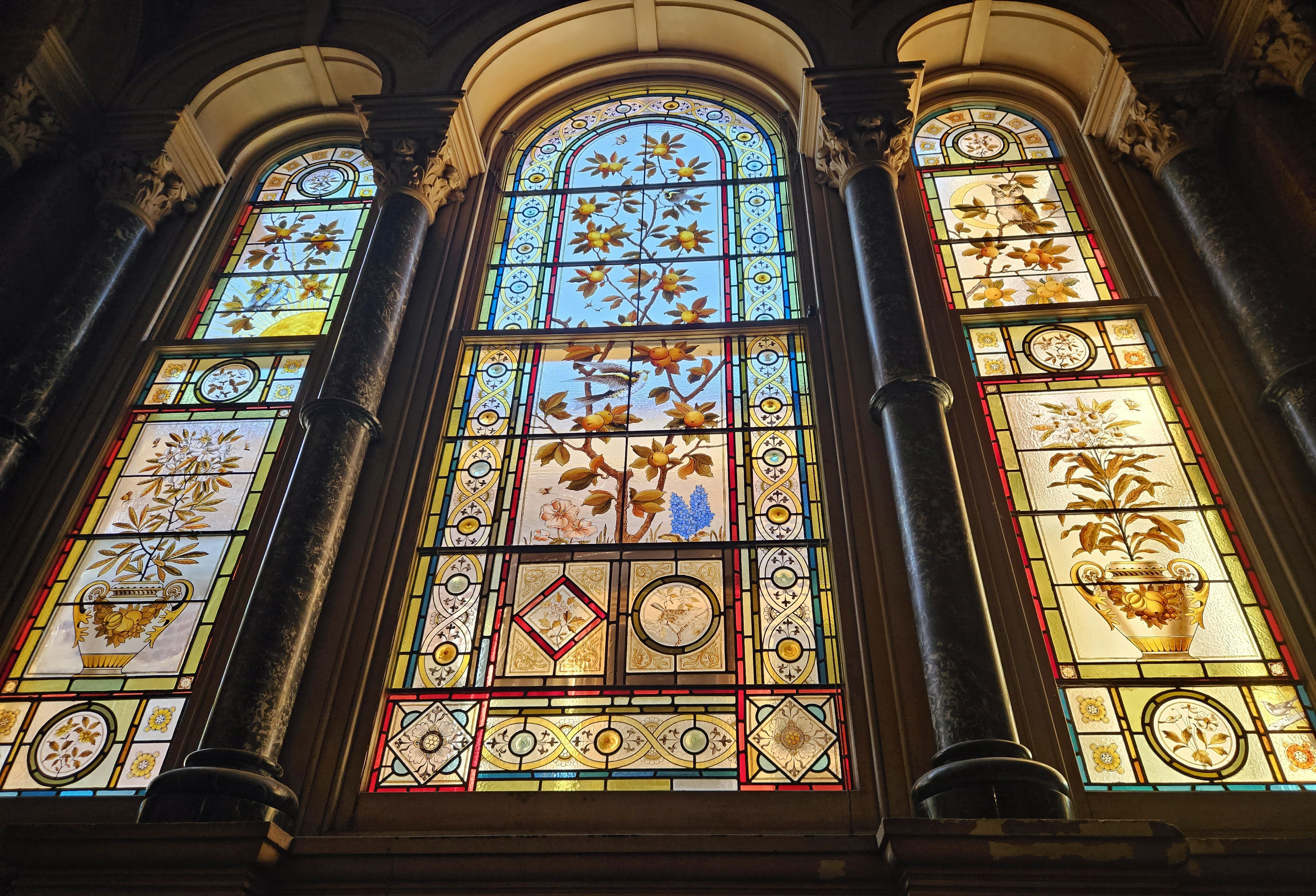
Stained glass windows in the mansion stairwell

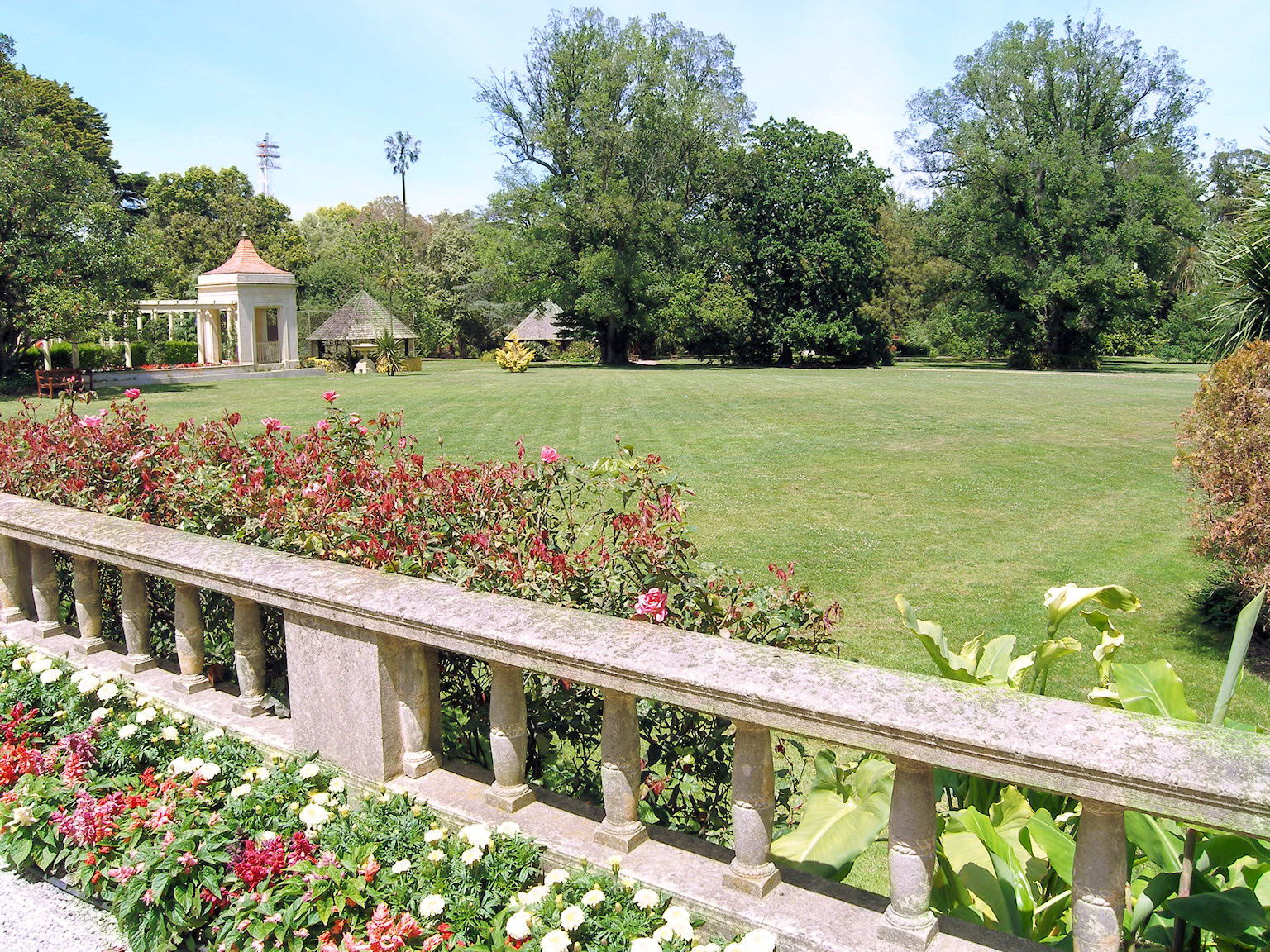
View of the lawns

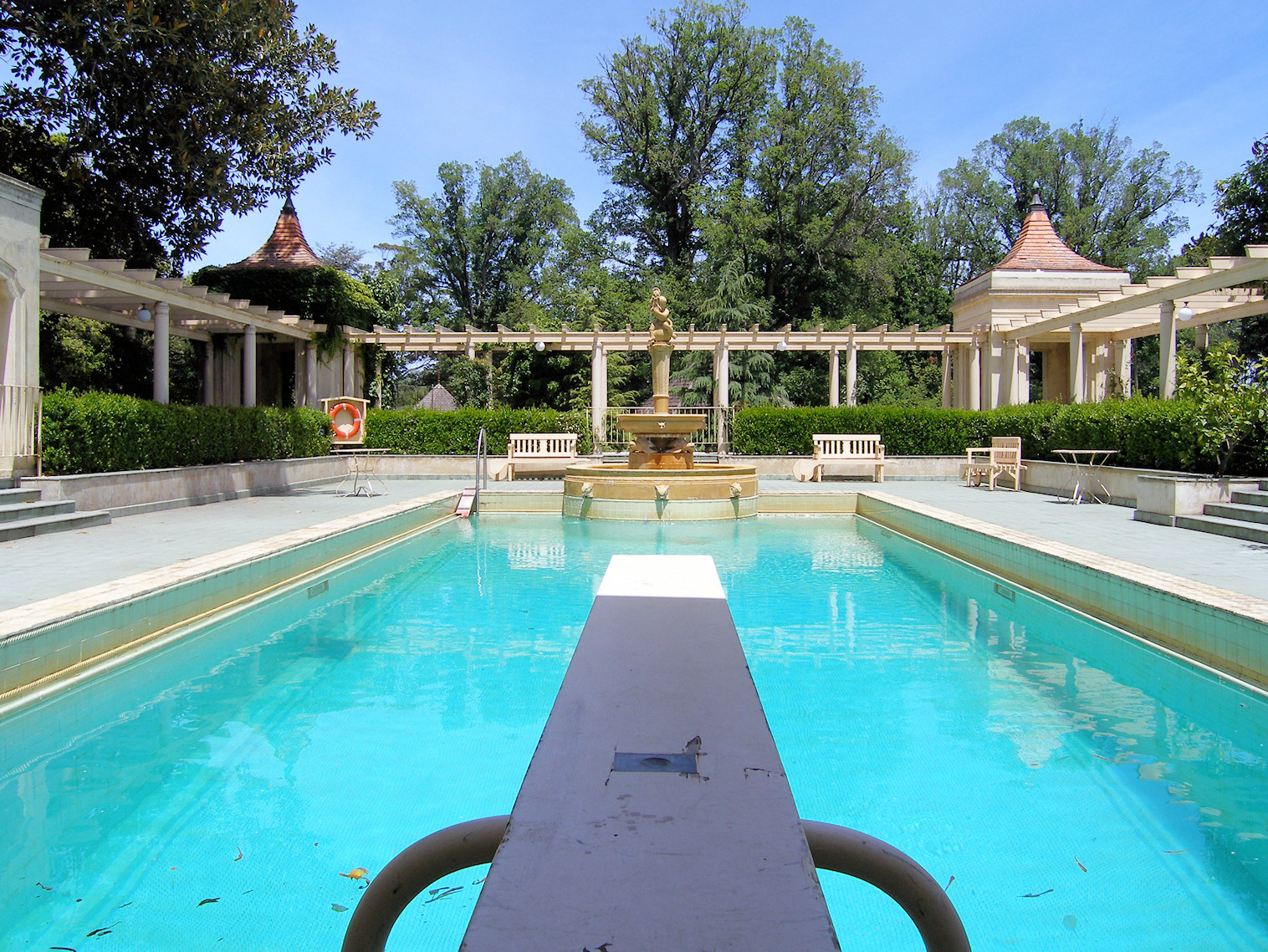
The swimming pool

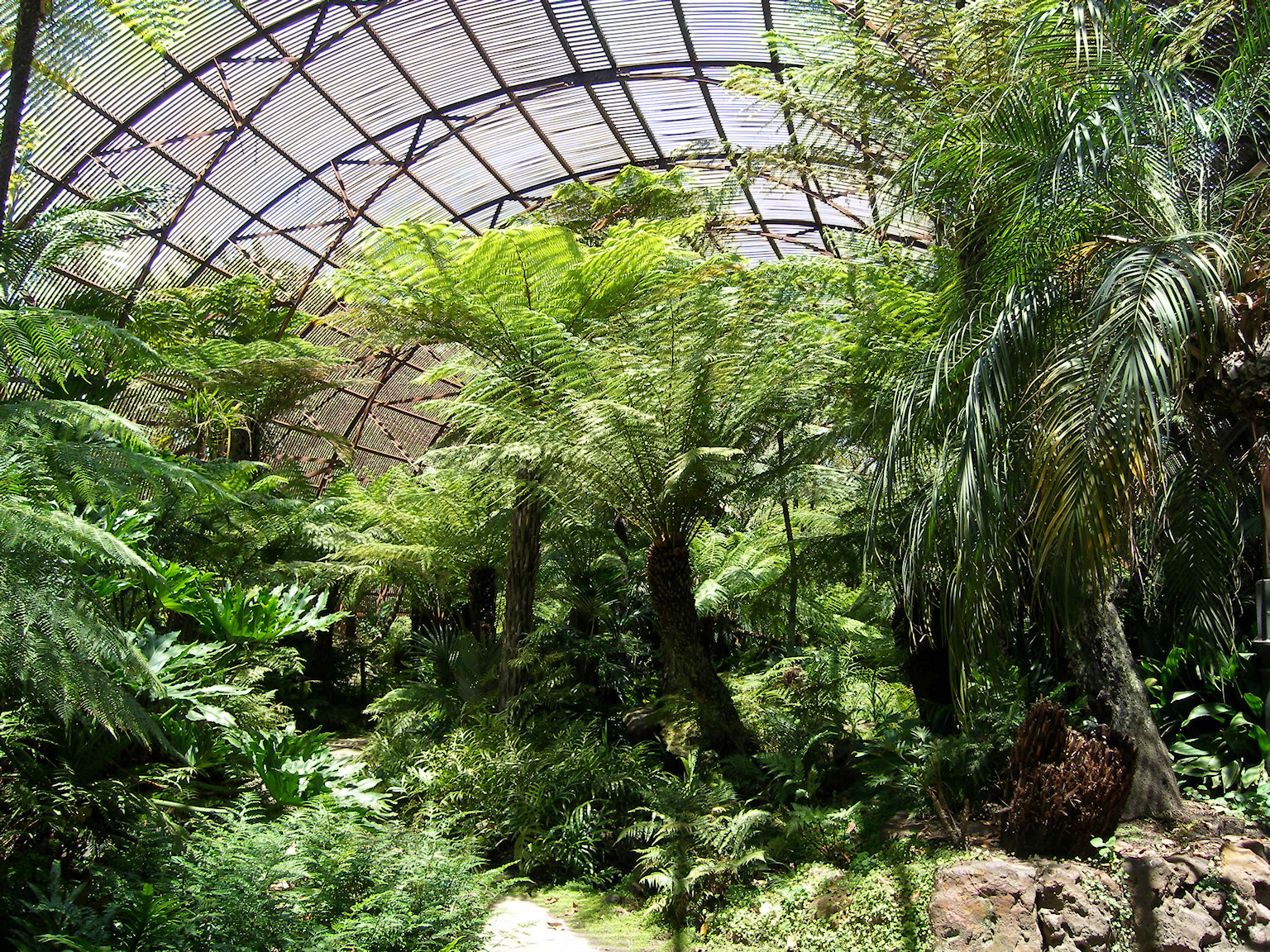
Fernery

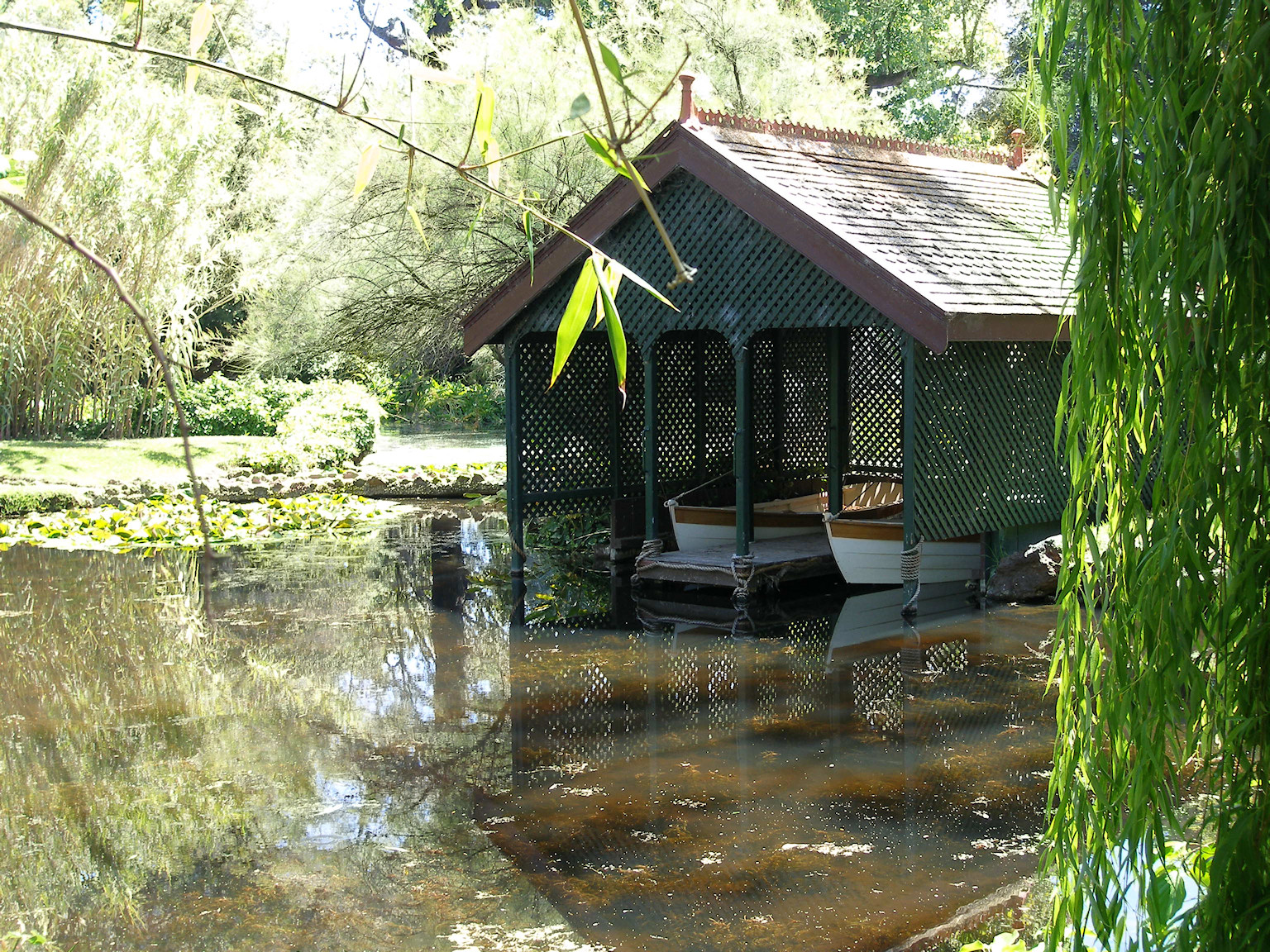
The small boat house on the lake

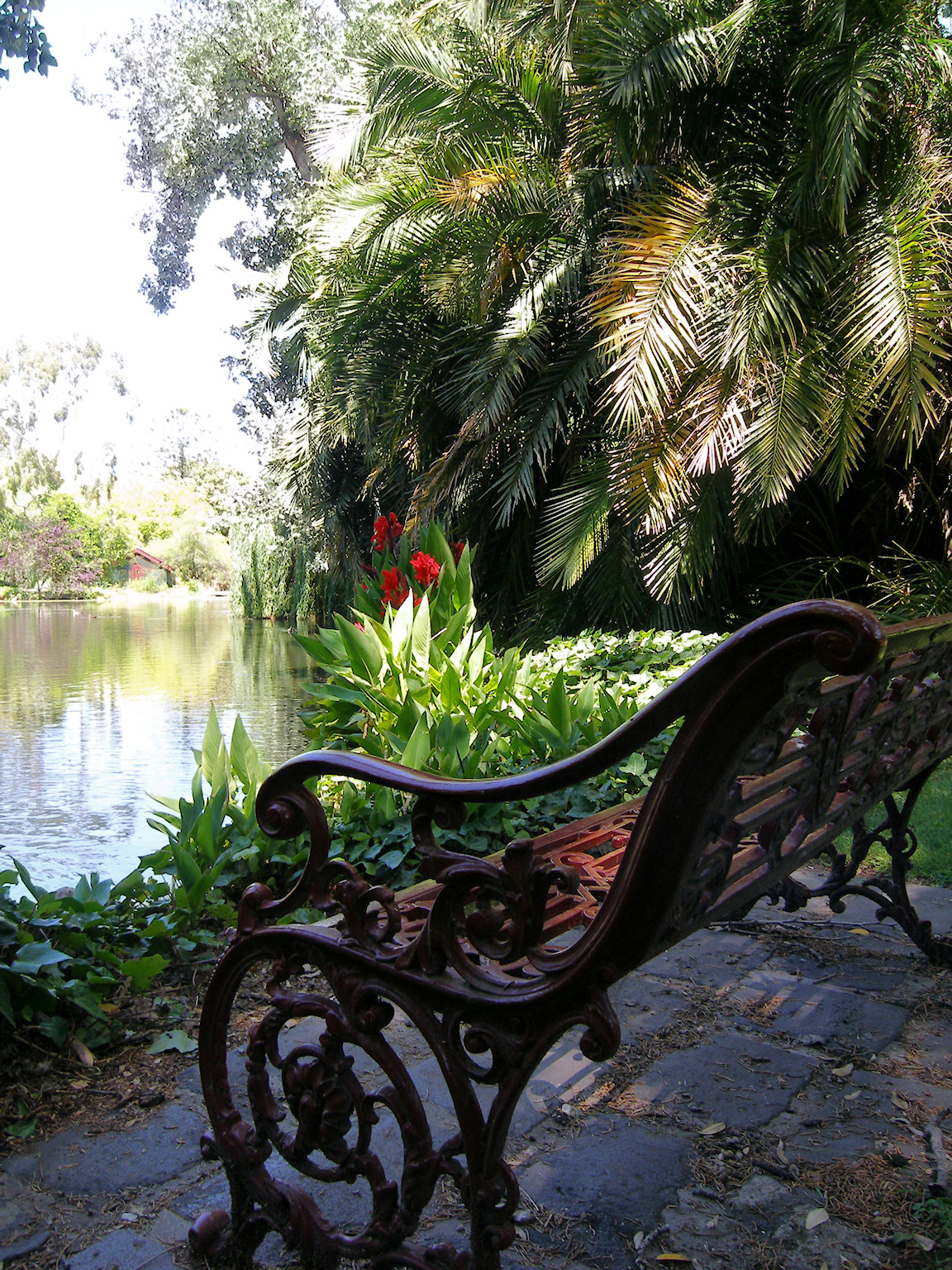
A wrought iron seat by the lake

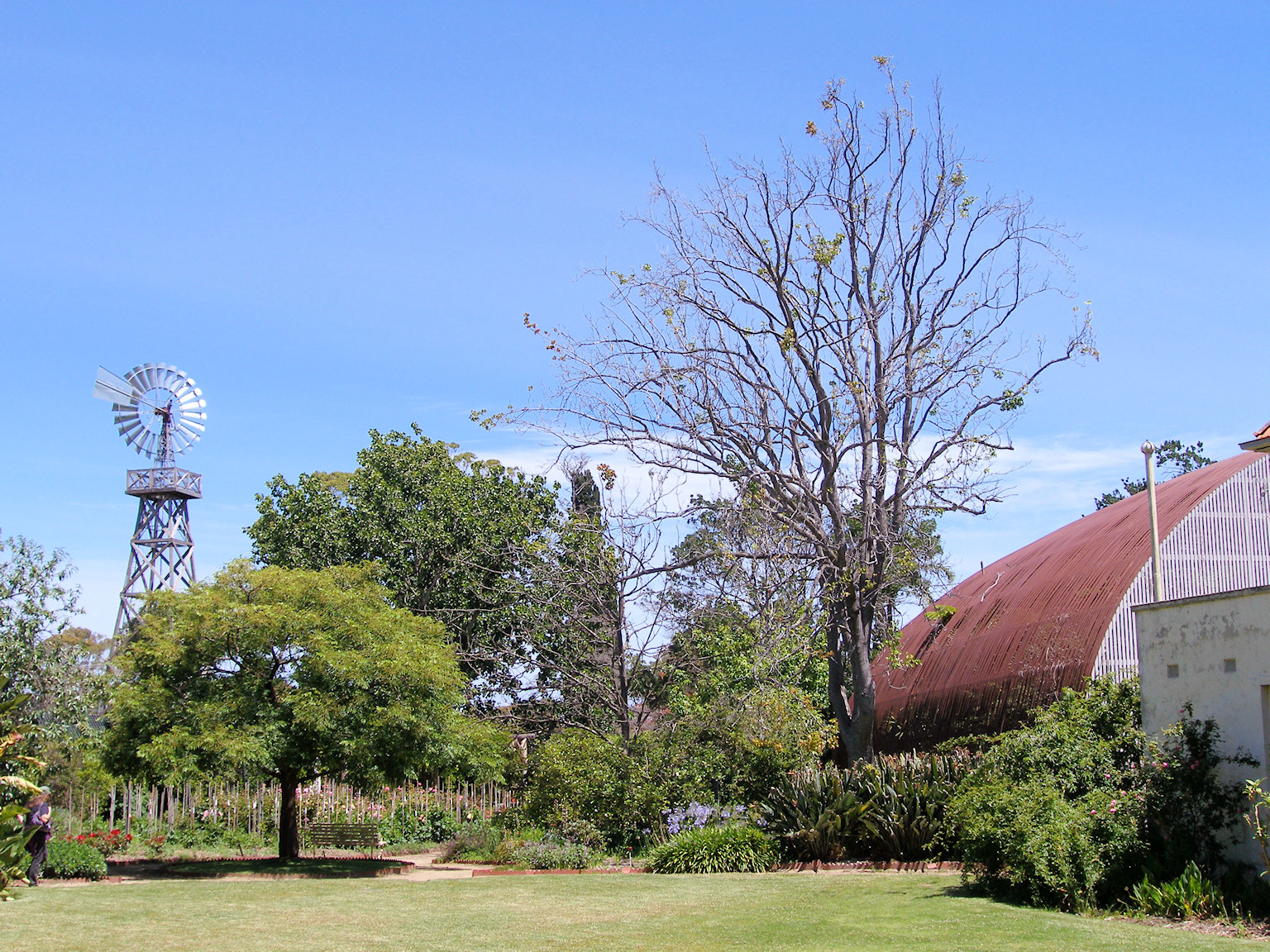
View from the back garden showing the large fernery structure to the right

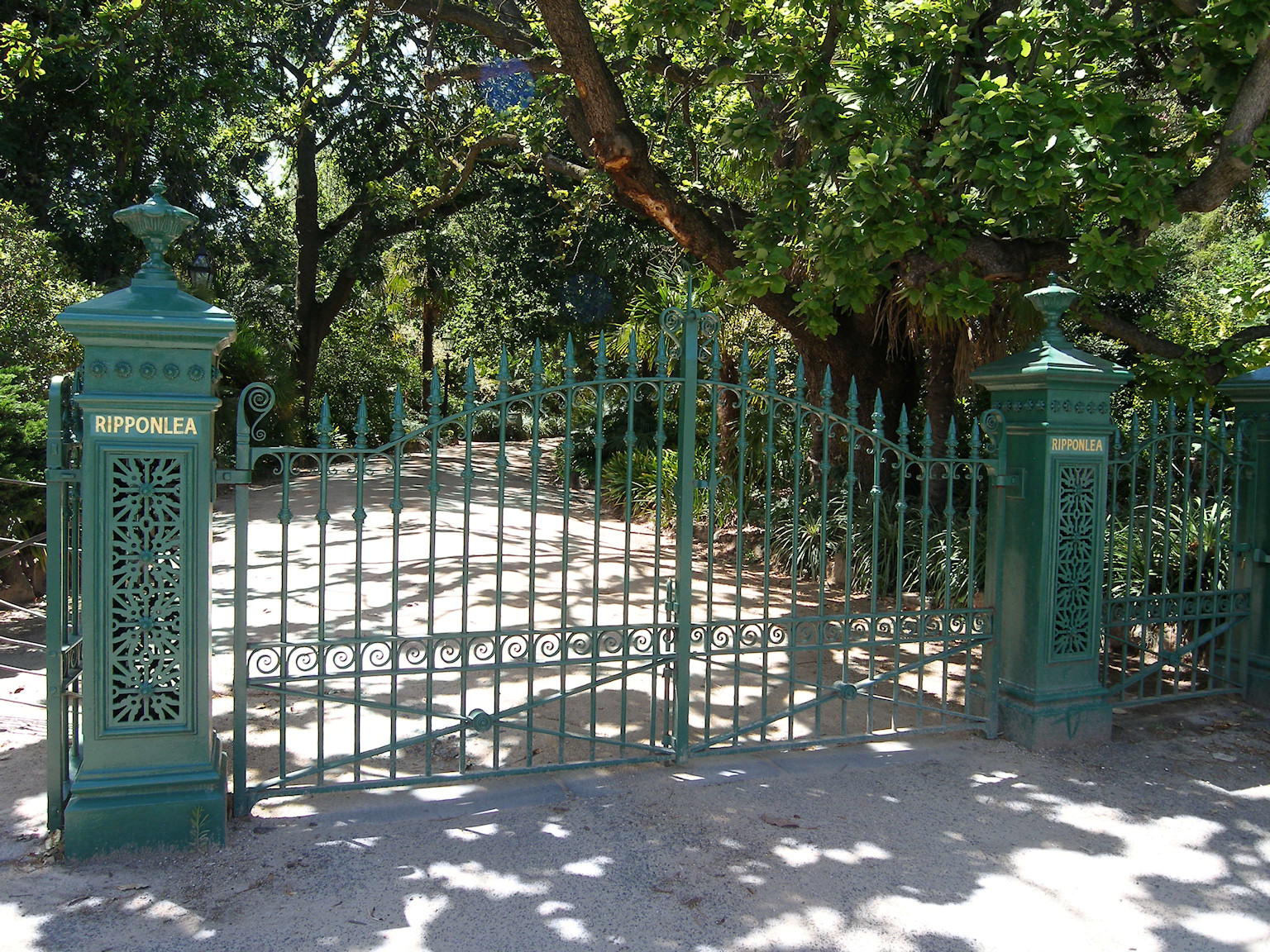
Front gates
