= Carlton Gardens =

Public gardens in Melbourne, Australia

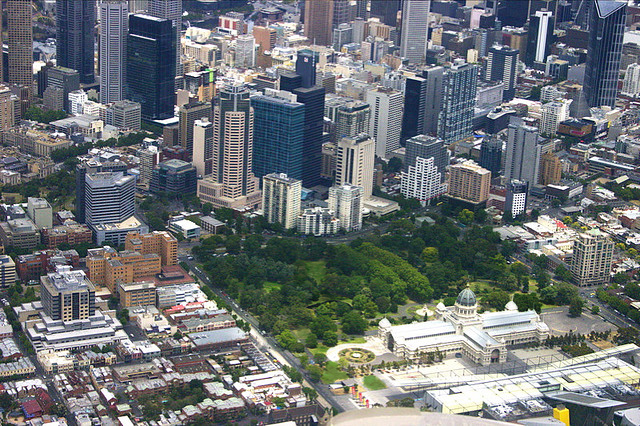
- Aerial view of The Royal Exhibition Building in the Carlton Gardens and the Melbourne central business district
- Interactive map of Carlton Gardens
- Type: Urban park
- Location: Melbourne, Victoria, Australia
- Coordinates: 37°48′22″S 144°58′13″E
- Area: 26 ha (64 acres)
- Opened: 1856; 170 years ago
- Operator: City of Melbourne
- Open: All year
- Status: Open
- Paths: Sealed
- Terrain: Flat
- Vegetation: Australian Native, Lawns, Non-native traditional gardens
- Public transit: Tram routes 86, 96
- Landmarks: Royal Exhibition Building, Melbourne Museum
- Facilities: Toilets, Drinking Fountains, Seating

UNESCO World Heritage Site
- Official name: Royal Exhibition Building and Carlton Gardens
- Type: Cultural
- Criteria: ii
- Designated: 2004 (28th session)
- Reference no.: 1131
- Region: Asia-Pacific

Australian National Heritage List
- Type: Historic
- Designated: 21 October 1980; 45 years ago
- Reference no.: 5274

Victorian Heritage Register
- Type: Community Facilities
- Criteria: a, b, c, d, e, g
- Designated: 21 March 1982; 44 years ago
- Reference no.: H1501
- Heritage Overlay number: HO69

The Carlton Gardens is a UNESCO World Heritage Site located on the northeastern edge of the Central Business District in the suburb of Carlton, Melbourne, in the state of Victoria, Australia. The gardens are a popular picnic and barbecue area, and are home to an array of wildlife, including brushtail possums.

The 26-hectare (64-acre) site contains the Royal Exhibition Building, Melbourne Museum and Imax Cinema, tennis courts and an award-winning playground. The rectangular site is bounded by Victoria Street, Rathdowne Street, Carlton Street, and Nicholson Street. According to the World Heritage listing, the Royal Exhibition Buildings and Carlton Gardens are "of historical, architectural, aesthetic, social and scientific (botanical) significance to the State of Victoria."

The gardens are an example of Victorian landscape design, with sweeping lawns, and a variety of European and Australian plants. Trees within the gardens include deciduous English oaks, White Poplar, plane trees, elms, conifers, cedars, turkey oaks, Araucarias and evergreens such as Moreton Bay figs, and the flower beds consist of annuals and shrubs. A network of tree-lined paths provide formal avenues that highlight the fountains and architecture of the Exhibition Building, including the grand allée of plane trees. Two small ornamental lakes adorn the southern section of the park. The northern section contains the museum, tennis courts, maintenance depot and curator's cottage, and the playground designed as a Victorian maze.

The listing in the Victorian Heritage Register says in part:

The Carlton Gardens are of scientific (botanical) significance for their outstanding collection of plants, including conifers, palms, evergreen and deciduous trees, many of which have grown to an outstanding size and form. The elm avenues of Ulmus procera and Ulmus × hollandica are significant as few examples remain world wide due to Dutch elm disease. The Garden contains a rare specimen of Acmena ingens, only five other specimens are known, an uncommon Harpephyllum afrum and the largest recorded in Victoria, Taxodium distichum, and outstanding specimens of Chamaecyparis funebris and Ficus macrophylla, south west of the Royal Exhibition Building.

Wildlife includes brushtail possums, ducks and ducklings in spring, tawny frogmouths, kookaburras. Indian mynas and silver gulls are common. At night, Gould's wattled bats and white-striped freetail bats hunt for insects, while grey-headed flying foxes visit the gardens when native trees are flowering or fruiting.

The gardens contain three fountains: the Exhibition Fountain, designed for the 1880 Exhibition by sculptor Joseph Hochgurtel; the French Fountain; and the Westgarth Drinking Fountain.

The grounds adjoining the north of the Exhibition Building formerly contained a sports ground, known as the Exhibition Oval or Exhibition Track. A fifth-of-a-mile oval asphalt cycling track was built in 1890, then was refurbished in 1896 to improve the surface and widen and bank the corners. The circuit held cycling races until the 1920s, as well as low-powered motorcycle races. The cycling track was removed in 1928, and replaced with a dirt track for high-powered motorcycle racing, which was growing in popularity at the time. A new seventh-of-a-mile banked oval board track was constructed in its place in 1936, but was removed in 1939 after the Supreme Court ruled that the track contravened the Exhibition Act, which required that the public have free access to the grounds; the track itself was moved to Napier Park, Essendon. Throughout its existence, the grassed oval in the middle of the racing tracks was used for various field sports events and carnivals, and at one point during a 1931 dispute between the Victorian Football League and its Grounds Management Association, the oval was on stand-by to serve as a VFL venue during the 1931 season. The gardens, including the Exhibition Building and the fountains, are now a popular spot for wedding photography. The Exhibition Building is still used for exhibitions, including the Melbourne International Flower and Garden Show. However, the Melbourne Convention & Exhibition Centre which opened in 1996 in Southbank, has become Melbourne's primary location for exhibitions and conventions.

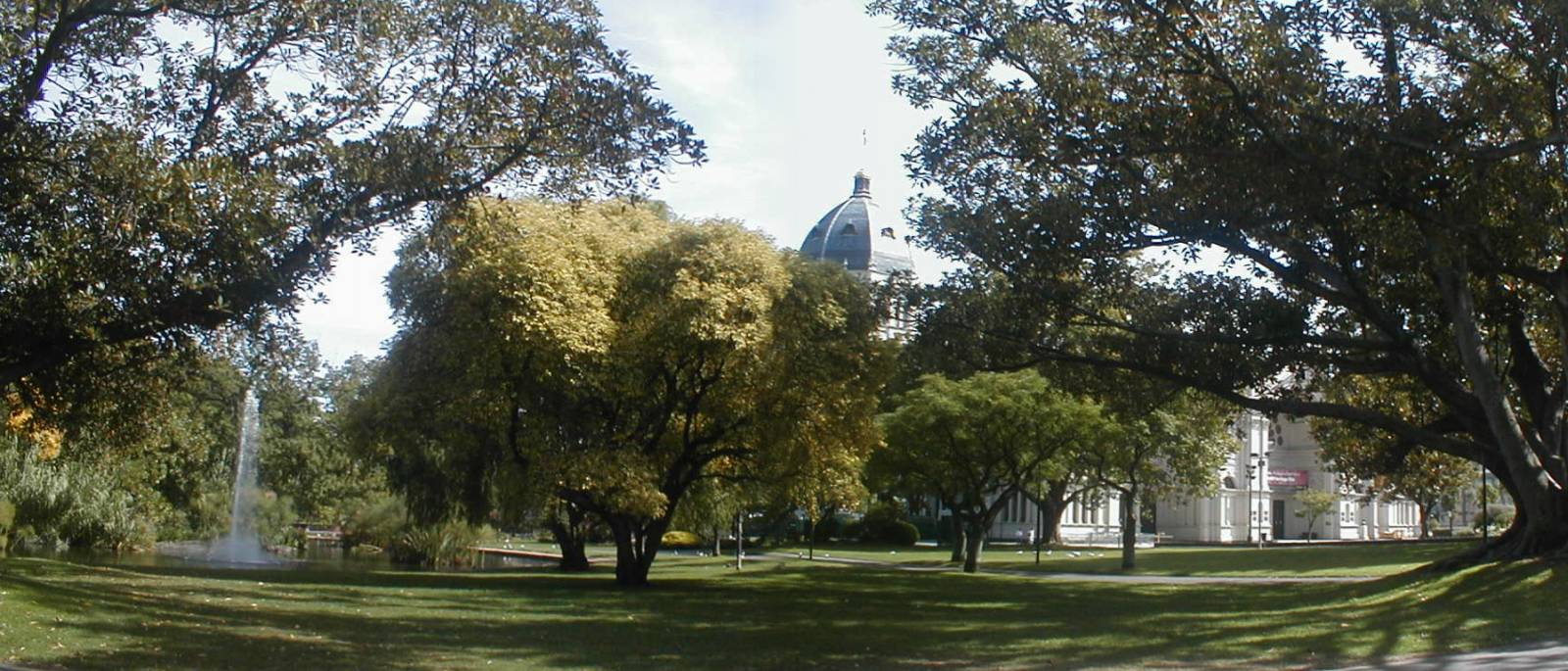
Carlton Gardens south

== History ==
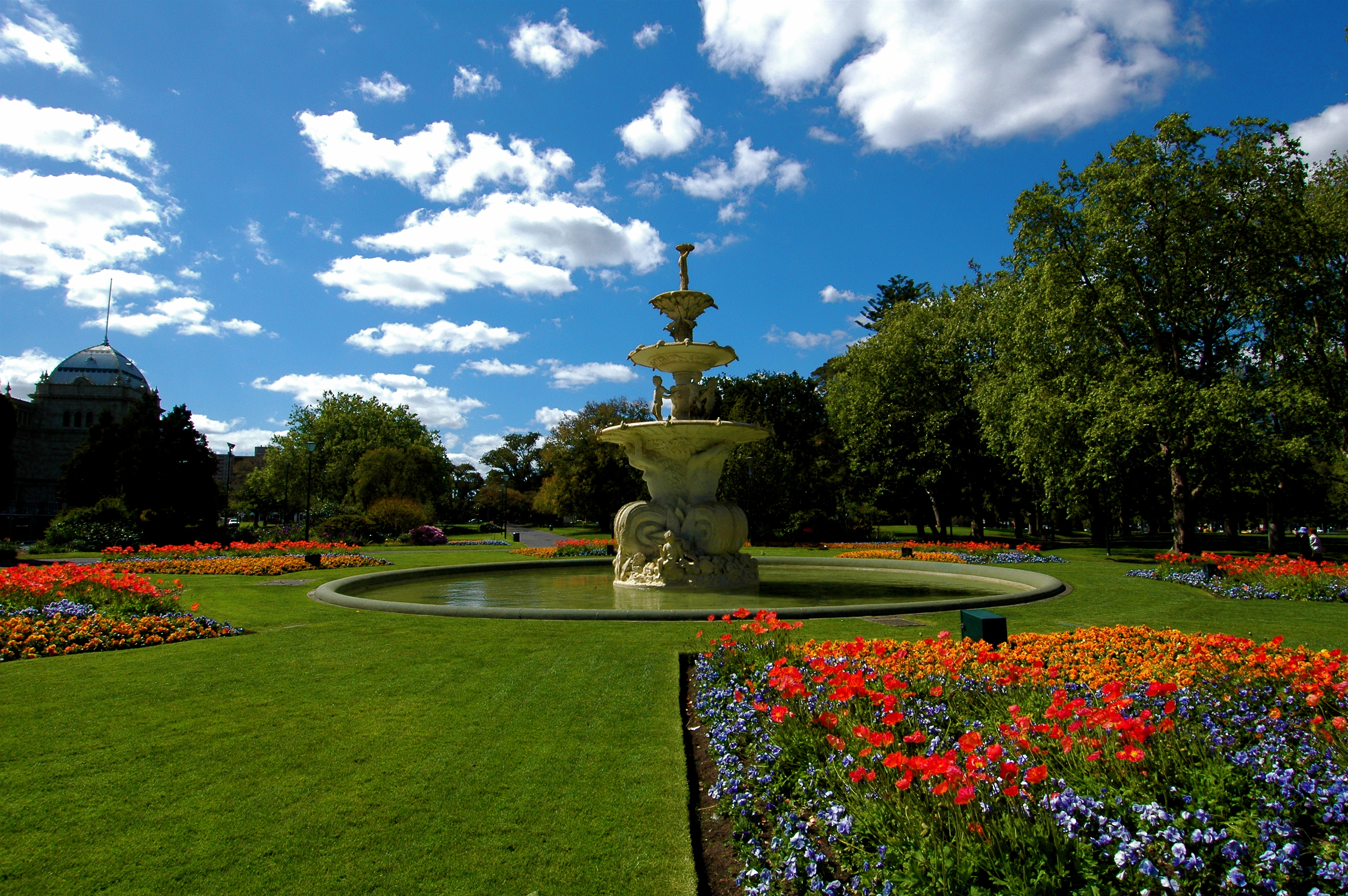
Carlton Gardens fountain

- 1839 – Large tracts of land surrounding the original town grid of Melbourne were reserved from sale by Superintendent Charles La Trobe. Most of this land was later sold and subdivided or used for the development of various public institutions, but a number of substantial sites were permanently reserved as public parks, including Carlton Gardens as well as Flagstaff Gardens, Fitzroy Gardens, Treasury Gardens and Kings Domain.
- Circa 1856 – The City of Melbourne obtained control of the Carlton Gardens, and engaged Edward La Trobe Bateman (cousin of Charles La Trobe) to prepare a design for the site. The path layout and other features of the design were built, although limitations on funding for maintenance etc. resulted in frequent criticism.
- 1870s – The colonial Victorian Government resumed control of the Gardens and minor changes were made under the direction of Clement Hodgkinson. The site was soon afterwards drastically redesigned for the 1880 Melbourne International Exhibition by the architect Joseph Reed. The prominent local horticulturist and landscape designer William Sangster was engaged as a contractor to redevelop the gardens in February 1879.
- 1880 – Exhibition Building completed for the Melbourne International Exhibition that year. Temporary annexes to house some of the exhibition in the northern section were demolished after the exhibition closed on 30 April 1881.
- 1888 – Melbourne Centennial Exhibition to celebrate a century of European settlement in Australia.
- 1891 – The curator's Lodge was completed and lived in by John Guilfoyle.
- 1901 – First Parliament of Australia opens in the Exhibition Building on May 9. The west annex of the Building becomes the site of the Victorian Parliament for the next 26 years.
- 1919 – buildings became an emergency hospital for influenza epidemic victims
- 1928 – Perimeter fence removed, leaving the bluestone footings.
- 1928 – Exhibition Speedway, a motorcycle speedway track is constructed and opened on 5 November 1928, it hosts the final of the Australian Solo Championship in 1930, 1932 and 1933. It was also considered the birthplace of sidecar speedway.
- 1936 – Exhibition Speedway closes on 7 March 1936.
- Second World War: the buildings were used by the Royal Australian Air Force.
- 1948 to 1961 – part of the complex was used as a migrant reception centre.
- 1999 – Melbourne Museum opens, taking up one sixth of the site.
- 2001 – Taylor Cullity Lethlean with Mary Jeavons wins a landscape award for design and building a new playground of elegant yet robust resolution. The Jury described the design as a distinctive and unified design that respects its historic setting and addresses the demands of creative play for spatial and visual variety.
- July 2004 – After several years of lobbying by the Melbourne City Council, The Royal Exhibition Building and Carlton Gardens, Melbourne, were inscribed on the World Heritage List at the 28th session of the World Heritage Committee held in Suzhou, China.

== Gallery ==
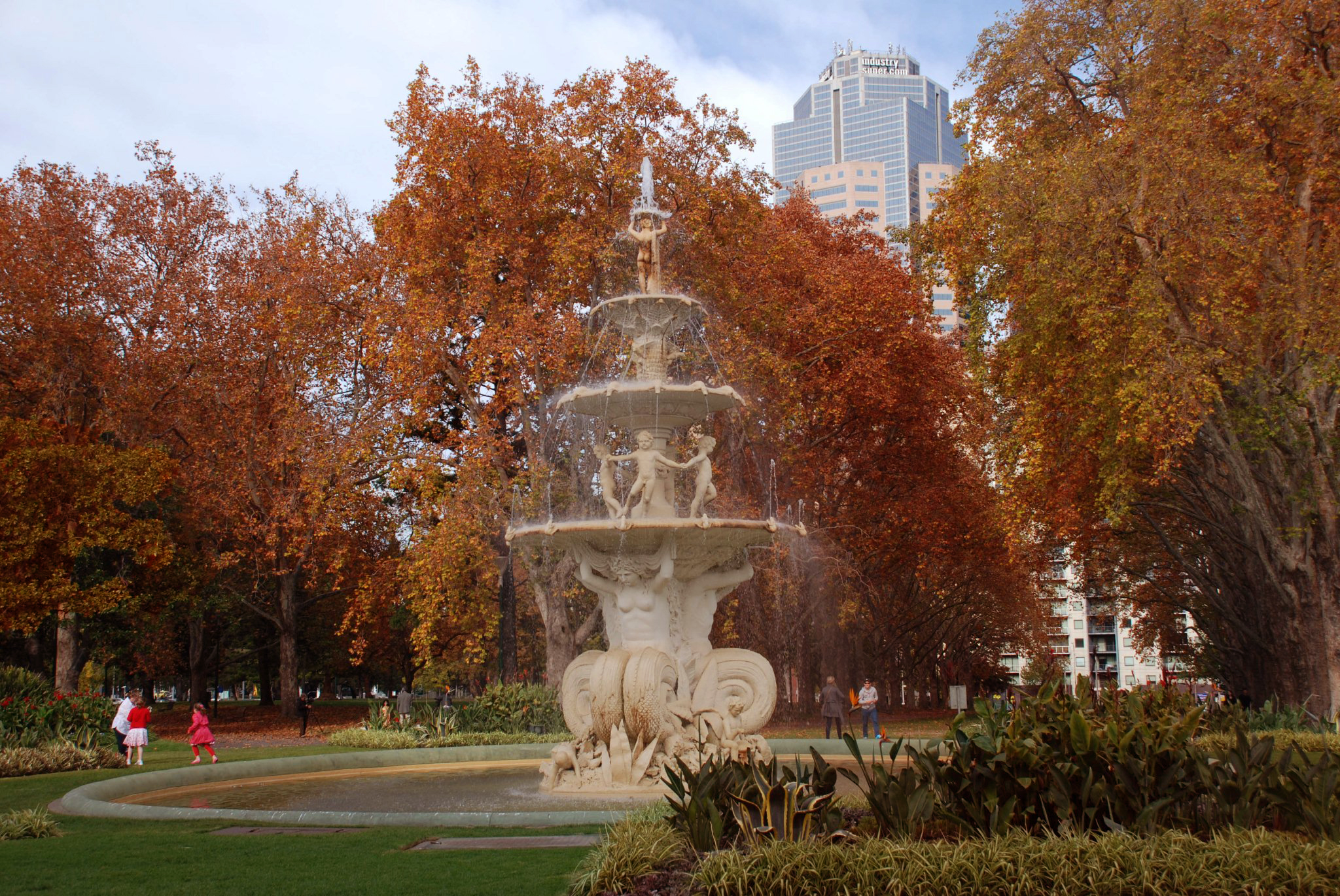
Carlton Gardens in autumn

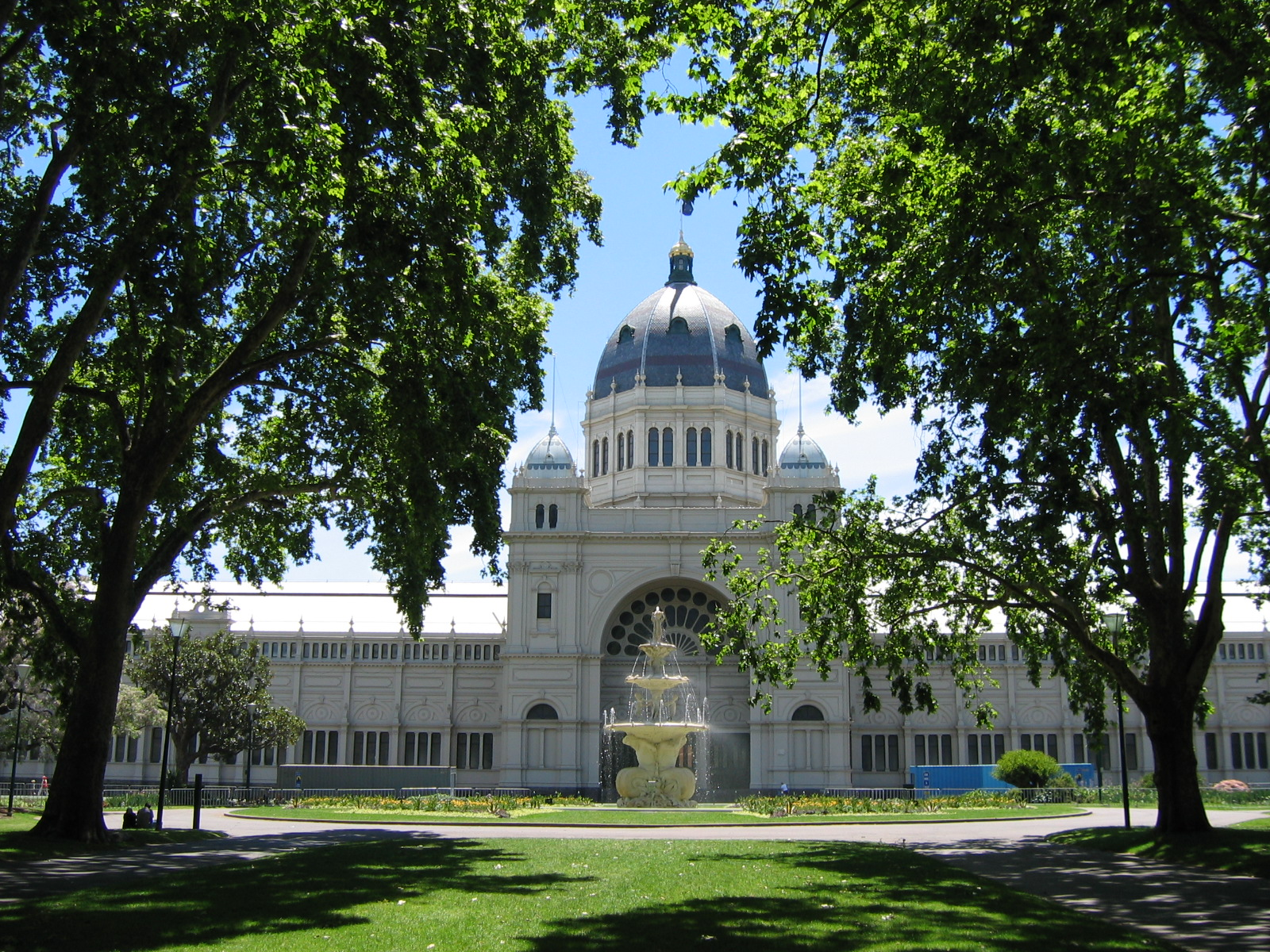
CBN Exhibition Building

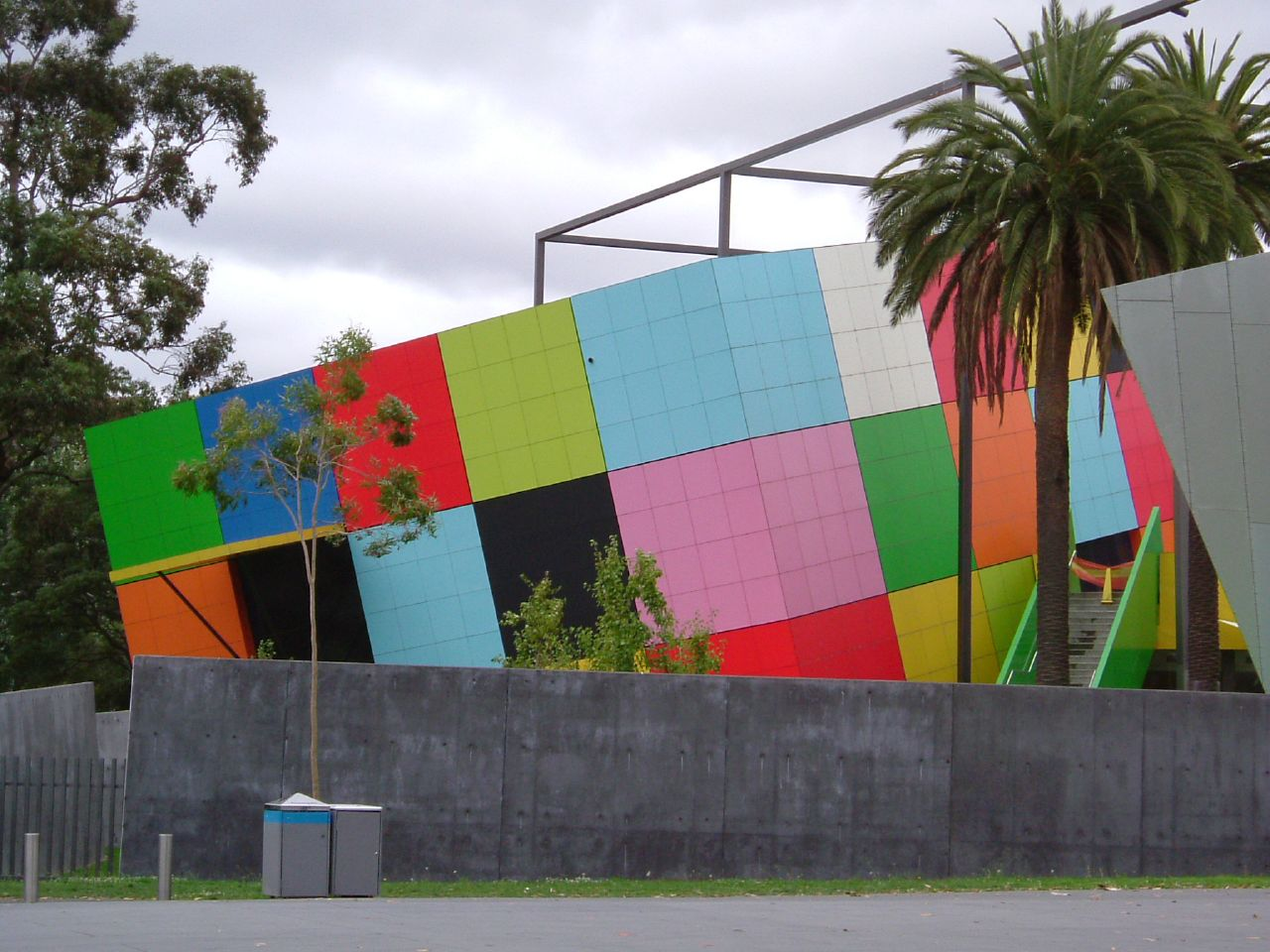
Melbourne Museum

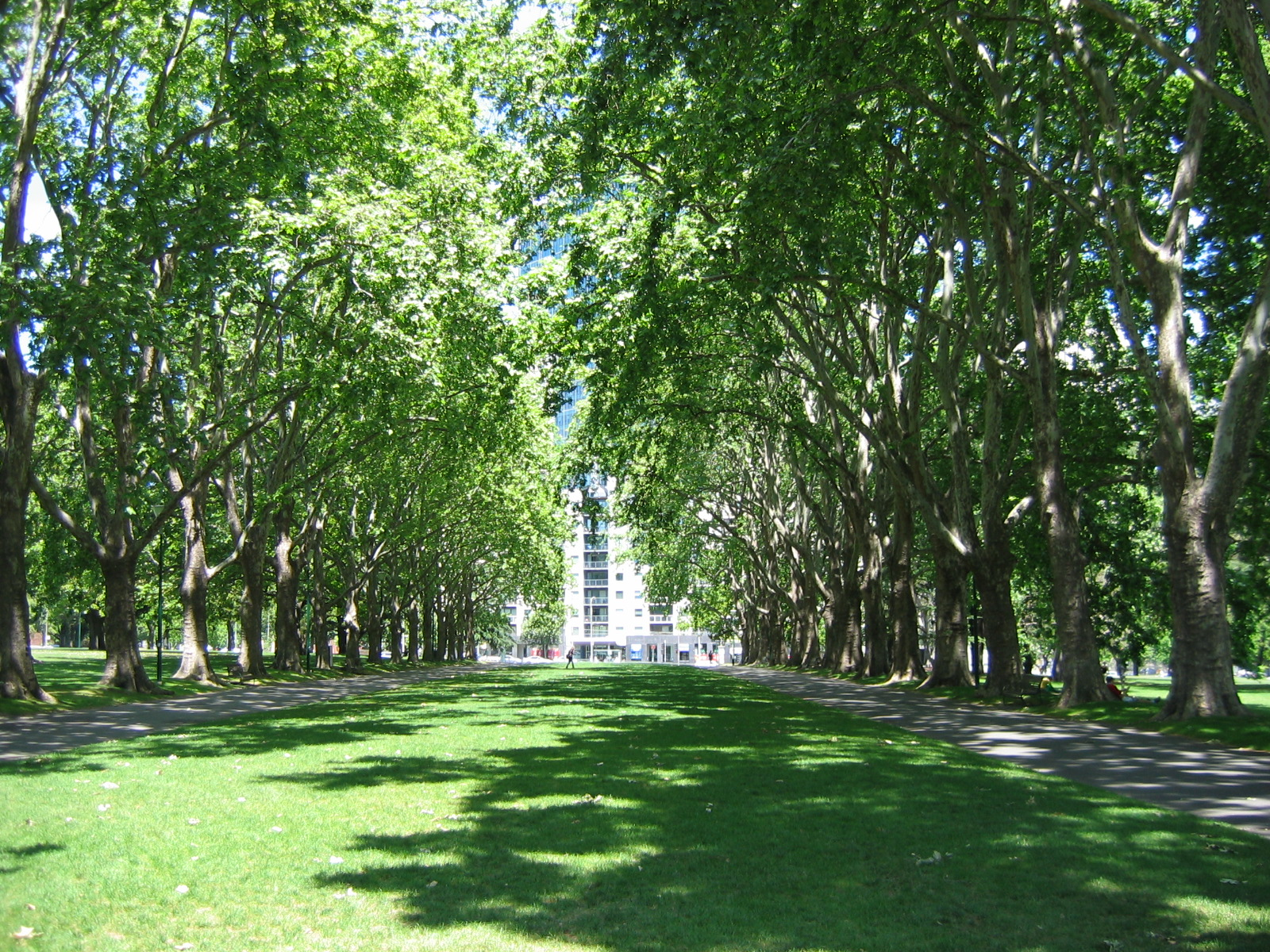
CBN Carlton Gardens

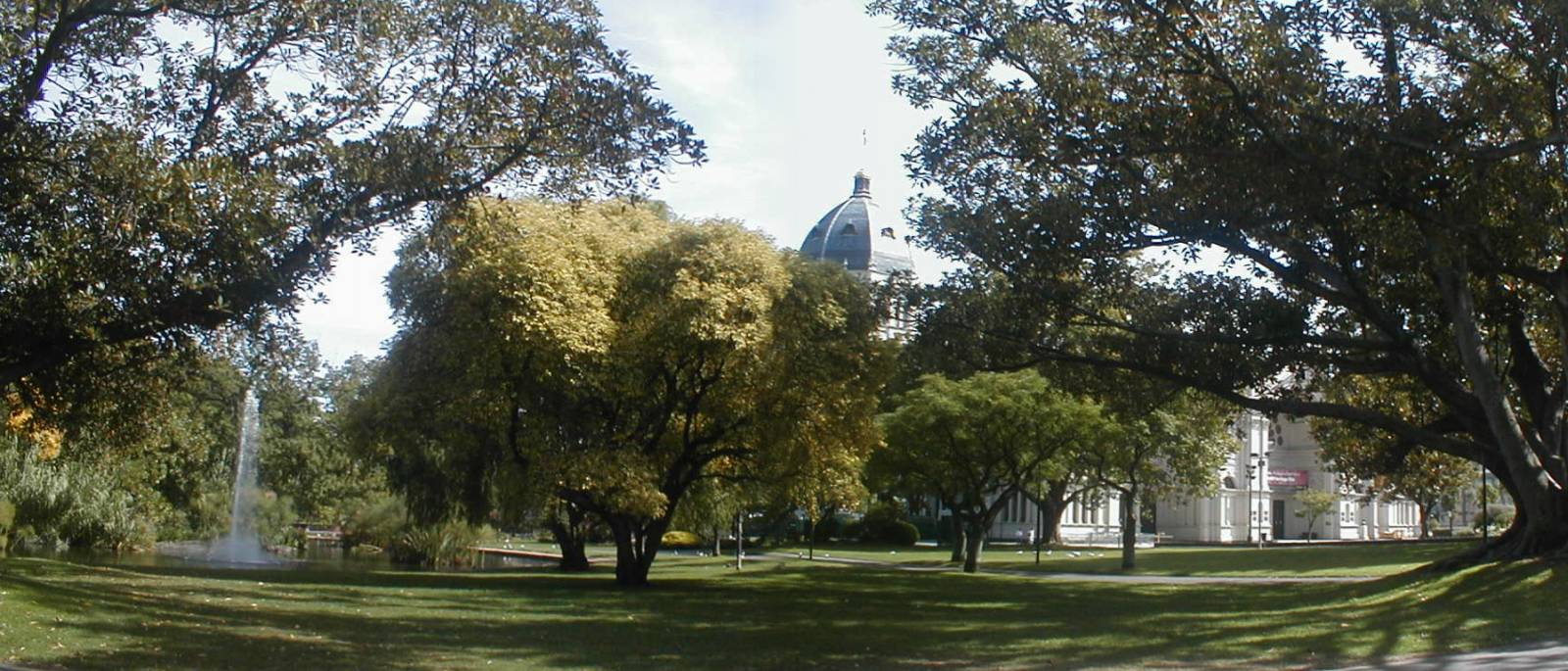
Panorama

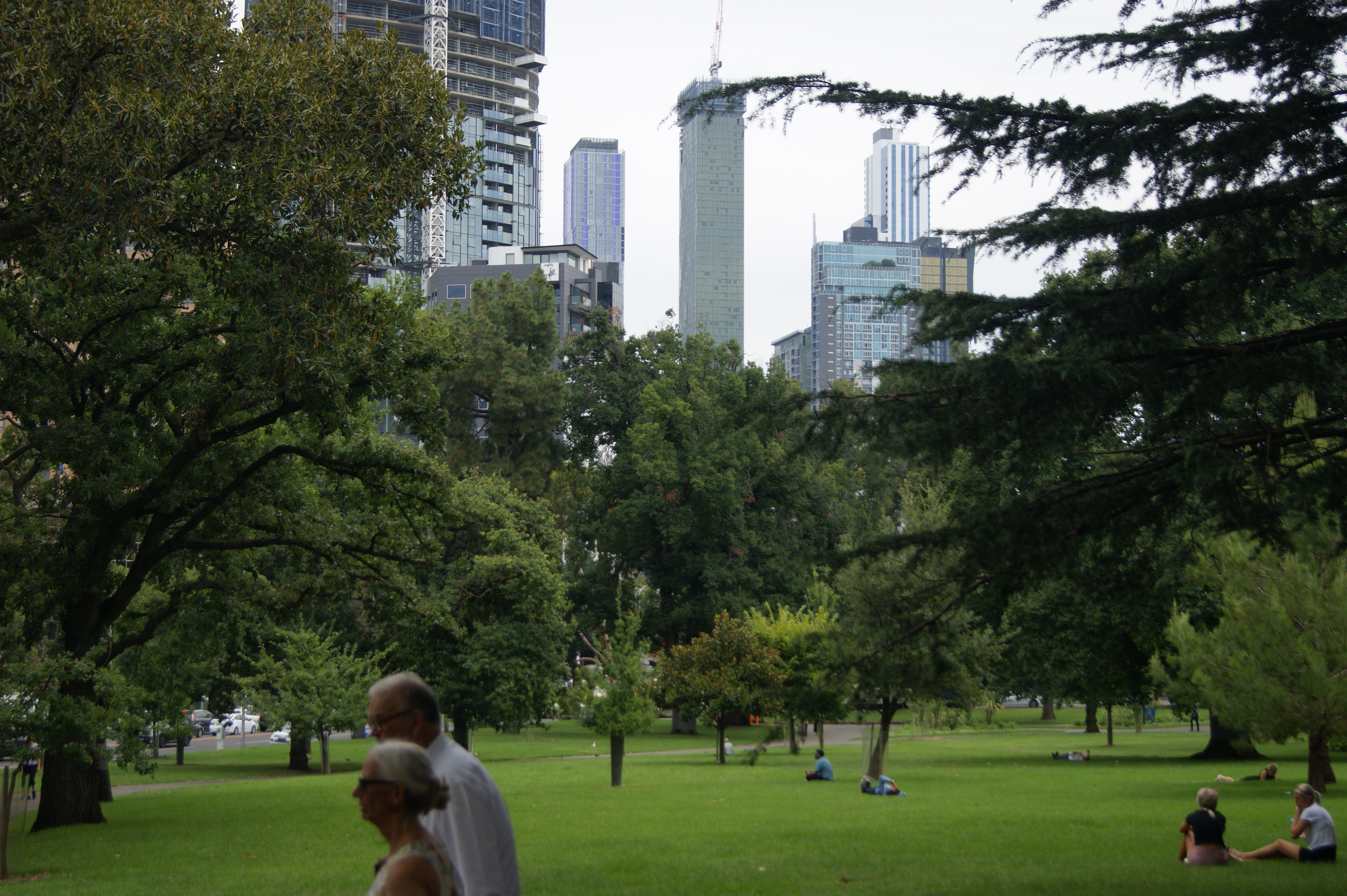
Skyscrapers in the city centre seen from the park (February 2018)

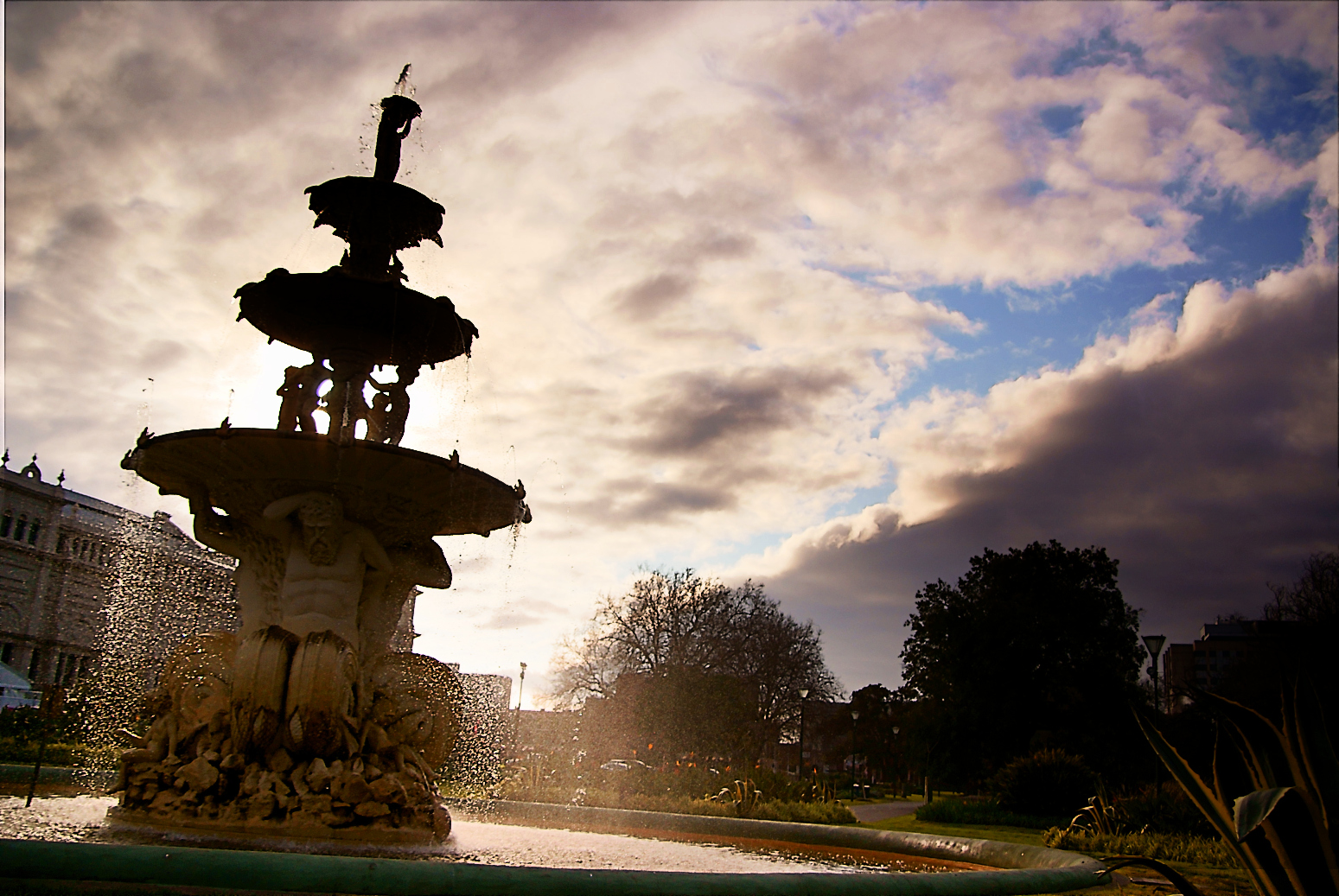
Fountains
