= Wombat Hill Botanic Gardens =

Botanic gardens at Daylesford, Victoria

Coordinates: 37°20′35″S 144°09′02″E

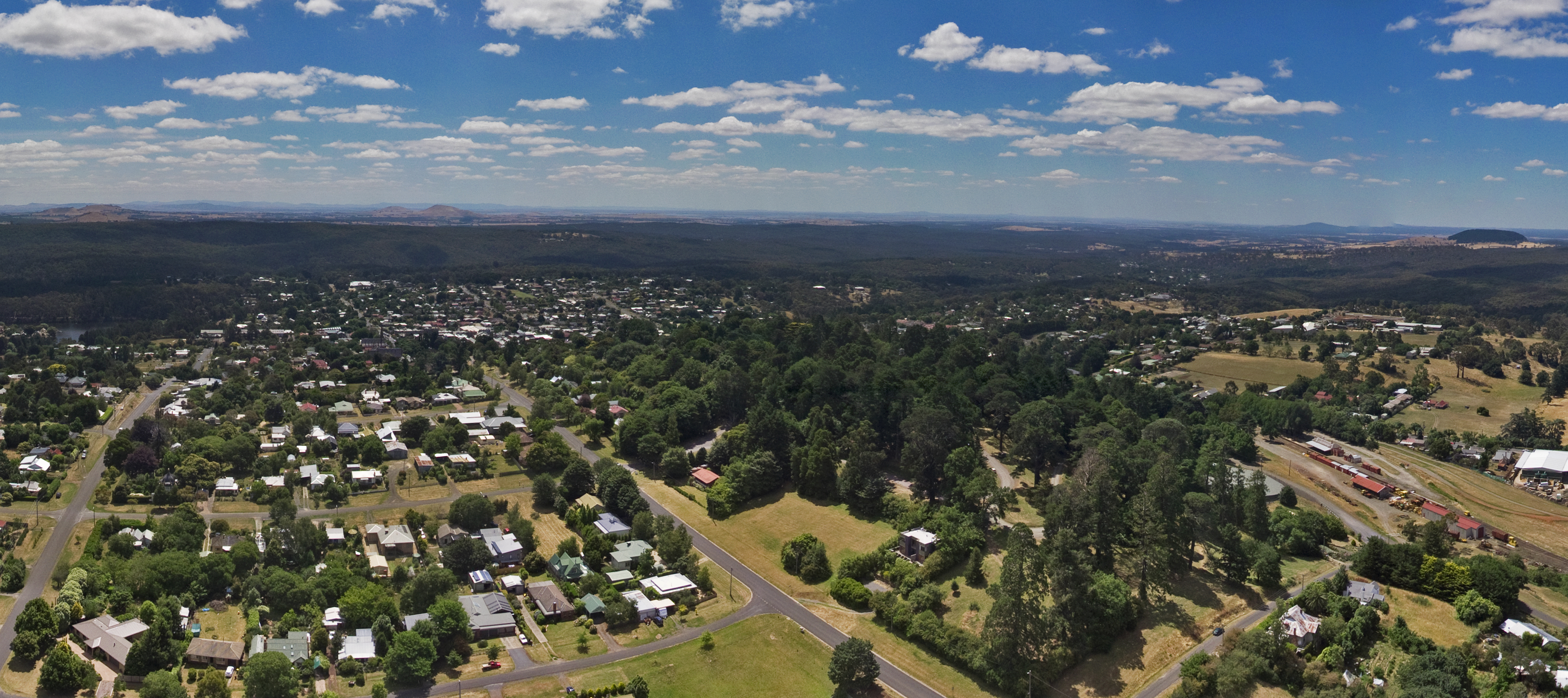
- Aerial panorama of Wombat Hill and surrounds, 2018
- Interactive map of Wombat Hill Botanic Gardens
- Type: Botanical garden
- Location: Daylesford, Victoria, Australia
- Area: 38 hectares (94 acres)
- Opened: 1854
- Operator: Wombat Hill Botanic Gardens
- Vegetation: Australian native, lawns, non-native traditional gardens
- Public transit: Car, walk
- Facilities: Information centre, gift shop, toilets, barbecues, shelter, cafe

The Wombat Hill Botanic Gardens in Daylesford, Victoria, Australia, are included on the Victorian Heritage Register.

Wombat Hill Botanic Gardens is an example of the 19th-century gardens that survive across provincial Victoria and is a picturesque setting for a walk or picnic. It is the home of a moist fern gully and the conifers and exotic trees show how European trees acclimatized to cold conditions at this altitude.

== Governance ==
The Wombat Hill (Daylesford) Botanic Gardens are crown land owned by the State of Victoria - Department of Sustainability and Environment. Hepburn Shire Council is the Committee of Management for the Garden. Hepburn Shire has a Wombat Hill Botanic Gardens Advisory Committee who held the 150 year anniversary of the gardens in 2013. There is a Friends of the Wombat Hill Botanic Gardens.

The Wombat Hill Botanic Gardens are also known as the Daylesford Botanic Gardens. They are included on the Victorian Heritage Register as they are of historic, scientific (botanic), and aesthetic significance to the State of Victoria.

== Gallery ==
Photographs of the gardens are found on Flickr. A set of images can be searched in Trove at the National Library of Australia.

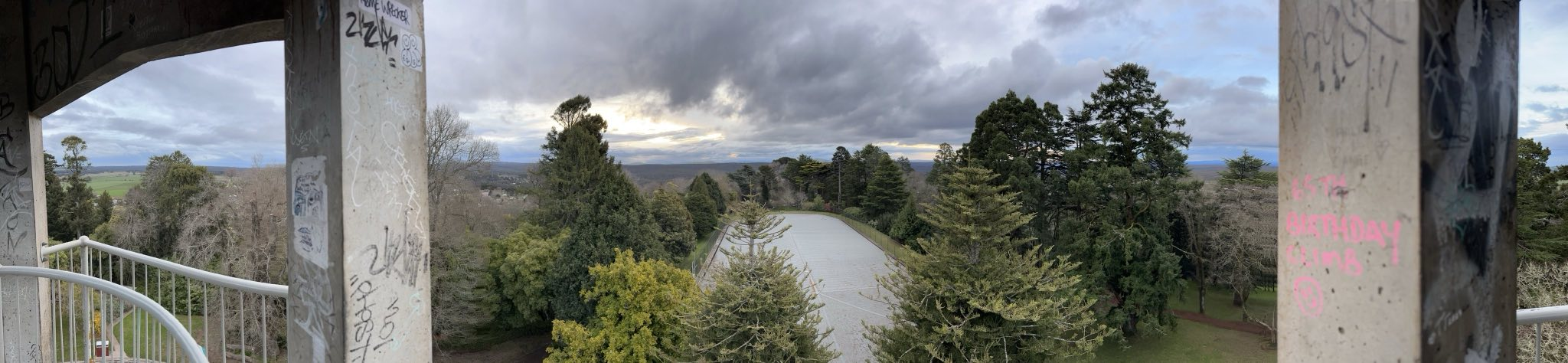
View from the lookout tower at Wombat Hill Botanic Gardens, Daylesford, Victoria

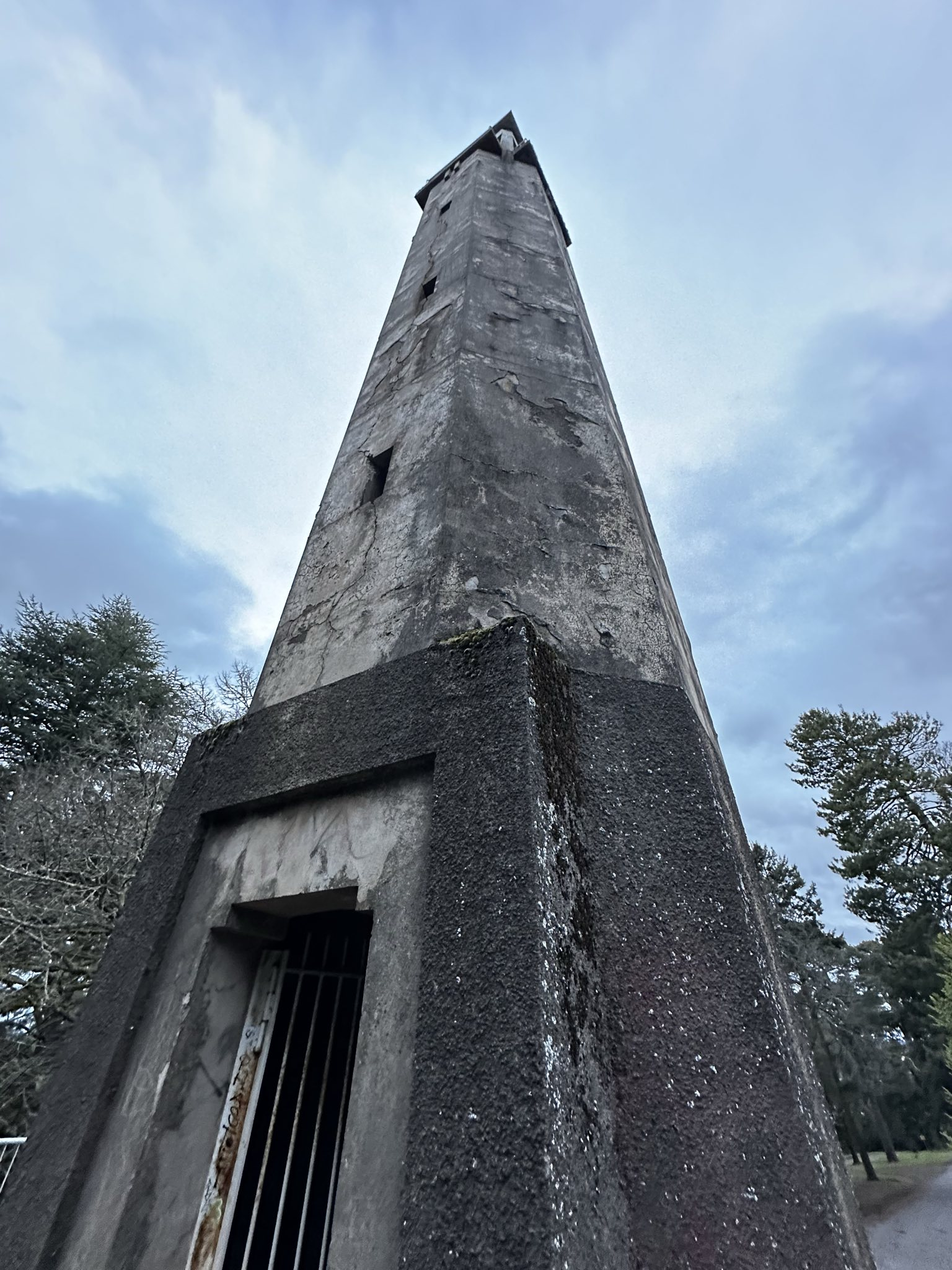
The lookout tower at Wombat Hill Botanic Gardens, Daylesford, Victoria
